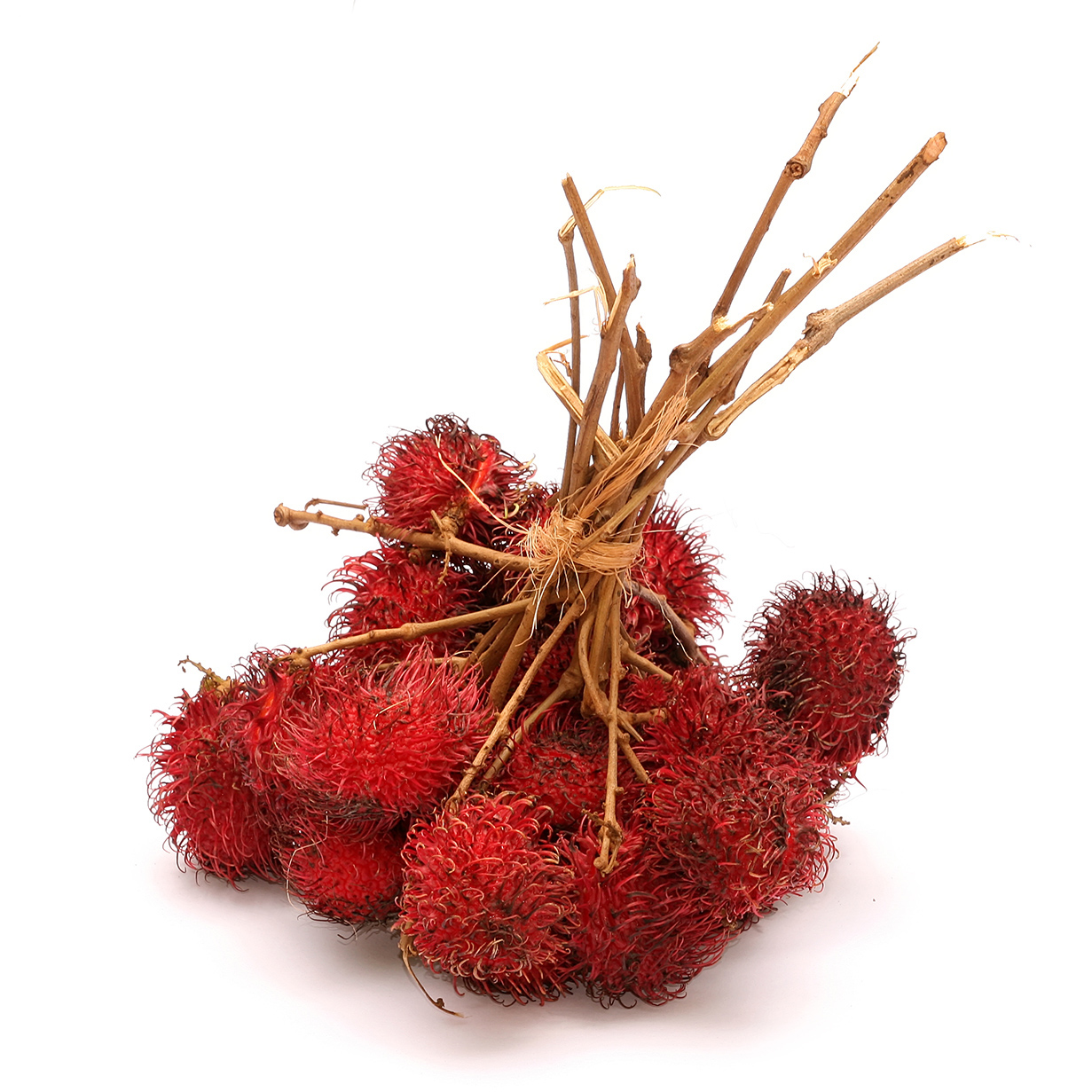
- Nephelium lappaceum fruits

Scientific classification
- Kingdom: Plantae
- Clade: Tracheophytes
- Clade: Angiosperms
- Clade: Eudicots
- Clade: Rosids
- Order: Sapindales
- Family: Sapindaceae
- Subfamily: Sapindoideae; Burnett

Tribes
- Athyaneae Acev.‐Rodr. (2017); Bridgesieae Acev.‐Rodr. (2017); Blomieae Buerki & Callm. (2021); Cupanieae Blume (1857); Guindilieae Buerki, Callm. & Acev.‐Rodr. (2021); Haplocoeleae Buerki & Callm. (2021); Koelreuterieae Radlk. (1890); Melicocceae Blume (1847); Nephelieae Radlk. (1890); Paullinieae (Kunth) DC. (1824); Sapindeae (Kunth) DC. (1824); Schleichereae Radlk. (1890); Stadmanieae Buerki & Callm. (2021); Thouiniaeae Blume (1847); Tristiropsideae Buerki & Callm. (2021); Ungnadieae Buerki & Callm. (2021)

= Sapindoideae =

Subfamily of flowering plants

Sapindoideae is a subfamily of flowering plants in the soapberry family, Sapindaceae. It includes a number of fruit trees, including lychees, longans, rambutans, and quenepas.

== Tribes and genera ==
This follows the updated classification of Buerki et al.

=== Tribe Athyaneae ===
Acev.‐Rodr. (2017). Type: Athyana (Griseb.) Radlk.

- Athyana Radlk. (1 species; Peru, Bolivia, Argentina)
- Diatenopteryx Radlk. (2; Southern South America)

=== Tribe Blomieae ===
Buerki & Callm. (2021). Type: Blomia Miranda

- Blomia Miranda (1 species; Mexico, Guatemala and Belize)

=== Tribe Bridgesieae ===
Acev.‐Rodr. (2017). Type: Bridgesia Bertero ex Cambess.

- Bridgesia Bertero ex Cambess. (1 species; Chile)

=== Tribe Cupanieae ===
Blume (1857). Type: Cupania L.

- Alectryon Gaertn. (25 species; Malesia, Australasia and Micronesia)
- Arytera Blume (c. 28; India, Southeast Asia to Australasia)
- Castanospora F.Muell. (1; Australia)
- Cnesmocarpon Adema(1; Australia, Papua New Guinea)
- Cupania L. (c. 50; Neotropical)
- Cupaniopsis Radlk. (60; Malesia to Australasia)
- Dictyoneura Blume (2–3; Malesia, Philippines, Australia)
- Diploglottis Hook.f. (12; Australia, Papua New Guinea)
- Elattostachys (Blume) Radlk. (c. 20; Malesia, Australasia)
- Eurycorymbus Hand.-Mazz. (1 species; China)
- Gloeocarpus Radlk. (1; Philippines)
- Gongrodiscus Radlk. (3; New Caledonia)
- Gongrospermum Radlk. (3; Philippines)
- Guioa Cav. (c. 64; Southeastern Asia to Australasia)
- Jagera Blume (2; Moluccas, New Guinea, Australia)
- Lecaniodiscus Planch. ex Benth. (2; Tropical Africa)
- Lepiderema Radlk. (8; Australia, New Guinea)
- Lepidocupania Buerki, Callm., Munzinger & Lowry (21; western tropical Pacific)
- Lepidopetalum Blume (6; Malesia, Australia)
- Matayba Aubl. (c. 50; Neotropical)
- Mischarytera (Radlk.) H.Turner (3; Australia, Papua New Guinea)
- Mischocarpus (Blume (c. 15; Southeastern Asia to Australia)
- Molinaea Comm. ex Juss. (c. 10; Madagascar and Mascarenes Islands)
- Neoarytera Callm., Buerki, Munzinger & Lowry (4; New Caledonia and Vanuatu)
- Pentascyphus Radlk. (1; French Guiana, Surinam, Brazil)
- Podonephelium Baill. (4; New Caledonia)
- Rhysotoechia Radlk. (c. 14; Australia, Malesia)
- Sarcopteryx Radlk. (12–13; Australia, Moluccas, New Guinea)
- Sarcotoechia Radlk. (c. 11; Australia, Moluccas, New Guinea)
- Scyphonychium Radlk. (1; Brazil, French Guiana)
- Storthocalyx Radlk. (4; New Caledonia)
- Synima Radlk. (2; Australia, New Guinea)
- Tina Schult. (19; Madagascar)
- Toechima Radlk. (c. 8; Australia, New Guinea)
- Trigonachras Radlk. (8; Non-Javanese Malesia & Lesser Sunda)
- Vouarana Aubl. (2; Costa Rica to Brazil)

=== Tribe Guindilieae ===
Buerki, Callm. & Acev.‐Rodr. (2021). Type: Guindilia Gillies ex Hook. & Arn.

- Guindilia Gillies ex Hook. & Arn. (3 species; Southern South America)

=== Tribe Haplocoeleae ===
Buerki & Callm. (2021). Type: Haplocoelum Radlk.

- Blighiopsis Van der Veken (1 species; Central Africa)
- Haplocoelum Radlk. (c. 7; Tropical Africa and Madagascar)

=== Tribe Koelreuterieae ===
Radlk. (1890). Type: Koelreuteria Laxm.

- Erythrophysa E.Mey. ex Arn. (5 species; South Africa, Madagascar — synonym Erythrophysopsis Verdc.)
- Koelreuteria Laxm. (c. 4; Eastern Asia)
- Stocksia Benth. (1; Near East, Afghanistan)

=== Tribe Melicocceae ===
Blume (1847). Type: Melicoccus P.Browne

- Dilodendron Radlk. (3 species; Neotropical)
- Melicoccus P.Browne (10; Dominican Republic, South America)
- Talisia Aubl. (52; Southern Mexico to South America)
- Tripterodendron Radlk. (1; Brazil)

=== Tribe Nephelieae ===
Radlk. (1890). Type: Nephelium L.

- Aporrhiza Radlk. (4–6 species; Tropical Africa)
- Blighia K.D.Koenig (3; Tropical Africa)
- Chytranthus Hook.f. (25+; Western tropical Africa)
- Cubilia Blume (1; Malesia)
- Dimocarpus Lour. (6; Southern Asia to Australia)
- Glenniea Hook.f. (8; Paleotropical)
- Haplocoelopsis F.G.Davies (1; Central and East Africa)
- Laccodiscus Radlk. (c. 6; West Africa)
- Litchi Sonn. (1; Southeastern China to Malesia)
- Nephelium L. (c. 16; Southeastern Asia to Malesia)
- Otonephelium Radlk. (1; Southern India)
- Pancovia Willd. (10–12; West Africa)
- Placodiscus Radlk. (c. 10; Tropical Africa)
- Pometia J.R.Forst. & G.Forst. (2; India and Pacific Islands)
- Radlkofera Gilg (1; Western Africa)
- Xerospermum Blume (2; Bangladesh, Indochina to Eastern Malesia)

=== Tribe Paullinieae ===
(Kunth) DC. (1824). Type: Paullinia L.

- Cardiospermum L. (15 species; Pantropical)
- Lophostigma Radlk. (2; Ecuador, Peru, Bolivia)
- Paullinia L. (c. 190; Neotropics & Africa)
- Serjania Mill. (c. 230; Neotropics — synonyms: Balsas J.Jiménez Ram. & K.Vega and Houssayanthus Hunz.)
- Thinouia Triana & Planch. (c. 12; Central and South America)
- Urvillea Kunth (c. 15; Central and South America)

=== Tribe Sapindeae ===
(Kunth) DC. (1824). Type: Sapindus L.

- Alatococcus Acev.-Rodr. (1 species; Brazil)
- Atalaya Blume (12; South Africa, Australia, Malesia)
- Deinbollia Schumach. (c. 38; Southern Africa, Madagascar, Mascarene)
- Eriocoelum Hook.f. (10+; Tropical Africa)
- Hornea Baker (1; Mauritius)
- Lepisanthes Blume (c. 24; Paleotropics, Australia)
- Porocystis Radlk. (2; Brazil, French Guiana)
- Pseudima Radlk. (1; Continental neotropics)
- Sapindus L. (c. 10; Circumtropical)
- Thouinidium radlk. (6;| Central America & Greater Antilles)
- Toulicia Aubl. (12; South America)
- Tristira Radlk. (1;| Philippines, Moluccas, Celebes)
- Zollingeria Kurz (3–4; Indochina, Borneo)

=== Tribe Schleichereae ===
Radlk. (1890). Type: Schleichera Willd.

- Amesiodendron Hu (1–3 species; Southern China to Sumatra)
- Paranephelium Miq. (4; Yunnan to Malesia)
- Pavieasia Pierre (1–3; China)
- Phyllotrichum Thorel ex Lecomte (1; Laos)
- Schleichera Willd. (1; Sri Lanka and India to Malesia)
- Sisyrolepis Radlk. (1; Thailand & Cambodia)

=== Tribe Stadmanieae ===
Buerki & Callm. (2021). Type: Stadmannia Lam. ex. Poir.

- Beguea Capuron (1 species; Madagascar)
- Camptolepis Radlk. (4; East Africa, Madagascar)
- Chouxia Capuron (6; Madagascar)
- Gereaua (Capuron) Buerki & Callm. (1; Madagascar)
- Macphersonia Blume (8; Aldabra, Madagascar, West Tropical Africa)
- Pappea Eckl. & Zeyh. (1; Southern Africa)
- Plagioscyphus Radlk. (c. 10; Madagascar)
- Pseudopteris Baill. (3; Madagascar)
- Stadtmannia Lam. (6; East Tropical Africa, Madagascar, Mauritius)
- Tsingya Capuron (1; Madagascar)

=== Tribe Thouiniaeae ===
Blume (1847). Type: Thouinia Poit.

- Allophylastrum Acev.-Rodr. (1 species; Brazil, Guyana)
- Allophylus L.(211; Pantropical)
- Thouinia Poit. (c. 30; West indies, Central America)

=== Tribe Tristiropsideae ===
Buerki & Callm. (2021). Type: Tristiropsis Radlk.

- Tristiropsis Radlk. (3 species; Malesia & Australasia)

=== Tribe Ungnadieae ===
Buerki & Callm. (2021). Type: Ungnadia Endl.

- Delavaya Franch. (1 species; China)
- Ungnadia Endl. (1; Mexico, Texas)

== Genera ==
Genera include:

- Alatococcus Acev.-Rodr.
- Alectryon Gaertn.
- Allophylastrum Acev.-Rodr.
- Allophylus Carl Linnaeus
- Amesiodendron Hu
- Aporrhiza Radlk.
- Arytera Blume
- Atalaya Blume
- Athyana Radlk.
- Beguea Capuron
- Bizonula Pellegrin
- Blighia K.D.Koenig
- Blighiopsis Van der Veken
- Blomia Miranda
- Bridgesia Bertero ex Cambess.
- Camptolepis Radlk.
- Cardiospermum L.
- Castanospora F.Muell.
- Chouxia Capuron
- Chytranthus Hook.f.
- Cnesmocarpon Adema
- Conchopetalum Radlk.
- Cubilia Blume
- Cupania L.
- Cupaniopsis Radlk.
- Deinbollia Schumacher
- Delavaya Franch.
- Diatenopteryx Radlk.
- Dictyoneura Blume
- Dilodendron Radlk.
- Dimocarpus Lour.
- Diploglottis Hook.f.
- Elattostachys (Blume) Radlk.
- Eriocoelum Hook.f.
- Erythrophysa E.Mey. ex Arn.
- Gereaua Buerki & Callm.
- Glenniea Hook.f.
- Gloeocarpus Radlk.
- Gongrodiscus Radlk.
- Gongrospermum Radlk.
- Guindilia Gillies ex Hook. & Arn.
- Guioa Cav.
- Haplocoelopsis F.G.Davies
- Haplocoelum Radlk.
- Hornea Baker
- Jagera Blume
- Koelreuteria Laxm.
- Laccodiscus Radlk.
- Lecaniodiscus Planch. ex Benth.
- Lepiderema Radlk.
- Lepidopetalum Blume
- Lepisanthes Blume
- Litchi Sonn.
- Lophostigma Radlk.
- Lychnodiscus Radlk.
- Macphersonia Blume
- Matayba Aubl.
- Melicoccus P.Browne
- Mischarytera (Radlk.) H.Turner
- Mischocarpus Blume
- Molinaea Comm. ex Juss.
- Namataea D.W.Thomas & D.J.Harris
- Nephelium L.
- Otonephelium Radlk.
- Pancovia Willd.
- Pappea Eckl. & Zeyh.
- Paranephelium Miq.
- Paullinia L.
- Pavieasia Pierre
- Pentascyphus Radlk.
- Phyllotrichum Thorel ex Lecomte
- Placodiscus Radlk.
- Plagioscyphus Radlk.
- Podonephelium Baill.
- Pometia J.R.Forst. & G.Forst.
- Porocystis Radlk.
- Pseudima Radlk.
- Pseudopancovia Pellegr.
- Pseudopteris Baill.
- Radlkofera Gilg
- Rhysotoechia Radlk.
- Sapindus L.
- Sarcopteryx Radlk.
- Sarcotoechia Radlk.
- Schleichera Willd.
- Scyphonychium Radlk.
- Serjania Mill.
- Sinoradlkofera F.Meyer
- Sisyrolepis Radlk.
- Smelophyllum Radlk.
- Stadmania Lam.
- Stocksia Benth.
- Storthocalyx Radlk.
- Synima Radlk.
- Talisia Aubl.
- Thinouia Triana & Planch.
- Thouinia Poit.
- Thouinidium Radlk.
- Tina Schult.
- Toechima Radlk.
- Toulicia Aubl.
- Trigonachras Radlk.
- Tripterodendron Radlk.
- Tristira Radlk.
- Tristiropsis Radlk.
- Tsingya Capuron
- Ungnadia Endl.
- Urvillea Kunth
- Vouarana Aubl.
- Xerospermum Blume
- Zollingeria Kurz
