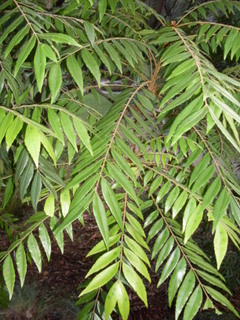
- Jagera pseudorhus foliage

Scientific classification
- Kingdom: Plantae
- Clade: Tracheophytes
- Clade: Angiosperms
- Clade: Eudicots
- Clade: Rosids
- Order: Sapindales
- Family: Sapindaceae
- Tribe: Cupanieae
- Genus: Jagera; Blume

Type species
- Jagera speciosa Blume

Species
- See text

= Jagera (plant) =

Genus of flowering plant

Jagera is a genus of plants in the lychee and maple family, Sapindaceae. It is native to the Moluccas, New Guinea, and the Australian states of Queensland and New South Wales. The genus is named after Herbert de Jager, a collector for botanist Georg Eberhard Rumphius.

== Description ==
Plants in this genus are trees or shrubs, with divided (paripinnate) leaves. The leaves are whorled or opposite and the leaflets have serrated edges. The small flowers have five petals and sepals and are born on axillary inflorescences. The fruit are three- or four-celled capsules with stiff rusty coloured hairs on the surface.

== Taxonomy ==
The genus was erected by German-Dutch botanist Carl Ludwig Blume in 1847 to accommodate his newly-described species Jagera speciosa. That taxon was not validly published and is now a synonym of J. javanica.

=== Accepted species ===
Three species are accepted as of April 2026:

- Jagera javanica (Blume) Blume ex Kalkman
- Jagera madida P.I.Forst.
- Jagera pseudorhus (A.Rich.) Radlk

=== Formerly included here: ===
The following taxa have either been transferred from Jagera to other genera or relegated to synonomic status.

- Jagera dasyantha (Radlk.) S.T.Reynolds – now Cnesmocarpon dasyantha (Radlk.) Adema
- Jagera discolor L.S.Sm. ex S.T.Reynolds – now Cnesmocarpon dasyantha (Radlk.) Adema
- Jagera glabra Hassk. – now Elattostachys verrucosa (Blume) Radlk.
- Jagera latifolia Radlk. – now Alectryon ferrugineus (Blume) Radlk.
- Jagera macrophylla Radlk. – now Jagera javanica (Blume) Blume ex Kalkman
- Jagera madagascariensis Blume – now Tina chapelieriana (Cambess.) Kalkman
- Jagera roxburghii Blume – now Jagera javanica (Blume) Blume ex Kalkman
- Jagera serrata (Roxb.) Radlk. – now Jagera javanica (Blume) Blume ex Kalkman
- Jagera speciosa Blume – now Jagera javanica (Blume) Blume ex Kalkman
- Jagera javanica subsp. australiana Leenh. – now Jagera madida P.I.Forst.
- Jagera pseudorhus f. genuina Radlk. – now Jagera pseudorhus var. pseudorhus
- Jagera pseudorhus f. pilosiuscula Radlk. – now Jagera pseudorhus var. pseudorhus
- Jagera pseudorhus f. subglabrescens Domin – now Jagera pseudorhus var. pseudorhus
- Jagera serrata f. fulvinervis Radlk. – now Jagera javanica (Blume) Blume ex Kalkman

== See also ==
- Cnesmocarpon
- Trigonachras
