= Pentascyphus =

Scientific classification
- Kingdom: Plantae
- Clade: Tracheophytes
- Clade: Angiosperms
- Clade: Eudicots
- Clade: Rosids
- Order: Sapindales
- Family: Sapindaceae
- Subfamily: Sapindoideae
- Tribe: Cupanieae
- Genus: Pentascyphus; Radlk.
- Species: P. thyrsiflorus

Binomial name
- Pentascyphus thyrsiflorus Radlk.

Genus of plants

Pentascyphus is a genus of flowering plants belonging to the family Sapindaceae. The only species is Pentascyphus thyrsiflorus.

Its native range is French Guiana to Northern and Northeastern Brazil.
