= H. africana =

H. africana may refer to:

- Haplocoelopsis africana, a plant species found in Kenya, Tanzania and possibly Angola
- Hydnora africana, an achlorophyllous plant native to southern Africa parasitic on the roots of members of the Euphorbiaceae

== See also ==
- Africana (disambiguation)
