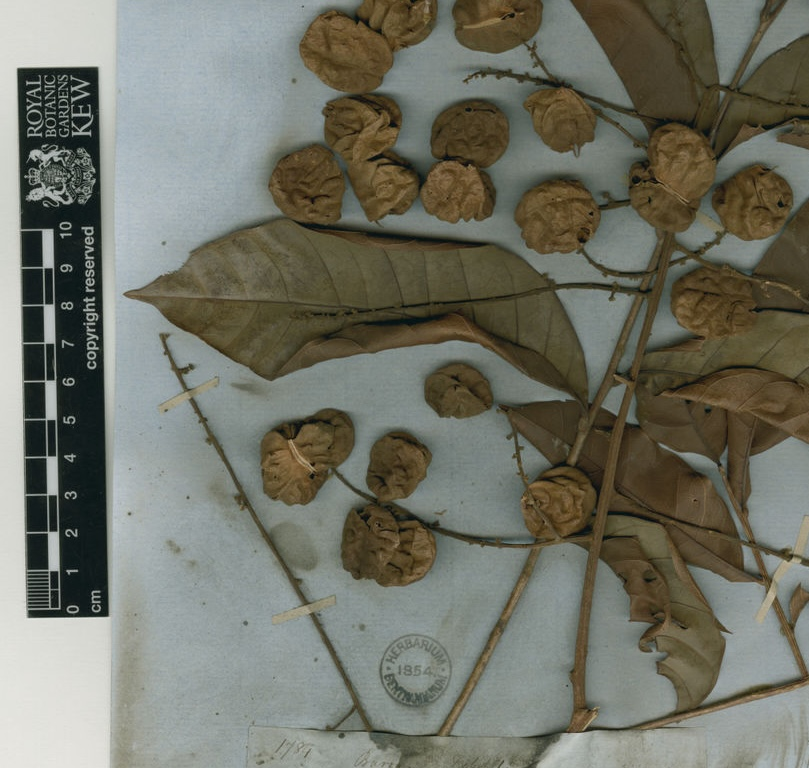
- Porocystis

Scientific classification
- Kingdom: Plantae
- Clade: Tracheophytes
- Clade: Angiosperms
- Clade: Eudicots
- Clade: Rosids
- Order: Sapindales
- Family: Sapindaceae
- Subfamily: Sapindoideae
- Genus: Porocystis; Radlk.

= Porocystis =

Genus of plants

Porocystis is a genus of flowering plants belonging to the family Sapindaceae.

Its native range is Guianas to Northern Brazil.

Species:

- Porocystis acuminata (Radlk.) Acev.-Rodr.
- Porocystis toulicioides Radlk.
