= Hornea =

Hornea may refer to:

- Hornea (plant), a genus of plants in the family Sapindaceae
- Hornea, a genus of reptiles in the family Elapidae, synonym of Simoselaps
- Hornea, an extinct genus of plants in the family Horneophytaceae, synonym of Horneophyton
