= Laccodiscus =

Scientific classification
- Kingdom: Plantae
- Clade: Tracheophytes
- Clade: Angiosperms
- Clade: Eudicots
- Clade: Rosids
- Order: Sapindales
- Family: Sapindaceae
- Tribe: Nephelieae
- Genus: Laccodiscus; Radlk.

Genus of plants

Laccodiscus is a genus of flowering plants belonging to the family Sapindaceae.

Its native range is Nigeria to Western Central Tropical Africa.

Species:

- Laccodiscus ferrugineus (Baker) Radlk.
- Laccodiscus klaineanus Pierre ex Engl.
- Laccodiscus pseudostipularis Radlk. ex Engl.
- Laccodiscus spinulosodentatus Radlk. ex Engl.
