= Tristira =

Tristira may refer to:

- Tristira (grasshopper), a genus of insects in the family Tristiridae
- Tristira (plant), a genus of flowering plants in the family Sapindaceae
