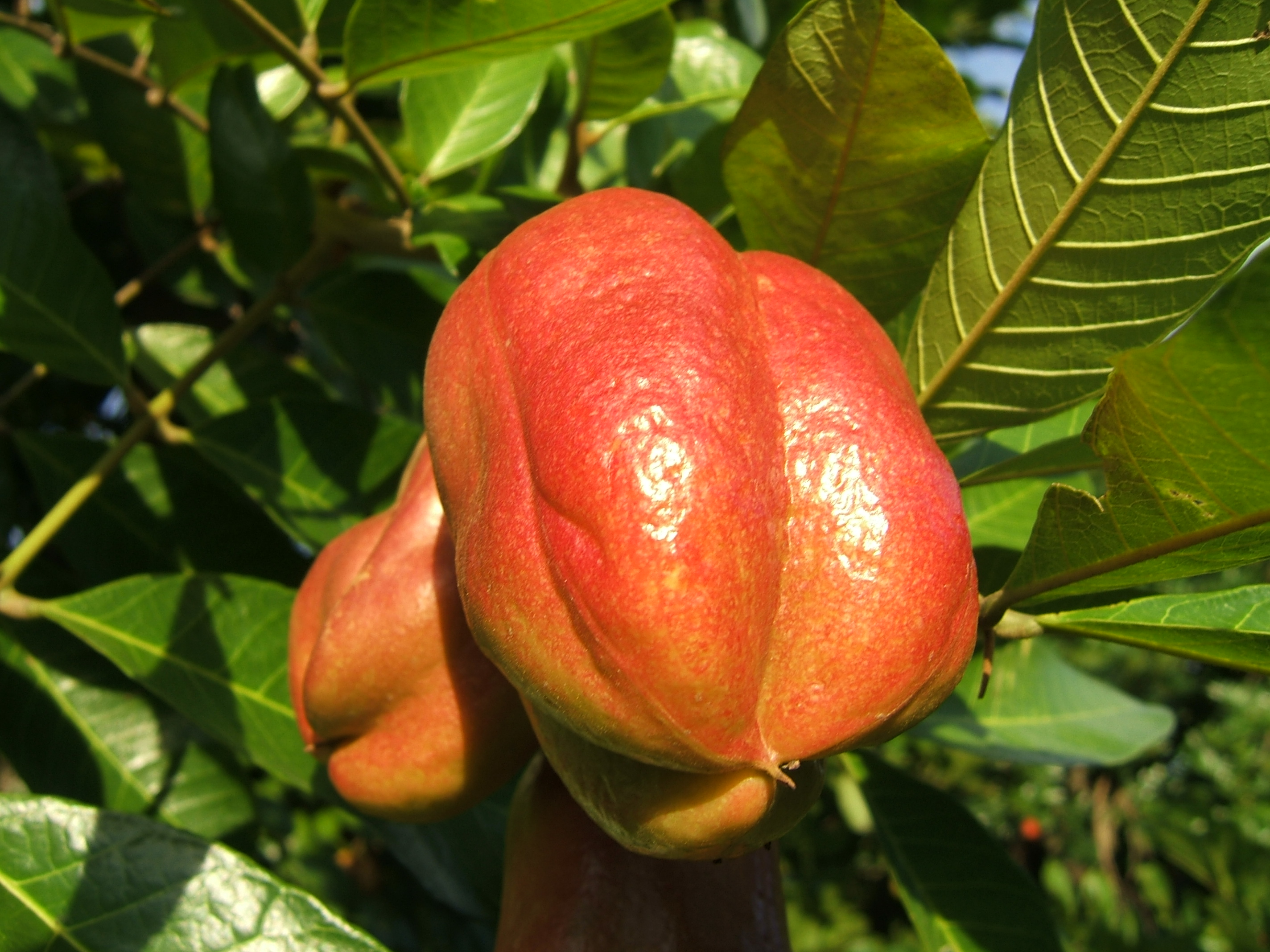
- Blighia sapida

Scientific classification
- Kingdom: Plantae
- Clade: Tracheophytes
- Clade: Angiosperms
- Clade: Eudicots
- Clade: Rosids
- Order: Sapindales
- Family: Sapindaceae
- Subfamily: Sapindoideae
- Tribe: Nephelieae
- Genus: Blighia; K.D.Koenig (1806)

Species
- 3; see text

Synonyms
- Akea Stokes (1812); Akeesia Tussac (1808); Bonannia Raf. (1814); Phialodiscus Radlk. (1879)

= Blighia =

Genus of flowering plants

Blighia is a genus of three species of flowering plants in the soapberry family, Sapindaceae. They are trees or large shrubs native to tropical Africa from Guinea east to Kenya, and south to Angola and KwaZulu-Natal. The fruit is partly edible, with the Ackee (B. sapida) being grown commercially for fruit production. The genus is named for Captain William Bligh (formerly of HMS Bounty), who brought samples back to England.

The species are evergreen trees growing to 10–20 metres (33–66 ft) tall, with pinnate leaves. The flowers are produced in small panicles. The fruit is an oval capsule 4–8 centimetres (2–3 in) long containing three seeds, each surrounded by an edible fleshy yellow aril, and a thick, leathery orange or red skin; the fruit apart from the aril is very poisonous.

== Species ==
3 species are accepted:

- Blighia sapida K.D.Koenig - Ackee
- Blighia unijugata Baker
- Blighia welwitschii (Hiern) Radlk.
