= Athyana =

Conservation status
- Vulnerable (IUCN 2.3)

Scientific classification
- Kingdom: Plantae
- Clade: Tracheophytes
- Clade: Angiosperms
- Clade: Eudicots
- Clade: Rosids
- Order: Sapindales
- Family: Sapindaceae
- Subfamily: Sapindoideae
- Genus: Athyana (Griseb.) Radlk.
- Species: A. weinmannifolia

Binomial name
- Athyana weinmannifolia (Griseb.) Radlk.

Genus of flowering plants

Athyana is a monospecific genus of plant in the family Sapindaceae, containing only Athyana weinmanniifolia. It is found in Argentina and Bolivia. It is threatened by habitat loss.
