= Haplocoelum inoploeum =

Scientific classification
- Kingdom: Plantae
- Clade: Tracheophytes
- Clade: Angiosperms
- Clade: Eudicots
- Clade: Rosids
- Order: Sapindales
- Family: Sapindaceae
- Genus: Haplocoelum
- Species: H. inoploeum

Binomial name
- Haplocoelum inoploeum Radlk.

Synonyms
- Filicium somalense Chiov.; Haplocoelum trigonocarpum Radlk.; Haplocoelum wakefieldii (Engl.) Chiov.; Pistaciopsis wakefieldii Engl.

Species of flowering plant

Haplocoelum inoploeum, synonyms including Haplocoelum trigonocarpum, is a species of plant in the family Sapindaceae. It is found in Kenya, Somalia, and Tanzania.
