= Gongrospermum =

Conservation status
- Endangered (IUCN 3.1)

Scientific classification
- Kingdom: Plantae
- Clade: Tracheophytes
- Clade: Angiosperms
- Clade: Eudicots
- Clade: Rosids
- Order: Sapindales
- Family: Sapindaceae
- Subfamily: Sapindoideae
- Genus: Gongrospermum; Radlk.
- Species: G. philippinense

Binomial name
- Gongrospermum philippinense Radlk.

Genus of flowering plants

Gongrospermum is a monotypic plant genus of Sapindaceae endemic to the Philippines, on Luzon.

It only contains one species: Gongrospermum philippinense.
