= Haplocoelum =

Scientific classification
- Kingdom: Plantae
- Clade: Tracheophytes
- Clade: Angiosperms
- Clade: Eudicots
- Clade: Rosids
- Order: Sapindales
- Family: Sapindaceae
- Subfamily: Sapindoideae
- Genus: Haplocoelum; Radlk.

Genus of flowering plants

Haplocoelum is a genus of plants in the family Sapindaceae. It contains the following species (but this list may be incomplete):

- Haplocoelum acuminatum Radlk. ex Engl.
- Haplocoelum foliolosum (Hiern) Bullock
- Haplocoelum inoploeum Radlk.
- Haplocoelum intermedium Hauman
