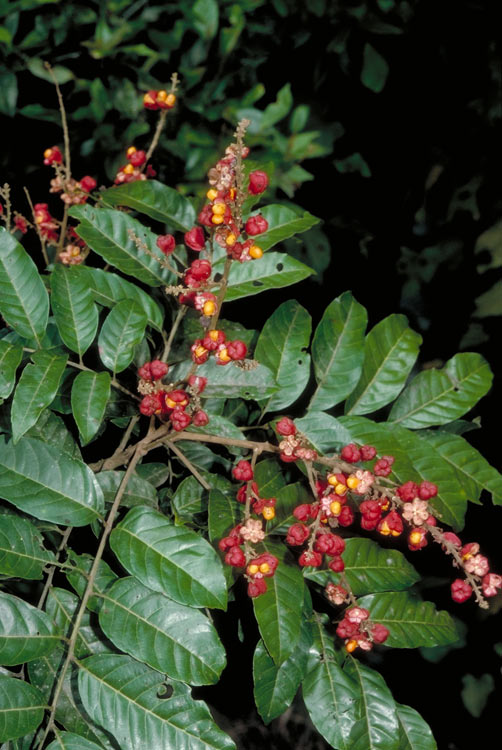
- Synima cordierorum

Scientific classification
- Kingdom: Plantae
- Clade: Tracheophytes
- Clade: Angiosperms
- Clade: Eudicots
- Clade: Rosids
- Order: Sapindales
- Family: Sapindaceae
- Tribe: Cupanieae
- Genus: Synima; Radlk.

Species
- See text

= Synima =

Genus of trees

Synima is a genus of tropical rainforest trees, constituting part of the plant family Sapindaceae.

Three species are known to science as of July 2013, found growing naturally in north eastern Queensland, Australia, and in New Guinea.

== Species ==
This listing was sourced from the Australian Plant Name Index and Australian Plant Census, the Australian Tropical Rainforest Plants (2010) information system, original taxonomic research publications, Flora Malesiana and the Flora of Australia.

- Synima cordierorum (F.Muell.) Radlk. – NE. Qld and New Guinea
- Synima macrophylla S.T.Reynolds – NE. Qld and New Guinea
- Synima reynoldsiae P.I.Forst. – NE. Qld endemic
