= Lophostigma =

Lophostigma may refer to:

- Lophostigma (wasp), a genus of wasps in the family Mutillidae
- Lophostigma (plant), a genus of plants in the family Sapindaceae
