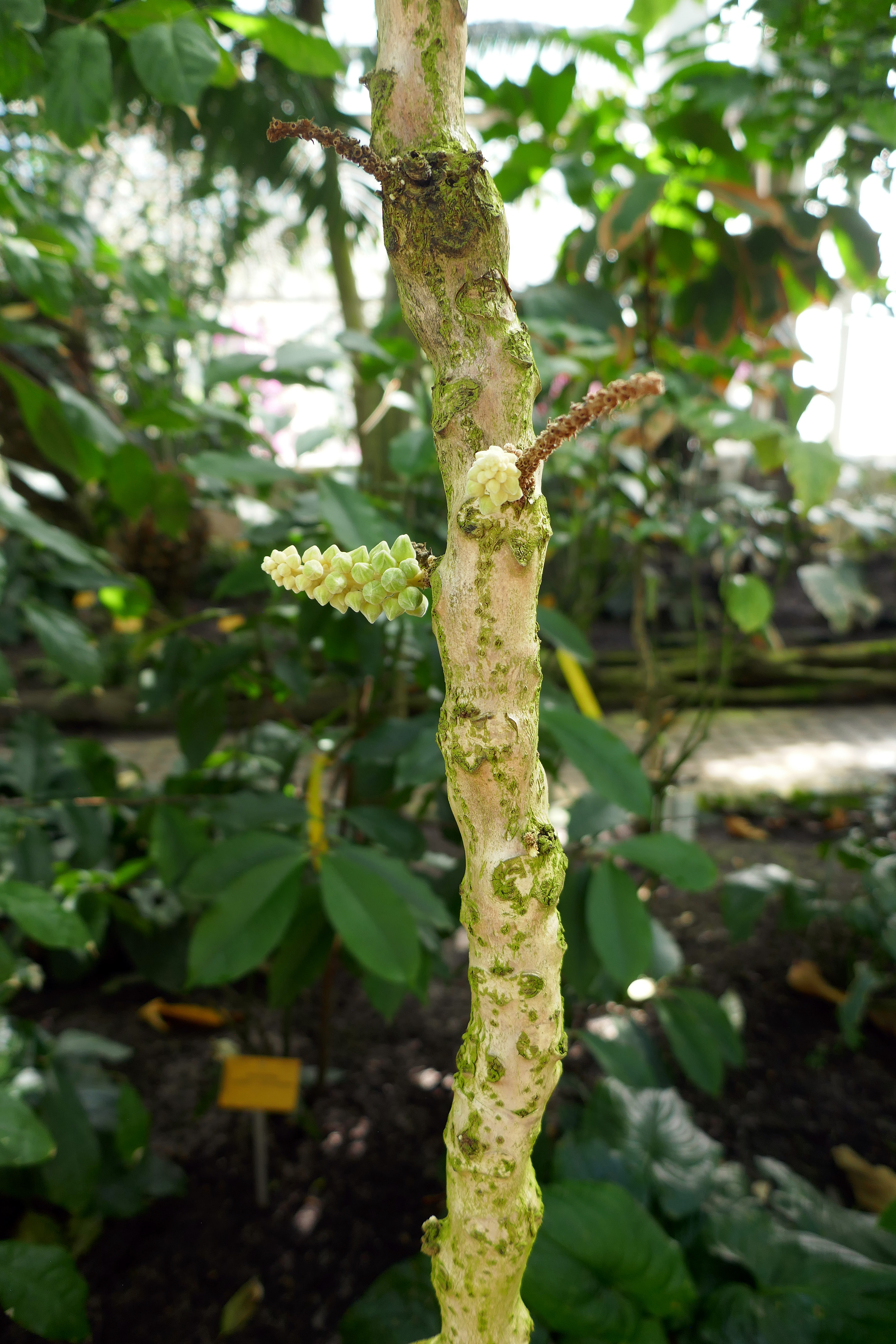

Scientific classification
- Kingdom: Plantae
- Clade: Tracheophytes
- Clade: Angiosperms
- Clade: Eudicots
- Clade: Rosids
- Order: Sapindales
- Family: Sapindaceae
- Tribe: Nephelieae
- Genus: Chytranthus; Hook.f. (1862)

Synonyms
- Glossolepis Gilg (1897)

= Chytranthus =

Genus of flowering plants

Chytranthus is a genus of flowering plants belonging to the family Sapindaceae. It includes 32 species of small trees and shrubs native to tropical Africa, ranging from Guinea eastwards to Kenya and Tanzania and south to Angola. Most species have a palm-like habit, with large pinnate leaves and unbranched trunks.

Species:

- Chytranthus angustifolius Exell
- Chytranthus atroviolaceus Baker f. ex Hutch. & Dalziel
- Chytranthus calophyllus Radlk. ex Engl.
- Chytranthus carneus Radlk.
- Chytranthus cauliflorus (Hutch. & Dalziel) Wickens
- Chytranthus dasystachys Gilg ex Engl.
- Chytranthus dinklagei Gilg ex Engl.
- Chytranthus edulis Pierre
- Chytranthus ellipticus Hutch. & Dalziel
- Chytranthus flavoviridis Radlk. ex Engl.
- Chytranthus gilletii De Wild.
- Chytranthus imenoensis Pellegr.
- Chytranthus klaineanus Radlk. ex Engl.
- Chytranthus ledermannii Gilg ex Radlk.
- Chytranthus longibracteatus F.G.Davies
- Chytranthus macrobotrys (Gilg) Exell & Mendonça
- Chytranthus macrophyllus Gilg
- Chytranthus mannii Benth. & Hook.f.
- Chytranthus micranthus Gilg ex Radlk.
- Chytranthus mortehanii (De Wild.) De Voldere ex Hauman
- Chytranthus obliquinervis Radlk. ex Engl.
- Chytranthus prieurianus Baill.
- Chytranthus punctatus Radlk.
- Chytranthus setosus Radlk.
- Chytranthus sexlocularis Radlk.
- Chytranthus stenophyllus Gilg
- Chytranthus strigosus Radlk. ex Engl.
- Chytranthus subvilliger Radlk.
- Chytranthus talbotii (Baker f.) Keay
- Chytranthus verecundus N.Hallé & Ake Assi
- Chytranthus welwitschii Exell
- Chytranthus xanthophyllus Radlk. ex Engl.
