= Gloeocarpus =

Conservation status
- Endangered (IUCN 2.3)

Scientific classification
- Kingdom: Plantae
- Clade: Tracheophytes
- Clade: Angiosperms
- Clade: Eudicots
- Clade: Rosids
- Order: Sapindales
- Family: Sapindaceae
- Tribe: Cupanieae
- Genus: Gloeocarpus; Radlk.
- Species: G. patentivalvis

Binomial name
- Gloeocarpus patentivalvis (Radlk.) Radlk.

Genus of flowering plants

Gloeocarpus is a genus of Sapindaceae containing the single plant species Gloeocarpus patentivalvis. It is endemic to the Philippines.
