= Blomia prisca =

Conservation status
- Least Concern (IUCN 3.1)

Scientific classification
- Kingdom: Plantae
- Clade: Tracheophytes
- Clade: Angiosperms
- Clade: Eudicots
- Clade: Rosids
- Order: Sapindales
- Family: Sapindaceae
- Subfamily: Sapindoideae
- Genus: Blomia; Miranda (1953)
- Species: B. prisca

Binomial name
- Blomia prisca (Standl.) Lundell (1961)

Synonyms
- Tikalia Lundell (1961); Blomia cupanioides Miranda (1953); Cupania prisca Standl. (1935); Tikalia prisca (Standl.) Lundell (1961)

Genus of flowering plants

Blomia prisca is a species of flowering plant belonging to the family Sapindaceae. It is the sole species in genus Blomia. It is a tree native to Guatemala, Belize, and southeastern Mexico.
