= Camptolepis ramiflora =

Conservation status
- Vulnerable (IUCN 2.3)

Scientific classification
- Kingdom: Plantae
- Clade: Tracheophytes
- Clade: Angiosperms
- Clade: Eudicots
- Clade: Rosids
- Order: Sapindales
- Family: Sapindaceae
- Genus: Camptolepis
- Species: C. ramiflora

Binomial name
- Camptolepis ramiflora (Taub.) Radlk.

Species of flowering plant

Camptolepis ramiflora is a species of plant in the family Sapindaceae. It is found in Somalia along the lower Jubba River into eastern Kenya and Tanzania. Information on the possible occurrence in Madagascar may alter the current status of the species. Although the range appears extensive, subpopulations are localised and confined to habitat loss.
