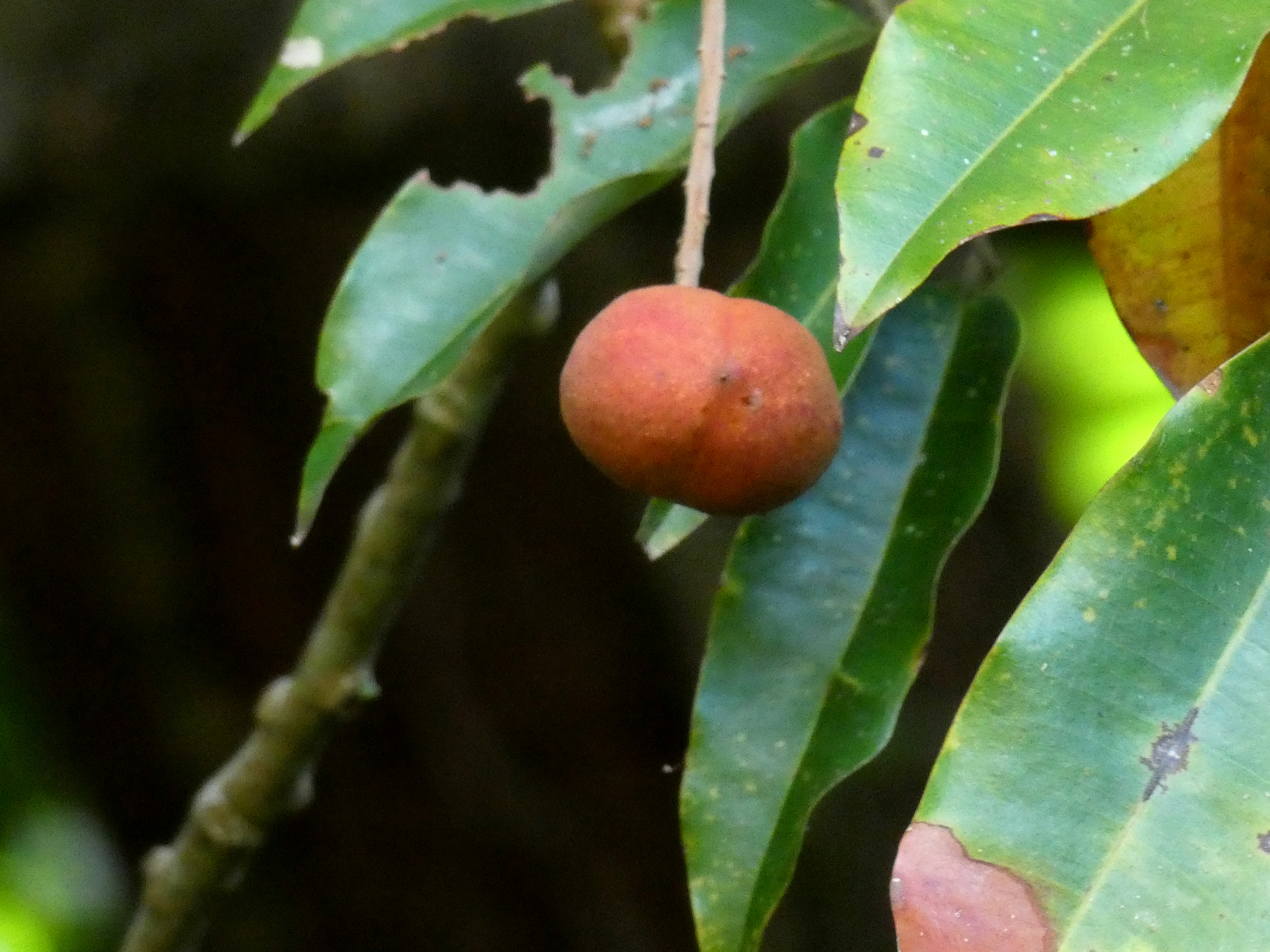
- Fruit

Conservation status
- Least Concern (NCA)

Scientific classification
- Kingdom: Plantae
- Clade: Tracheophytes
- Clade: Angiosperms
- Clade: Eudicots
- Clade: Rosids
- Order: Sapindales
- Family: Sapindaceae
- Tribe: Cupanieae
- Genus: Castanospora; F.Muell
- Species: C. alphandii

Binomial name
- Castanospora alphandii (F.Muell.) F.Muell.

= Castanospora =

Genus of flowering plants

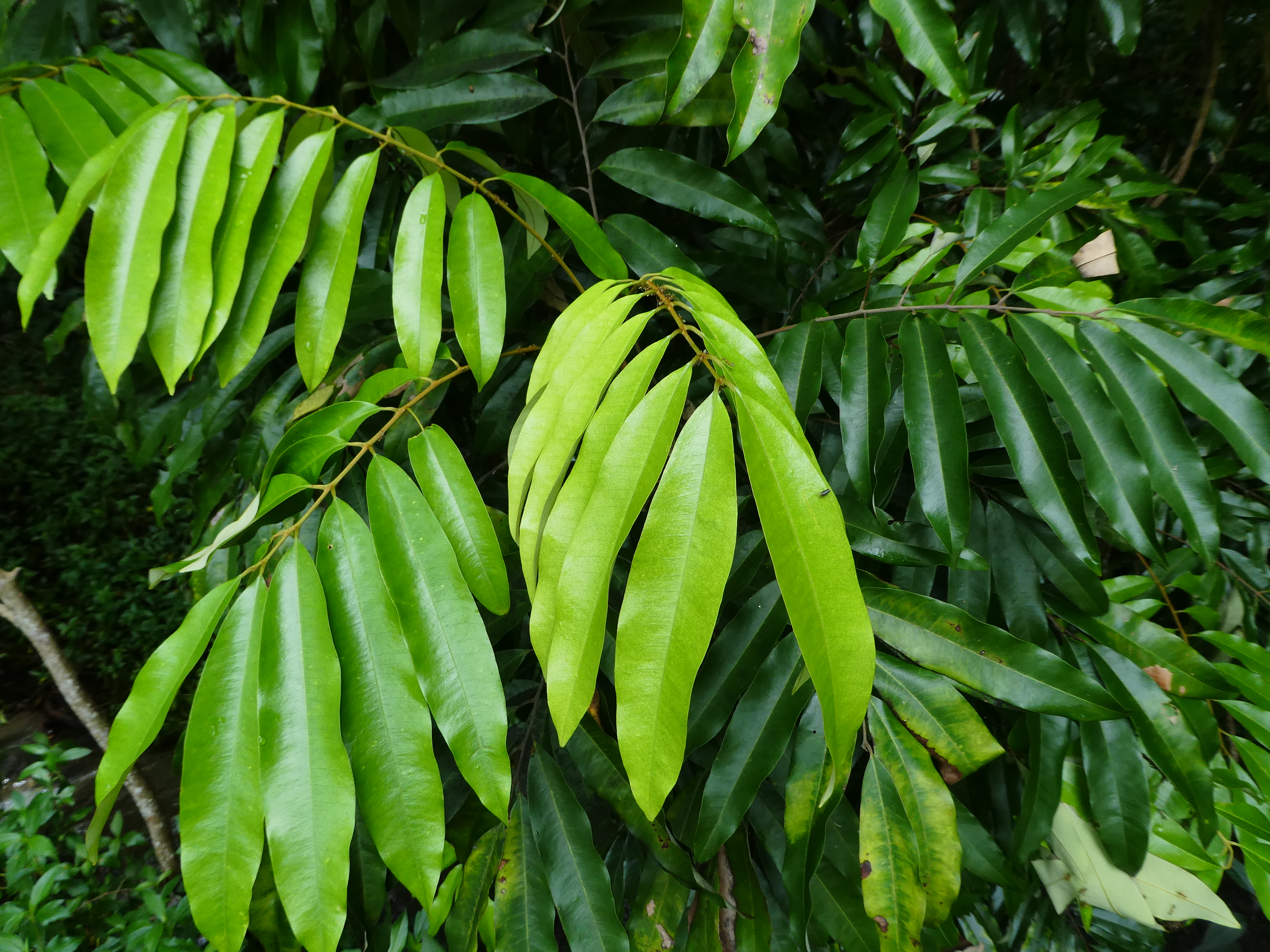
Foliage

Castanospora is a monotypic genus (i.e. a genus containing only one species) in the maple and lychee family Sapindaceae. The sole species is Castanospora alphandii, commonly known as brown tamarind, which grows naturally in rainforests of eastern Australia from about Coffs Harbour in mid north New South Wales, as far north as Rossville in far north Queensland.
