= Scyphonychium =

Scientific classification
- Kingdom: Plantae
- Clade: Tracheophytes
- Clade: Angiosperms
- Clade: Eudicots
- Clade: Rosids
- Order: Sapindales
- Family: Sapindaceae
- Genus: Scyphonychium; Radlk.
- Species: S. multiflorum

Binomial name
- Scyphonychium multiflorum (Mart.) Radlk.

Genus of plants

Scyphonychium is a monotypic genus of flowering plants belonging to the family Sapindaceae. The only species is Scyphonychium multiflorum.

Its native range is French Guiana to Northern and Northeastern Brazil.
