= Lepidocupania =

Scientific classification
- Kingdom: Plantae
- Clade: Tracheophytes
- Clade: Angiosperms
- Clade: Eudicots
- Clade: Rosids
- Order: Sapindales
- Family: Sapindaceae
- Subfamily: Sapindoideae
- Tribe: Cupanieae
- Genus: Lepidocupania; Buerki, Callm., Munzinger & Lowry (2020)

Species
- 21; see text

Genus of flowering plants

Lepidocupania is a genus of flowering plants in family Sapindaceae. It contains 21 species native to the tropical west Pacific, including the Caroline Islands, Fiji, New Caledonia, Samoan Islands, Solomon Islands, Tonga, and Vanuatu.

- Lepidocupania arcuata (Radlk.) Buerki, Callm., Munzinger & Lowry
- Lepidocupania brackenridgei (A.Gray) Buerki, Callm., Munzinger & Lowry
- Lepidocupania concolor (Gillespie) Buerki, Callm., Munzinger & Lowry
- Lepidocupania fruticosa (Radlk.) Buerki, Callm., Munzinger & Lowry
- Lepidocupania glabra (Adema) Buerki, Callm., Munzinger & Lowry
- Lepidocupania globosa (Adema) Buerki, Callm., Munzinger & Lowry
- Lepidocupania glomeriflora (Radlk.) Buerki, Callm., Munzinger & Lowry
- Lepidocupania gracilipes (Radlk.) Buerki, Callm., Munzinger & Lowry
- Lepidocupania grandiflora (Adema) Buerki, Callm., Munzinger & Lowry
- Lepidocupania guillauminii (Kaneh.) Buerki, Callm., Munzinger & Lowry
- Lepidocupania inoplea (Radlk.) Buerki, Callm., Munzinger & Lowry
- Lepidocupania lepidota (Radlk.) Buerki, Callm., Munzinger & Lowry
- Lepidocupania mouana (Guillaumin) Buerki, Callm., Munzinger & Lowry
- Lepidocupania myrmoctona (Radlk.) Buerki, Callm., Munzinger & Lowry
- Lepidocupania oedipoda (Radlk.) Buerki, Callm., Munzinger & Lowry
- Lepidocupania pennelii (Guillaumin) Buerki, Callm., Munzinger & Lowry
- Lepidocupania rosea (Adema) Buerki, Callm., Munzinger & Lowry
- Lepidocupania samoensis (Christoph.) Buerki, Callm., Munzinger & Lowry
- Lepidocupania squamosa (Adema) Buerki, Callm., Munzinger & Lowry
- Lepidocupania subfalcata (Adema) Buerki, Callm., Munzinger & Lowry
- Lepidocupania tontoutensis (Guillaumin) Buerki, Callm., Munzinger & Lowry
