= Pancovia =

Scientific classification
- Kingdom: Plantae
- Clade: Tracheophytes
- Clade: Angiosperms
- Clade: Eudicots
- Clade: Rosids
- Order: Sapindales
- Family: Sapindaceae
- Tribe: Nephelieae
- Genus: Pancovia; Willd.

Genus of plants

Pancovia is a genus of flowering plants belonging to the family Sapindaceae.

Its native range is Tropical and Southern Africa.

== Species ==
Species:

- Pancovia bijuga Willd.
- Pancovia floribunda Pellegr.
- Pancovia golungensis (Hiern) Exell & Mendonça
- Pancovia harmsiana Gilg
- Pancovia hildebrandtii Gilg
- Pancovia holtzii Gilg ex Radlk.
- Pancovia laurentii (De Wild.) Gilg ex De Wild.
- Pancovia letestui Pellegr.
- Pancovia lubiniana Belesi
- Pancovia polyantha Gilg ex Engl.
- Pancovia sessiliflora Hutch. & Dalziel
- Pancovia subcuneata Radlk.
- Pancovia turbinata Radlk.
