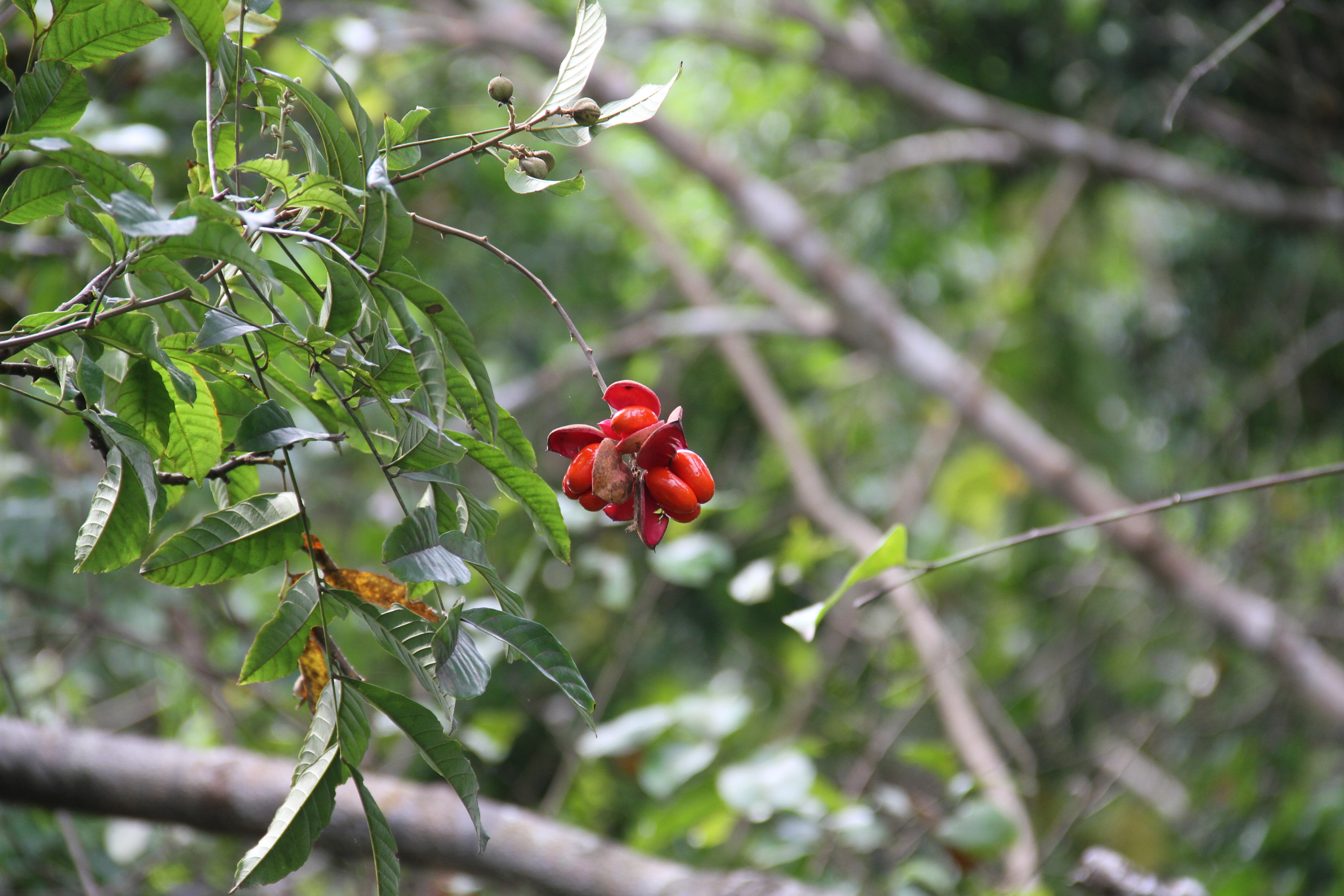
- Lychnodiscus reticulatus

Scientific classification
- Kingdom: Plantae
- Clade: Tracheophytes
- Clade: Angiosperms
- Clade: Eudicots
- Clade: Rosids
- Order: Sapindales
- Family: Sapindaceae
- Genus: Lychnodiscus; Radlk.

= Lychnodiscus =

Genus of plants

Lychnodiscus is a genus of flowering plants belonging to the family Sapindaceae.

Its native range is Western Tropical Africa to Uganda.

Species:

- Lychnodiscus brevibracteatus Fouilloy
- Lychnodiscus cerospermus Radlk.
- Lychnodiscus dananensis Aubrév. & Pellegr.
- Lychnodiscus grandifolius Radlk.
- Lychnodiscus multinervis Radlk.
- Lychnodiscus papillosus Radlk. ex Engl.
- Lychnodiscus reticulatus Radlk.
