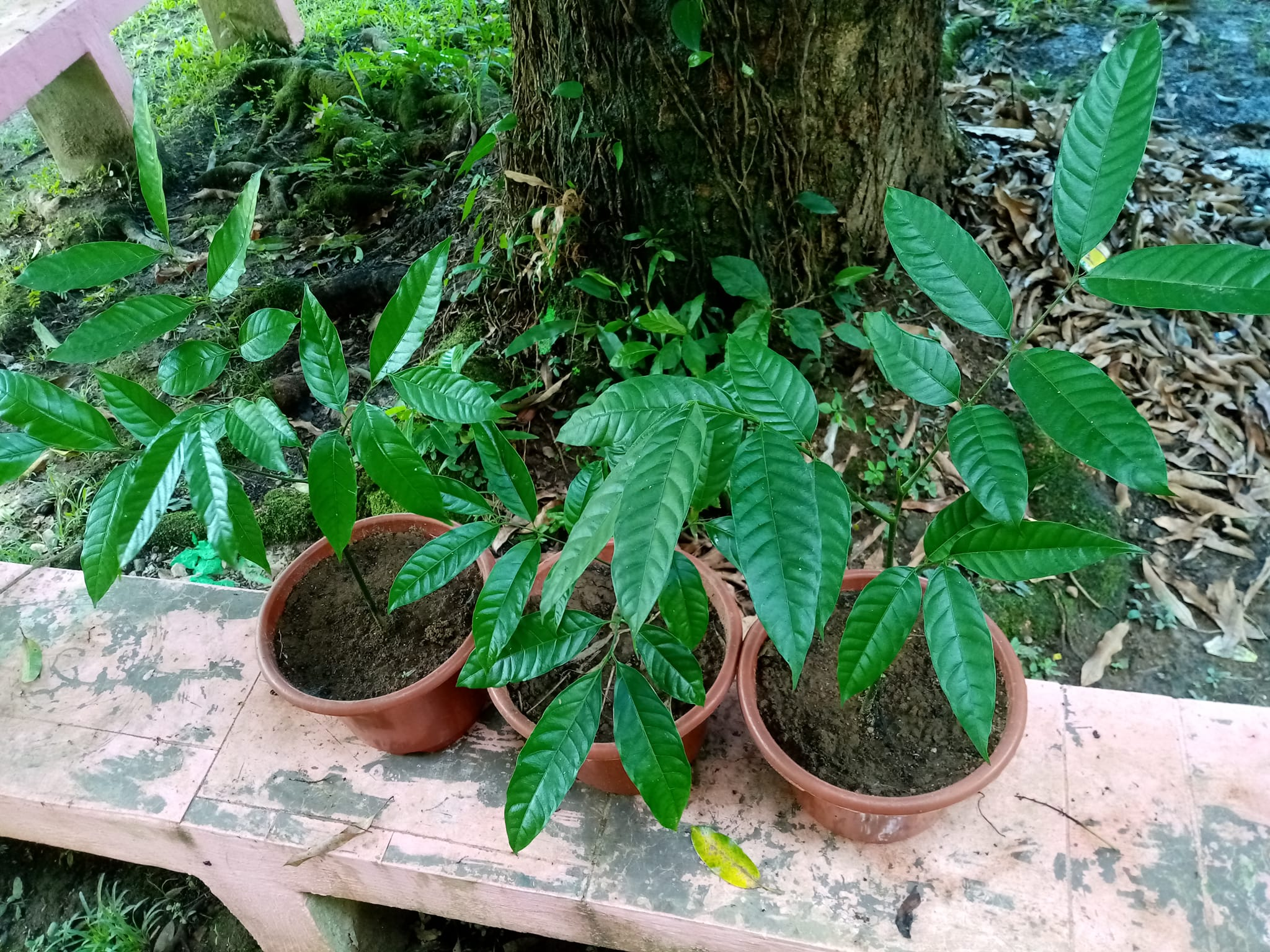
- Seedlings

Conservation status
- Least Concern (IUCN 2.3)

Scientific classification
- Kingdom: Plantae
- Clade: Tracheophytes
- Clade: Angiosperms
- Clade: Eudicots
- Clade: Rosids
- Order: Sapindales
- Family: Sapindaceae
- Subfamily: Sapindoideae
- Tribe: Nephelieae
- Genus: Cubilia; Blume (1847)
- Species: C. cubili

Binomial name
- Cubilia cubili (Blanco) Adelb. (1948)

Synonyms
- Cubilia blancoi Blume (1847), nom. illeg.; Cubilia rumphii Blume (1847); Euphoria cubili Blanco (1837), nom. illeg.

= Cubilia cubili =

Species of plant

Cubilia cubili is a species of flowering plant in the family Sapindaceae. It is a tree native to northeastern Malesia, ranging from eastern Borneo to Sulawesi, the Philippines, and western Maluku. It is the sole species in genus Cubilia.

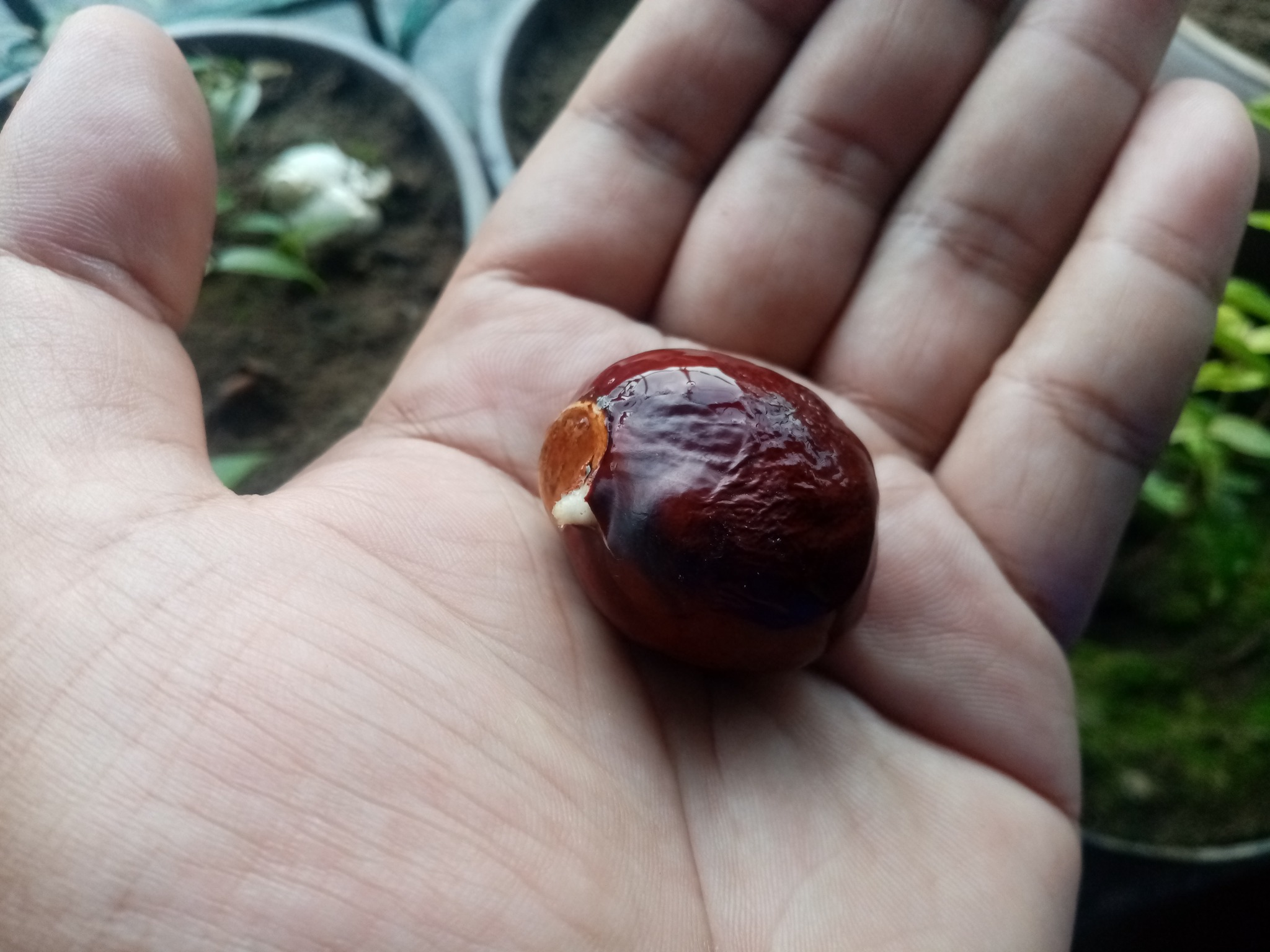
Germinating kubili nut

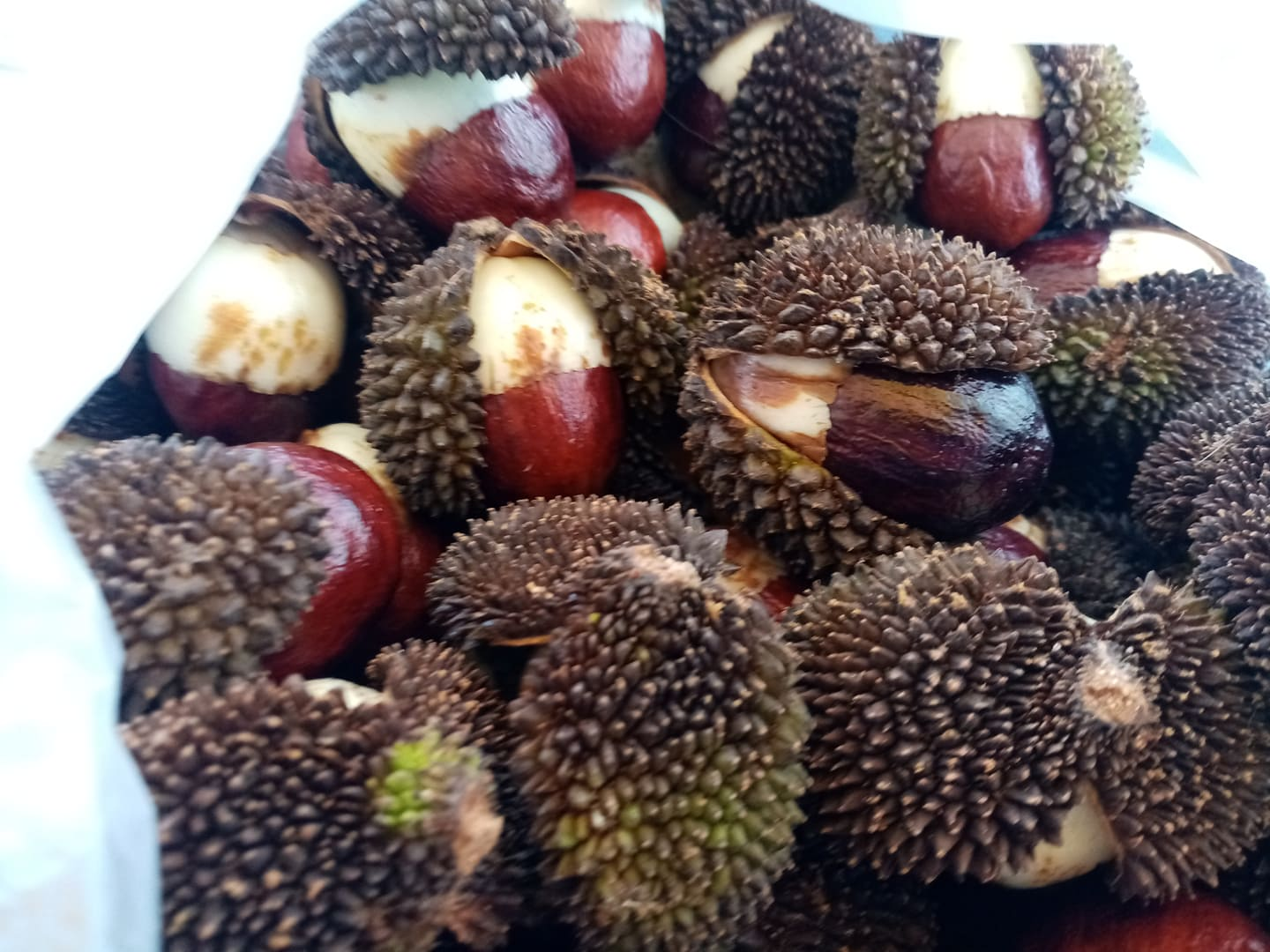
Kubili nuts

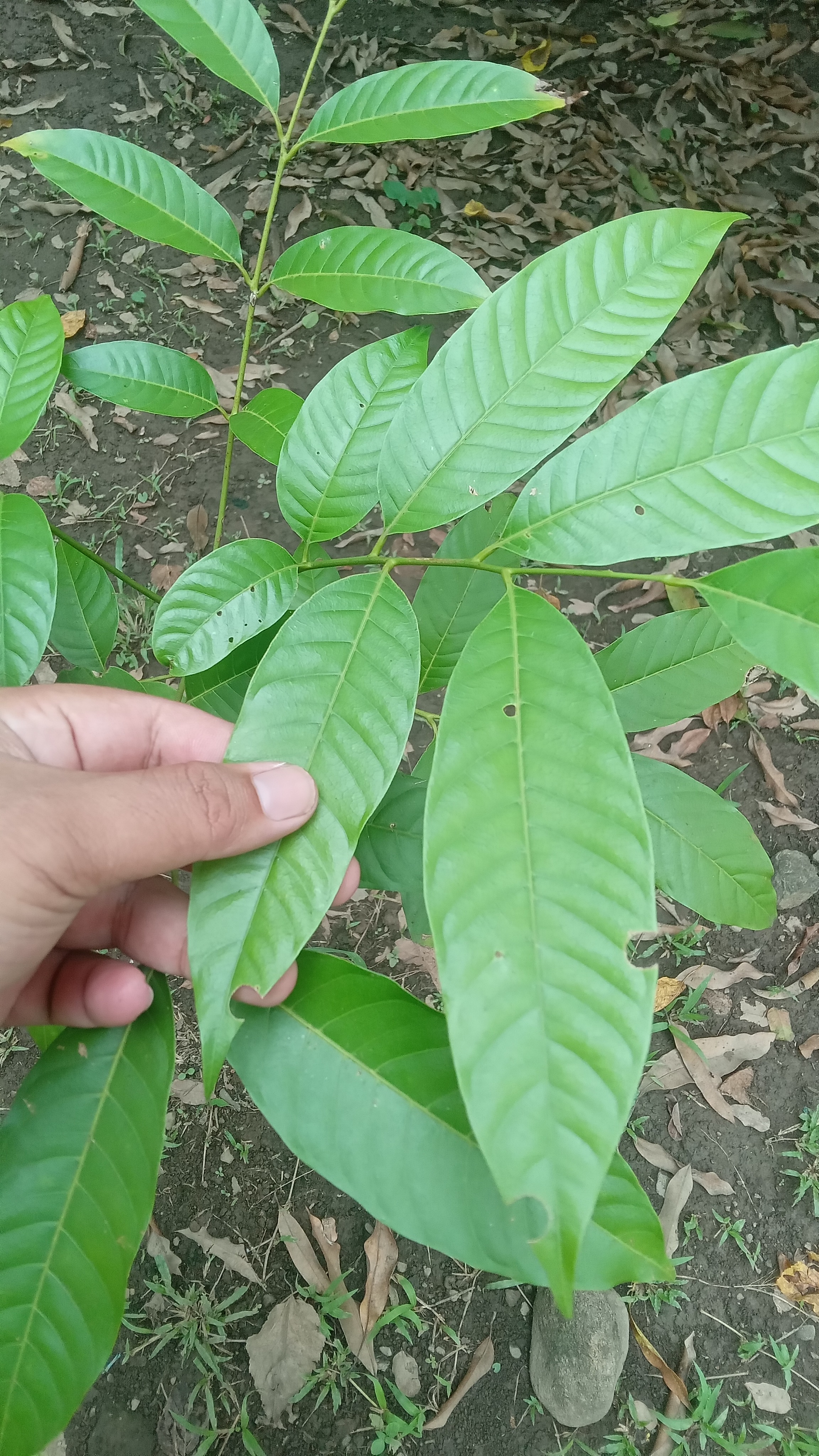
Foliage close up
