= Roy Emile Gereau =

American botanist and explorer (born 1947)

- Born: December 5, 1947 (age 78); Rock Island, Illinois, United States
- Education: University of Iowa
- Known for: Liliaceae (Bomarea), Andean Caryophyllaceae, Rosaceae, Urticaceae
- Scientific career
- Fields: Botany
- Author abbrev. (botany): Gereau

Roy Emile Gereau (born 1947) is an American botanist and explorer.

== Career ==
Educated at the University of Iowa and Michigan Technological University he graduated BA 1969 and taught at Michigan Technological University and Michigan State University (1975-1983), and at the Missouri Botanical Garden, St. Louis, Missouri since 1983, where he has been Assistant Curator since April 2005.

He has conducted botanical expeditions in both Africa (Cameroons, Republic of Congo, Ethiopia, Kenya, Madagascar, Tanzania and Uganda) and the Americas (Costa Rica, Guatemala and Mexico).

== Research interests ==
Gereau has specialised in the Floristics and phytogeography of eastern Africa, he is also engaged in collaborative studies between ethnobotany and archeology.

Gereau is noted for his contributions to the study of the Ancistrocladaceae, Mimosaceae and Sapindales of Africa.

== Publications ==
Gereau has publications to his name in journals such as Annals of the Missouri Botanical Garden, Economic Botany and Novon. He also sits on the editorial board of Annals of the Missouri Botanical Garden and Novon. Along with Jon C. Lovett, Chris K. Ruffo and James RD Taplin, he is the author of Field Guide to the Moist Forest Trees of Tanzania, which was published in 2006. He participates in the Flora Mesoamericana, a collaborative project that is aimed at identifying and describing the vascular plants of Mesoamerica.

In 2010, a genus of plants from Madagascar, Gereaua was named in his honour.

== Sources ==
- Harvard Botanist Index: Roy Emile Gereau
- Missouri Botanical Garden: Roy Emile Gereau
