= Eurycorymbus =

Conservation status
- Near Threatened (IUCN 2.3)

Scientific classification
- Kingdom: Plantae
- Clade: Tracheophytes
- Clade: Angiosperms
- Clade: Eudicots
- Clade: Rosids
- Order: Sapindales
- Family: Sapindaceae
- Tribe: Cupanieae
- Genus: Eurycorymbus; Hand.-Mazz.
- Species: E. cavaleriei

Binomial name
- Eurycorymbus cavaleriei (H.Lév.) Rehder & Hand.-Mazz.

Genus of flowering plants

Eurycorymbus cavaleriei is a species of plant in the family Sapindaceae and the single species in the genus Eurycorymbus. It is found in China and Taiwan, where it is threatened by habitat loss.
