= Trigonachras =

Scientific classification
- Kingdom: Plantae
- Clade: Tracheophytes
- Clade: Angiosperms
- Clade: Eudicots
- Clade: Rosids
- Order: Sapindales
- Family: Sapindaceae
- Tribe: Cupanieae
- Genus: Trigonachras; Radlk.

Type species
- Trigonachras acuta Radlk.

Species
- See text

Genus of trees

Trigonachras is a genus of 8 species of trees known to science, constituting part of the plant family Sapindaceae.

They grow naturally in the rainforests of the Malay Peninsula, Sumatra, Borneo, the Philippines, Sulawesi and New Guinea.

== Species ==
- Trigonachras acuta (Hiern) Radlk. – Sumatra, Malay Peninsula and Borneo
- Trigonachras celebensis Leenh. – Sulawesi
- Trigonachras cultrata (Turcz.) Radlk. – Philippines
- Trigonachras cuspidata Radlk. – Philippines
- Trigonachras papuensis Leenh. – Papua New Guinea
- Trigonachras sp. A Leenh. – Borneo
- Trigonachras sp. B Leenh. – Borneo
- Trigonachras sp. C Leenh. – Philippines
