= Pseudima =

Scientific classification
- Kingdom: Plantae
- Clade: Tracheophytes
- Clade: Angiosperms
- Clade: Eudicots
- Clade: Rosids
- Order: Sapindales
- Family: Sapindaceae
- Genus: Pseudima; Radlk.

Genus of plants

Pseudima is a genus of flowering plants belonging to the family Sapindaceae.

Its native range is Costa Rica to Southern Tropical America.

Species:

- Pseudima frutescens (Aubl.) Radlk.
- Pseudima pallidum Radlk.
