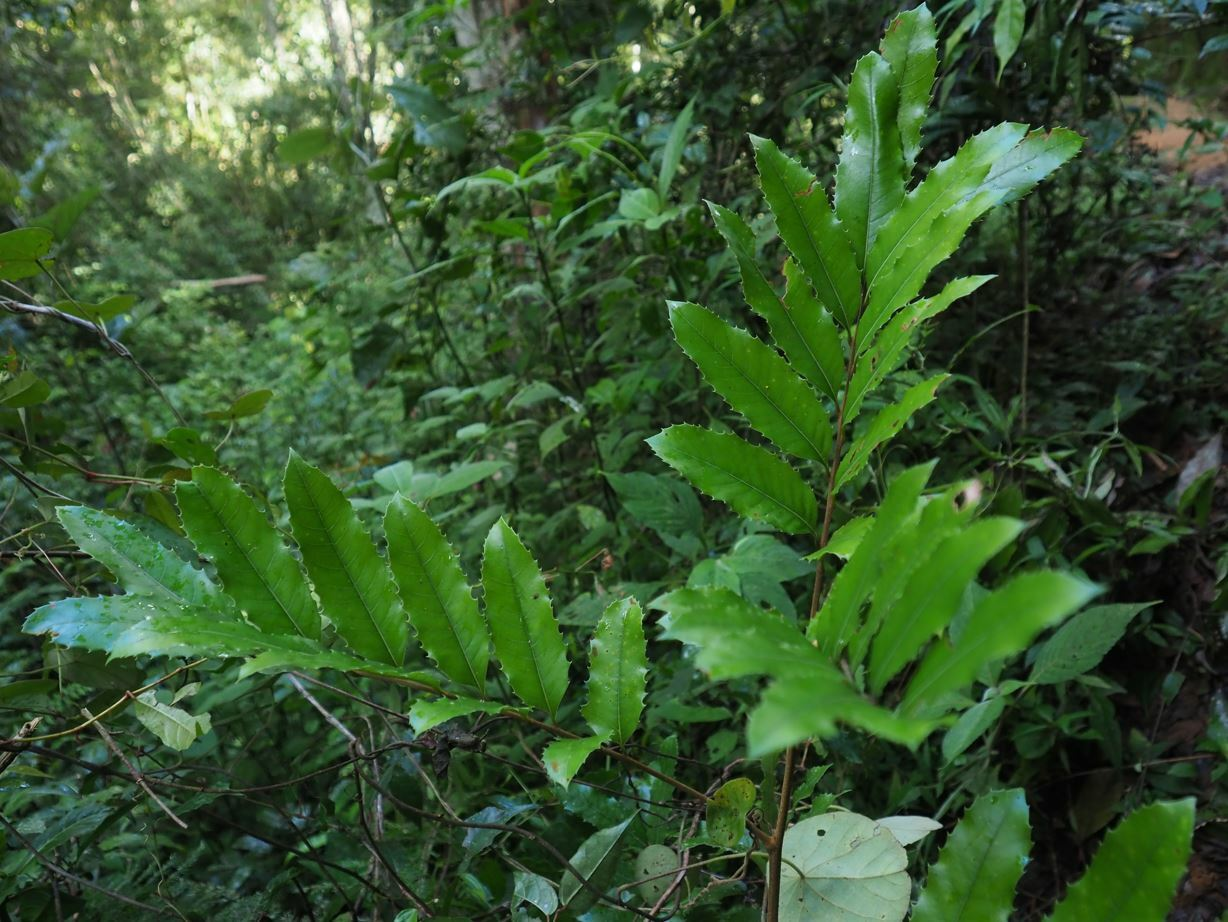
- Plagioscyphus stelechanthus

Scientific classification
- Kingdom: Plantae
- Clade: Tracheophytes
- Clade: Angiosperms
- Clade: Eudicots
- Clade: Rosids
- Order: Sapindales
- Family: Sapindaceae
- Genus: Plagioscyphus; Radlk.

Synonyms
- Cotylodiscus Radlk.; Poculodiscus Danguy & Choux; Strophiodiscus Choux

= Plagioscyphus =

Genus of plants

Plagioscyphus is a genus of flowering plants in the family Sapindaceae. Its native range is Madagascar.

As of November 2024, Plants of the World Online accepted these species:

- Plagioscyphus calciphilus Capuron
- Plagioscyphus cauliflorus Radlk.
- Plagioscyphus danguyanus Capuron
- Plagioscyphus humbertii Capuron
- Plagioscyphus jumellei (Choux) Capuron
- Plagioscyphus louvelii Danguy & Choux
- Plagioscyphus meridionalis Capuron
- Plagioscyphus stelechanthus (Radlk.) Capuron
- Plagioscyphus unijugatus Capuron
