= Camptolepis =

Scientific classification
- Kingdom: Plantae
- Clade: Tracheophytes
- Clade: Angiosperms
- Clade: Eudicots
- Clade: Rosids
- Order: Sapindales
- Family: Sapindaceae
- Subfamily: Sapindoideae
- Genus: Camptolepis; Radlk.

Genus of flowering plants

Camptolepis is a genus of plant in family Sapindaceae. It contains the following species (but this list may be incomplete):

- Camptolepis crassifolia Capuron
- Camptolepis grandiflora Capuron
- Camptolepis hygrophila Capuron
- Camptolepis ramiflora (Taub.) Radlk.
