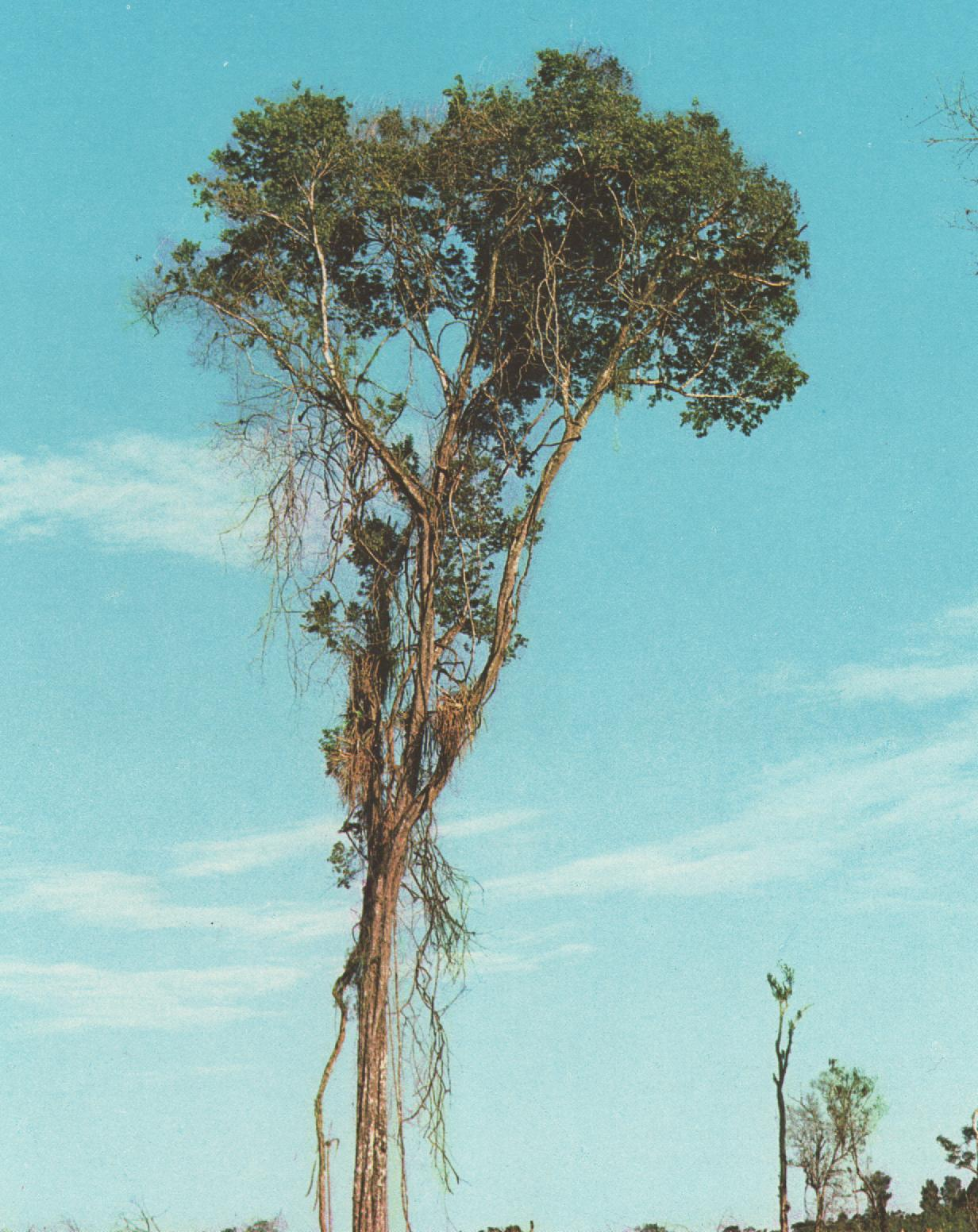
- Diatenopteryx sorbifolia

Scientific classification
- Kingdom: Plantae
- Clade: Tracheophytes
- Clade: Angiosperms
- Clade: Eudicots
- Clade: Rosids
- Order: Sapindales
- Family: Sapindaceae
- Genus: Diatenopteryx; Radlk.

= Diatenopteryx =

Genus of plants

Diatenopteryx is a genus of flowering plants belonging to the family Sapindaceae.

Its native range is Southeastern and Southern Brazil to Bolivia and Northeastern Argentina.

Species:

- Diatenopteryx grazielae Vaz & Andreata
- Diatenopteryx sorbifolia Radlk.
