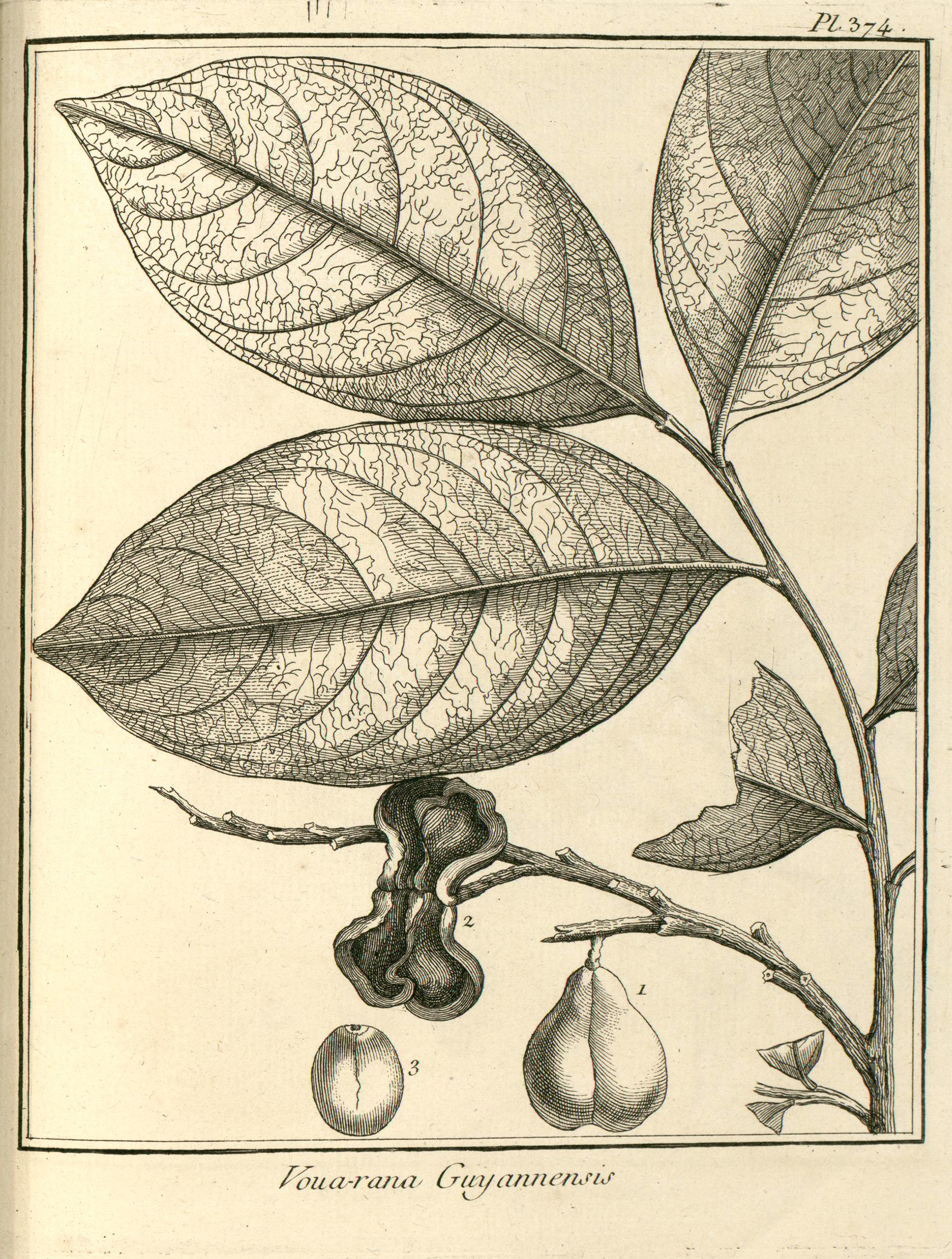
- Vouarana guianensis

Scientific classification
- Kingdom: Plantae
- Clade: Tracheophytes
- Clade: Angiosperms
- Clade: Eudicots
- Clade: Rosids
- Order: Sapindales
- Family: Sapindaceae
- Subfamily: Sapindoideae
- Tribe: Cupanieae
- Genus: Vouarana; Aubl.

Species
- See text

= Vouarana =

Genus of Sapindaceae plants

Vouarana is a genus of medium-sized trees of the soapberry subfamily Sapindoideae, native to tropical southern Central America and northern South America. It is closely related to the genus Cupania. As was his wont, Aublet named the genus after what the local people called the plants, a practice his contemporaries criticized as barbarous.

== Species ==
Species currently accepted by The Plant List are as follows:

- Vouarana anomala (Steyerm.) Acev.-Rodr.
- Vouarana guianensis Aubl.
