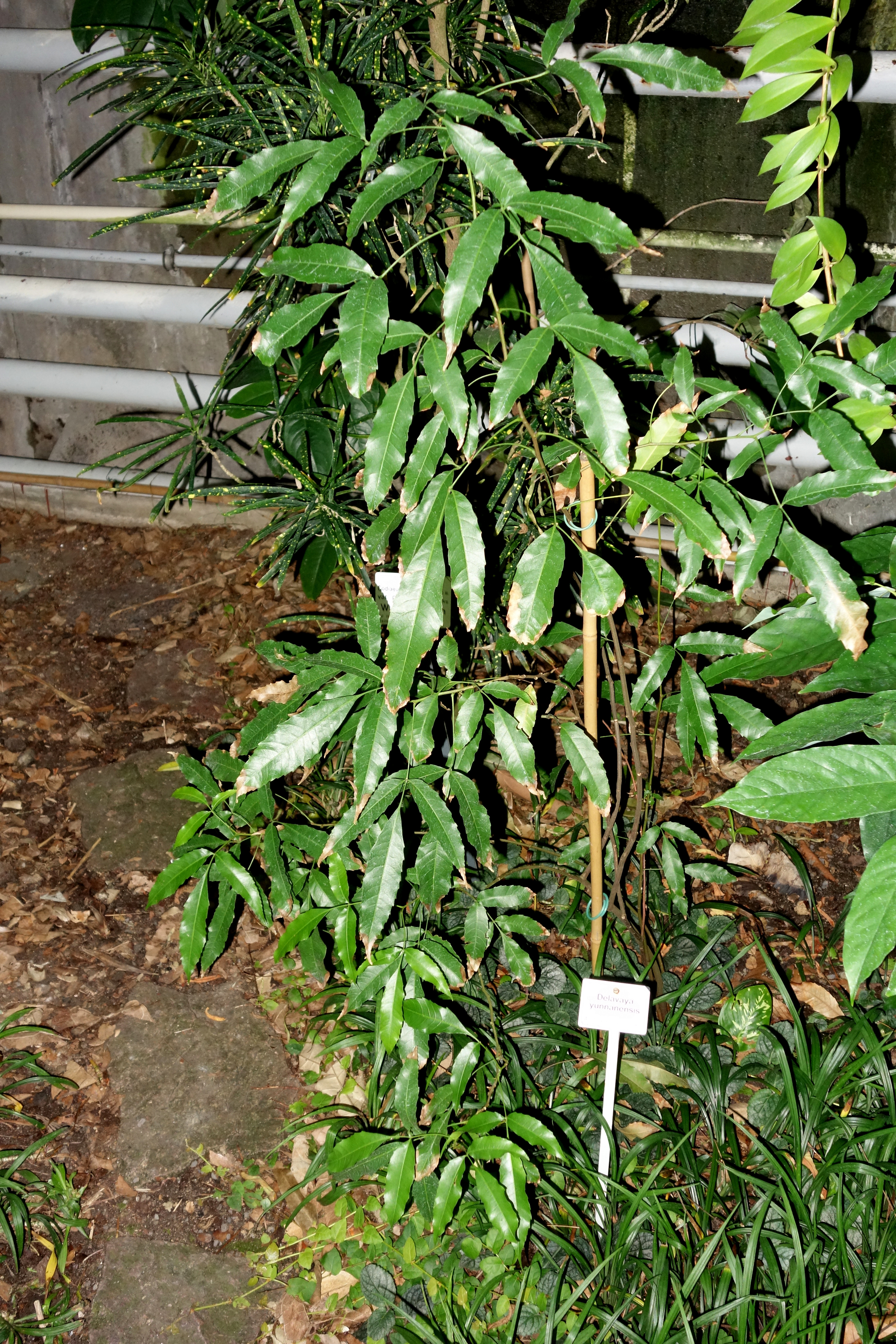
- Delavaya yunnanensis

Scientific classification
- Kingdom: Plantae
- Clade: Tracheophytes
- Clade: Angiosperms
- Clade: Eudicots
- Clade: Rosids
- Order: Sapindales
- Family: Sapindaceae
- Subfamily: Sapindoideae
- Genus: Delavaya; Franch.
- Species: D. yunnanensis

Binomial name
- Delavaya yunnanensis Franch.

= Delavaya =

Genus of flowering plants

Delavaya is a monotypic genus of shrub or small tree endemic to southwestern China and northern Vietnam. The sole species is Delavaya yunnanensis (syn. Delavaya toxocarpa).
