= Radlkoferotoma =

- Radlkoferotoma berroi in Uruguay

Scientific classification
- Kingdom: Plantae
- Clade: Tracheophytes
- Clade: Angiosperms
- Clade: Eudicots
- Clade: Asterids
- Order: Asterales
- Family: Asteraceae
- Subfamily: Asteroideae
- Tribe: Eupatorieae
- Genus: Radlkoferotoma; Kuntze

Synonyms
- Carelia Less. 1832, illegitimate homonym, not Fabr. 1759 nor Juss. ex Cav. 1803

Genus of plants

Radlkoferotoma is a genus of South American flowering plants in the family Asteraceae.

The genus name of Radlkoferotoma is in honour of Ludwig Adolph Timotheus Radlkofer (1829–1927), a Bavarian taxonomist and botanist. It was first described and published in Revis. Gen. Pl. Vol.1 on page 358 in 1891.

Species

- Radlkoferotoma berroi (Hutch.) R.M.King & H.Rob. - Uruguay, Rio Grande do Sul
- Radlkoferotoma cistifolia (Less.) Kuntze - Uruguay, Brazil
- Radlkoferotoma ramboi (Cabrera) R.M.King & H.Rob. - Rio Grande do Sul
