= Dictyoneura =

Scientific classification
- Kingdom: Plantae
- Clade: Tracheophytes
- Clade: Angiosperms
- Clade: Eudicots
- Clade: Rosids
- Order: Sapindales
- Family: Sapindaceae
- Tribe: Cupanieae
- Genus: Dictyoneura; Blume

Type species
- Dictyoneura acuminata Blume

Species
- See text

Genus of flowering plants

Dictyoneura is a genus of two-to-three species of rainforest trees known to science, constituting part of the plant family Sapindaceae.

They grow naturally in the rainforests of New Guinea, the Moluccas, Sulawesi, Borneo, the Philippines and Cape York Peninsula, far northern Queensland, Australia.

European science formally described the genus and the two known species in 1847, authored by botanist Carl Ludwig Blume.

J. van Dijk's genus review scientific paper and Flora Malesiana account described a different taxon of a single poor quality specimen of some broken parts of leaves collected in the Moluccas. As it is of so poor quality it is of uncertain status, either as a variant of D. acuminata having leaves wider than its usual 5 cm (2.0 in) or a different species; a decision requires more quality specimens.

== Species ==
- Dictyoneura acuminata Blume – Borneo, Philippines, Sulawesi, Moluccas, New Guinea
  - subsp. acuminata – Borneo, Philippines, Sulawesi, Moluccas, New Guinea
  - subsp. microcarpa Dijk – W. New Guinea
- Dictyoneura obtusa Blume – New Guinea, New Ireland, New Britain, Cape York Peninsula, Australia, its records of significant variation across New Guinea may turn out to lead to descriptions of new taxa
