= Radlkofera =

Scientific classification
- Kingdom: Plantae
- Clade: Tracheophytes
- Clade: Angiosperms
- Clade: Eudicots
- Clade: Rosids
- Order: Sapindales
- Family: Sapindaceae
- Tribe: Nephelieae
- Genus: Radlkofera; Gilg

Species of flowering plant

Radlkofera is a monotypic genus of flowering plants belonging to the family Sapindaceae. It only contains one known species, Radlkofera calodendron Gilg

Its native range is Tropical Africa. It is found in Cabinda, Cameroon, Central African Republic, Congo, Gabon and Zaïre.

The genus name of Radlkofera is in honour of Ludwig Adolph Timotheus Radlkofer (1829–1927), a Bavarian taxonomist and botanist. The Latin specific epithet of calodendron is derived from the Greek, kalos which means beautiful and dendrum means tree. Both the genus and the species were first described and published in Bot. Jahrb. Syst. Vol.24 on page 300 in 1897.
