= Molinaea =

Scientific classification
- Kingdom: Plantae
- Clade: Tracheophytes
- Clade: Angiosperms
- Clade: Eudicots
- Clade: Rosids
- Order: Sapindales
- Family: Sapindaceae
- Tribe: Cupanieae
- Genus: Molinaea; Comm. ex Juss.

Genus of flowering plant

Molinaea is a genus of flowering plants belonging to the family Sapindaceae.

Its native range is the Western Indian Ocean. It is found in Madagascar, Mauritius and Réunion.

The genus name of Molinaea is in honour of Jean Desmoulins, also called Johannes Molinaeus (1530–1622), French doctor and botanist, student of Jacques Daléchamps and Guillaume Rondelet. It was first described and published in Gen. Pl. on page 248 in 1789.

== Known species ==
According to Kew:

- Molinaea alternifolia Willd.
- Molinaea andronensis (Baker) Radlk. ex Choux
- Molinaea brevipes Radlk.
- Molinaea laevis Willd.
- Molinaea macrantha Radlk.
- Molinaea retusa Radlk.
- Molinaea sessilifolia Capuron
- Molinaea tolambitou (Cambess.) Radlk.
