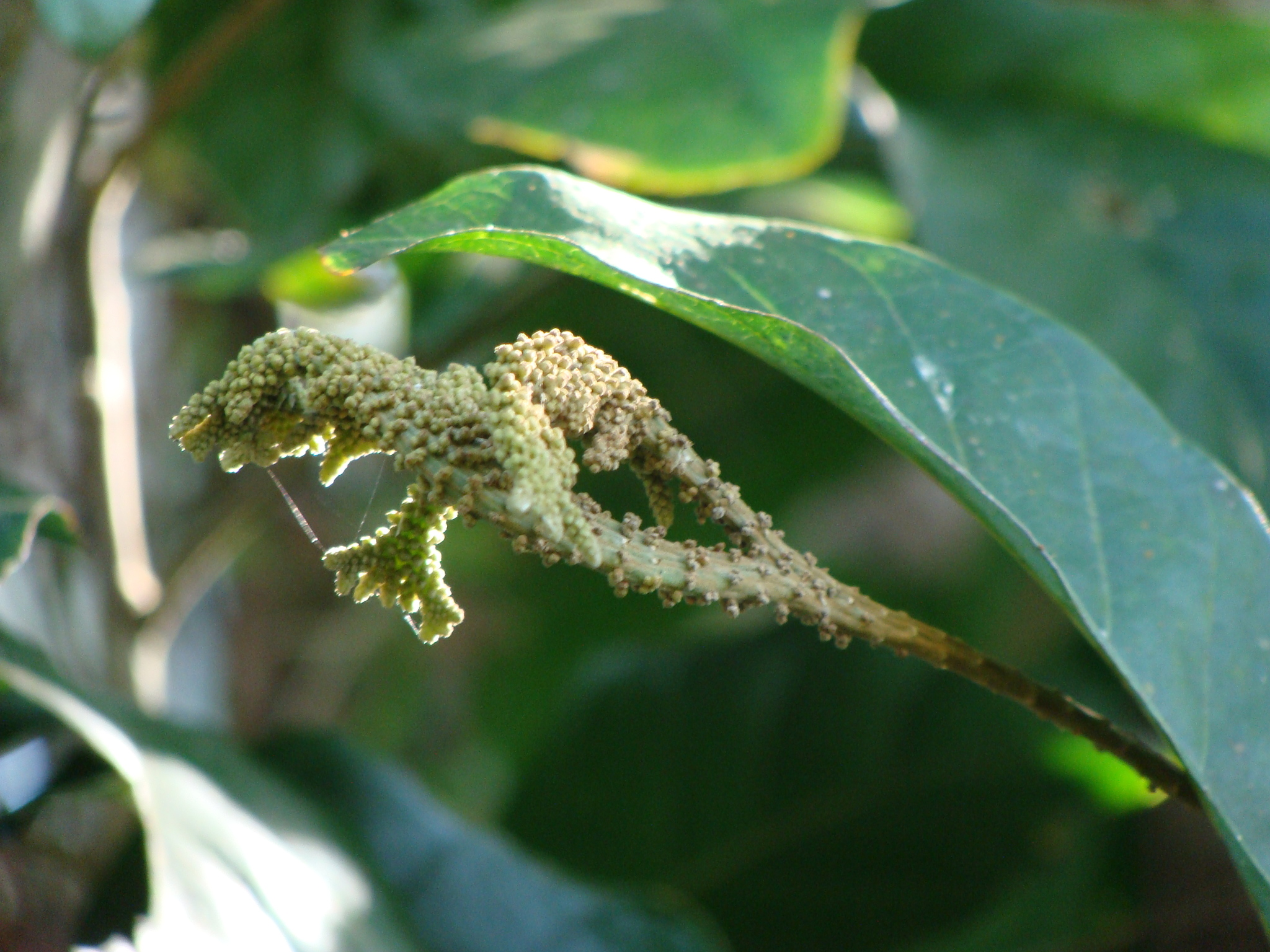
- Matayba clavelligera in Mexico

Scientific classification
- Kingdom: Plantae
- Clade: Tracheophytes
- Clade: Angiosperms
- Clade: Eudicots
- Clade: Rosids
- Order: Sapindales
- Family: Sapindaceae
- Tribe: Cupanieae
- Genus: Matayba; Aubl.

Synonyms
- Ernstingia Scop.; Gelonium Gaertn.; Lamprospermum Klotzsch; Lasianthemum Klotzsch; Monopteris Klotzsch; Ratonia DC.

= Matayba =

Genus of plants

Matayba is a genus of flowering plants in the family Sapindaceae. Its native range is Mexico and the Caribbean to Uruguay.

== Species ==
As of February 2025, Plants of the World Online accepts the following 49 species:

- Matayba adenanthera Radlk.
- Matayba apetala (Griseb.) Radlk.
- Matayba arborescens (Aubl.) Radlk.
- Matayba atropurpurea (Radlk.) Radlk.
- Matayba ayangannensis Acev.-Rodr.
- Matayba boliviana Radlk.
- Matayba camptoneura Radlk.
- Matayba clavelligera Radlk.
- Matayba cristae Reitz
- Matayba discolor Radlk.
- Matayba domingensis (DC.) Radlk.
- Matayba elaeagnoides Radlk.
- Matayba elegans Radlk.
- Matayba floribunda Radlk.
- Matayba glaberrima Radlk.
- Matayba grandis Radlk.
- Matayba guianensis Aubl.
- Matayba heterophylla (Mart.) Radlk.
- Matayba inelegans Radlk.
- Matayba ingifolia Standl.
- Matayba intermedia Radlk.
- Matayba juglandifolia (A.St.-Hil.) Radlk.
- Matayba kavanayena (Steyerm.) Steyerm.
- Matayba kennedyae Croat
- Matayba laevigata Radlk.
- Matayba leucodictya Radlk.
- Matayba livescens (Radlk.) R.L.G.Coelho, V.C.Souza & Ferrucci
- Matayba longipes Radlk.
- Matayba macrocarpa Gereau
- Matayba marginata Radlk.
- Matayba mexicana (Turcz.) Radlk.
- Matayba mollis Radlk.
- Matayba obovata R.L.G.Coelho, V.C.Souza & Ferrucci
- Matayba opaca Radlk.
- Matayba oppositifolia (A.Rich.) Britton
- Matayba pallens Radlk.
- Matayba paucijuga Radlk.
- Matayba peruviana Radlk.
- Matayba ptariana Steyerm.
- Matayba punctata (Cambess.) Radlk.
- Matayba purgans Radlk.
- Matayba robusta Radlk.
- Matayba scrobiculata Radlk.
- Matayba spruceana (Benth.) Radlk.
- Matayba stenodictya Radlk.
- Matayba sylvatica (Casar.) Radlk.
- Matayba talisioides Radlk.
- Matayba verapazensis (Lundell) Lundell
- Matayba yutajensis Steyerm.
