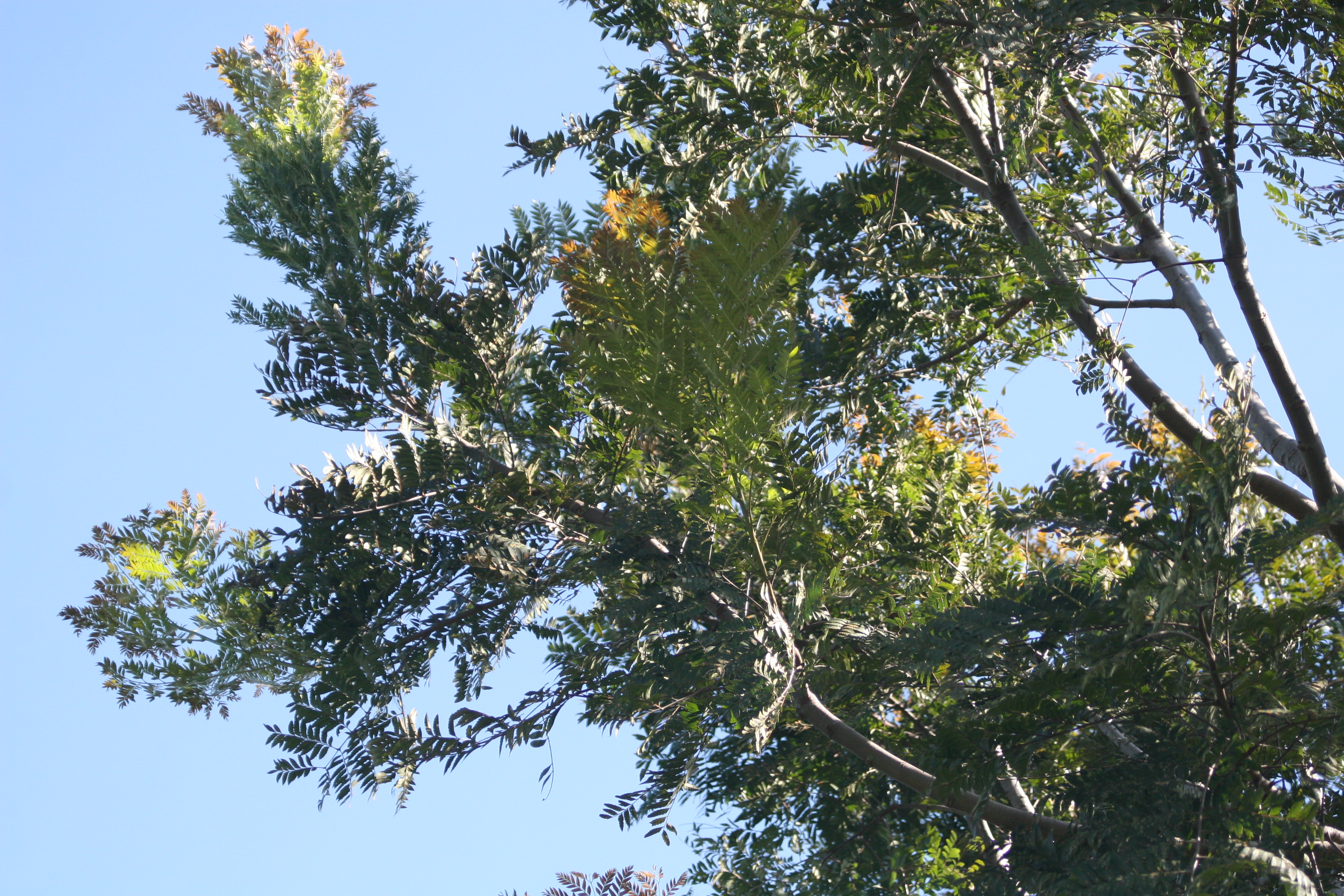
- Dilodendron costaricense

Scientific classification
- Kingdom: Plantae
- Clade: Tracheophytes
- Clade: Angiosperms
- Clade: Eudicots
- Clade: Rosids
- Order: Sapindales
- Family: Sapindaceae
- Genus: Dilodendron; Radlk.

= Dilodendron =

Genus of plants

Dilodendron is a genus of flowering plants belonging to the family Sapindaceae.

Its native range is Central and Southern Tropical America.

Species:

- Dilodendron bipinnatum Radlk.
- Dilodendron costaricense (Radlk.) A.H.Gentry & Steyerm.
- Dilodendron elegans (Radlk.) A.H.Gentry & Steyerm.
