= Gereaua =

Conservation status
- Least Concern (IUCN 3.1)

Scientific classification
- Kingdom: Plantae
- Clade: Tracheophytes
- Clade: Angiosperms
- Clade: Eudicots
- Clade: Rosids
- Order: Sapindales
- Family: Sapindaceae
- Subfamily: Sapindoideae
- Genus: Gereaua; Buerki & Callm.
- Species: G. perrieri

Binomial name
- Gereaua perrieri (Capuron) Buerki & Callm.

Synonyms
- Haplocoelum perrieri Capuron

Genus of flowering plants

Gereaua is a monotypic genus of flowering plants belonging to the family Sapindaceae. It only contains one species, Gereaua perrieri.

Its native range is Madagascar.

== Description ==
Gereaua perrieri is a small or medium-sized tree which grows up to 10 meters tall.

== Range and habitat ==
Gereaua perrieri is native to northern and eastern Madagascar, where it is found in Diana, Sava, Analanjirofo, Alaotra-Mangoro, Analamanga, Haute- Matsiatra, Vatovavy-Fitovinany, Atsimo-Atsinanana, and Anosy regions.

It grows in humid lowland forests, littoral forests, and subhumid and montane forests. It is typically found on lateritic and sandy soils from 25 to 1356 meters elevation.

There are known 19 subpopulations of the species. It has an estimated extent of occurrence (EOO) of 165,756 km^{2}. The species is subject to habitat loss from shifting cultivation, and its population is thought to be decreasing. There is little information on the species' population size, but it is not considered threatened. Its conservation status is assessed as least concern.

== Naming ==
The genus name is in honour of Roy Emile Gereau (b. 1947), an American botanist and explorer. The specific Latin epithet of perrieri is in honour of Joseph Marie Henry Alfred Perrier de la Bâthie (1873–1958), a French botanist who studied Madagascan plants.

It was first described and published in Syst. Bot. Vol.35 on page 178 in 2010.
