= Cnesmocarpon =

Scientific classification
- Kingdom: Plantae
- Clade: Tracheophytes
- Clade: Angiosperms
- Clade: Eudicots
- Clade: Rosids
- Order: Sapindales
- Family: Sapindaceae
- Tribe: Cupanieae
- Genus: Cnesmocarpon; Adema

Type species
- Guioa dasyantha Radlk. – a synonym of: Cnesmocarpon dasyantha (Radlk.) Adema

Species
- See text

Genus of flowering plants

Cnesmocarpon is a genus of 4 species of rainforest trees known to science, constituting part of the plant family Sapindaceae.

They grow naturally in the rainforests of New Guinea and north eastern Queensland, Australia.

== Species ==
- Cnesmocarpon dasyantha (Radlk.) Adema, Pink tamarind – Australia, New Guinea

Synonyms: basionym: Guioa dasyantha Radlk.; Jagera dasyantha (Radlk.) S.T.Reynolds; Jagera discolor S.T.Reynolds

- Cnesmocarpon dentata Adema, – New Guinea
- Cnesmocarpon discoloroides Adema, – New Guinea
- Cnesmocarpon montana Adema, – New Guinea
