= Tina (plant) =

Scientific classification
- Kingdom: Plantae
- Clade: Tracheophytes
- Clade: Angiosperms
- Clade: Eudicots
- Clade: Rosids
- Order: Sapindales
- Family: Sapindaceae
- Tribe: Cupanieae
- Genus: Tina; Schult. (1819), nom. cons.

Species
- 19; see text

Synonyms
- Bemarivea Choux (1925); Neotina Capuron (1969); Tinopsis Radlk. (1888)

Genus of trees

Tina is a genus of tropical trees in the family Sapindaceae, native to the eastern coast of Madagascar.

== Species ==
19 species are accepted.

- Tina antongiliensis (Capuron) Callm. & Buerki
- Tina apiculata (Radlk.) Radlk. ex Choux
- Tina chapelieriana (Cambess.) Kalkman
- Tina chrysophylla (Capuron) Callm. & Buerki
- Tina conjugata Thouars ex Radlk.
- Tina coursii (Capuron) Callm. & Buerki
- Tina dasycarpa Radlk.
- Tina dissitiflora (Baker) Callm. & Buerki
- Tina fulvinervis Radlk.
- Tina isaloensis Drake
- Tina isoneura Radlk.
- Tina macrocarpa (Capuron) Callm. & Buerki
- Tina phellocarpa (Capuron) Callm. & Buerki
- Tina striata Radlk.
- Tina suarezensis (Capuron) Callm. & Buerki
- Tina tamatavensis (Capuron) Callm. & Buerki
- Tina thouarsiana (Cambess.) Capuron
- Tina urschii (Capuron) Callm. & Buerki
- Tina vadonii (Capuron) Callm. & Buerki
