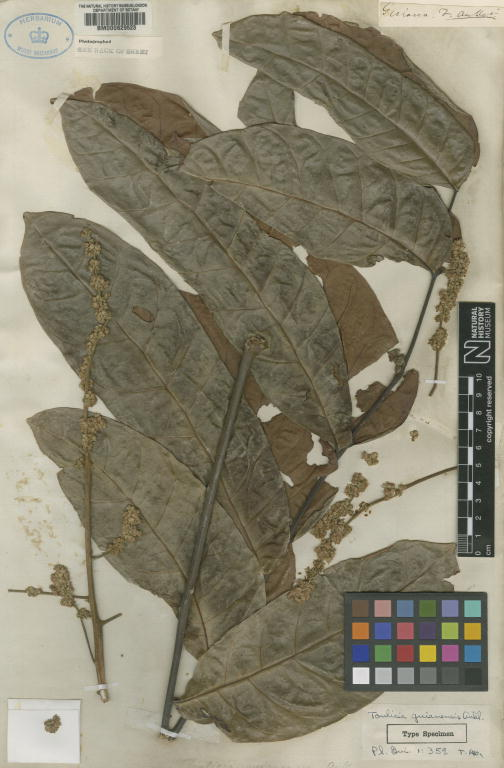
- Toulicia guianensis Aubl

Scientific classification
- Kingdom: Plantae
- Clade: Tracheophytes
- Clade: Angiosperms
- Clade: Eudicots
- Clade: Rosids
- Order: Sapindales
- Family: Sapindaceae
- Subfamily: Sapindoideae
- Genus: Toulicia; Aubl.

= Toulicia =

Genus of flowering plants

Toulicia is a genus of flowering plants belonging to the family Sapindaceae.

Its native range is South America.

Species:

- Toulicia bullata Radlk.
- Toulicia crassifolia Radlk.
