= Sisyrolepis =

Scientific classification
- Kingdom: Plantae
- Clade: Tracheophytes
- Clade: Angiosperms
- Clade: Eudicots
- Clade: Rosids
- Order: Sapindales
- Family: Sapindaceae
- Genus: Sisyrolepis; Radlk.

Genus of plants

Sisyrolepis is a genus of flowering plants belonging to the family Sapindaceae.

Its native range is Indo-China to Malaysian Peninsula.

Species:

- Sisyrolepis muricata (Pierre) Leenh.
