= Aporrhiza =

Scientific classification
- Kingdom: Plantae
- Clade: Tracheophytes
- Clade: Angiosperms
- Clade: Eudicots
- Clade: Rosids
- Order: Sapindales
- Family: Sapindaceae
- Subfamily: Sapindoideae
- Tribe: Nephelieae
- Genus: Aporrhiza; Radlk.

Genus of flowering plants

Aporrhiza is a genus of flowering plants belonging to the family Sapindaceae.

Its native range is Tropical Africa.

Species:

- Aporrhiza lastoursvillensis Pellegr.
- Aporrhiza letestui Pellegr.
- Aporrhiza multijuga Gilg
- Aporrhiza paniculata Radlk.
- Aporrhiza talbotii Baker f.
- Aporrhiza tessmannii Gilg ex Radlk.
- Aporrhiza urophylla Gilg
