= Pseudopteris =

Scientific classification
- Kingdom: Plantae
- Clade: Tracheophytes
- Clade: Angiosperms
- Clade: Eudicots
- Clade: Rosids
- Order: Sapindales
- Family: Sapindaceae
- Genus: Pseudopteris; Baill.

Genus of plants

Pseudopteris is a genus of flowering plants in the family Sapindaceae, native to Madagascar, whose species include:

- Pseudopteris ankaranensis Capuron
- Pseudopteris arborea Capuron
- Pseudopteris decipiens Baill.
