= Haplocoelopsis =

Conservation status
- Least Concern (IUCN 3.1)

Scientific classification
- Kingdom: Plantae
- Clade: Embryophytes
- Clade: Tracheophytes
- Clade: Spermatophytes
- Clade: Angiosperms
- Clade: Eudicots
- Clade: Rosids
- Order: Sapindales
- Family: Sapindaceae
- Tribe: Nephelieae
- Genus: Haplocoelopsis; F.G.Davies
- Species: H. africana

Binomial name
- Haplocoelopsis africana F.G.Davies

Genus of flowering plants

Haplocoelopsis is a monotypic plant genus in the family Sapindaceae. The sole species is Haplocoelopsis africana. It is a shrub or small tree native to southeastern Kenya, eastern Tanzania, and Angola, where it grows in moist lowland semi-deciduous tropical forest below 900 metres elevation.

Both the genus and species were described by Frances G. Davies in 1997.
