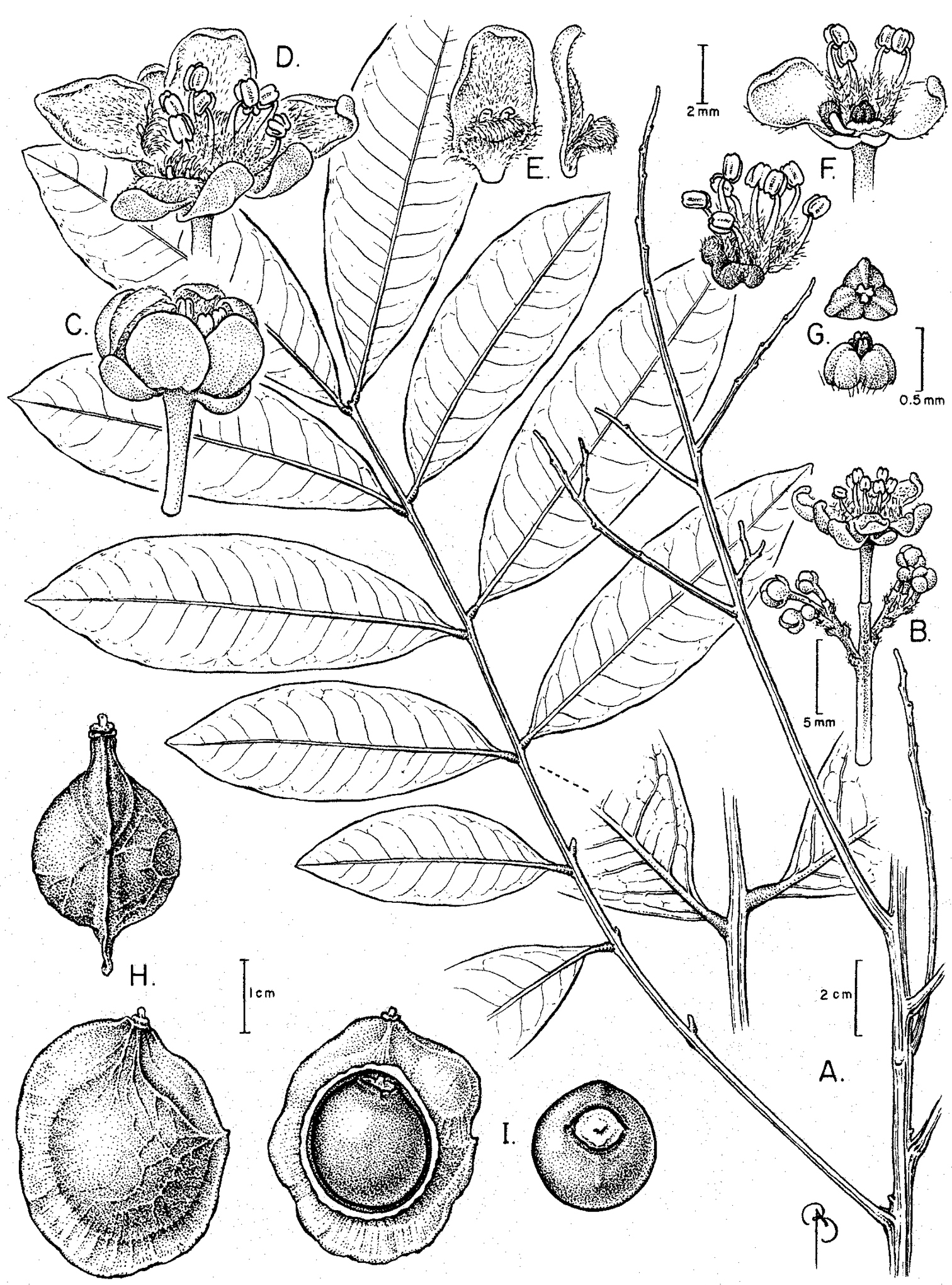

Scientific classification
- Kingdom: Plantae
- Clade: Tracheophytes
- Clade: Angiosperms
- Clade: Eudicots
- Clade: Rosids
- Order: Sapindales
- Family: Sapindaceae
- Genus: Alatococcus
- Species: A. siqueirae

Binomial name
- Alatococcus siqueirae Acev.-Rodr.

= Alatococcus =

Genus of flowering plants

Alatococcus is a genus of flowering plants belonging to the family Sapindaceae. It was first described in 2012.

Its native range is Espírito Santo in southeastern Brazil.

There is only one known species, Alatococcus siqueirae Acev.-Rodr.
