= Chouxia =

Scientific classification
- Kingdom: Plantae
- Clade: Tracheophytes
- Clade: Angiosperms
- Clade: Eudicots
- Clade: Rosids
- Order: Sapindales
- Family: Sapindaceae
- Genus: Chouxia; Capuron

Genus of flowering plants

Chouxia is a genus of flowering plants belonging to the family Sapindaceae.

Its native range is Madagascar.

Species:

- Chouxia bijugata G.E.Schatz, Gereau & Lowry
- Chouxia borealis G.E.Schatz, Gereau & Lowry
- Chouxia macrophylla G.E.Schatz, Gereau & Lowry
- Chouxia mollis G.E.Schatz, Gereau & Lowry
- Chouxia saboureaui Capuron ex G.E.Schatz, Gereau & Lowry
- Chouxia sorindeioides Capuron
