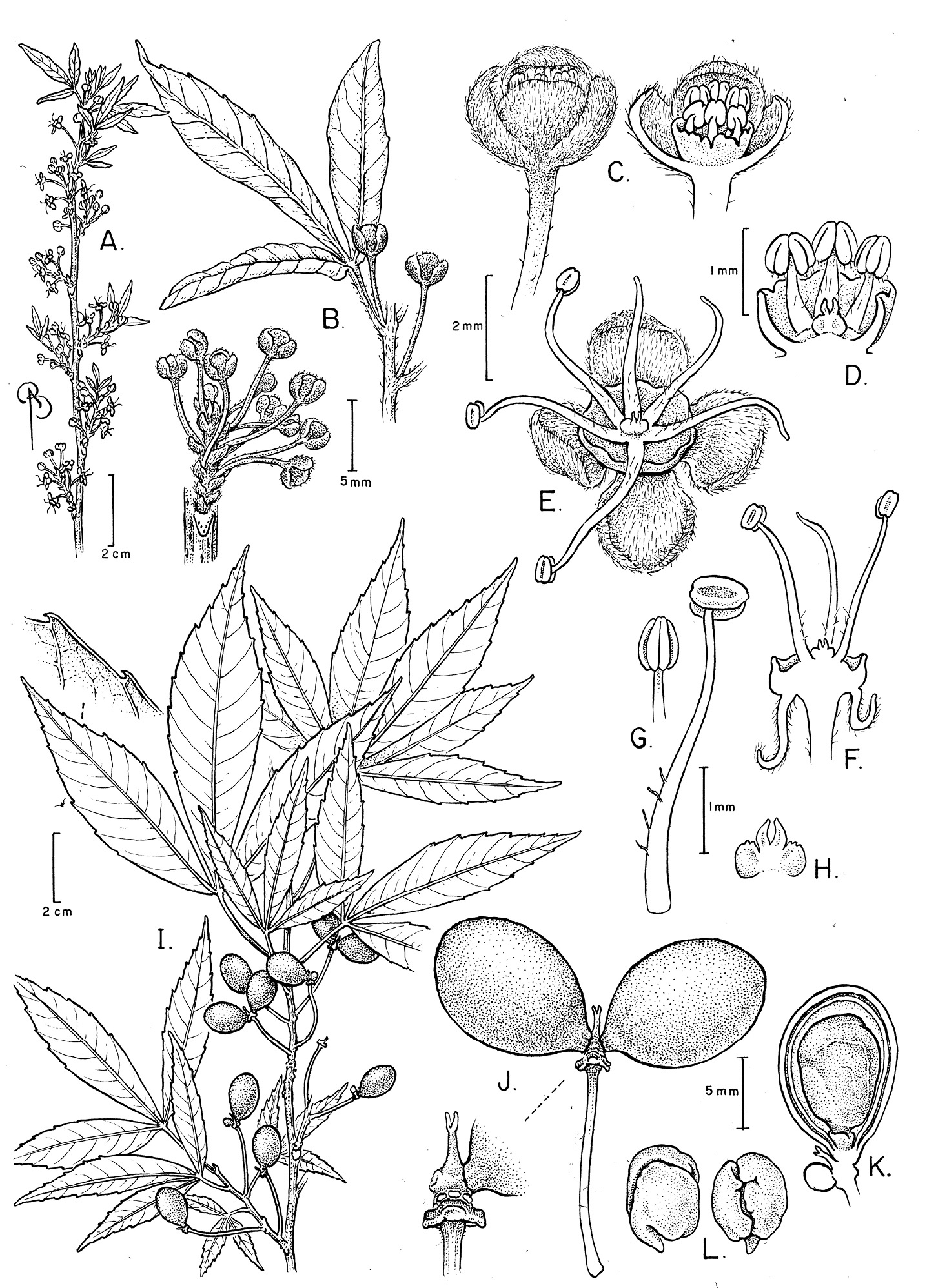
- An illustration of the leaf and flowering parts of A. frutescens

Scientific classification
- Kingdom: Plantae
- Clade: Tracheophytes
- Clade: Angiosperms
- Clade: Eudicots
- Clade: Rosids
- Order: Sapindales
- Family: Sapindaceae
- Genus: Allophylastrum; Acev.-Rodr.

= Allophylastrum =

Genus of flowering plants

Allophylastrum is a genus of flowering plants belonging to the family Sapindaceae.

Its native range is Guyana to Northern Brazil.

Species:

- Allophylastrum frutescens Acev.-Rodr.
