= Lophostigma (plant) =

Scientific classification
- Kingdom: Plantae
- Clade: Tracheophytes
- Clade: Angiosperms
- Clade: Eudicots
- Clade: Rosids
- Order: Sapindales
- Family: Sapindaceae
- Genus: Lophostigma; Radlk.

Genus of plants

Lophostigma is a genus of flowering plants belonging to the family Sapindaceae.

Its native range is Western South America.

Species:

- Lophostigma plumosum Radlk.
- Lophostigma schunkei (Acev.-Rodr.) Acev.-Rodr.
