= Blighiopsis =

Scientific classification
- Kingdom: Plantae
- Clade: Tracheophytes
- Clade: Angiosperms
- Clade: Eudicots
- Clade: Rosids
- Order: Sapindales
- Family: Sapindaceae
- Genus: Blighiopsis; Van der Veken

Genus of flowering plants

Blighiopsis is a genus of flowering plants belonging to the family Sapindaceae.

Its native range is Western Central Tropical Africa.

Species:

- Blighiopsis gabonica (Breteler) H.C.Hopkins
- Blighiopsis pseudostipularis Van der Veken
