= Eriocoelum =

Scientific classification
- Kingdom: Plantae
- Clade: Tracheophytes
- Clade: Angiosperms
- Clade: Eudicots
- Clade: Rosids
- Order: Sapindales
- Family: Sapindaceae
- Genus: Eriocoelum; Hook.f.

Genus of plants

Eriocoelum is a genus of flowering plants belonging to the family Sapindaceae.

Its native range is Tropical Africa.

Species:

- Eriocoelum dzangensis D.J.Harris & Wortley
- Eriocoelum kerstingii Gilg ex Engl.
- Eriocoelum lawtonii Exell
- Eriocoelum macrocarpum Gilg ex Radlk.
- Eriocoelum microspermum Radlk. ex Engl.
- Eriocoelum oblongum Keay
- Eriocoelum paniculatum Baker
- Eriocoelum petiolare Radlk. ex Engl.
- Eriocoelum pungens Radlk. ex Engl.
- Eriocoelum racemosum Baker
- Eriocoelum rivulare Exell
