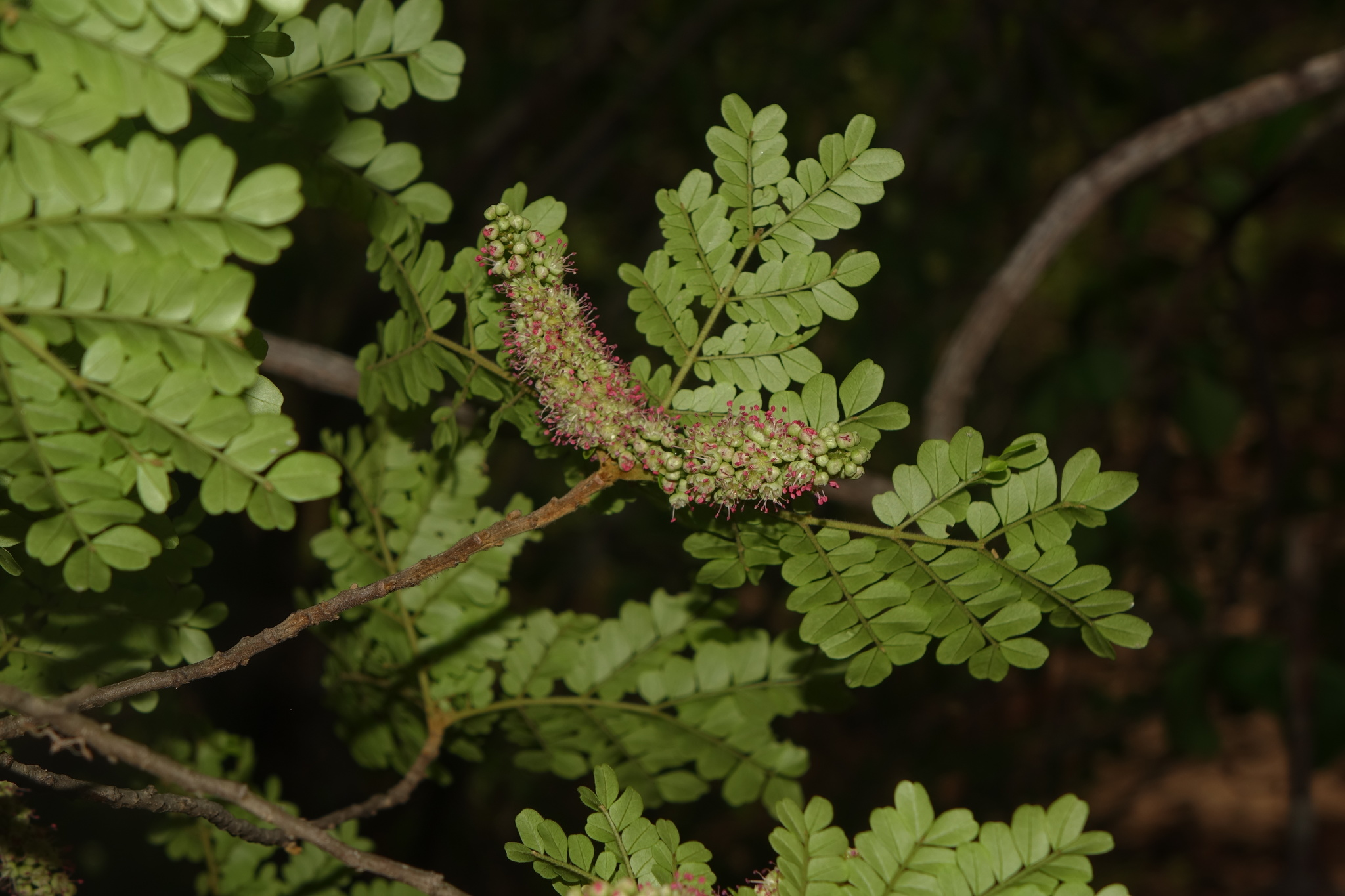
- Macphersonia gracilis in Madagascar

Scientific classification
- Kingdom: Plantae
- Clade: Tracheophytes
- Clade: Angiosperms
- Clade: Eudicots
- Clade: Rosids
- Order: Sapindales
- Family: Sapindaceae
- Genus: Macphersonia; Blume

= Macphersonia =

Genus of plants

Macphersonia is a genus of flowering plants belonging to the family Sapindaceae.

Its native range is Kenya to Mozambique and islands of the western Indian Ocean.

Species:

- Macphersonia cauliflora Radlk.
- Macphersonia chapelieri (Baill.) Capuron
- Macphersonia gracilis O.Hoffm.
- Macphersonia macrocarpa Choux
- Macphersonia madagascariensis Blume
- Macphersonia radlkoferi Choux
