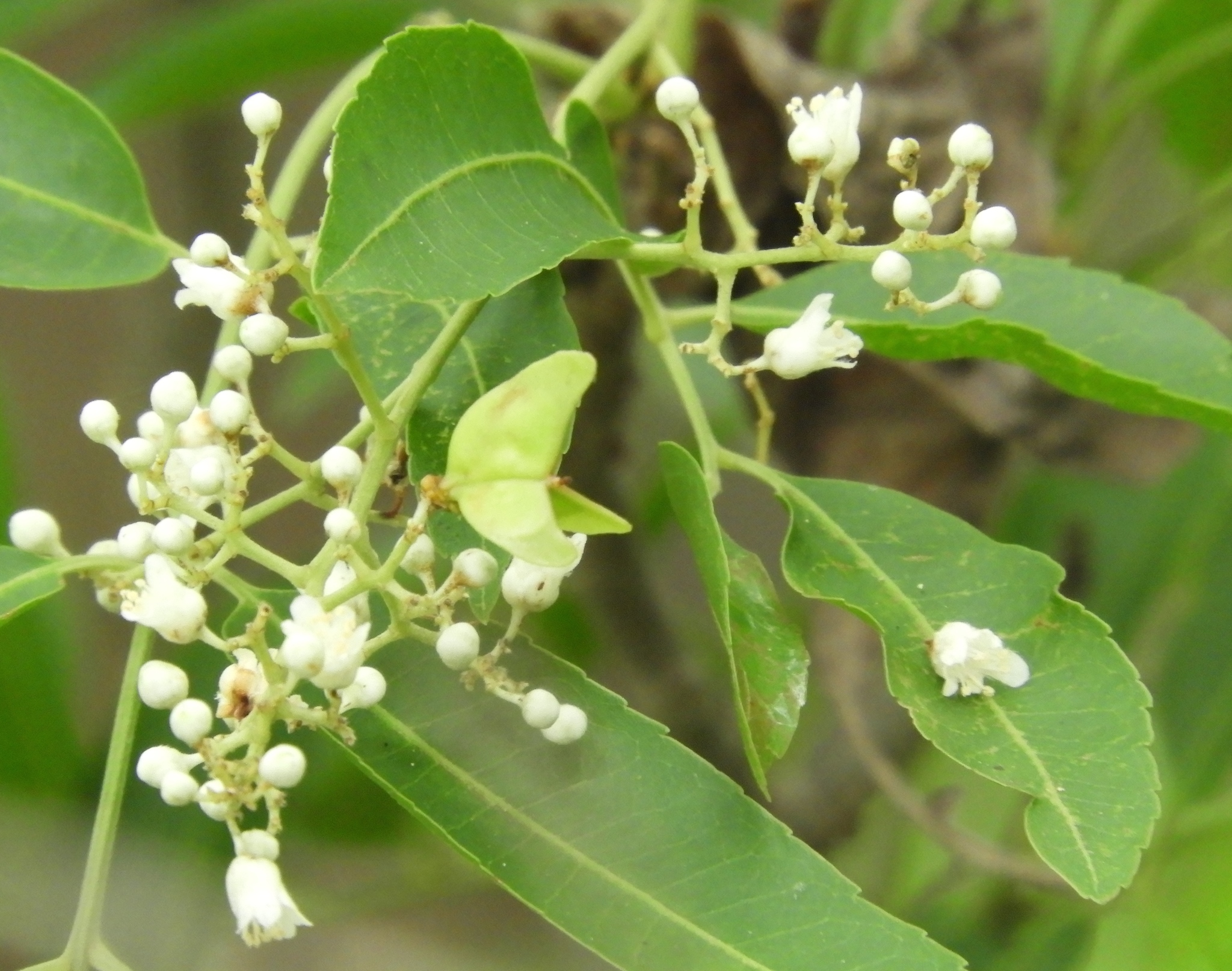
- Thouinidium decandrum in Mexico

Scientific classification
- Kingdom: Plantae
- Clade: Tracheophytes
- Clade: Angiosperms
- Clade: Eudicots
- Clade: Rosids
- Order: Sapindales
- Family: Sapindaceae
- Genus: Thouinidium; Radlk.

= Thouinidium =

Genus of flowering plants

Thouinidium is a genus of flowering plants belonging to the family Sapindaceae.

== Distribution and habitat ==
The native range of species in the genus is from Mexico to Central America, as well as in the Caribbean in Cuba and Hispaniola (the Dominican Republic and Haiti).

== Taxonomy ==
The genus name of Thouinidium is in honour of André Thouin (1747–1824), a French botanist. The species were originally thought to be a part of Thouinia, a related genus with the same etymology. It was first described and published in Sitzungsber. Math.-Phys. Cl. Königl. Bayer. Akad. Wiss. München Vol.8 on page 267 in 1878.

=== Known species ===
As accepted by Kew:

- Thouinidium cyrilli-nelsonii J.Linares
- Thouinidium decandrum (Bonpl.) Radlk.
- Thouinidium inaequilaterum Alain
- Thouinidium insigne (Brandegee) Radlk.
- Thouinidium oblongum Radlk.
- Thouinidium pinnatum (Turpin) Radlk.
- Thouinidium pulverulentum (Griseb.) Radlk.
