= Beguea =

Scientific classification
- Kingdom: Plantae
- Clade: Tracheophytes
- Clade: Angiosperms
- Clade: Eudicots
- Clade: Rosids
- Order: Sapindales
- Family: Sapindaceae
- Genus: Beguea; Capuron

Genus of flowering plants

Beguea is a genus of flowering plants belonging to the family Sapindaceae.

Its native range is Madagascar.

Species:

- Beguea ankeranensis G.E.Schatz & Lowry
- Beguea apetala Capuron
- Beguea australis G.E.Schatz, Gereau & Lowry
- Beguea betamponensis G.E.Schatz, Gereau & Lowry
- Beguea birkinshawii G.E.Schatz, Gereau & Lowry
- Beguea borealis G.E.Schatz & Lowry
- Beguea galokensis G.E.Schatz & Lowry
- Beguea tsaratananensis G.E.Schatz, Gereau & Lowry
- Beguea turkii G.E.Schatz, Gereau & Lowry
- Beguea vulgaris G.E.Schatz, Gereau & Lowry
