= Tripterodendron =

Scientific classification
- Kingdom: Plantae
- Clade: Tracheophytes
- Clade: Angiosperms
- Clade: Eudicots
- Clade: Rosids
- Order: Sapindales
- Family: Sapindaceae
- Genus: Tripterodendron; Radlk.

Genus of flowering plants

Tripterodendron is a genus of flowering plants belonging to the family Sapindaceae.

Its native range is Southeastern Brazil.

Species:

- Tripterodendron filicifolium Radlk.
