= Tsingya =

Scientific classification
- Kingdom: Plantae
- Clade: Tracheophytes
- Clade: Angiosperms
- Clade: Eudicots
- Clade: Rosids
- Order: Sapindales
- Family: Sapindaceae
- Genus: Tsingya; Capuron

Genus of flowering plants

Tsingya is a genus of flowering plants belonging to the family Sapindaceae.

Its native range is Madagascar.

Species:

- Tsingya bemarana Capuron
