= Hornea mauritiana =

Scientific classification
- Kingdom: Plantae
- Clade: Tracheophytes
- Clade: Angiosperms
- Clade: Eudicots
- Clade: Rosids
- Order: Sapindales
- Family: Sapindaceae
- Subfamily: Sapindoideae
- Genus: Hornea; Baker
- Species: H. mauritiana

Binomial name
- Hornea mauritiana Baker

Synonyms
- Thouinia mauritiana Bojer

Species of plant

Hornea is a monotypic genus of flowering plants belonging to the family Sapindaceae. The only species is Hornea mauritiana.

It is native to Mauritius.

The genus name of Hornea is in honour of John Horne (1835–1905), a Scottish botanist, and the Latin specific epithet of mauritiana means coming from Mauritius. Both the species and the genus were first described and published in Fl. Mauritius on page 59 in 1877.
