= Tristira (plant) =

Scientific classification
- Kingdom: Plantae
- Clade: Tracheophytes
- Clade: Angiosperms
- Clade: Eudicots
- Clade: Rosids
- Order: Sapindales
- Family: Sapindaceae
- Subfamily: Sapindoideae
- Genus: Tristira; Radlk.

Genus of flowering plants

Tristira is a genus of flowering plants belonging to the family Sapindaceae.

Its native range is Philippines, Sulawesi and Maluku.

Species:

- Tristira triptera (Blanco) Radlk.
