= Charles Konig =

German naturalist (1774–1851)

Charles Dietrich Eberhard Konig KH
- Born: 1774; Brunswick
- Died: 6 September 1851 (aged 77); London
- Other names: Karl Dietrich Eberhard König, KH
- Education: Göttingen
- Known for: Icones fossilium sectiles (1820–1825)
- Scientific career
- Fields: Botany, geology, mineralogy
- Institutions: Department of natural history of the British Museum
- Author abbrev. (botany): K.D.Koenig

Charles Dietrich Eberhard Konig or Karl Dietrich Eberhard König, KH (1774 – 6 September 1851) was a German naturalist.

He was born in Brunswick and educated at Göttingen. He came to England at the end of 1800 to organize the collections of Queen Charlotte. On the completion of this work he became assistant to Dryander, librarian to Joseph Banks. In 1807, he succeeded George Shaw as assistant keeper of the department of natural history in the British Museum. On the death of his superior in 1813, he took his place as keeper.

He later became keeper of geology and mineralogy, and turned his attention to minerals and fossils, arranging the recently acquired collection of Mr. Greville. He retained the post until his sudden death in London in 1851.

Konig anglicized his name upon his appointment as assistant keeper in 1807. In 1837, following a House of Commons Select committee report on the British Museum, the Department of Natural History was divided into three branches, with Konig being put in charge of the Mineralogical and Geological branch.

Besides writing various papers for journals, Konig was associated with John Sims in the issue of Annals of Botany from 1805 to 1807. He described many fossils in the British Museum in a classic work entitled Icones fossilium sectiles (1820–1825).
