= Ludwig Adolph Timotheus Radlkofer =

Bavarian taxonomist and botanist

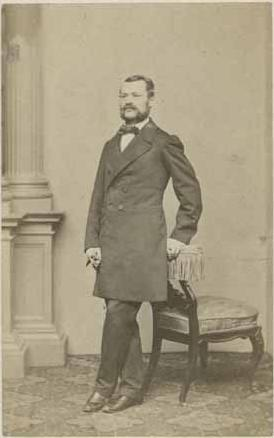
Ludwig Adolph Timotheus Radlkofer

Ludwig Adolph Timotheus Radlkofer (19 December 1829, in Munich – 16 February 1927, in Munich) was a Bavarian taxonomist and botanist.

Radlkofer became a physician in 1854 and earned a PhD in botany at Jena the following year. He became an associate professor of botany at the Ludwig-Maximilians-Universität München in 1859 as well as deputy director of the Nymphenburg Palace botanical garden and herbarium. In 1892, he was named director of the Botanical Museum. He was made emeritus professor in 1913 and died in 1927 in the same room in which he was born.

Radlkofer's main work was on the family Sapindaceae. His collections, sent by botanists from all over the world, are housed in Munich.

The South African flower Greyia radlkoferi is named for him, as are the South American-based genera of Radlkoferotoma, and Radlkofera, a monotypic genus of flowering plants from Africa belonging to the family Sapindaceae.

The former genus Radlkoferella (a wastebasket genus) is now called Pouteria.

The standard author abbreviation Radlk. is used to indicate this person as the author when citing a botanical name.

== Published works ==
Among his numerous written works are treatises published in English, such as:

- "Three new species of Sapindaceae from western Mexico and Lower California", (1895).
- "New and noteworthy Hawaiian plants", (1911).
- "New Sapindaceae from Panama and Costa Rica", (1914).

His other principal works include:

- Die Befruchtung der Phanerogamen. Ein Beitrag zur Entscheidung des darüber bestehenden Streites, (1856).
- Der Befruchtungsprocess im Pflanzenreiche und sein Verhältniss zu dem im Thierreiche, (1857).
- Ergänzungen zur Monographie der Sapindaceen-Gattung Serjania, (1875).
- Ueber die Sapindaceen Holländisch-Indiens, (1877).
- Sapindaceae (issued in eight parts 1931–1934); In: Engler's Das Pflanzenreich.
