= List of Sapindaceae genera =

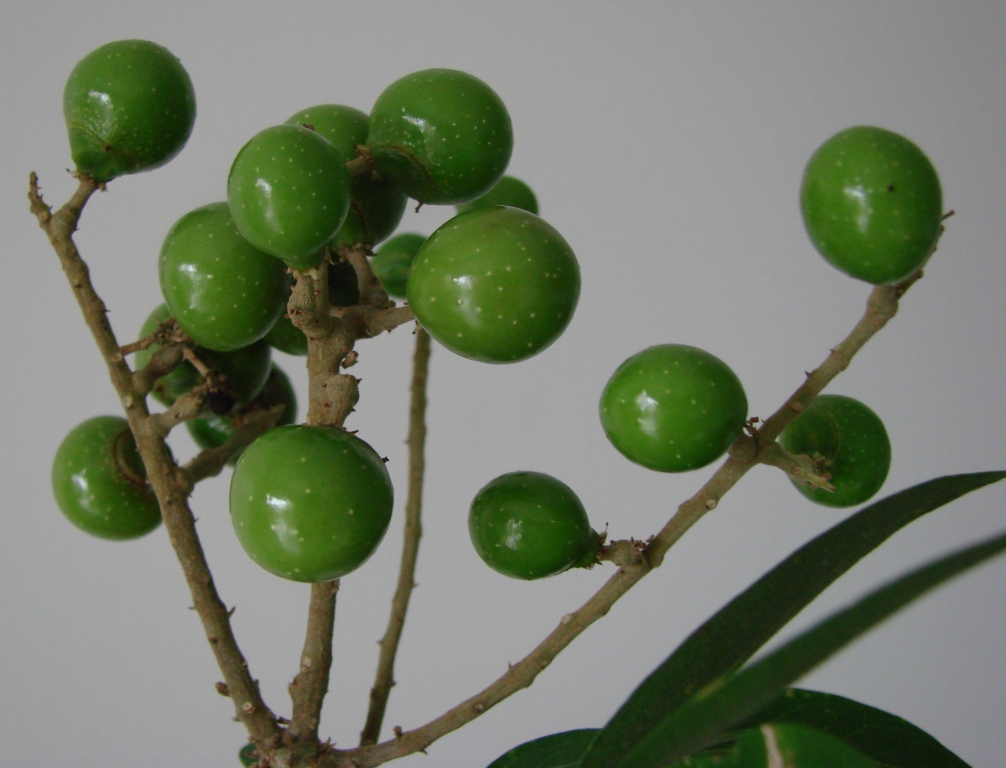
The fruits of Sapindus saponaria, western or wingleaf soapberry, give the family its vernacular name.

This is a list of genera in the soapberry family, Sapindaceae, which includes the soapberries (Sapindus), maples (Acer), and paullinias, amongst others. As currently circumscribed, the family contains approximatively 1900 species into over 140 genera classified into 4 subfamilies.

== Phylogeny and circumscription ==
The circumscription of Sapindaceae encompasses the former Aceraceae and Hippocastanaceae families as tribes in subfamily Hippocastanoideae. Although the classification at subfamilial level is fairly well-established, the circumscription at tribal and generic level remains only partially resolved, especially in the larger subfamily Sapindoideae, which has led the most recent revision to treat the majority of these genera without placing them in a tribe. Another recent study hints at even more incongruity between traditional circumscription and molecular evidence.

Changes have included the synonymization of Distichostemon with Dodonaea, and Neotina and Tinopsis with Tina. Additionally, not all authors agree about the broad circumscription that ensues from placing Xanthoceras as the sister group to the three traditional families as the resulting Sapindaceae sensu lato, unlike the traditional families, is difficult to characterize. As a result, the elevation of Xanthoceroideae to family level was proposed, which would have removed six genera from Sapindaceae and Hippocastanoideae.

This list follows the updated classification of Buerki et al.

== Subfamily Dodonaeoideae ==
=== Tribe Dodonaeae ===
(Kunth) DC. (1824). Type genus: Dodonaea Mill.

- Arfeuillea (Note: The genus might not be distinct from Majidea (Eudicots 2011, p. 375)) Radlkofer (1 Species; Thailand and Laos)
- Averrhoidium Baill. (4 Species; Mexico, Tropical South America)
- Boniodendron Gagnep. (2; southern China and Vietnam)
- Conchopetalum Radlk. (2; Madagascar)
- Cossinia Comm. ex Lam. (3; Mauritius, New Caledonia)
- Diplokeleba N.E.Br. (2 species; South America)
- Diplopeltis Endl. (5 species; Australia)
- Dodonaea Mill. (60+ species; Pantropical)
- Euchorium (Note: Because its fruit has not been described in the literature, this genus' tribal placement is not entirely clear (Eudicots 2011, p. 378)) Ekman & Radlk. (1 species; Cuba)
- Euphorianthus (Note: A replacement name for Radlkofer's own Euphoriopsis (Actes Congr. Bot. Amsterdam 1877:128, 1877) which was preoccupied by a genus of fossil Sapindaceae named by Abramo Bartolommeo Massalongo (Sapind. Foss. Monogr.:12, 1852).) Radlk. (1; Eastern Malesia)
- Harpullia Roxb. (26; India and China to Australasia)
- Hirania Thulin (1; Somalia)
- Llagunoa Ruiz & Pav. (3-4; Andes)
- Loxodiscus Hook.f. (1; New Caledonia)
- Magonia A.St.-Hil. (Note: Not Hist. Pl. Remarq. Brésil:239: although the title page for that work gives the year of publication as 1824, the relevant part was not issued before late 1825 (Stafley & Cowan, Taxon. Lit., ed. 2 4:1067).) (1; (Note: Saint-Hilaire originally described two species, now treated as one, but a generic type has yet to be defined.) Brazil, Bolivia, Paraguay)
- Majidea J.Kirk ex Oliv. (4-5; Africa and Madagascar)

=== Tribe Doratoxyleae ===
Radlk. 1890. Type genus: Doratoxylon Thouars ex Hook.f.

- Doratoxylon Thouars ex Hook.f. (6 species; Mauritius, Madagascar)
- Exothea Macfad. (3; West Indies, Central America)
- Filicium (Note: Thwaites had originally (Hooker's J. Bot. Kew Gard. Misc. 6:65. 1854) named the genus Pterophyllum, but that name had already been applied by Siebold et Zuccarini to a genus of Papaveraceae in 1843 (Abh. Math.-Phys. Cl. Königl. Bayer. Akad. Wiss. 3(3):719).) Thwaites ex Benth. (3-4; Madagascar, East Africa to India, Sri Lanka)
- Ganophyllum Blume (1-2; Paleotropics)
- Hippobromus Eckl. & Zeyh. (1; Africa)
- Hypelate P.Browne (1; West Indies, Florida)
- Smelophyllum Radlk. (1; Cape Provinces of South Africa)
- Zanha Hiern (23; Southern Africa, Madagascar)

=== Incertae sedis ===
- †Wehrwolfea Erwin & Stockey (1; Ypresian, Princeton Chert)

== Subfamily Hippocastanoideae ==
=== Tribe Acereae ===
(Durande) Dumort. (1827). Type genus: Acer L.

- Acer L. (120+; Northern hemisphere)
- Dipteronia Oliv. (2; China)

=== Tribe Hippocastaneae ===
(DC.) Dumort. (1827). Type genus: Aesculus L.

- Aesculus L. (13; Temperate Northern hemisphere)
- Billia Peyr. (2; Mexico to South America)
- Handeliodendron Rehder (1; China)

== Subfamily Sapindoideae ==
=== Tribe Athyaneae ===
Acev.‐Rodr. (2017). Type genus: Athyana (Griseb.) Radlk.

- Athyana Radlk. (1; Peru, Bolivia, Argentina)
- Diatenopteryx Radlk. (2; Southern South America)

=== Tribe Blomieae ===
Buerki & Callm. (2021). Type genus: Blomia Miranda

- Blomia Miranda (1; Mexico, Guatemala and Belize)

=== Tribe Bridgesieae ===
Acev.‐Rodr. (2017). Type genus: Bridgesia Bertero ex Cambess.

- Bridgesia Bertero ex Cambess. (1; Chile)

=== Tribe Cupanieae ===
Blume (1857). Type genus: Cupania L.

- Alectryon Gaertn. (25; Malesia, Australasia and Micronesia)
- Arytera Blume (c. 28; India, Southeast Asia to Australasia)
- Castanospora F.Muell. (1; Australia)
- Cnesmocarpon Adema (1; Australia, Papua New Guinea)
- Cupania L. (c. 50; Neotropical)
- Cupaniopsis Radlk. (60; Malesia to Australasia)
- Dictyoneura Blume (2–3; Malesia, Philippines, Australia)
- Diploglottis Hook.f. (12; Australia, Papua New Guinea)
- Elattostachys (Blume) Radlk. (c. 20; Malesia, Australasia)
- Eurycorymbus Hand.-Mazz. (1 species; China)
- Gloeocarpus Radlk. (1; Philippines)
- Gongrodiscus Radlk. (3; New Caledonia)
- Gongrospermum Radlk. (3; Philippines)
- Guioa Cav. (c. 64; Southeastern Asia to Australasia)
- Jagera Blume (2; Moluccas, New Guinea, Australia)
- Lecaniodiscus Planch. ex Benth. (2; Tropical Africa)
- Lepiderema Radlk. (8; Australia, New Guinea)
- Lepidocupania Buerki, Callm., Munzinger & Lowry (21; western tropical Pacific)
- Lepidopetalum Blume (6; Malesia, Australia)
- Matayba Aubl. (c. 50; Neotropical)
- Mischarytera (Radlk.) H.Turner (3; Australia, Papua New Guinea)
- Mischocarpus (Blume (c. 15; Southeastern Asia to Australia)
- Molinaea Comm. ex Juss. (c. 10; Madagascar and Mascarenes Islands)
- Neoarytera Callm., Buerki, Munzinger & Lowry (4; New Caledonia and Vanuatu)
- Pentascyphus Radlk. (1; French Guiana, Surinam, Brazil)
- Podonephelium Baill. (4; New Caledonia)
- Rhysotoechia Radlk. (c. 14; Australia, Malesia)
- Sarcopteryx Radlk. (12-13; Australia, Moluccas, New Guinea)
- Sarcotoechia Radlk. (c. 11; Australia, Moluccas, New Guinea)
- Scyphonychium Radlk. (1; Brazil, French Guiana)
- Storthocalyx Radlk. (4; New Caledonia)
- Synima Radlk. (2; Australia, New Guinea)
- Tina Schult. (19; Madagascar)
- Toechima Radlk. (c. 8; Australia, New Guinea)
- Trigonachras Radlk. (8; Non-Javanese Malesia & Lesser Sunda)
- Vouarana Aubl. (2; Costa Rica to Brazil)

=== Tribe Guindilieae ===
Buerki, Callm. & Acev.‐Rodr. (2021). Type genus: Guindilia Gillies ex Hook. & Arn.

- Guindilia Gillies ex Hook. & Arn. (3; Southern South America)

=== Tribe Haplocoeleae ===
Buerki & Callm. (2021). Type genus: Haplocoelum Radlk.

- Blighiopsis Van der Veken (1; Central Africa)
- Haplocoelum Radlk. (c. 7; Tropical Africa and Madagascar)

=== Tribe Koelreuterieae ===
Radlk. (1890). Type genus: Koelreuteria Laxm.

- Erythrophysa (Note: Arnott published the name as Erythrophila, which Otto Wilhelm Sonder later (Fl. Cap. 1:237, 1860) "corrected" to Erythrophysa. Nonetheless, the original spelling is correct under the ICBN (Vienna, 2005, art. 60); the need to conserved the corrected spelling was noted as early as 1962 (Verdcourt, B. (1962). "A new species of Erythrophysa E. Mey. ex Arn.(Sapindaceae) from Ethiopia". Journal of the Linnean Society of London, Botany. 58 (372): 201–5. doi:10.1111/j.1095-8339.1962.tb00893.x.), but no formal proposal was published.) E.Mey. ex Arn. (5; South Africa, Madagascar)
- Koelreuteria Laxm. (c. 4; Eastern Asia)
- Stocksia Benth. (1; Near East, Afghanistan)

=== Tribe Melicocceae ===
Blume (1847). Type genus: Melicoccus P.Browne

- Dilodendron Radlk. (3; Neotropical)
- Melicoccus P.Browne (10; Dominican Republic, South America)
- Talisia Aubl. (52; Southern Mexico to South America)
- Tripterodendron Radlk. (1; Brazil)

=== Tribe Nephelieae ===
Radlk. (1890). Type genus: Nephelium L.

- Aporrhiza Radlk. (4–6; Tropical Africa)
- Blighia K.D.Koenig (3; Tropical Africa)
- Chytranthus Hook.f. (25+; Western tropical Africa)
- Cubilia Blume (1; Malesia)
- Dimocarpus Lour. (6; Southern Asia to Australia)
- Glenniea Hook.f. (8; Paleotropical)
- Haplocoelopsis F.G.Davies (1; Central and East Africa)
- Laccodiscus Radlk. (c. 6; West Africa)
- Litchi Sonn. (Note: The first book was published in several edition, the in-octavo edition, vol. 3, p. 255 is often cited.) (1; Southeastern China to Malesia)
- Nephelium L. (Note: The Mantissa Plantarum (Mat. Pl.:125) is often also cited. This was a work published simultaneously as an appendix to volume 2 of the Systema Naturae's 12th and 13th editions. The link is to an online scan of the 13th edition (without the Mantissa), a page-for-page reprint done in Vienna missing only the third volume's errata. See Stafleu & Cowan (1981; Taxon. Lit. 3:106–108) for further details and references.) (c. 16; Southeastern Asia to Malesia)
- Otonephelium (Note: According to Acevedo-Rodríguez et al. (Eudicots 2011, p. 376), the difference from Dimocarpus is "doubtful".) Radlk. (1; Southern India)
- Pancovia Willd. (10–12; West Africa)
- Placodiscus Radlk. (c. 10; Tropical Africa)
- Pometia J.R.Forst. & G.Forst. (2; India and Pacific Islands)
- Radlkofera Gilg (1; Western Africa)
- Xerospermum Blume (2; Bangladesh, Indochina to Eastern Malesia)

=== Tribe Paullinieae ===
(Kunth) DC. (1824). Type genus: Paullinia L.

- Cardiospermum L. (15; Pantropical)
- Lophostigma Radlk. (2; Ecuador, Peru, Bolivia)
- Paullinia L. (c. 190; Neotropics & Africa)
- Serjania Mill. (c. 230; Neotropics)
- Thinouia Triana & Planch. (c. 12; Central and South America)
- Urvillea Kunth (c. 15; Central and South America)

=== Tribe Sapindeae ===
(Kunth) DC. (1824). Type genus: Sapindus L.

- Alatococcus Acev.-Rodr. (1; Brazil)
- Atalaya Blume (12; South Africa, Australia, Malesia)
- Deinbollia Schumach. (c. 38; Southern Africa, Madagascar, Mascarene)
- Eriocoelum Hook.f. (10+; Tropical Africa)
- Hornea Baker (1; Mauritius)
- Lepisanthes Blume (c. 24; Paleotropics, Australia)
- Porocystis Radlk. (2; Brazil, French Guiana)
- Pseudima Radlk. (1; Continental neotropics)
- Sapindus L. (c. 10; Circumtropical)
- Thouinidium radlk. (6;| Central America & Greater Antilles)
- Toulicia Aubl. (12; South America)
- Tristira Radlk. (1;| Philippines, Moluccas, Celebes)
- Zollingeria Kurz (3-4; Indochina, Borneo)

=== Tribe Schleichereae ===
Radlk. (1890). Type genus: Schleichera Willd.

- Amesiodendron Hu (1–3; Southern China to Sumatra)
- Paranephelium Miq. (4; Yunnan to Malesia)
- Pavieasia Pierre (Note: According to Stafleu & Cowan (1983; Taxon. Lit. 4:273), different copies may be bound differently. Other sources cite "1894" as the year of publication.) (1–3; China)
- Phyllotrichum Thorel ex Lecomte (1; Laos)
- Schleichera Willd. (1; Sri Lanka and India to Malesia)
- Sisyrolepis Radlk. (1; Thailand & Cambodia)

=== Tribe Stadmanieae ===
Buerki & Callm. (2021). Type genus: Stadtmannia Lam. ex. Poir.

- Beguea Capuron (1; Madagascar)
- Camptolepis Radlk. (4; East Africa, Madagascar)
- Chouxia Capuron (6; Madagascar)
- Gereaua (Capuron) Buerki & Callm. (1; Madagascar)
- Macphersonia Blume (8; Aldabra, Madagascar, West Tropical Africa)
- Pappea Eckl. & Zeyh. (1; Southern Africa)
- Plagioscyphus Radlk. (c. 10; Madagascar)
- Pseudopteris Baill. (3; Madagascar)
- Stadtmannia Lam. (6; East Tropical Africa, Madagascar, Mauritius)
- Tsingya Capuron (1; Madagascar)

=== Tribe Thouiniaeae ===
Blume (1847). Type genus: Thouinia Poit.

- Allophylastrum Acev.-Rodr. (1; Brazil, Guyana)
- Allophylus L.(211; (Note: The definition of species in the genus is a difficult matter, and species number have ranged from 250 to a single polymorphic one. Since the latter proposal by Pieter Willem Leenhouts (Blumea 15(2):313. 1967), "no progress in an understanding of the systematic structure of Allophylus has been made" (Eudicots 2011, p. 380).) Pantropical)
- Thouinia Poit. (c. 30; West indies, Central America)

=== Tribe Tristiropsideae ===
Buerki & Callm. (2021). Type genus: Tristiropsis Radlk.

- Tristiropsis Radlk. (3; Malesia & Australasia)

=== Tribe Ungnadieae ===
Buerki & Callm. (2021). Type genus: Ungnadia Endl.

- Delavaya Franch. (Note: The paper was issued in two part, the first (pp. 358–368) was included with the November 1886 issue containing proceedings of the society's July meeting. the rest was published in March 1887 alongside the proceedings of the November meeting (Leussink, J.A. (1986). "The publication dates of the Bulletin de la Société Botanique de France (Vols. 26–40, 1879–1893)". Taxon. 35 (2): 247–261 See p. 256. Bibcode:1986Taxon..35..247L. doi:10.2307/1221267. JSTOR 1221267.).) (1; China)
- Ungnadia Endl. (1; Mexico, Texas)

== Subfamily Xanthoceratoideae ==
- Xanthoceras Bunge (Note: This preprint eventually appeared as Mém. Acad. Imp. Sci. St.-Pétersbourg Divers Savans 2:75–147 (1835).) (1; China)

== Incertae sedis ==
- Bizonula Pellegr. (1 species; Gabon)
- Chonopetalum Radlk. (1; Equatorial Guinea)
- Gloeocarpus Radlk. (1; tropical Africa)
- Gongrospermum Radlk. (1; tropical Africa)
- Lychnodiscus Radlk. (c. 7; tropical Africa)
- Namataea D.W.Thomas & D.J.Harris (1; Nigeria and Cameroon)
- Omalocarpus Choux (1; Madagascar)
- Porocystis Radlk. (2; Guianas and northern Brazil)
- Pseudopancovia Pellegr. (1; West Equatorial Africa)

== Fossil genera ==
A number of fossil genera have been placed within Sapindaceae, many being morphogenera and lacking subfamilial identification

=== Foliage morphogenera ===
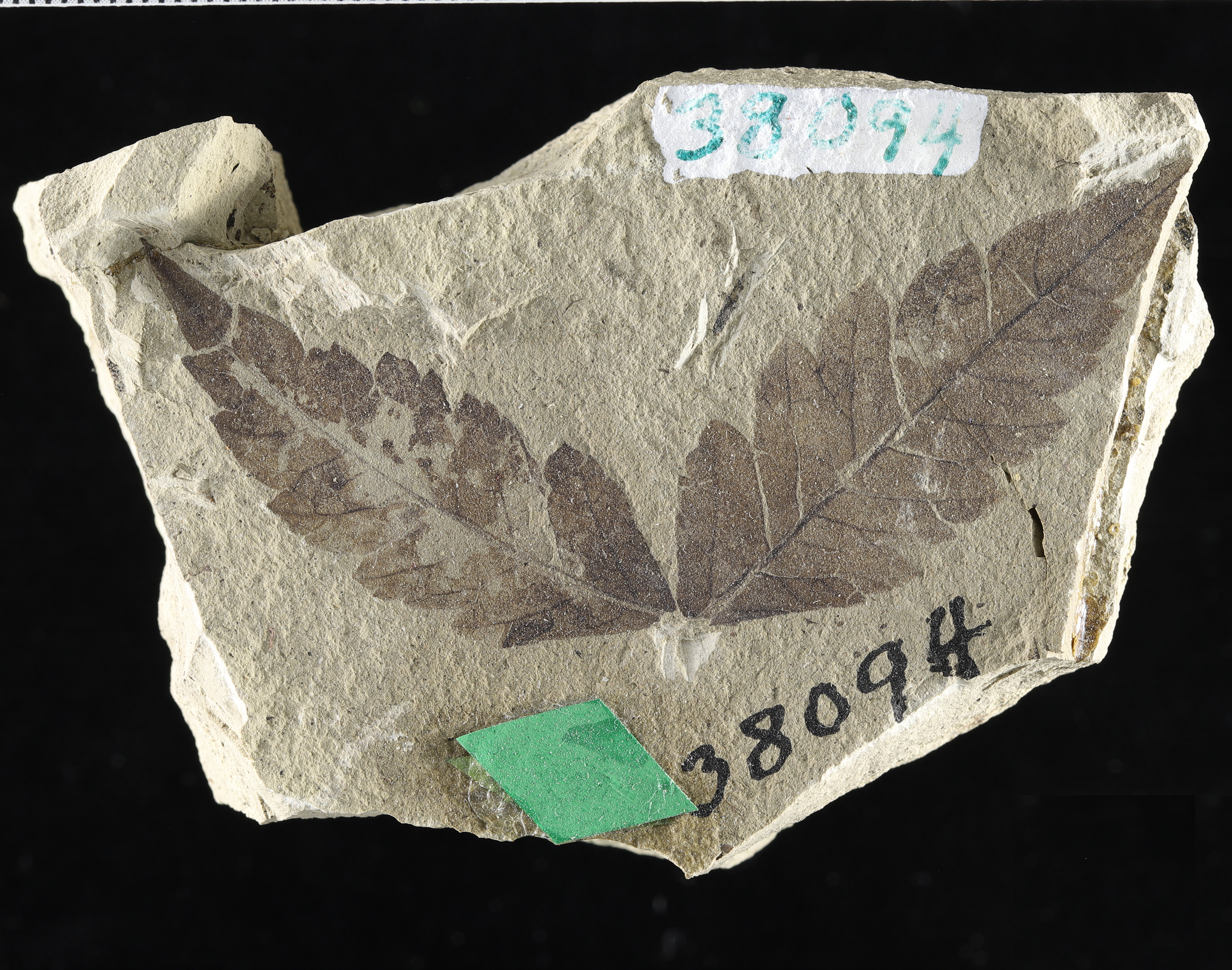
Bohlenia americana lectotype

- †Aesculiphyllum Nathorst (leaves)
- †Bohlenia Wolfe & Wehr (leaves)
- †Monopleurophyllum Andreánszky (leaves)
- †Negundoides Lesquereux (leaves)
- †Nephelites Deane (leaves)
- †Sapindiphyllum Nathorst (leaves)
- †Sapindophyllum Ettingshausen (leaves)

=== Fruit and seed morphogenera ===
- †Cupanites Schimper (fruits)
- †Cupanoides Bowerbank (fruits)
- †Dodonaeaecarpum Andreánszky (fruits)
- †Dodonaeites Saporta (fruits)
- †Euphoriaecarpum Menzel (fruits)
- †Euphoriopsis Massalongo (fruits & leaves)
- †Palaealectryon Reid & Chandler (seeds)
- †Palaeallophylus Reid & Chandler (seeds)
- †Sapindaceaecarpum Andreánszky (fruits)
- †Sapindoidea Kirchheimer (seeds)
- †Sapindospermum Reid & Chandler (seeds)

=== Pollen and cone morphogenera ===
- †Aceripollenites Nagy (pollen)
- †Sapindoidites Thiergart (pollen)
- †Sapindostrobus Ettingshausen (cones)
- †Talisiipites Wodehouse (pollen)

=== Wood morphogenera ===
- †Acerinium Unger (wood)
- †Aceroxylon Loubière (wood)
- †Aesculoxylon Trivedi & Srivastava (wood)
- †Djambioxylon Kräusel (wood)
- †Euphorioxylon Awasthi, Guleria & Lakhanpal (wood)
- †Fraasia Unger (wood)
- †Matayboxylon Suguio & Mussa (wood)
- †Pometioxylon Prakash & Tripathi (wood)
- †Sapindopsoxylon Pfeiffer & van Heurn (wood)
- †Sapindoxylon Kräusel (wood)
- †Schleicheroxylon Awasthi, Guleria, & Lakhanpal (wood)
- †Schmiedeliopsis Felix (wood)
