= Lecaniodiscus punctatus =

Conservation status
- Endangered (IUCN 2.3)

Scientific classification
- Kingdom: Plantae
- Clade: Tracheophytes
- Clade: Angiosperms
- Clade: Eudicots
- Clade: Rosids
- Order: Sapindales
- Family: Sapindaceae
- Genus: Lecaniodiscus
- Species: L. punctatus

Binomial name
- Lecaniodiscus punctatus J.B.Hall

Species of flowering plant

Lecaniodiscus punctatus is a species of plant in the family Sapindaceae. It is a tree native to Cameroon and Ghana. It is threatened by habitat loss.
