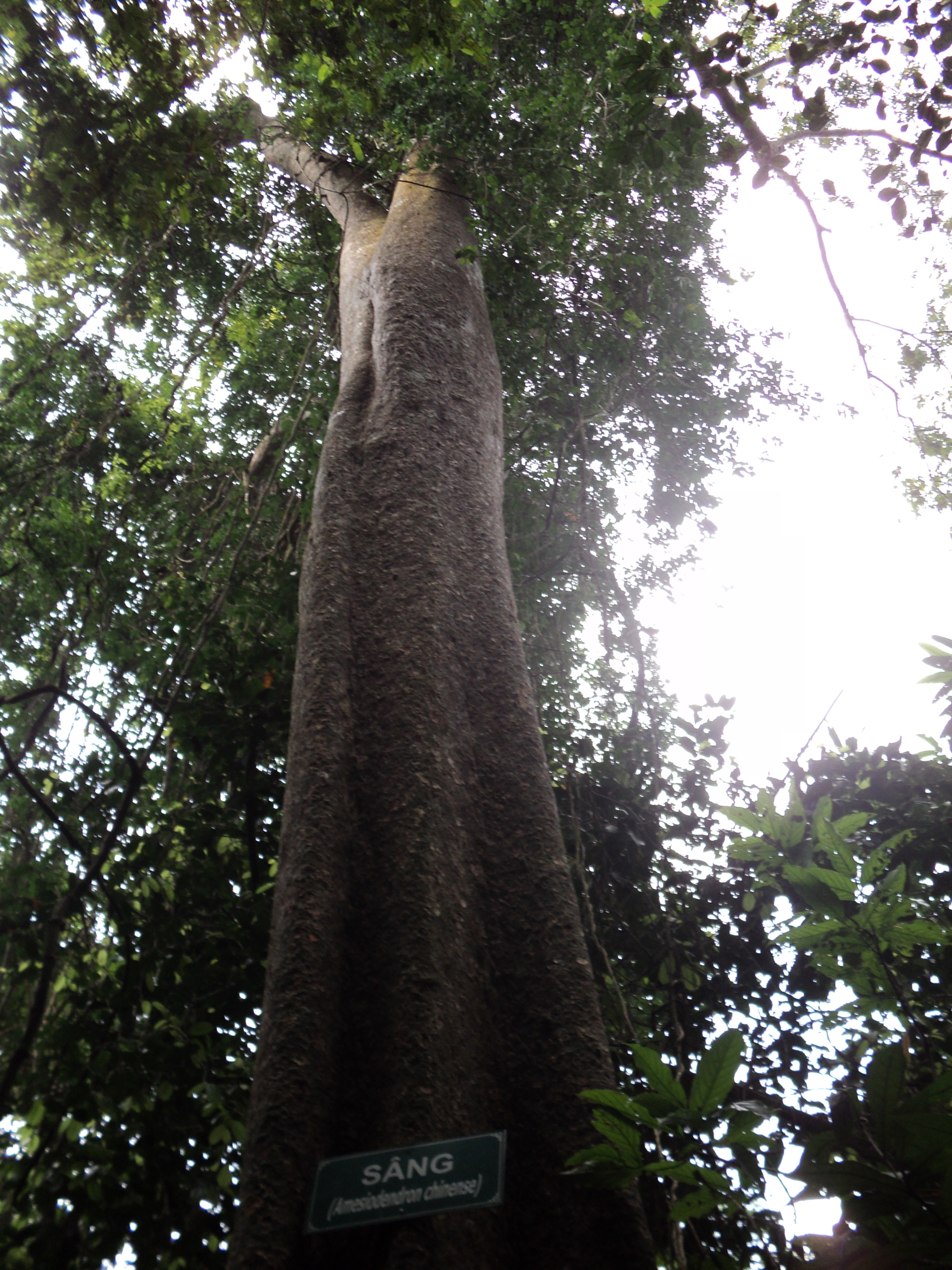
- Amesiodendron chinense in Phong Nha-Kẻ Bàng National Park

Conservation status
- Near Threatened (IUCN 2.3)

Scientific classification
- Kingdom: Plantae
- Clade: Tracheophytes
- Clade: Angiosperms
- Clade: Eudicots
- Clade: Rosids
- Order: Sapindales
- Family: Sapindaceae
- Genus: Amesiodendron
- Species: A. chinense

Binomial name
- Amesiodendron chinense (Merr.) Hu

= Amesiodendron chinense =

Species of flowering plant

Amesiodendron chinense is a species of plant in the family Sapindaceae. It is found in China, Indonesia, Laos, Malaysia, and Vietnam.
