= Storthocalyx =

Scientific classification
- Kingdom: Plantae
- Clade: Tracheophytes
- Clade: Angiosperms
- Clade: Eudicots
- Clade: Rosids
- Order: Sapindales
- Family: Sapindaceae
- Tribe: Cupanieae
- Genus: Storthocalyx; Radlk.

Family of shrubs and trees

Storthocalyx is a genus of shrubs and trees in the family Sapindaceae. The genus is endemic to New Caledonia in the Pacific and contains five species. It is related to Gongrodiscus and Sarcotoechia.

== List of species ==
- Storthocalyx chryseus
- Storthocalyx corymbosus
- Storthocalyx leioneurus
- Storthocalyx pancheri
- Storthocalyx sordidus
