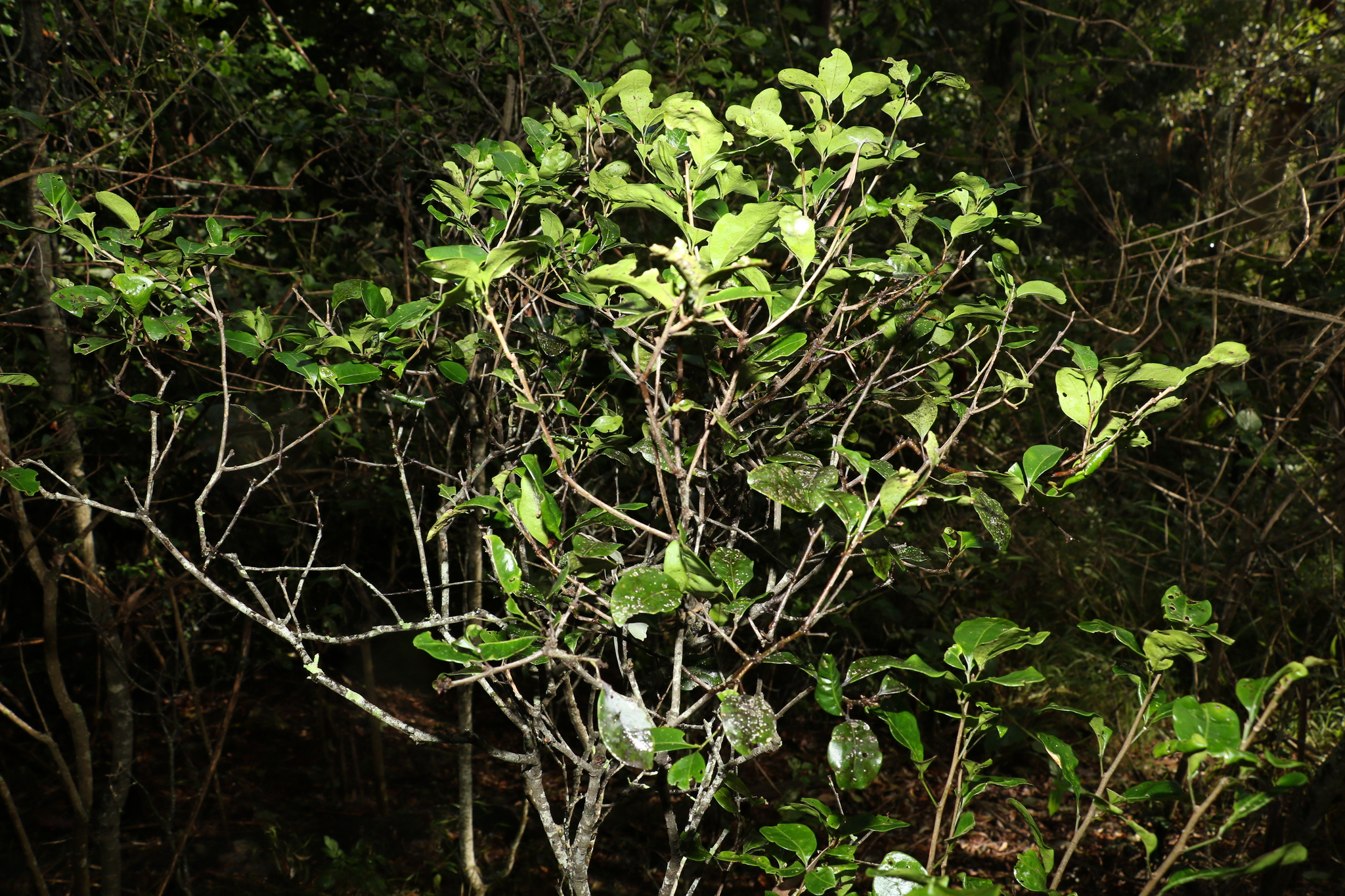

Scientific classification
- Kingdom: Plantae
- Clade: Embryophytes
- Clade: Tracheophytes
- Clade: Spermatophytes
- Clade: Angiosperms
- Clade: Eudicots
- Clade: Rosids
- Order: Sapindales
- Family: Sapindaceae
- Genus: Rhysotoechia
- Species: R. bifoliolata

Binomial name
- Rhysotoechia bifoliolata Radlk.

Synonyms
- Cupania dunnii

= Rhysotoechia bifoliolata =

twin-leaf tuckeroo

Species of tree

Rhysotoechia bifoliolata, commonly known as the twin-leaf tamarind, is a species of tree in the soapberry family. Growing to 30 metres tall in the rainforests of eastern Australia. Found from the Hunter River in New South Wales to northern Queensland.
