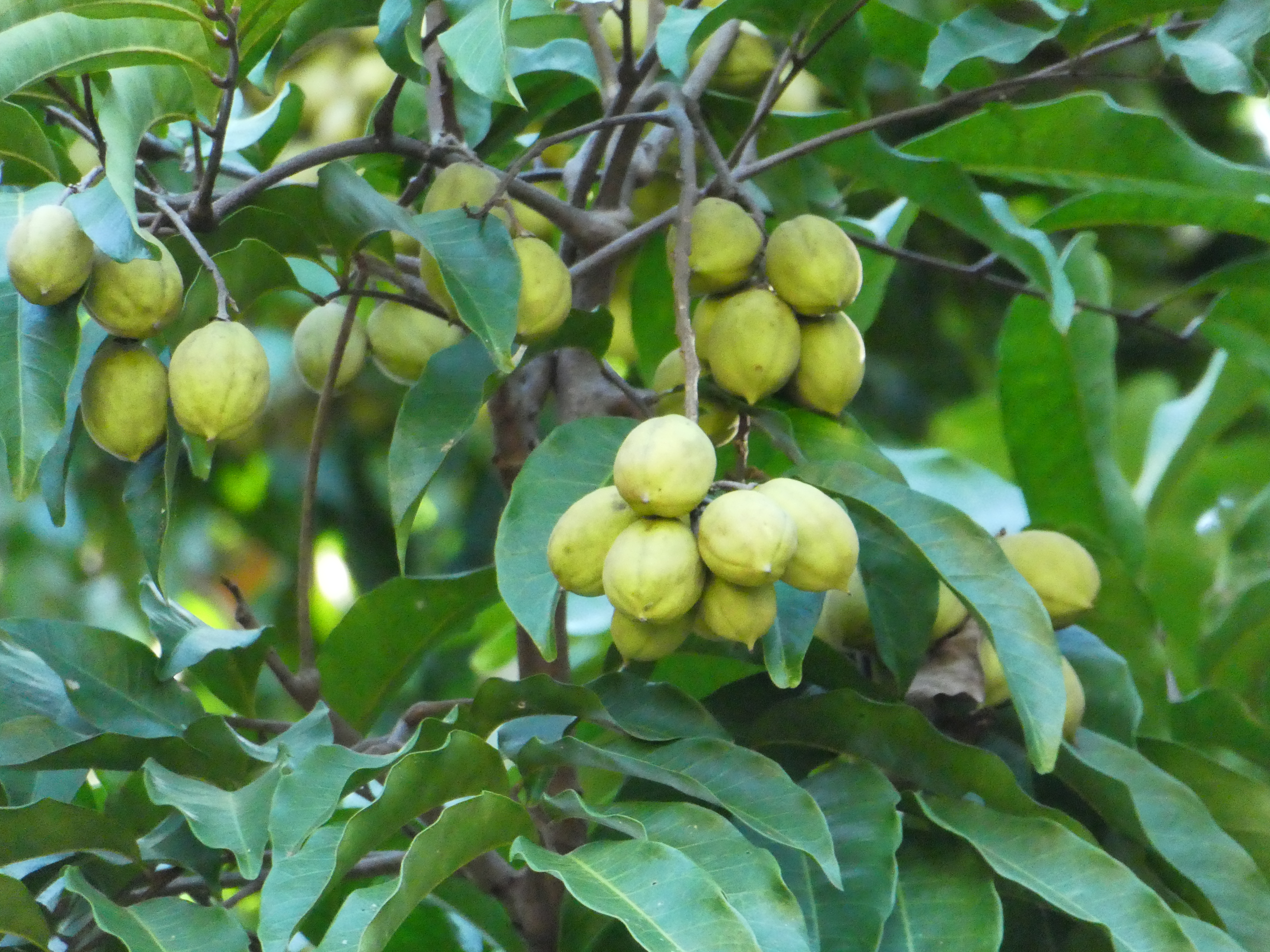
- In Queensland

Scientific classification
- Kingdom: Plantae
- Clade: Tracheophytes
- Clade: Angiosperms
- Clade: Eudicots
- Clade: Rosids
- Order: Sapindales
- Family: Sapindaceae
- Genus: Tristiropsis
- Species: T. acutangula

Binomial name
- Tristiropsis acutangula Radlk.

Synonyms
- Tristiropsis acuteangula; Tristiropsis oblonga Radlk.; Tristiropsis subfalcata Radlk.

= Tristiropsis acutangula =

Species of tree

Tristiropsis acutangula is a tree species of the genus Tristiropsis in the family Sapindaceae. It grows naturally in the Malesian biogeographical region and in northern Australia.

== Description ==
It is a large forest canopy tree growing up to 35 m high, and rarely to over 50 m. The trunk is buttressed at the base and has mainly smooth, or slightly roughened, dark brown bark. The compound leaves are arranged spirally up the branchlets with the leaflets opposite and symmetric. The small (up to 10 mm diameter) white to pale yellow or cream-coloured flowers occur as axillary inflorescences. The fleshy fruit is 20–30 mm long, dark yellow, green or brown in colour, containing a single seed more than 10 mm in diameter.
