= John Horne (botanist) =

Scottish botanist (1835–1905)

John Horne FLS
- Born: 1835; Lethendy, Perthshire, Scotland
- Died: April 16, 1905 (aged 69–70); Jersey, Channel Islands
- Known for: Director of the Botanic Gardens of Pamplemousses; botanical collections in Mauritius and Seychelles
- Scientific career
- Fields: Botany
- Institutions: Botanic Gardens of Pamplemousses, Mauritius
- Author abbrev. (botany): Horne

John Horne FLS (1835–1905) was a Scottish botanist. He served as director of the Botanic Gardens of Pamplemousses, Mauritius.

The Sapindaceae genus Hornea is named after Horne.

== Life ==
Horne was born in Lethendy, Perthshire, Scotland. He worked at Kew in 1859–1860 and at the Botanic Gardens in Mauritius 1861–1891, serving as Director from 1877 onward.

He collected plants in Mauritius and the Seychelles.

Upon his transfer to Fiji, Arthur Gordon hand-picked a retinue of officials to accompany him, including Horne, who moved to Fiji a year after Gordon, in 1876.

Horne died in Jersey in the Channel Islands on 16 April 1905.
