= Neoarytera nekorensis =

Conservation status
- Vulnerable (IUCN 3.1)

Scientific classification
- Kingdom: Plantae
- Clade: Tracheophytes
- Clade: Angiosperms
- Clade: Eudicots
- Clade: Rosids
- Order: Sapindales
- Family: Sapindaceae
- Genus: Neoarytera
- Species: N. nekorensis

Binomial name
- Neoarytera nekorensis (H.Turner) Callm., Buerki, Munzinger & Lowry (2020)

Synonyms
- Arytera nekorensis H.Turner

Species of flowering plant

Neoarytera nekorensis is a species of plant in the family Sapindaceae. It is a tree endemic to New Caledonia.
