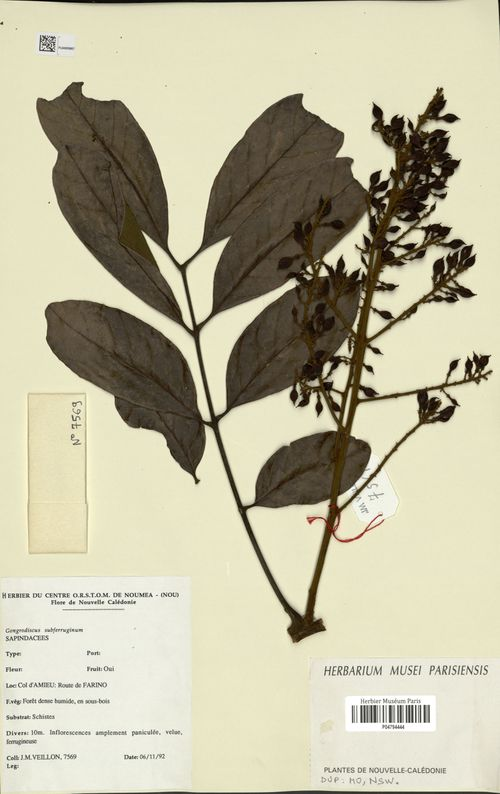
- A preserved specimen of Gongrodiscus sufferrugineus

Scientific classification
- Kingdom: Plantae
- Clade: Tracheophytes
- Clade: Angiosperms
- Clade: Eudicots
- Clade: Rosids
- Order: Sapindales
- Family: Sapindaceae
- Tribe: Cupanieae
- Genus: Gongrodiscus; Radlk.

= Gongrodiscus =

Genus of flowering plants

Gongrodiscus is a genus of shrubs and trees in the family Sapindaceae. The genus is endemic to New Caledonia in the Pacific and contains three species. It is related to Sarcotoechia and Storthocalyx.

== List of species ==
- Gongrodiscus bilocularis H. Turner
- Gongrodiscus parvifolius Radlk.
- Gongrodiscus sufferugineus Radlk.
