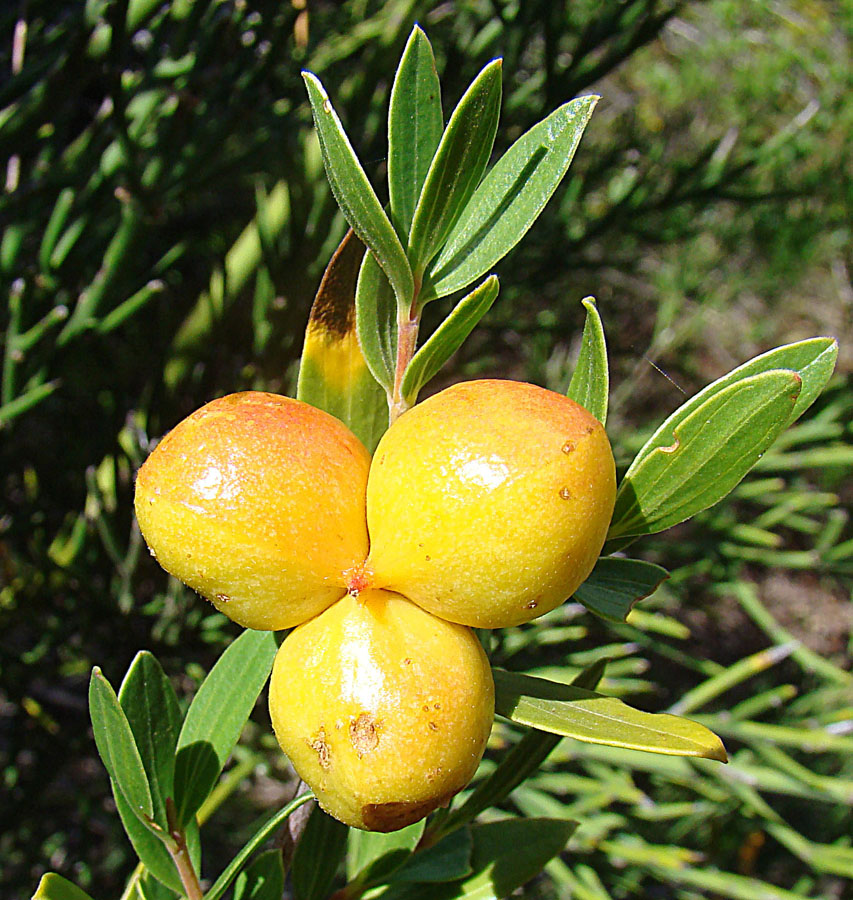

Scientific classification
- Kingdom: Plantae
- Clade: Tracheophytes
- Clade: Angiosperms
- Clade: Eudicots
- Clade: Rosids
- Order: Sapindales
- Family: Sapindaceae
- Genus: Guindilia; Gillies ex Hook. & Arn.

= Guindilia =

Genus of plants

Guindilia is a genus of flowering plants belonging to the family Sapindaceae.

Its native range is Chile to Northwestern Argentina.

Species:

- Guindilia cristata (Radlk.) Hunz.
- Guindilia dissecta (Covas & Burkart) A.T.Hunziker
- Guindilia trinervis Gillies ex Hook. & Arn.
