= Stadtmannia =

Scientific classification
- Kingdom: Plantae
- Clade: Tracheophytes
- Clade: Angiosperms
- Clade: Eudicots
- Clade: Rosids
- Order: Sapindales
- Family: Sapindaceae
- Genus: Stadtmannia; Lam. ex Poir.

Synonyms
- Pseudolitchi Danguy & Choux

Genus of flowering plant

Stadtmannia is a genus of flowering plants belonging to the family Sapindaceae.

Its native range is Kenya to the Northern Provinces, Tanzania and Zimbabwe (in Southern Africa) and the islands of Madagascar and Mauritius, in the western Indian Ocean.

It is listed as being extinct on the island of Réunion, the other species are listed on the IUCN Red lists.

The genus name of Stadtmannia is in honour of Jean Frédéric Stadtmann (1762–1807), a French doctor, botanist and draftsman. It was first described and published in J.B.A.M. de Lamarck, Encycl. Vol.7 on page 376 in 1806.

== Known species ==
According to Kew:

- Stadtmannia acuminata Capuron
- Stadtmannia excelsa Capuron
- Stadtmannia glauca Capuron
- Stadtmannia leandrii Capuron
- Stadtmannia oppositifolia Lam.
- Stadtmannia serrulata Capuron
