= Pseudopancovia =

Scientific classification
- Kingdom: Plantae
- Clade: Tracheophytes
- Clade: Angiosperms
- Clade: Eudicots
- Clade: Rosids
- Order: Sapindales
- Family: Sapindaceae
- Genus: Pseudopancovia; Pellegr. (1955)
- Species: P. heteropetala

Binomial name
- Pseudopancovia heteropetala Pellegr. (1955)

Genus of plants

Pseudopancovia heteropetala is a species of flowering plant belonging to the family Sapindaceae. It is the sole species in genus Pseudopancovia .

Its native range is Gabon and Republic of the Congo in Western Central Tropical Africa.
