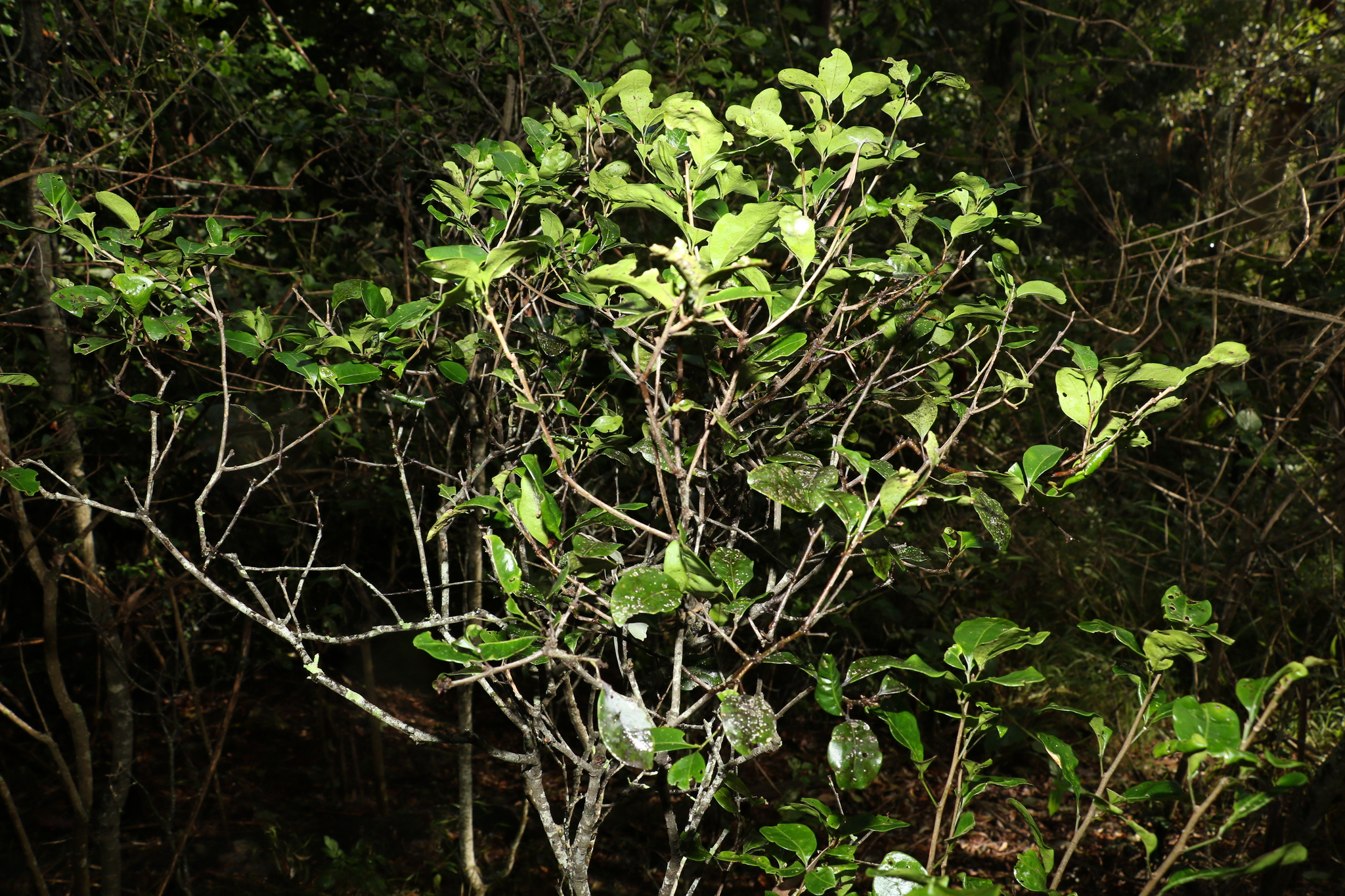
- Rhysotoechia bifoliolata

Scientific classification
- Kingdom: Plantae
- Clade: Embryophytes
- Clade: Tracheophytes
- Clade: Spermatophytes
- Clade: Angiosperms
- Clade: Eudicots
- Clade: Rosids
- Order: Sapindales
- Family: Sapindaceae
- Tribe: Cupanieae
- Genus: Rhysotoechia; Radlk.

Species
- See text

= Rhysotoechia =

Genus of trees

Rhysotoechia is a genus of plants in the soapberry family Sapindaceae which is native to parts of Malesia and Australia.

== Taxonomy ==
The genus was created in 1879 by the Bavarian-born botanist Ludwig Adolph Timotheus Radlkofer. The type species is Rhysotoechia mortoniana, based on Cupania mortoniana F.Muell..

== Distribution and habitat ==
Species in this genus inhabit rainforest or rainforest margins, from Borneo east to New Guinea, and from the Philippines south to eastern Australia.

== Species ==
The following list includes all 19 species of Rhysotoechia that are accepted by both Plants of the World Online and the Global Biodiversity Information Facility.

- Rhysotoechia applanata Etman - Papua New Guinea
- Rhysotoechia bifoliolata Radlk. - Queensland, New South Wales
  - R. b. subsp. nitida S.T.Reynolds - Queensland
- Rhysotoechia bilocularis Etman - Western New Guinea
- Rhysotoechia congesta Etman - Papua New Guinea
- Rhysotoechia elongata Radlk. - Papua New Guinea
- Rhysotoechia etmanii W.N.Takeuchi - Papua New Guinea
- Rhysotoechia flavescens Radlk. - Queensland
- Rhysotoechia florulenta S.T.Reynolds - Queensland
- Rhysotoechia gracilipes Radlk. - Papua New Guinea
- Rhysotoechia grandifolia Radlk. - Borneo, Maluku Islands
- Rhysotoechia koordersii Radlk. - Borneo, Sulawesi
- Rhysotoechia longipaniculata Kaneh. & Hatus. - Western New Guinea
- Rhysotoechia momiensis Kaneh. & Hatus. - Western New Guinea
- Rhysotoechia mortoniana (F.Muell.) Radlk. - Queensland
- Rhysotoechia multiscapa Etman - Papua New Guinea
- Rhysotoechia obtusa Etman - Papua New Guinea
- Rhysotoechia ramiflora Radlk. - Borneo, Philippines, Sulawesi
- Rhysotoechia robertsonii Radlk. - Papua New Guinea, Queensland
- Rhysotoechia welzeniana W.N.Takeuchi - Papua New Guinea
