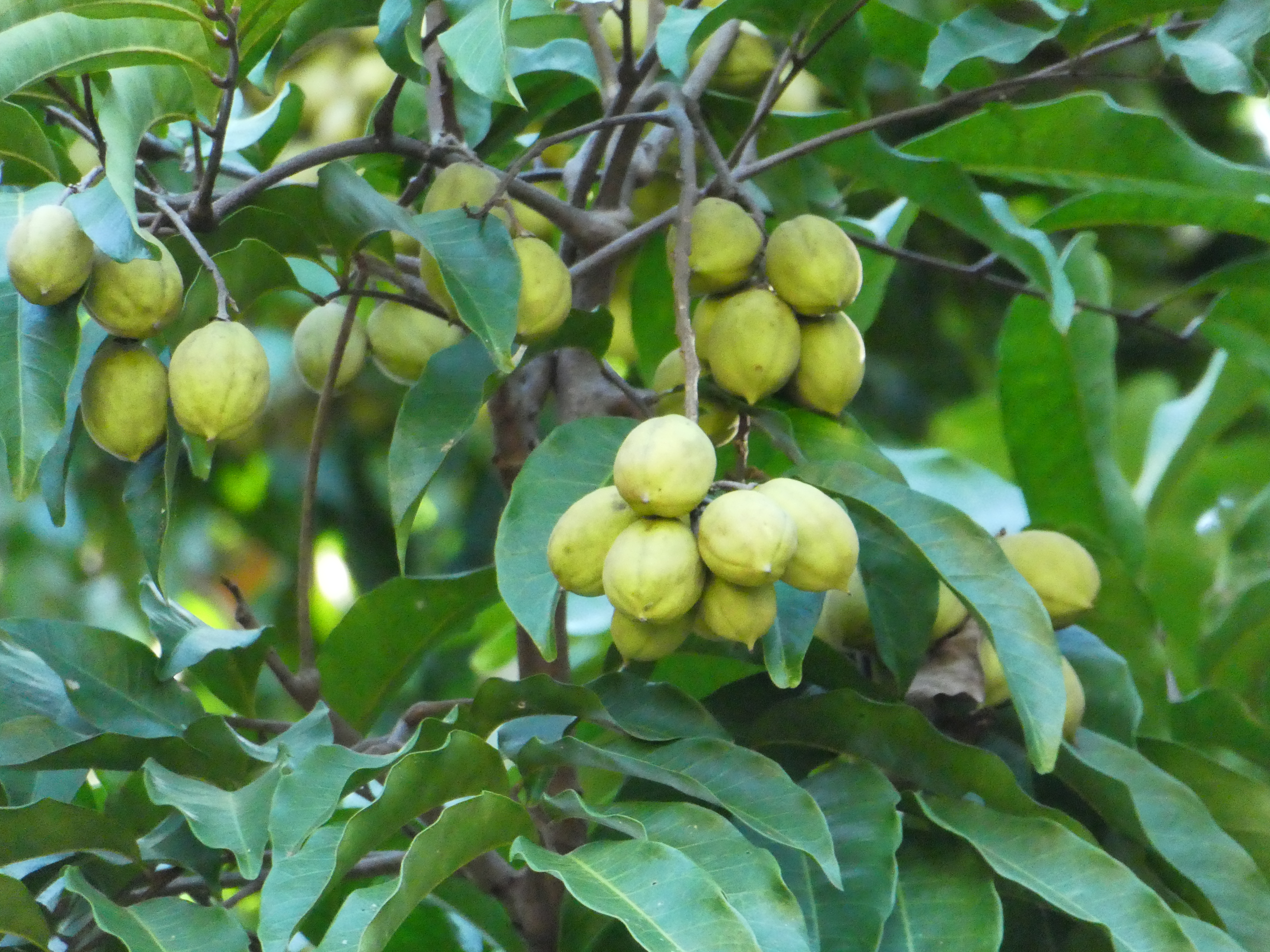
- Tristiropsis acutangula fruiting in Cairns

Scientific classification
- Kingdom: Plantae
- Clade: Tracheophytes
- Clade: Angiosperms
- Clade: Eudicots
- Clade: Rosids
- Order: Sapindales
- Family: Sapindaceae
- Subfamily: Sapindoideae
- Genus: Tristiropsis; Radlk.

Species
- See text

Synonyms
- Palaoea Kaneh.

= Tristiropsis =

Genus of flowering plants

Tristiropsis is a genus of flowering plants of the family Sapindaceae. Its native range is Malesia, Queensland and some islands of the western Pacific.

== Species ==
As of October 2025, Plants of the World Online and the Catalogue of Life accept the following three species:

- Tristiropsis acutangula Radlk. – New Guinea, New Britain, New Ireland, Moluccas, Sulawesi, Borneo, Philippines, Flores, Timor, Solomon Islands, Palau, Guam, Queensland, Christmas Island
- Tristiropsis apetala Leenh. – Papua New Guinea
- Tristiropsis ferruginea Leenh. – Borneo
