= Omalocarpus =

Scientific classification
- Kingdom: Plantae
- Clade: Tracheophytes
- Clade: Angiosperms
- Clade: Eudicots
- Clade: Rosids
- Order: Sapindales
- Family: Sapindaceae
- Genus: Omalocarpus; Choux (1926)
- Species: O. macrophyllus

Binomial name
- Omalocarpus macrophyllus Choux (1926)

Genus of plants

Omalocarpus macrophyllus is a species of flowering plant in family Sapindaceae. It is endemic to Madagascar. It is the sole species in genus Omalocarpus.
