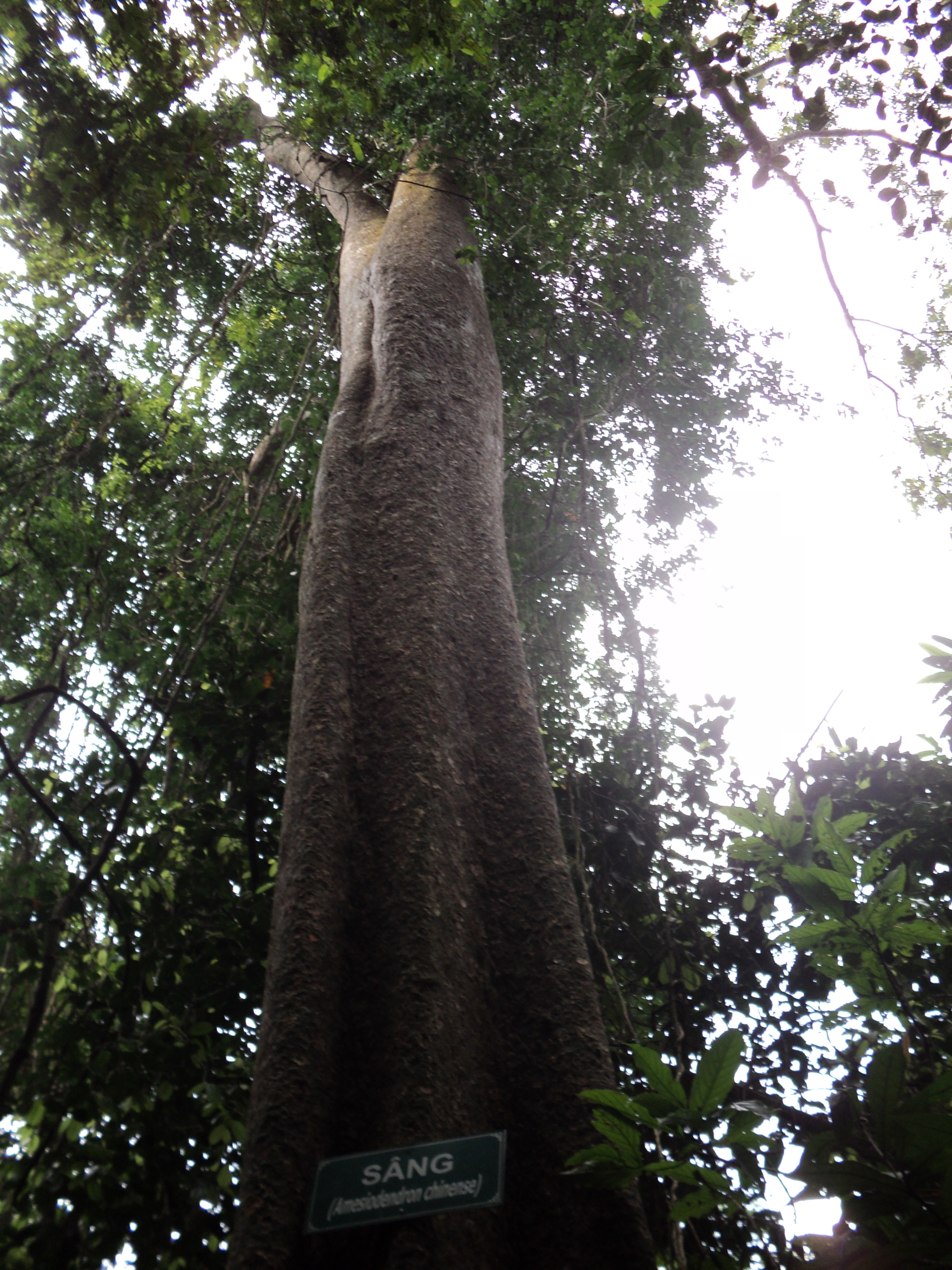

Scientific classification
- Kingdom: Plantae
- Clade: Tracheophytes
- Clade: Angiosperms
- Clade: Eudicots
- Clade: Rosids
- Order: Sapindales
- Family: Sapindaceae
- Subfamily: Sapindoideae
- Genus: Amesiodendron; Hu

= Amesiodendron =

Genus of flowering plants

Amesiodendron is a genus of plant in family Sapindaceae. It contains the following species (but this list may be incomplete):

- Amesiodendron chinense (Merr.) Hu
