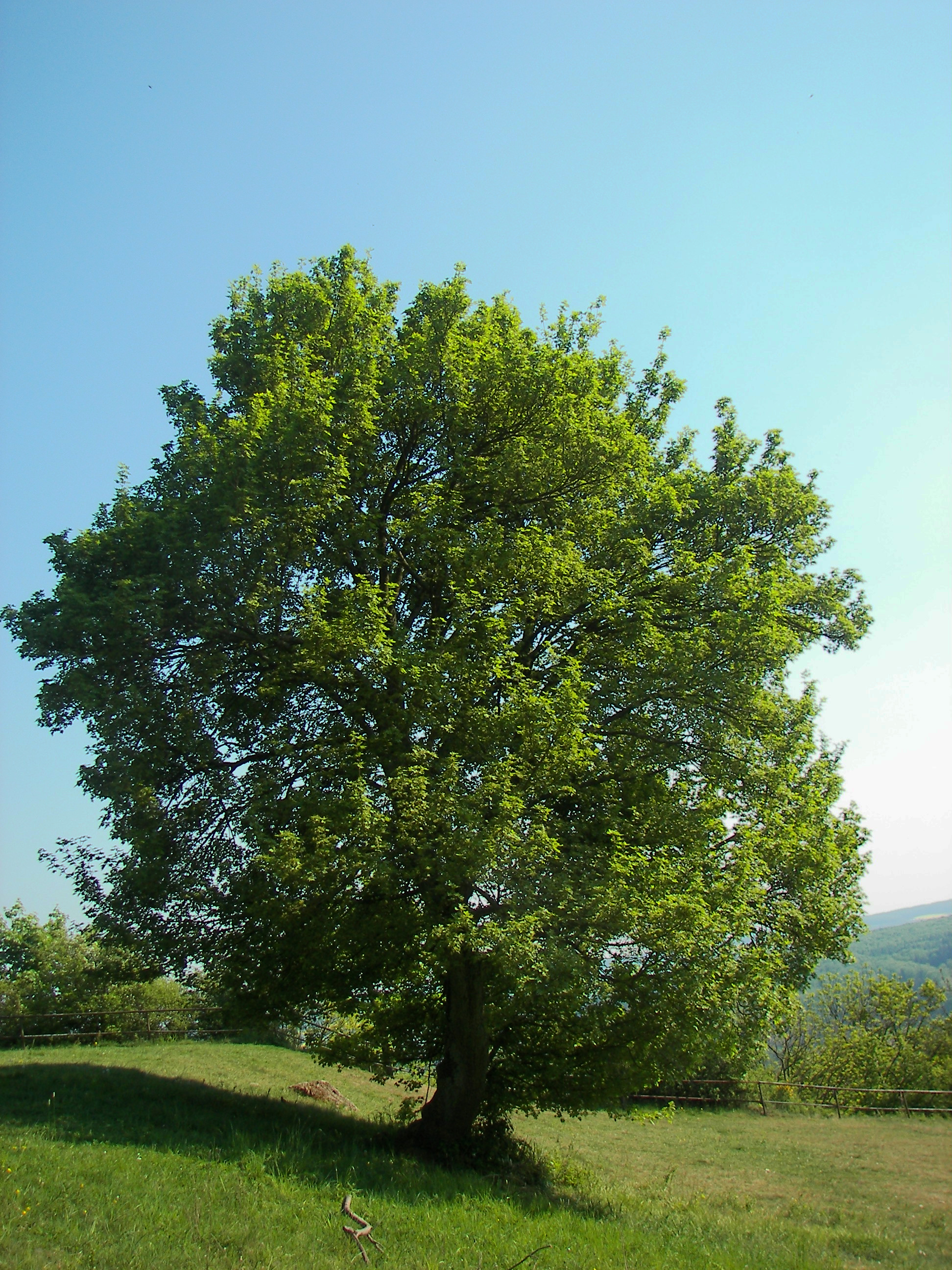
- Field maple Acer campestre, in Ebsdorfergrund-Frauenberg, Hesse, Germany

Scientific classification
- Kingdom: Plantae
- Clade: Tracheophytes
- Clade: Angiosperms
- Clade: Eudicots
- Clade: Rosids
- Order: Sapindales
- Family: Sapindaceae
- Subfamily: Hippocastanoideae
- Tribe: Acereae

Genera
- Acer; Dipteronia

= Acereae =

Tribe of Sapindaceae

Acereae are a tribe in the subfamily Hippocastanoideae in the family Sapindaceae. They were formerly considered the family Aceraceae, however recent research (Harrington et al. 2005) has shown that while both Aceraceae and Hippocastanaceae are monophyletic in themselves, their removal from Sapindaceae sensu lato would leave Sapindaceae sensu stricto as a paraphyletic group, particularly with reference to the genus Xanthoceras, thus the Angiosperm Phylogeny Group now includes both the Aceraceae and the Hippocastanaceae in the Sapindaceae.

They contain two to four genera, depending upon the circumscription, of some 120 species of trees and shrubs. A common characteristic is that the leaves are opposite, and the fruit a schizocarp.

== Gallery ==
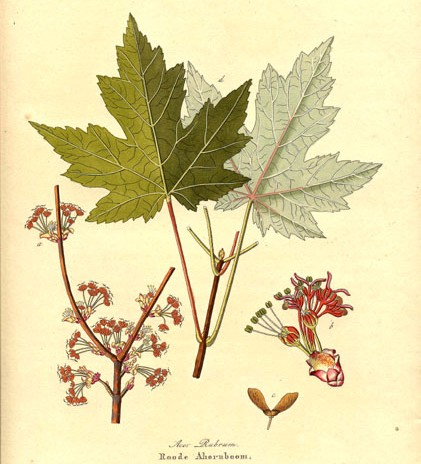
Acer saccharinum

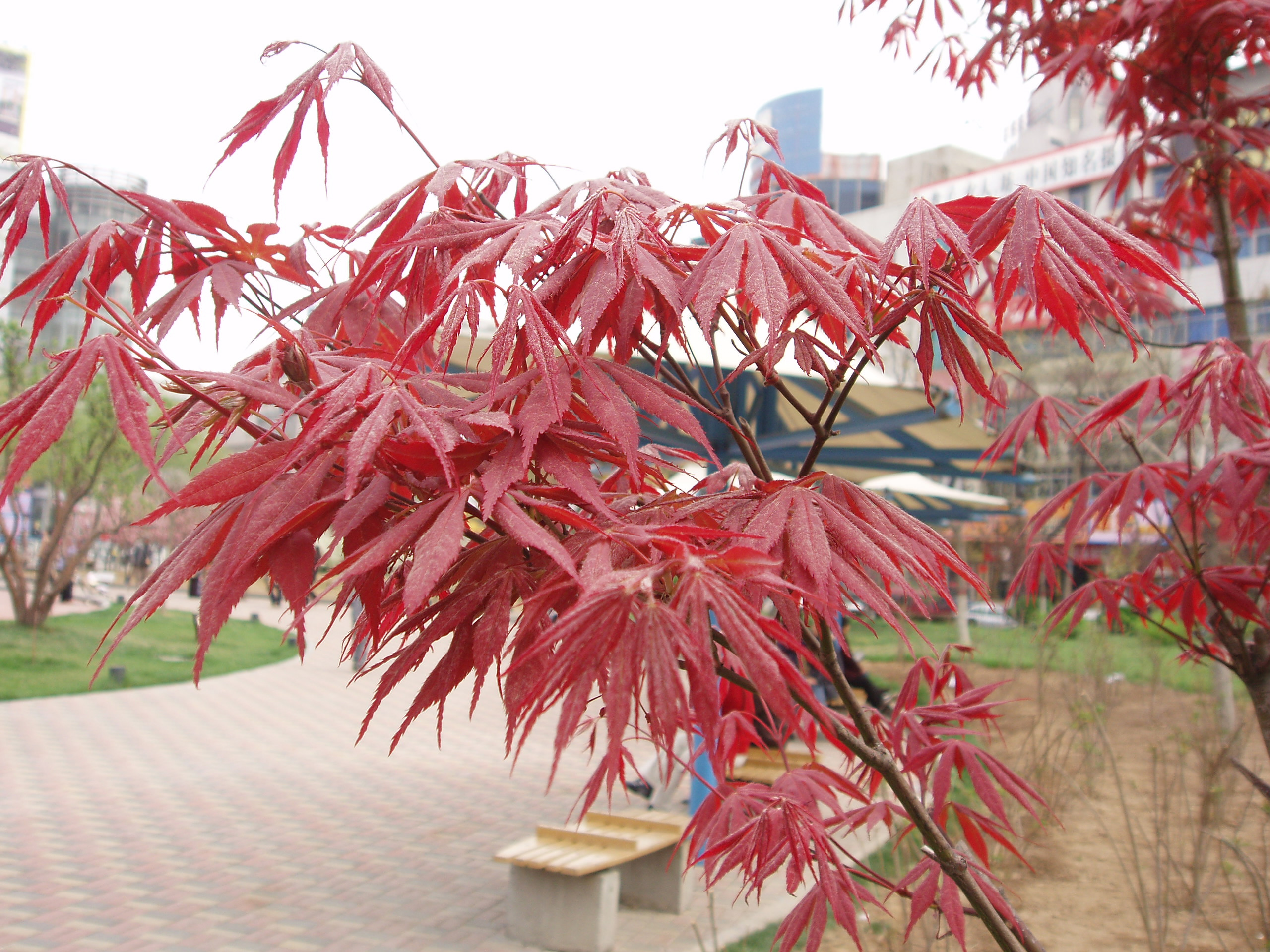
Acer palmatum
