= Chonopetalum =

Conservation status
- Data Deficient (IUCN 3.1)

Scientific classification
- Kingdom: Plantae
- Clade: Tracheophytes
- Clade: Angiosperms
- Clade: Eudicots
- Clade: Rosids
- Order: Sapindales
- Family: Sapindaceae
- Genus: Chonopetalum; Radlk. (1920)
- Species: C. stenodictyum

Binomial name
- Chonopetalum stenodictyum Radlk. (1920)

Genus of flowering plants

Chonopetalum stenodictyum is a species of flowering plant belonging to the family Sapindaceae. It is a tree endemic to mainland Equatorial Guinea in west-central tropical Africa. It is the sole species in genus Chonopetalum.
