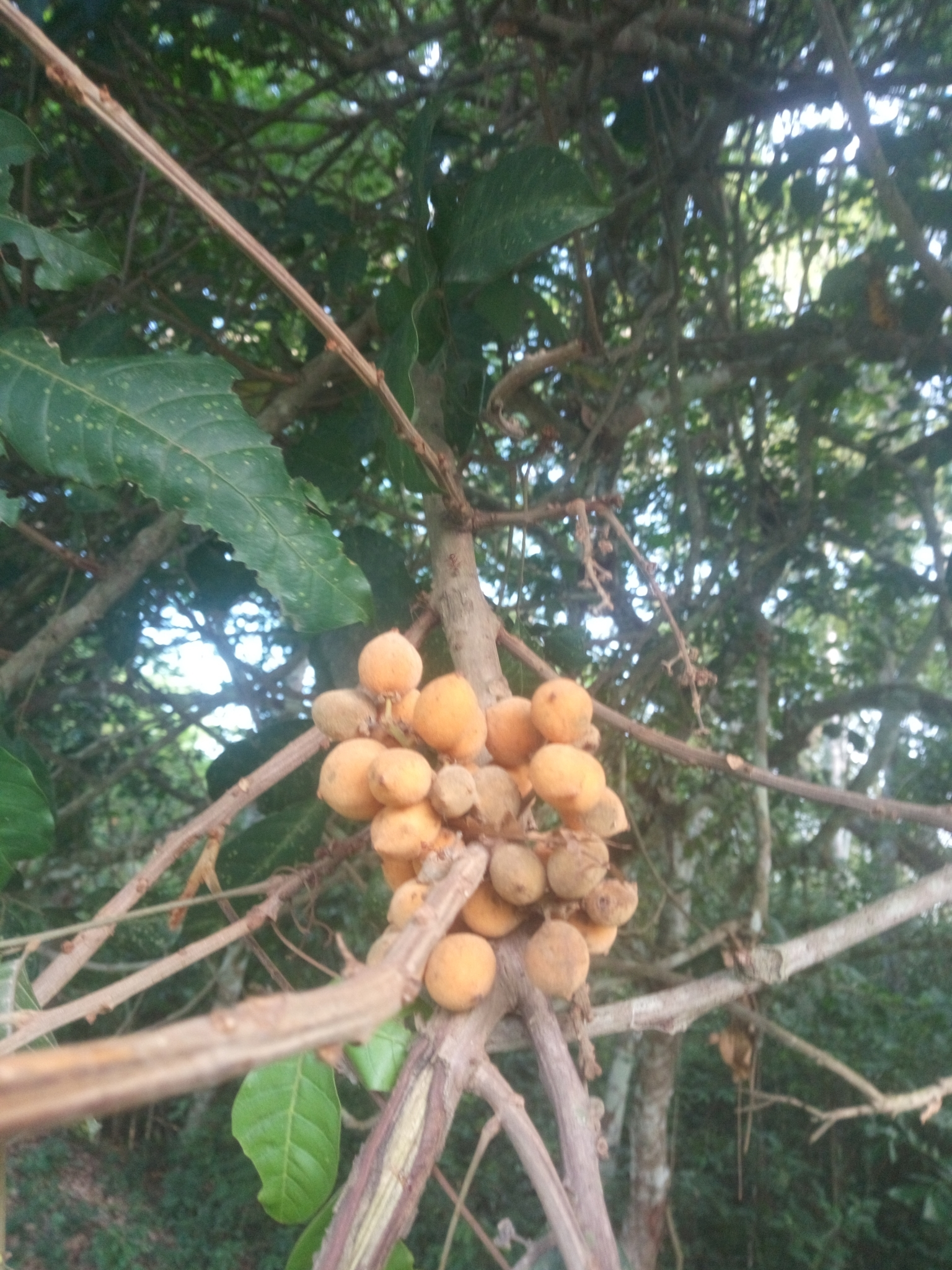
- Lecaniodiscus cupanioides in Benin

Scientific classification
- Kingdom: Plantae
- Clade: Tracheophytes
- Clade: Angiosperms
- Clade: Eudicots
- Clade: Rosids
- Order: Sapindales
- Family: Sapindaceae
- Tribe: Cupanieae
- Genus: Lecaniodiscus; Planch. ex Benth. (1849)

Synonyms
- Chiarinia Chiov. (1932)

= Lecaniodiscus =

Genus of flowering plants

Lecaniodiscus is a genus of plants in the family Sapindaceae. It contains three species native to tropical Africa:

- Lecaniodiscus cupanioides Planch. ex Benth.
- Lecaniodiscus fraxinifolius Baker
- Lecaniodiscus punctatus J.B.Hall
