= Neoarytera =

Scientific classification
- Kingdom: Plantae
- Clade: Tracheophytes
- Clade: Angiosperms
- Clade: Eudicots
- Clade: Rosids
- Order: Sapindales
- Family: Sapindaceae
- Subfamily: Sapindoideae
- Tribe: Cupanieae
- Genus: Neoarytera; Callm., Buerki, Munzinger & Lowry (2020)

Species
- Neoarytera chartacea (Radlk.) Callm., Buerki, Munzinger & Lowry; Neoarytera collina (Pancher & Sebert) Callm., Buerki, Munzinger & Lowry; Neoarytera nekorensis (H.Turner) Callm., Buerki, Munzinger & Lowry; Neoarytera neoebudensis (Guillaumin) Callm., Buerki, Munzinger & Lowry

Genus of flowering plants

Neoarytera is a genus of flowering plants in family Sapindaceae. It includes four species native to New Caledonia and Vanuatu.

- Neoarytera chartacea (Radlk.) Callm., Buerki, Munzinger & Lowry – New Caledonia
- Neoarytera collina (Pancher & Sebert) Callm., Buerki, Munzinger & Lowry – New Caledonia
- Neoarytera nekorensis (H.Turner) Callm., Buerki, Munzinger & Lowry – west-central New Caledonia
- Neoarytera neoebudensis (Guillaumin) Callm., Buerki, Munzinger & Lowry – New Caledonia and Vanuatu
