= Bizonula =

Conservation status
- Critically Endangered (IUCN 3.1)

Scientific classification
- Kingdom: Plantae
- Clade: Embryophytes
- Clade: Tracheophytes
- Clade: Spermatophytes
- Clade: Angiosperms
- Clade: Eudicots
- Clade: Rosids
- Order: Sapindales
- Family: Sapindaceae
- Genus: Bizonula; Pellegr. (1924)
- Species: B. letestui

Binomial name
- Bizonula letestui Pellegr. (1924)

Genus of flowering plants

Bizonula letestui is a species of flowering plant belonging to the family Sapindaceae. It is a tree endemic to Gabon in west-central tropical Africa. It is the sole species in genus Bizonula.

It is known only from a single population at 300 meters elevation in the Mayombe bayaka forest, north of Tchibanga in Nyanga Province of Gabon. The population is outside of protected areas, and it is threatened by logging and habitat loss from forest degradation. The species is assessed as Critically Endangered by the IUCN.
