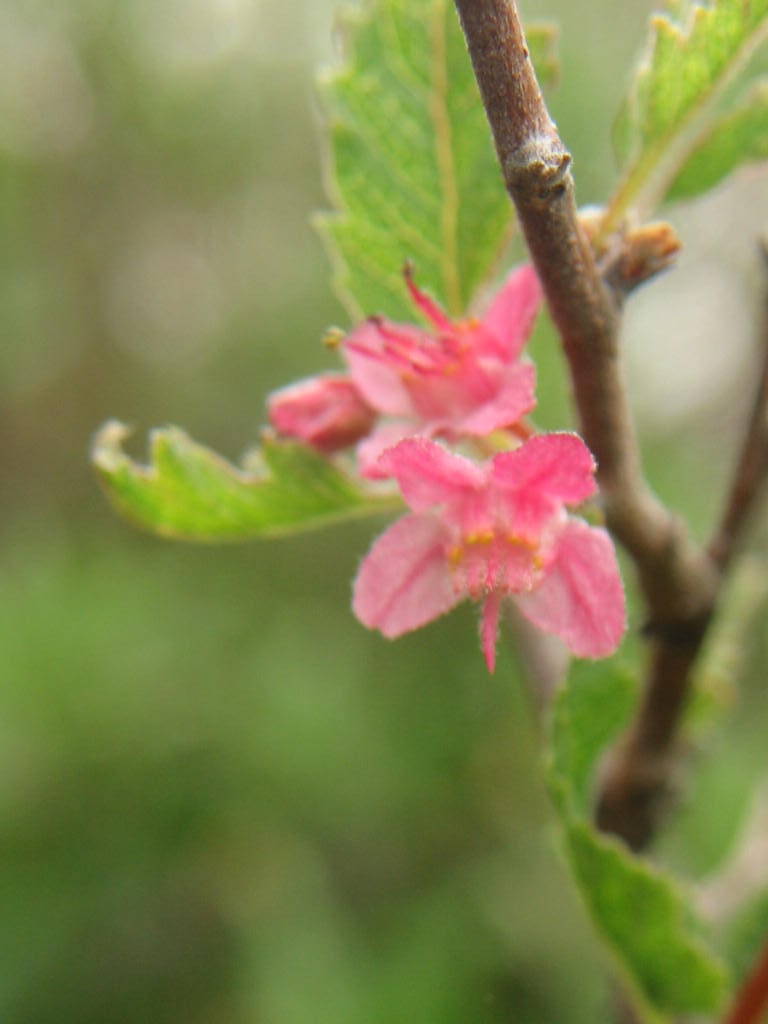

Scientific classification
- Kingdom: Plantae
- Clade: Tracheophytes
- Clade: Angiosperms
- Clade: Eudicots
- Clade: Rosids
- Order: Sapindales
- Family: Sapindaceae
- Subfamily: Sapindoideae
- Genus: Bridgesia; Bertero ex Cambess. (nom. cons.)
- Species: B. incisifolia

Binomial name
- Bridgesia incisifolia Bertero ex Cambess.

= Bridgesia =

Genus of flowering plants

Bridgesia is a genus of flowering plants in the family Sapindaceae. The sole species, Bridgesia incisifolia, grows as a shrub in Chile.
