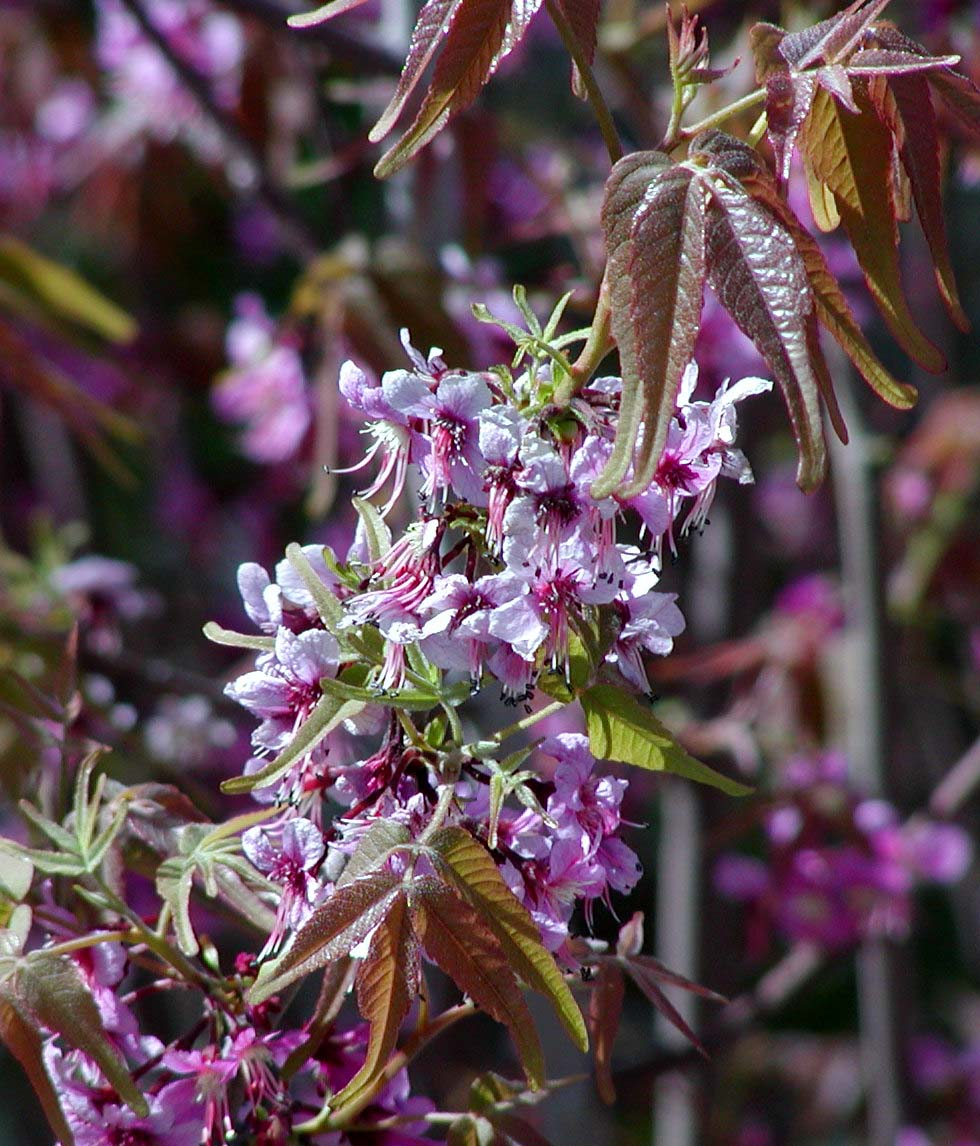
- Mexican buckeye flowers

Conservation status
- Least Concern (IUCN 3.1)

Scientific classification
- Kingdom: Plantae
- Clade: Tracheophytes
- Clade: Angiosperms
- Clade: Eudicots
- Clade: Rosids
- Order: Sapindales
- Family: Sapindaceae
- Subfamily: Sapindoideae
- Genus: Ungnadia; Endl.
- Species: U. speciosa

Binomial name
- Ungnadia speciosa Endl.
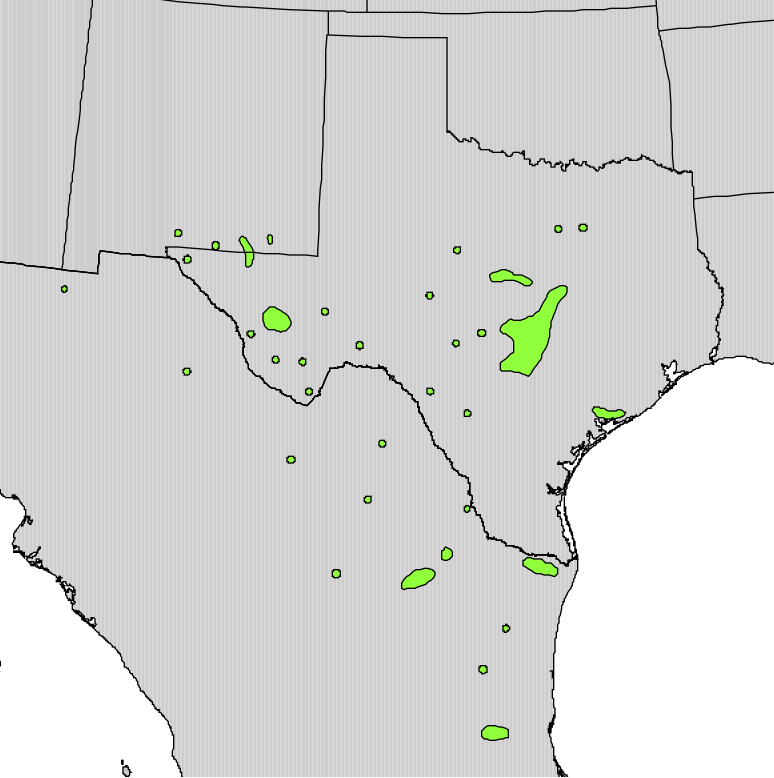
- natural range

= Ungnadia =

Mexican buckeye

Genus of trees

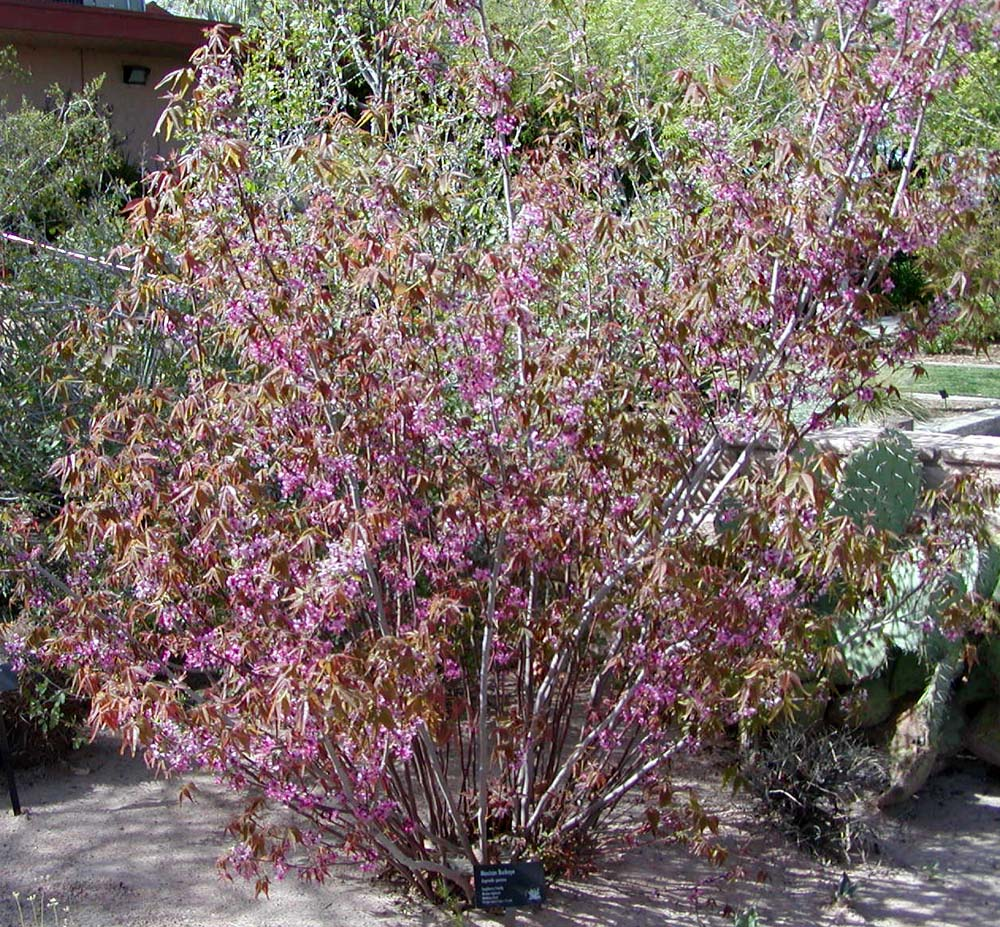
Mexican buckeye form

Ungnadia is a genus of flowering plants in the family Sapindaceae, containing one species, Ungnadia speciosa, commonly known as the Mexican buckeye. It is native to northern Mexico, as well as Texas and southern New Mexico in the United States. The name honors Austrian ambassador Baron David Ungnad von Sonnegg, son of Andreas Ungnad von Sonnegg, who brought the horse chestnut (Aesculus hippocastanum) to Vienna in 1576, introducing the plant into western Europe.

It differs from the buckeyes in the related genus Aesculus but the seeds and nuts are similar. Another similar related genus is the soapberry (genus Sapindus). Ungnadia seeds are poisonous despite their sweetness, and sometimes used as marbles. The foliage is toxic and rarely browsed by livestock, but bees produce honey from the floral nectar.

== Description ==
Ungnadia speciosa is a deciduous shrub or small tree (< 25 ft) that is often multi-trunked. The leaves (5–12 inches or 13–30 centimetres) are alternate and pinnately compound with 5 to 9 leaflets. The leaflets are long (3–5 inches or 7.6–12.7 centimetres), narrow, and pointed with slight serrations.
