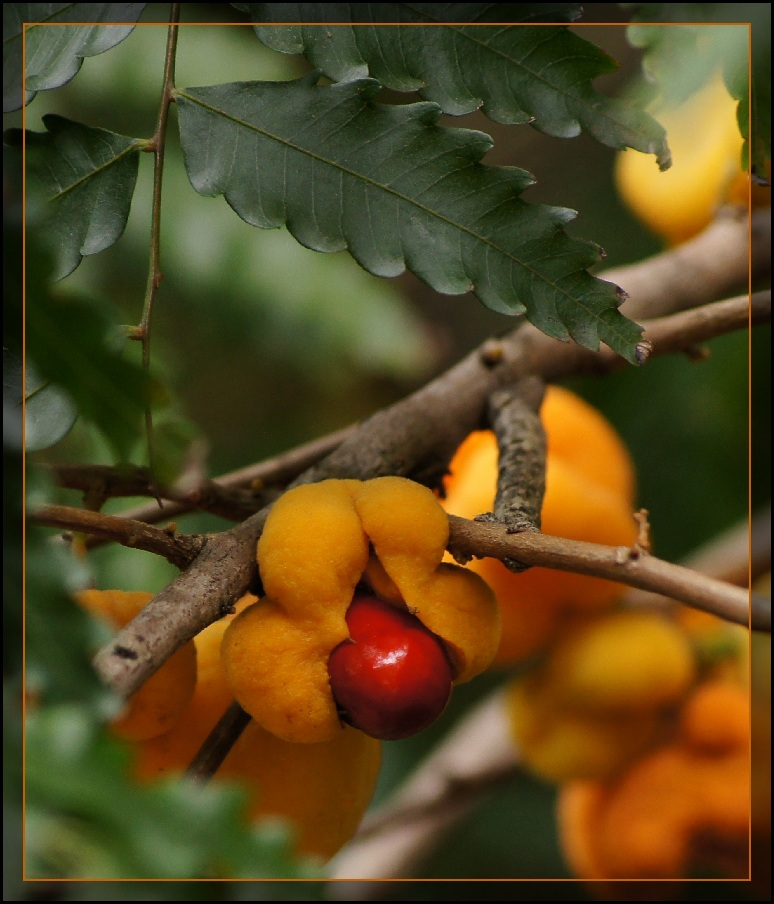

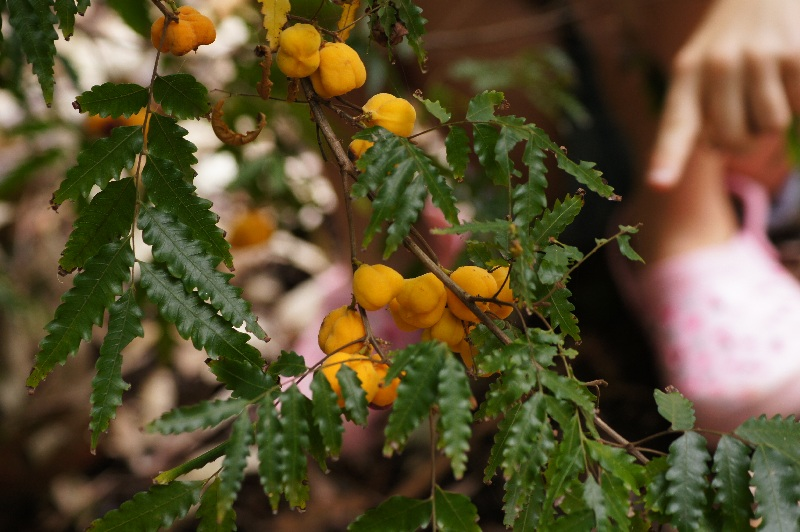

Scientific classification
- Kingdom: Plantae
- Clade: Tracheophytes
- Clade: Angiosperms
- Clade: Eudicots
- Clade: Rosids
- Order: Sapindales
- Family: Sapindaceae
- Tribe: Cupanieae
- Genus: Sarcotoechia; Radlk.

Species
- See text

= Sarcotoechia =

Genus of trees

Sarcotoechia is a genus of trees in the lychee family Sapindaceae, endemic to New Guinea, Maluku and tropical Queensland. Ten species have been described, two of which are disputed.

== Species ==
As of July 2025, the following eight species are accepted by Plants of the World Online (POWO), Catalogue of Life (COL) and Global Biodiversity Information Facility (GBIF):

- Sarcotoechia angulata Leenh.
- Sarcotoechia apetala Leenh.
- Sarcotoechia bilocularis Leenh.
- Sarcotoechia cuneata Radlk.
- Sarcotoechia lanceolata (C.T.White) S.T.Reynolds
- Sarcotoechia planitiei Leenh.
- Sarcotoechia protracta Radlk.
- Sarcotoechia villosa S.T.Reynolds

At the same time, two additional taxa are accepted by World Flora Online, but not by POWO, COL or GBIF:

- Sarcotoechia heterophylla S.T.Reynolds
- Sarcotoechia serrata S.T.Reynolds
