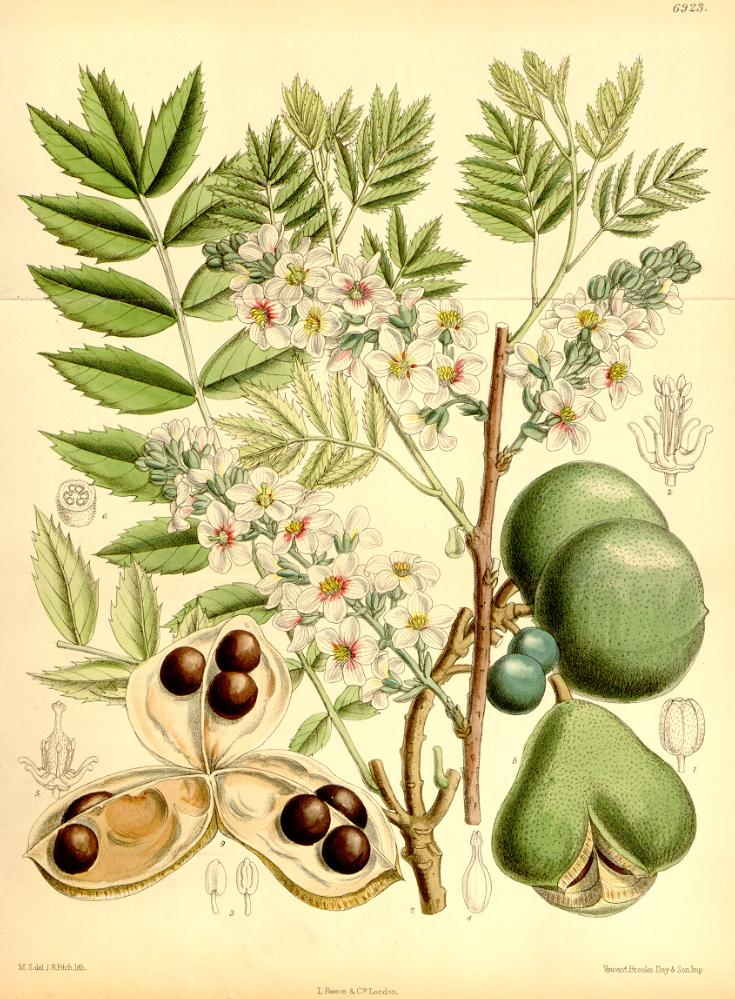
- 1887 illustration

Scientific classification
- Kingdom: Plantae
- Clade: Tracheophytes
- Clade: Angiosperms
- Clade: Eudicots
- Clade: Rosids
- Order: Sapindales
- Family: Sapindaceae
- Subfamily: Xanthoceroideae
- Genus: Xanthoceras; Bunge
- Species: X. sorbifolium

Binomial name
- Xanthoceras sorbifolium Bunge

= Xanthoceras =

Genus of soapberry plant

Xanthoceras sorbifolium, the yellowhorn, shiny leaf yellowhorn, goldenhorn, or Chinese flowering chestnut, is a woody oil tree species in the family Sapindaceae, and the only species in the genus Xanthoceras. It is native to northern China in the provinces of Gansu, Hebei, Henan, Liaoning, Nei Monggol, Ningxia, Shaanxi, and Shandong. It is also cultivated in Russia, having been imported there since the 19th Century. The genus name Xanthoceras (which translates as "yellow horn") is considered to be the most basal member of the family Sapindaceae. The specific epithet sorbifolium refers to the leaves, which resemble those of the distantly related rowans (Sorbus). It was originally spelled sorbifolia, but this is a grammatical error that was corrected to sorbifolium under the ICBN. X. sorbifolium is an ancient tree species. It is said it can live up to 2,000 years. It is a sacred tree planted in temples in northern China, because there is no Ficus religiosa in the north. It is also used in traditional Chinese, Mongolian and Tibetan medicine. In Bencao Gangmu, it is called '天仙果 (Heavenly Fairy Fruit)'. Tenacious X. sorbifolium can grow in snow and drought like in the Gobi Desert. It has very high alimentaire value, medicinal value, ornamental value and ecological value. In cultivation in the UK, X. sorbifolium has gained the Royal Horticultural Society's Award of Garden Merit.

== Description ==
It is a large deciduous shrub or small tree growing to 8 m tall. The leaves are arranged alternately, 12–30 cm long, and are pinnate, with 9–17 leaflets, the leaflets 3–6 cm long, with a sharply serrated margin. The flowers are 2–3 cm in diameter, with five white petals, and are produced in erect panicles 10–20 cm long in mid spring. The fruit is an oval leathery capsule 5–6 cm diameter, which splits into three sections at maturity to release the 6–18 seeds; the seeds are black, 1.5 cm in diameter, resembling a small horse chestnut seed. The shells of the fruits and seeds are very hard, so that they are best protected during the growth process. Generally, X. sorbifolium only blooms white flowers. In the process of multiple crosses performed by the '西北文冠果基地/Northwest X. sorbifolium base' ("using 56 seeds of X.sorbifolium from all over the country to make them natural hybrids, in order to increase fruit yield"), unexpectedly, the flower color also changed from single to multiple.

== Uses ==
- The leaves, flowers, and seeds of yellowhorn are all edible. "Both the pulp and the kernel can be eaten raw or used as an ingredient for cooking". "The kernels taste like chestnuts". "Both are nutritious". "Ripe seeds can produce protein drinks".X.sorbifolium has "a long flowering period, fragrant flowers, large nectar content, and rich reducing sugar, it is a high-quality nectar source in early spring in the north" of China. It is worthwhile for beekeepers to produce honey with a special flavor. According to medical research papers on X. sorbifolium in the United States and China, "the fruit peel extract can inhibit the cells of ovary cancer, cervical cancer and Melanoma". The husk has two major values: "the raw material of furfural, which has a wide range of industrial uses", and "the raw material for medicines for treating urinary system diseases".
- The oil content of the seeds is 40%, and the oil content of the kernels is 66.8%. The unsaturated fat of oil is as high as 94%. "Its saturated fat content is 1.78 times lower than that of olive oil and 1.9 times lower than that of peanut oil". "Its quality is better than peanut oil and sesame oil, and its health care effect is also unmatched by salad oil and olive oil". X. sorbifolium oil is rich in nervonic acid (2.6%~5%), according to a medical research report in Shanghai, "after taking X. sorbifolium oil for 3 months, stroke sequelae, Alzheimer's disease, Parkinson's disease, cerebral palsy, cerebral atrophy, head injury, memory loss and other encephalopathy have an average effective rate of 92.8%". In addition, "the average tumor inhibition rate of X. sorbifolium oil on S180 is 82.94%, which is equivalent to the tumor inhibition effect of cyclophosphamide, but without the toxin of cyclophosphamide". The "meal" after oil extraction is rich in protein, and "can be used as high-protein food, animal feed, or extract hydrolyzed protein and amino acid". "Amino acids extracted from X. sorbifolium are complete essential amino acid". "The nutritional value and absorption rate of X.sorbifolium protein are higher than soy protein and sunflower seed protein, close to casein".
- "Branches and trunk are effective medicines for treating rheumatism". The leaves can be used to make tea, "which can diuresis, remove rheumatism, and lower blood pressure". It also has "the effects of sterilization, anti-inflammatory, reducing fat, anti-oxidation"... etc. "The leaves contain 19.18% to 23% protein, which is higher than that of black tea, and the caffeine content is close to that of scented tea".

== "One thousand flowers one fruit" ==
X. sorbifolium has a long history and is distributed in a wide area, but few people knew about it. In 2000, no information about it could be found on the Internet. At this time, Ma Chengfu (马成福), a reporter who will be hailed as the "pioneer of the X. sorbifolium industry", began work on popularizing the species. His works "《流血的石羊河 /The Bleeding Shiyang River" and "《只有和谐是良药》/Only Harmony Is the Best Medicine" have been compiled into college textbooks. Ma Chengfu was born in August 1968 in a poor farmer's family in Jingtai County, Gansu. Jingtai is located at the eastern end of the Hexi Corridor and south of the Tengger Desert. Since childhood, he suffered from drought, water shortage, and sandstorm in the desert climate, prompting him to find a tree species that can improve the ecological environment of his hometown and create economic benefits at the same time. To this end, he traveled all over the Hexi Corridor. During a visit in 2000, at the edge of the barren Tengger Desert, Ma suddenly saw some trees that grow well and bear fruit (at the time he did not know they were X. sorbifolium), which immediately raised his confidence again. Since then, he has embarked on a long journey of R&D and entrepreneurship of X. sorbifolium without fear of hardships. Two main reasons exist for why X. sorbifolium has not been developed into a commercial crop in the past: "difficulty in transplanting and low fruiting rate". "千花一果/One thousand flowers one fruit" should be a pity for it in the past. After repeated failures, Ma solved these two problems and developed the high-yield and high-quality X. sorbifolium. The X. sorbifolium seedlings cultivated by Ma's team-'西北文冠果基地/Northwest X. sorbifolium base' "have gone out of Gansu, spread to Northwest, Northeast, and North China, and introduced to Sichuan, Jiangsu, Hubei and other southern regions".

In the past two decades, X. sorbifolium has also attracted other R&D teams. For example, in Qiu County, Hebei, the planting area in 2018 has reached several thousand "亩/666.67m2". China's first X. sorbifolium research and development, processing, and sales enterprise also appeared in Qiu County, and achieved a multi-win situation of ecological, economic, and social benefits. In April 2021, the "X. sorbifolium Industry Development and Medicinal Value Summit Forum" was held in Qiu County, expecting to attract more entrepreneurs to develop the economic value and medicinal value of X. sorbifolium, and create an industry-university-research cooperation platform to promote scientific research and innovation achievements.

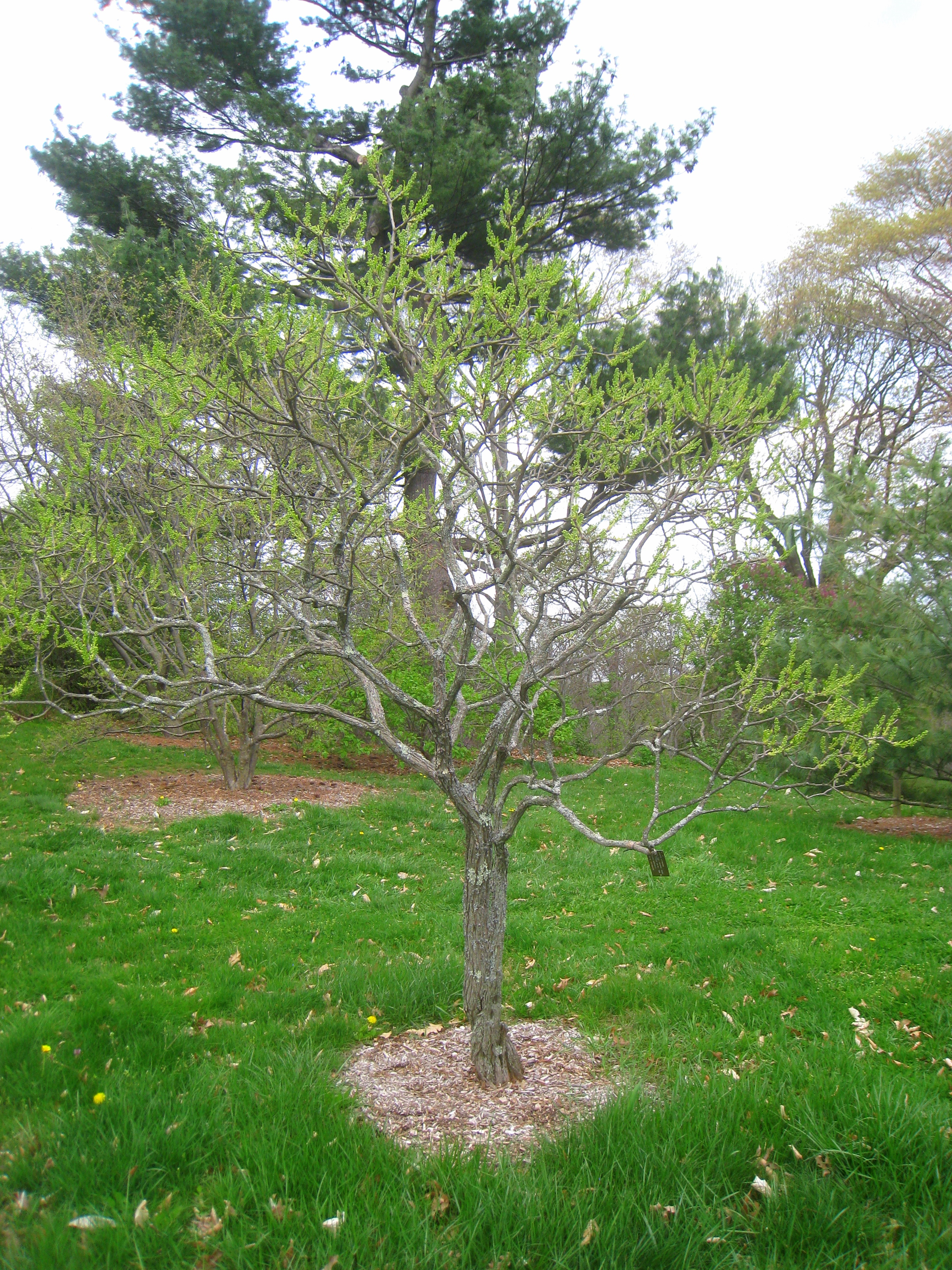

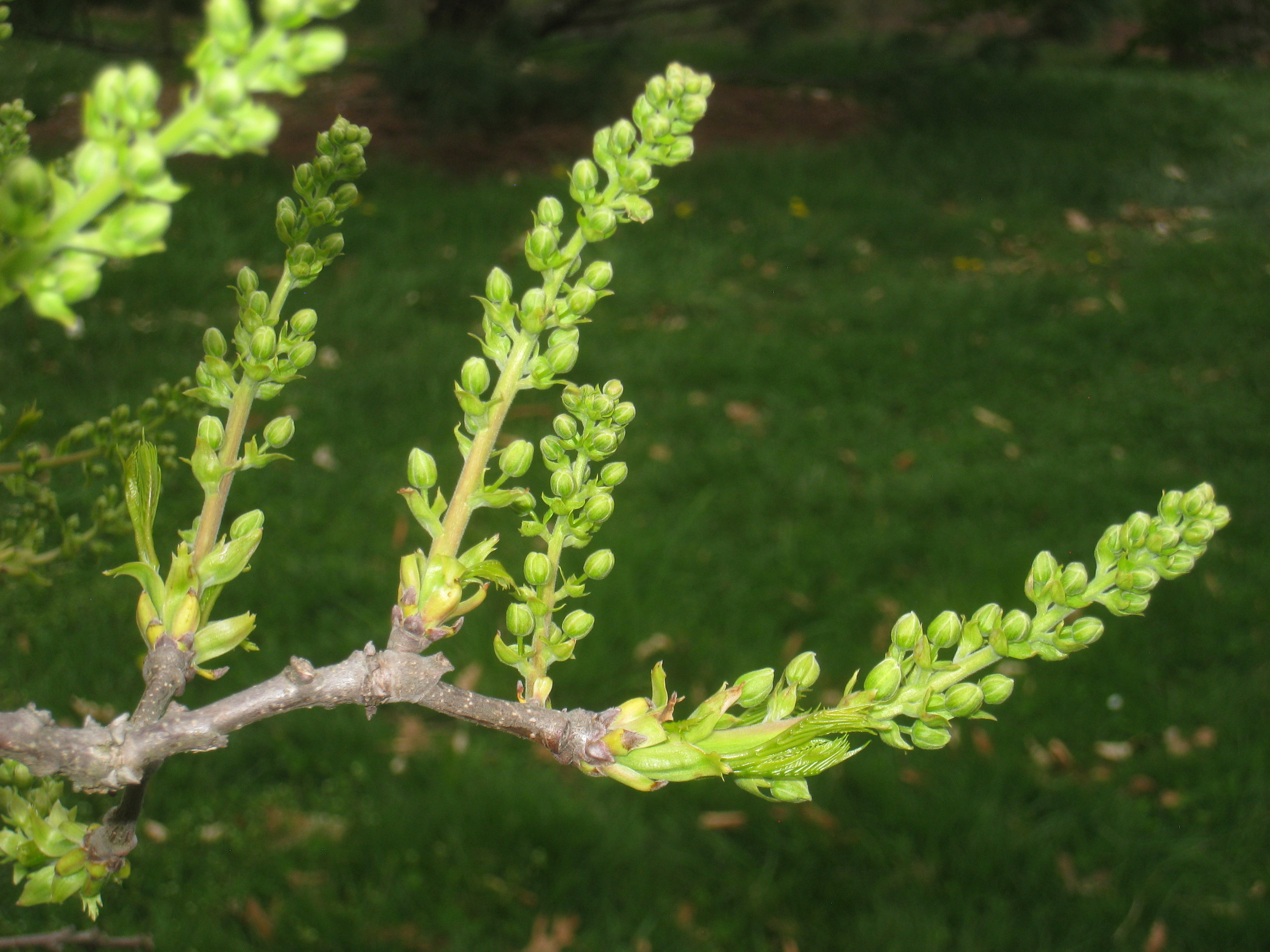

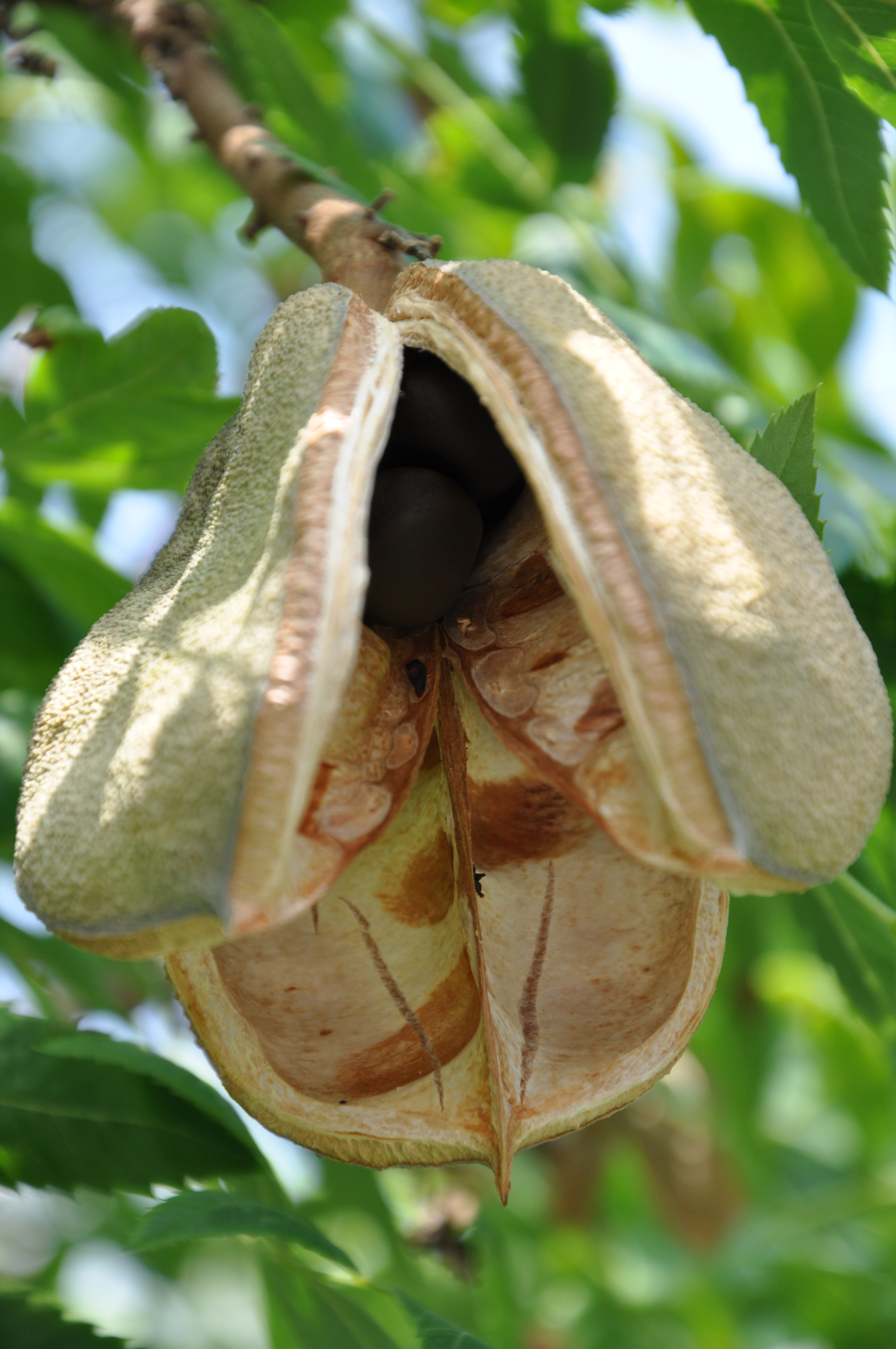
