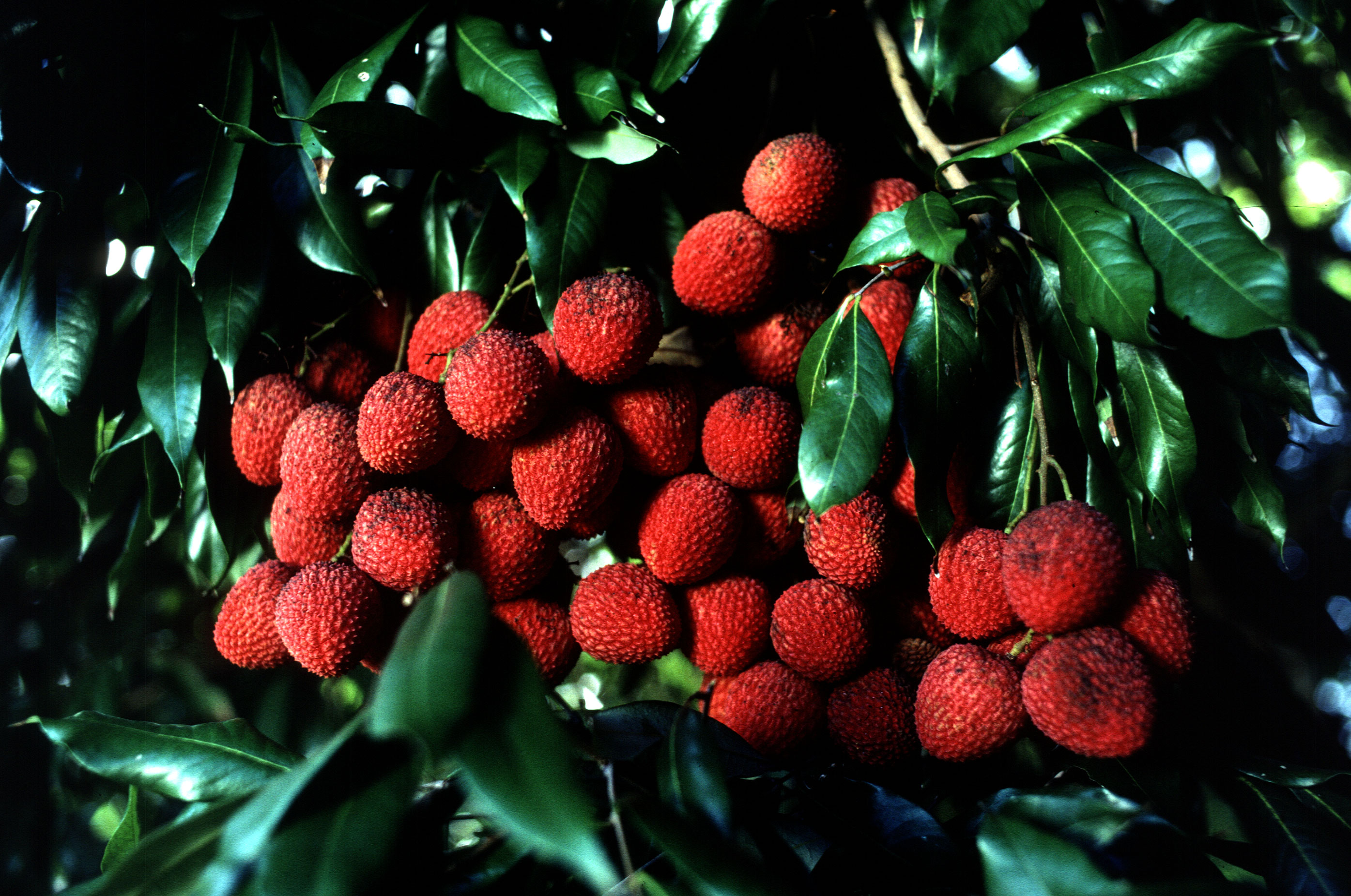
- Litchi chinensis leaves and fruit

Scientific classification
- Kingdom: Plantae
- Clade: Tracheophytes
- Clade: Angiosperms
- Clade: Eudicots
- Clade: Rosids
- Order: Sapindales
- Family: Sapindaceae; Juss.

Subfamilies
- Dodonaeoideae; Hippocastanoideae; Sapindoideae; Xanthoceroideae

Diversity
- 1,900+ species in ca. 140 genera
- The range of Sapindaceae

= Sapindaceae =

Family of flowering plants

The Sapindaceae are a family of flowering plants in the order Sapindales known as the soapberry family. It contains 138 genera and 1,858 accepted species. Examples include horse chestnut, maples, ackee and lychee.

The Sapindaceae occur in temperate to tropical regions, many in laurel forest habitat, throughout the world. Many are laticiferous, i.e. they contain latex, a milky sap, and many contain mildly toxic saponins. The largest genera are Serjania, Paullinia, Allophylus and Acer.

== Description ==
Plants of this family have habits ranging from trees to herbaceous plants to lianas. The leaves of the tropical genera are usually spirally alternate, while those of the temperate maples (Acer), Aesculus, and a few other genera are opposite. They are most often pinnately compound, but are palmately compound in Aesculus, and simply palmate in Acer. The petiole has a swollen base and lacks stipules.

The flowers are small and unisexual, or functionally unisexual, though plants may be either dioecious or monoecious. They are usually found in cymes grouped in panicles. They most often have four or five petals and sepals (petals are absent in Dodonaea). The stamens range from four to 10, usually on a nectar disc between the petals and stamens, their filaments are often hairy. The most frequent number is eight, in two rings of four. The gynoecium contains two or three carpels, sometimes up to six. The usually single style has a lobed stigma. Most often they are pollinated by birds or insects, with a few species pollinated by wind.

Ripe fruits may be fleshy or dry. They may be nuts, berries, drupes, schizocarps, capsules (Bridgesia), or samaras (Acer). The embryos are bent or coiled, without endosperm in the seed, and frequently with an aril.

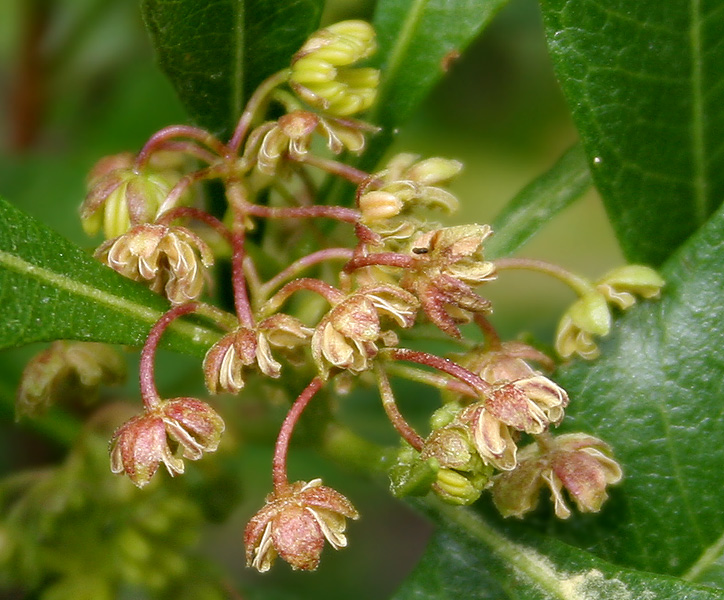
Dodonaea viscosa flowers

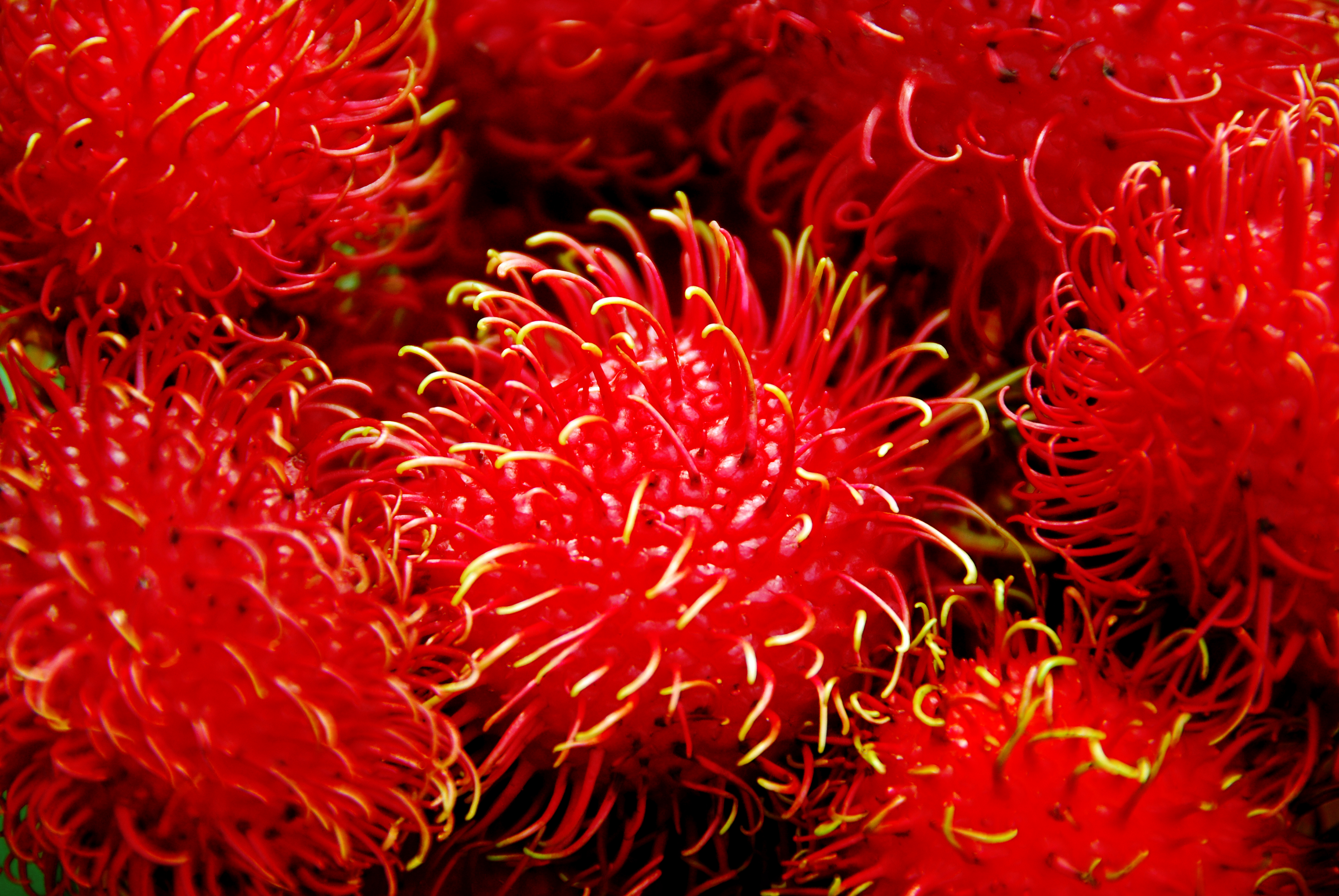
Rambutan (Nephelium lappaceum) fruits

== Classification ==
The Sapindaceae are related to the Rutaceae, and both are usually placed in an order Sapindales or Rutales, depending on whether they are kept separate and which name is used for the order. The most basal member appears to be Xanthoceras. Some authors formerly maintained some or all of Hippocastanaceae and Aceraceae, however this resulted in paraphyly. The former Ptaeroxylaceae, now placed in Rutaceae, were sometimes placed in Sapindaceae. The family is divided into four subfamilies, Dodonaeoideae (about 38 genera), Sapindoideae (about 114 genera), Hippocastanoideae (5 genera) and Xanthoceroideae (1 genus). The largest genera are Serjania (about 220 species), Paullinia (about 180 species), and Allophylus (about 200 species) in the tropical Sapindoideae and Acer (about 110 species) in the temperate Hippocastanoideae.

The largely temperate genera formerly separated in the families Aceraceae (Acer, Dipteronia) and Hippocastanaceae (Aesculus, Billia, Handeliodendron) were included within a more broadly circumscribed Sapindaceae by the Angiosperm Phylogeny Group. Recent research has confirmed the inclusion of these genera in the Sapindaceae.

== Economically valuable species ==
The Sapindaceae include many species of economically valuable tropical fruit, including the lychee, longan, pitomba, guinip/mamoncillo, korlan, rambutan, pulasan, and ackee. Other products include guaraná, soapberries, and maple syrup.

Some species of maple and buckeye are valued for their wood, while several other genera, such as Koelreuteria, Cardiospermum, and Ungnadia, are popular ornamentals. Schleichera trijuga is the source of Indian macassar oil. Saponins extracted from the drupe of Sapindus species are effective surfactants and are used commercially in cosmetics and detergents.

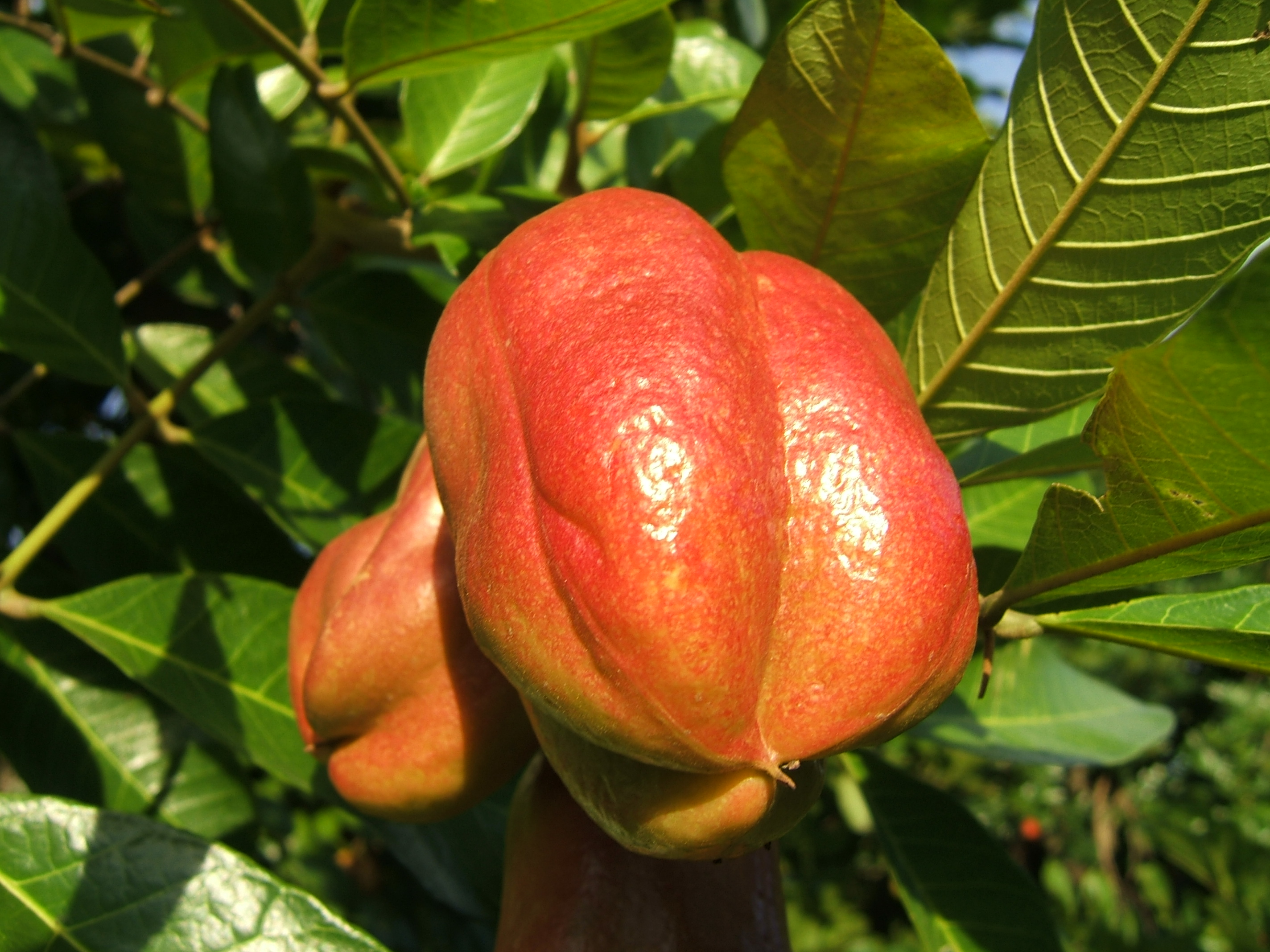
Ackee (Blighia sapida) fruit

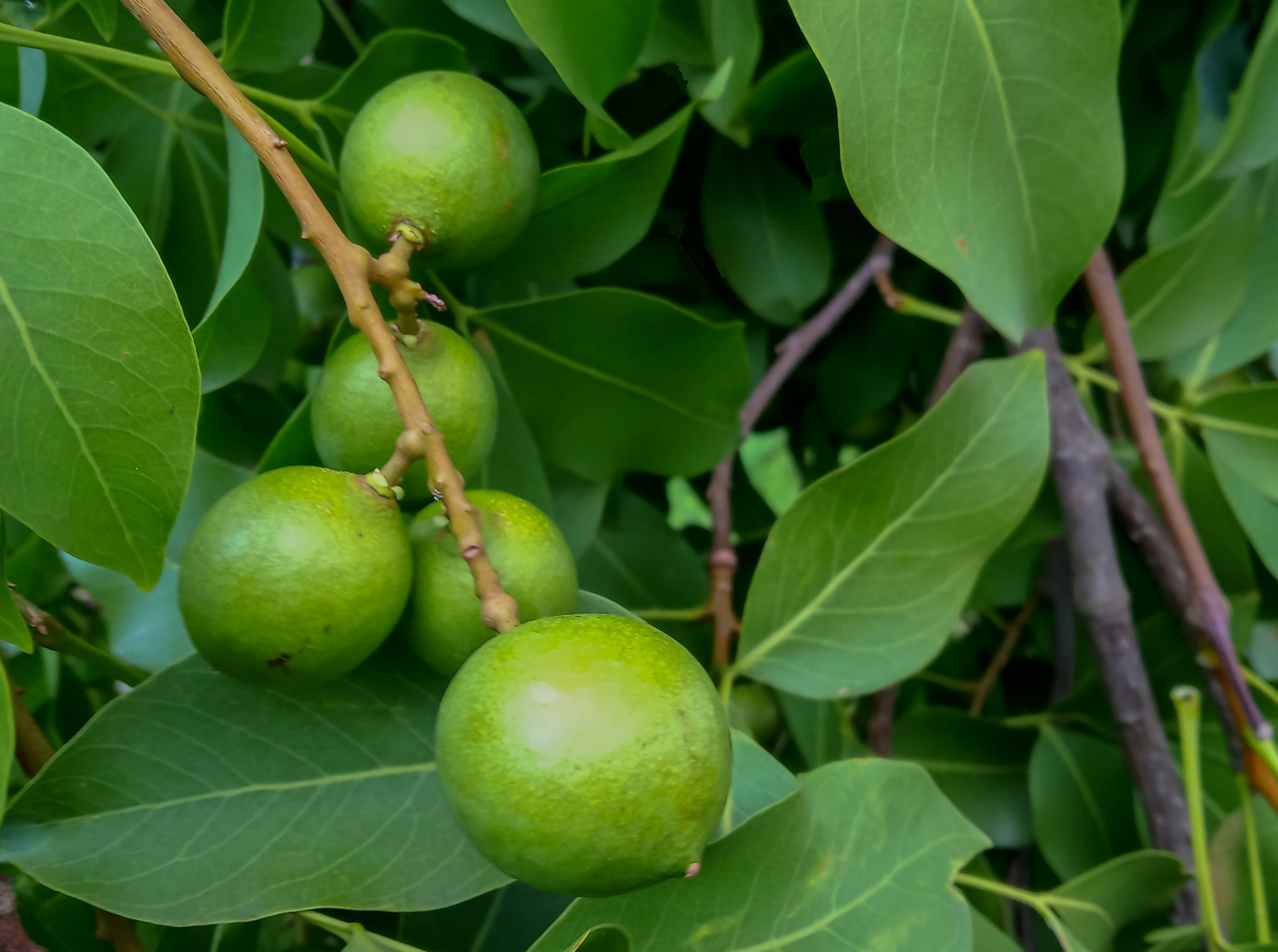
Guinep/ Mamoncillo (Melicoccus bijugatus) fruit

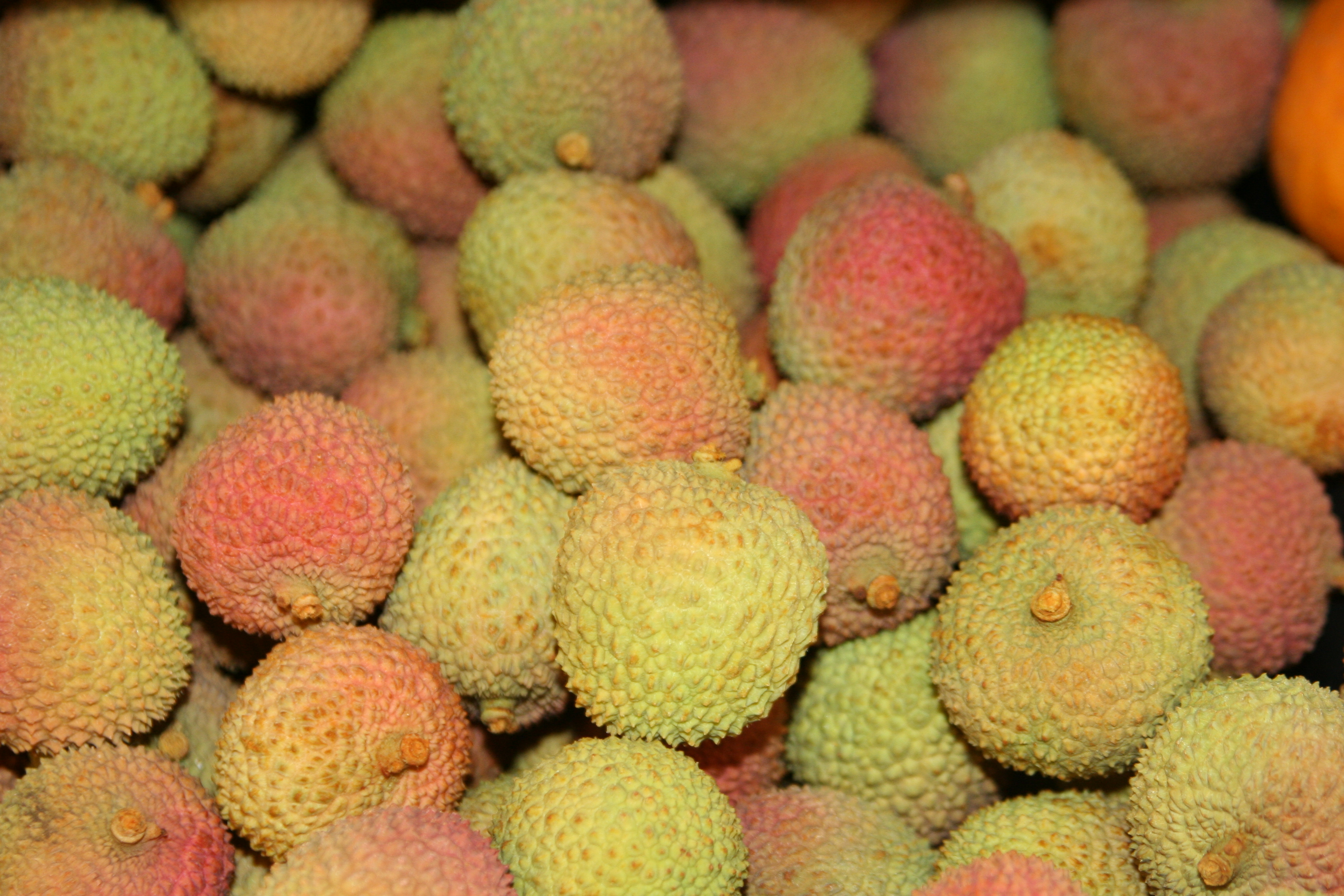
Lychee (Litchi chinensis) fruit

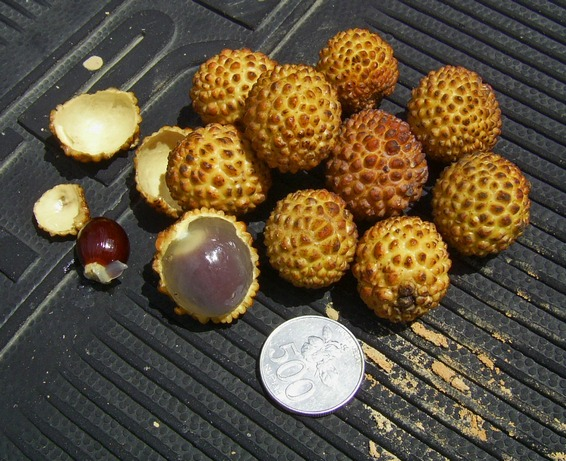
Alupag (Dimocarpus didyma) fruits

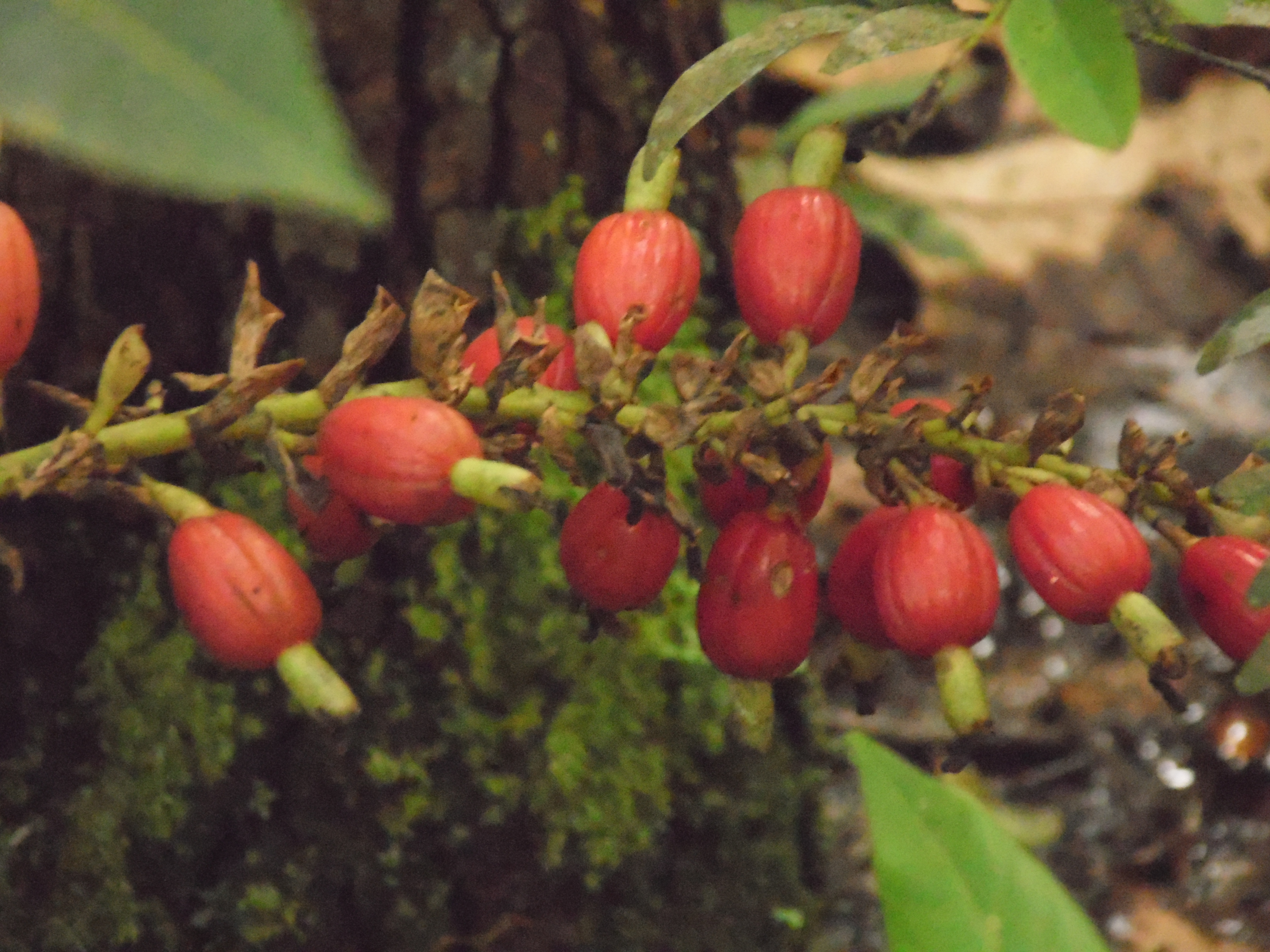
Guaraná (Paullinia cupana) fruit

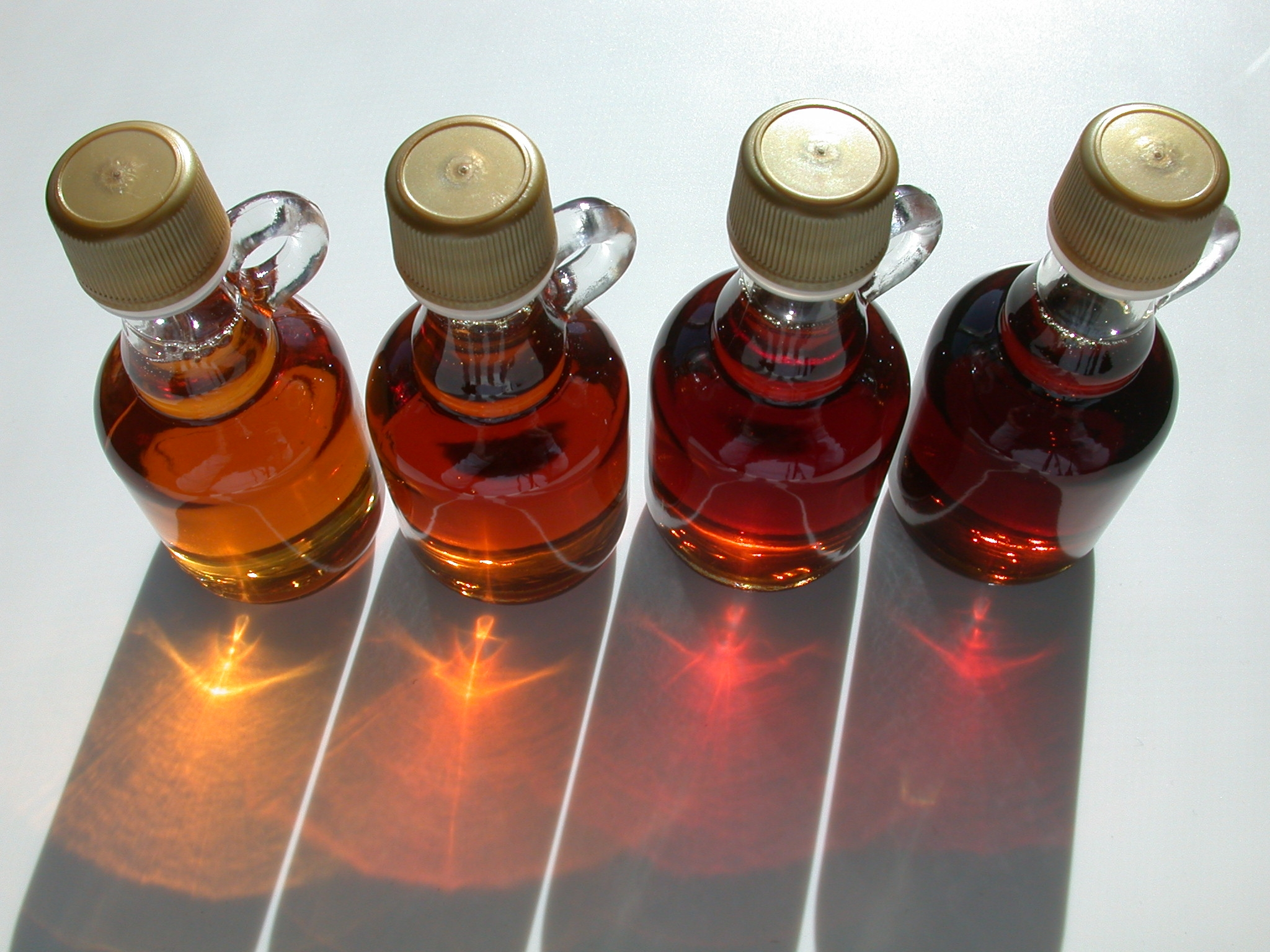
Maple syrup (from Acer saccharum)
