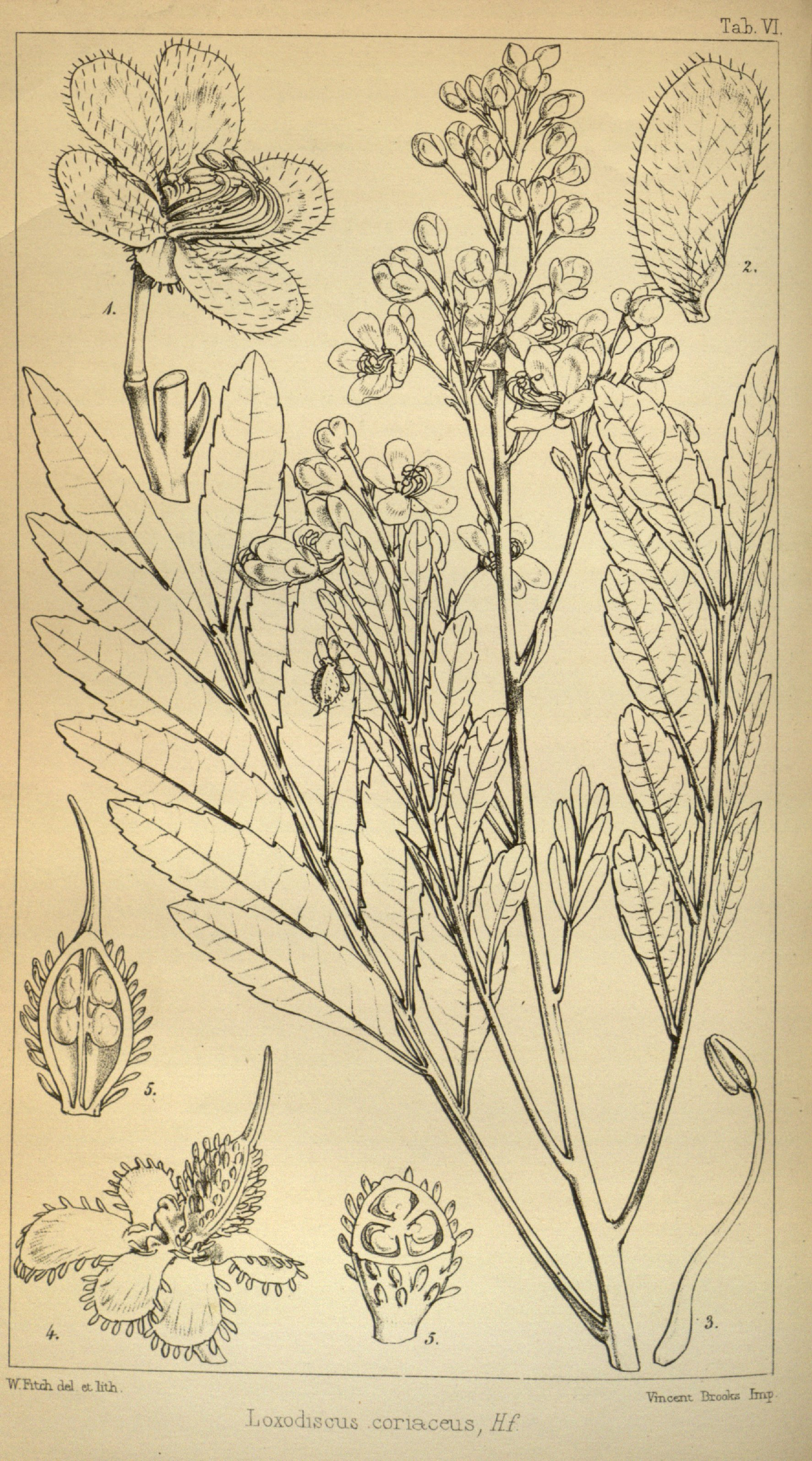
- Loxodiscus coriaceous

Scientific classification
- Kingdom: Plantae
- Clade: Tracheophytes
- Clade: Angiosperms
- Clade: Eudicots
- Clade: Rosids
- Order: Sapindales
- Family: Sapindaceae
- Subfamily: Dodonaeoideae
- Genus: Loxodiscus; Hook f.
- Species: L. coriaceus

Binomial name
- Loxodiscus coriaceus Hook.f

= Loxodiscus =

Genus of shrubs

Loxodiscus coriaceus is a species of shrubs in the family Sapindaceae. It is endemic to New Caledonia and the only species of the genus Loxodiscus. Its closest relatives are Cossinia, Diplopeltis, Dodonaea and Harpullia.
