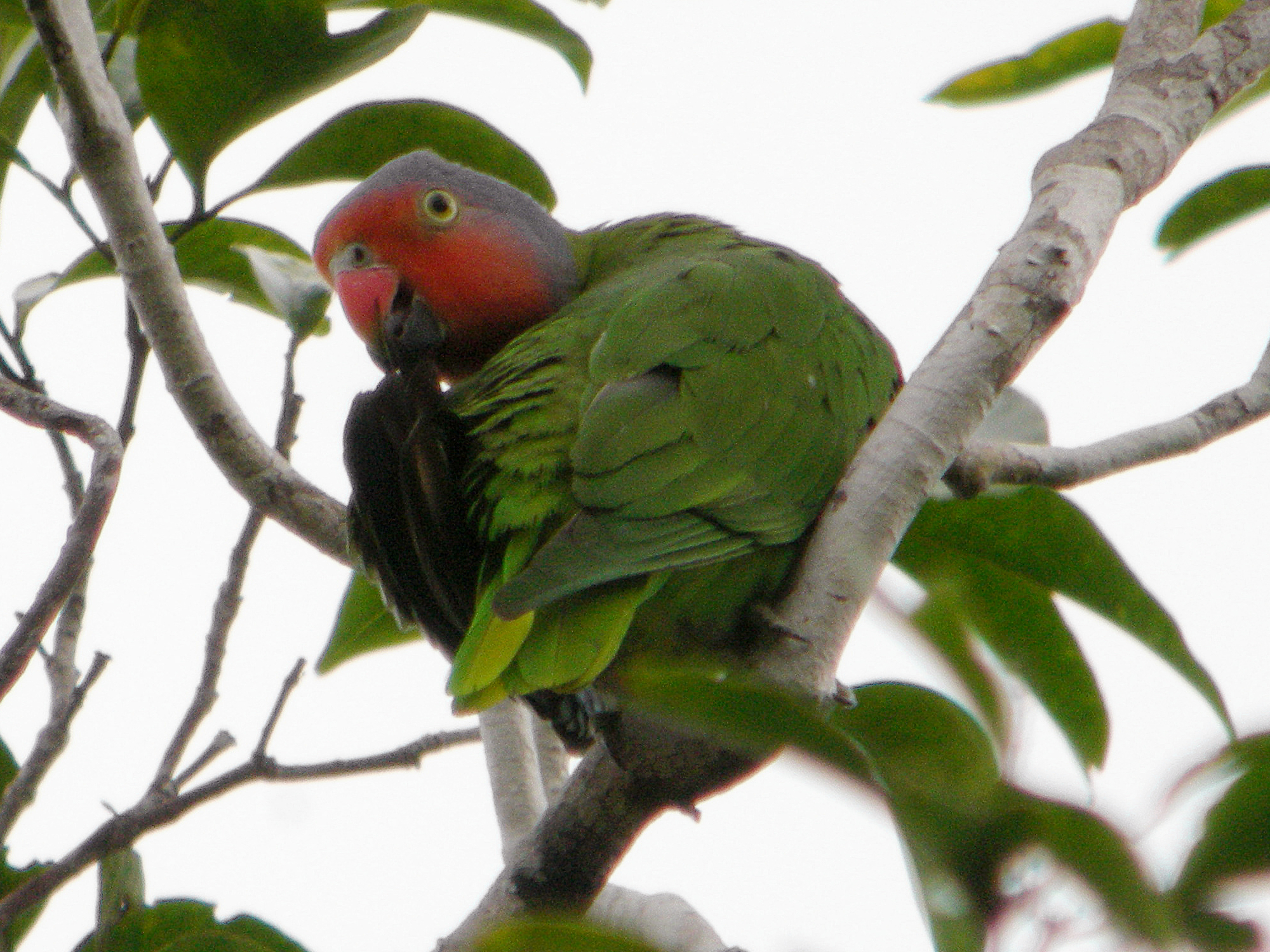
- Male in Papua New Guinea

Conservation status
- Least Concern (IUCN 3.1)

Scientific classification
- Kingdom: Animalia
- Phylum: Chordata
- Class: Aves
- Order: Psittaciformes
- Family: Psittaculidae
- Genus: Geoffroyus
- Species: G. geoffroyi

Binomial name
- Geoffroyus geoffroyi (Bechstein, 1811)

= Red-cheeked parrot =

Species of bird

The red-cheeked parrot (Geoffroyus geoffroyi) is a species of parrot in the family Psittaculidae found in Indonesia, Papua New Guinea and the tip of northern Queensland, Australia. There are 17 subspecies currently recognized. It is a stocky short-tailed parrot with predominantly green plumage. It exhibits sexual dimorphism; the adult male has red cheeks and a mauve nape and top of head, while the female is duller with a brown head.

== Taxonomy ==
The red-cheeked parrot was first described by the German naturalist Johann Matthäus Bechstein, 1811. It is one of three species classified in the genus Geoffroyus. This genus has occasionally been merged into Psittinus. Proposed races sumbavensis and tjindanae are synonyms of floresianus; stresemanni of rhodops; explorator too may be synonymous with rhodops.

=== Subspecies ===
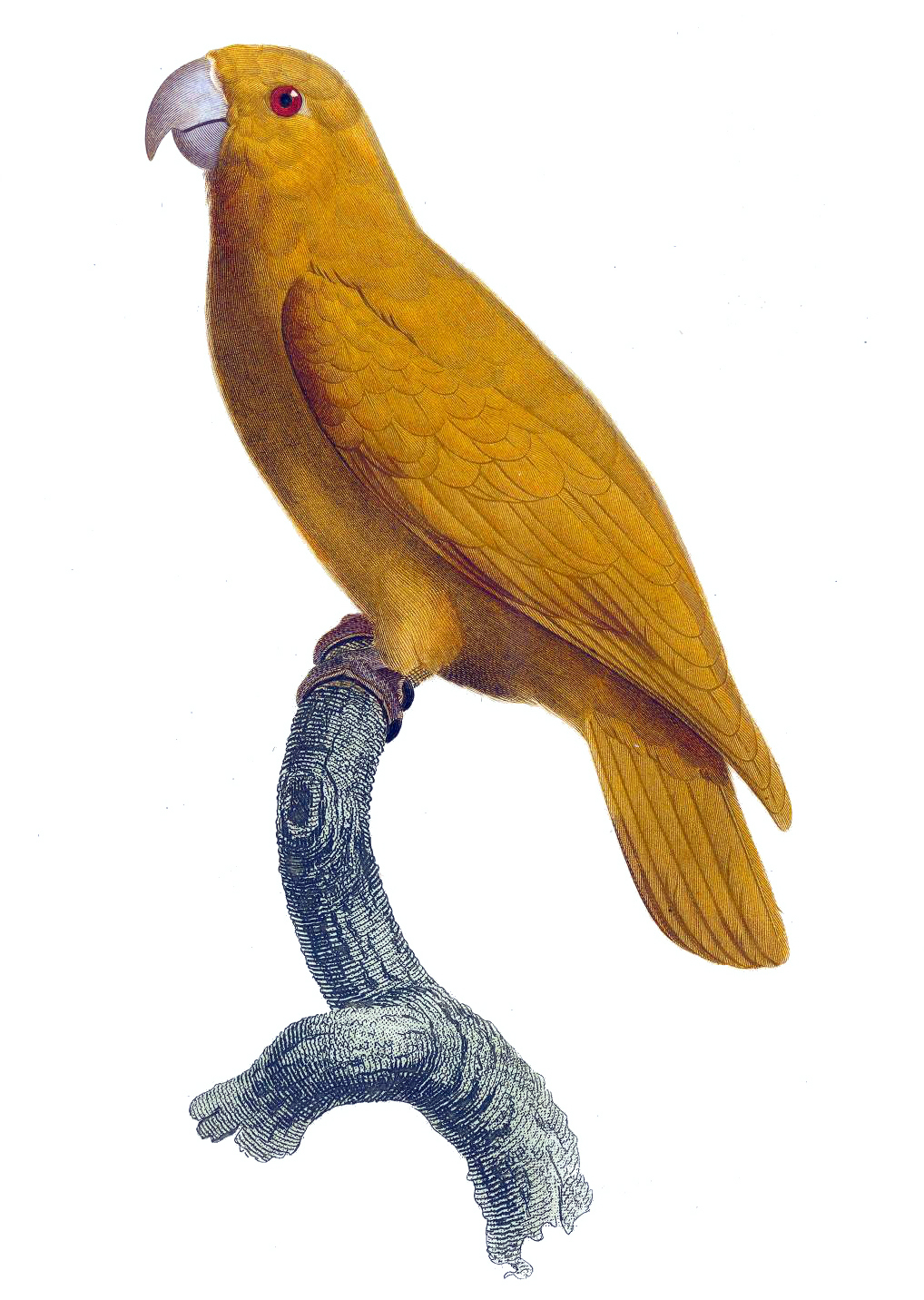
Possibly extinct variety, G. g. aureus

Seventeen subspecies of the red-cheeked parrot are now recognized.

- G. g. cyanicollis (Müller, 1841) North Moluccas
- G. g. obiensis (Finsch, 1868) Obi Islands, North-central Moluccas
- G. g. rhodops (Schlegel), 1864 South Moluccas
- G. g. explorator Hartert, 1901 Seram Laut Island (SE of Seram Island)
- G. g. keyensis Finsch, 1868 Kai Islands
- G. g. floresianus Salvadori, 1891 West Lesser Sunda Islands
- G. g. geoffroyi (Bechstein, 1811) is the nominate subspecies and is found on the East Lesser Sunda Islands
- G. g. timorlaoensis Meyer, 1884 Tanimbar Islands
- G. g. pucherani Souancé, 1856 West Papuan Islands and Northwest New Guinea
- G. g. minor Neumann, 1922 North New Guinea
- G. g. jobiensis (Meyer, 1874) Yapen Island and Mios Num Island, Geelvink Bay
- G. g. mysoriensis (Meyer, 1874) Biak and Numfor, Geelvink Bay
- G. g. orientalis Meyer, 1891 Huon Peninsula of northeastern New Guinea. It is possibly not distinct from aruensis; The male's crown is slightly paler.
- G. g. sudestiensis De Vis, 1890 Misima Island and Tagula in Louisiade Archipelago
- G. g. cyanicarpus Hartert, 1899 Rossel Island in Louisiade Archipelago
- G. g. aruensis (Gray, 1858) Aru Islands, South New Guinea, East Papuan islands
- G. g. maclennani (MacGillivray, 1913) extreme North Queensland

== Description ==
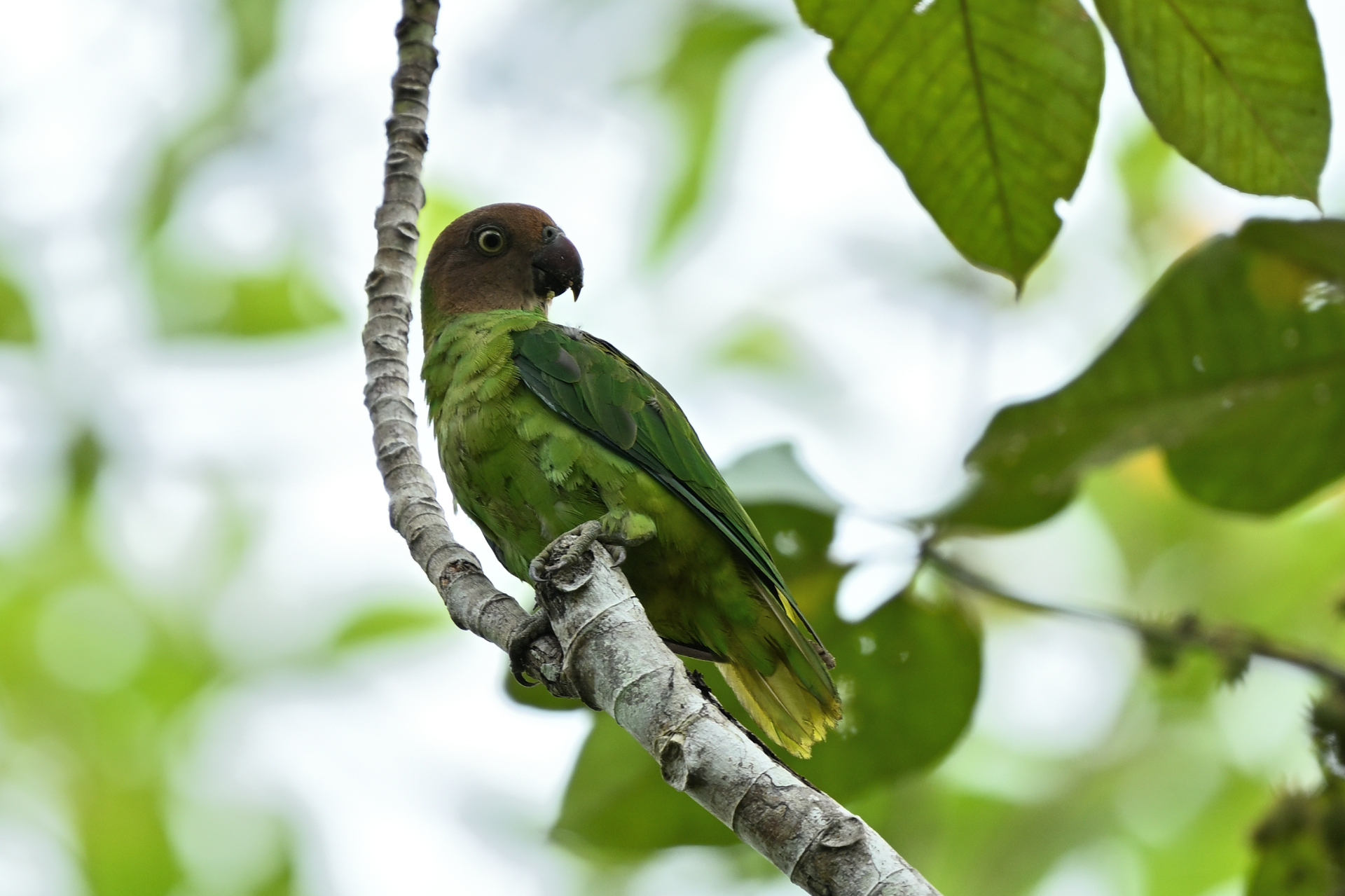
Red-cheeked parrot (female) from Nimbokrang

Both the male and female red-cheeked parrot have predominantly bright green plumage and a stocky body with a short tail. The adult male has pink-tinged red cheeks and face with a blue-mauve back of head and crown, chestnut wing coverts, blue under wing, and a coral-pink upper mandible. The female has a brown head and more olive-brown cheeks and throat, and all brown-grey bill. Juveniles also have the olive tinge, but their heads are more green. All red-cheeked parrots have yellow eyes. Their beaks are designed for eating seeds and fruit. Their swift and direct flight pattern is distinct and similar to that of a starling. Their call is "metallic". Typical body dimensions are: height 250 mm (9.8 in), length 203 mm (8.0 in), and wing span 135 to 155 mm (5.3–6.1 in).

== Distribution and habitat ==
The red-cheeked parrot is found in Cape York Peninsula, Australia, Indonesia, East Timor, and Papua New Guinea and several other islands in the region. Its natural habitats are subtropical or tropical dry forests, subtropical or tropical moist lowland forests, and subtropical or tropical mangrove forests. They live along streams and in forests.

== Behaviour ==
Red-cheeked parrots usually live in pairs, and small family groups outside of the breeding season. During the breeding season the birds are usually found in pairs but there is little else known of their courtship behavior in the wild. They are usually quite shy, except while feeding. When feeding they gather in large groups, and they are very noisy and conspicuous. They only walk short distances as their feet are not structured for walking, but for perching. They forage for food and their diet consists of seeds, fruits (mainly figs), blossoms, and nectar. Fruit and seeds of Corymbia papuana, Casuarina papuana and scaly ash (Ganophyllum falcatum) are among those recorded as diet items. During the breeding season the female bird excavates its nest in a rotting tree limb. A clutch usually contains three eggs.

== Conservation status ==
The species has a large range. There is an unknown number of individuals, but their numbers are thought to be stable. Their conservation status is classified as Least Concern by the IUCN.
