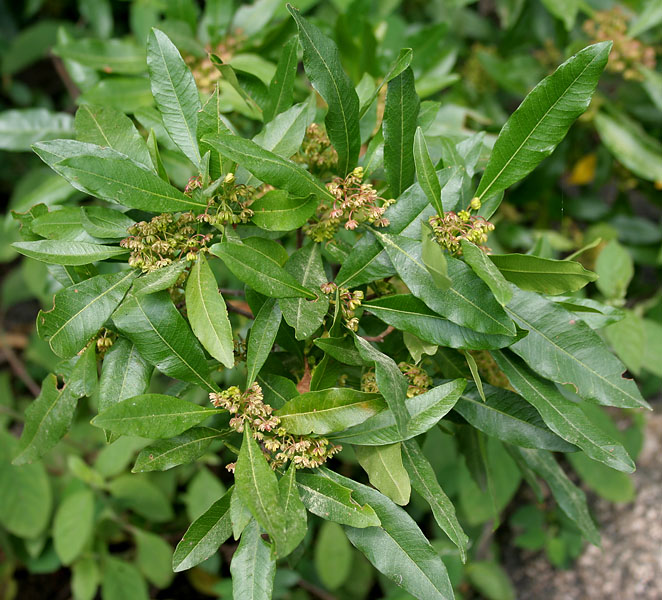
- Dodonaea viscosa in Keesara, Rangareddy district, Andhra Pradesh, India.

Scientific classification
- Kingdom: Plantae
- Clade: Tracheophytes
- Clade: Angiosperms
- Clade: Eudicots
- Clade: Rosids
- Order: Sapindales
- Family: Sapindaceae
- Subfamily: Dodonaeoideae; Burnett

Genera
- See text

= Dodonaeoideae =

Dodonaeoideae Temporal range: Santonian–present

Subfamily of flowering plants

Dodonaeoideae is a subfamily of flowering plants in the soapberry family, Sapindaceae.

The subfamily includes 24 genera in two tribes, Dodonaeae and Doratoxyleae.

A single fossil genus, †Alatacarpus Greller et Goudket, is known from the Late Cretaceous (Santonian)-aged Magothy Formation from Long Island, New York. The specimen consists of a fossil fruit similar to that of Dodonaea.

== Tribe Dodonaeae ==
(Kunth) DC. (1824). Type genus: Dodonaea Mill.

- Arfeuillea Radlkofer (1 Species; Thailand and Laos)
- Averrhoidium Baill. (4 Species; Mexico, Tropical South America)
- Boniodendron Gagnep. (2; southern China and Vietnam)
- Conchopetalum Radlk. (2; Madagascar)
- Cossinia Comm. ex Lam. (3; Mauritius, New Caledonia)
- Diplokeleba N.E.Br. (2; South America)
- Diplopeltis Endl. (5; Australia)
- Dodonaea Mill. (60+; Pantropical)
- Euchorium Ekman & Radlk. (1 species; Cuba)
- Euphorianthus Radlk. (1; Eastern Malesia)
- Harpullia Roxb. (26; India and China to Australasia)
- Hirania Thulin (1; Somalia)
- Llagunoa Ruiz & Pav. (3-4; Andes)
- Loxodiscus Hook.f. (1; New Caledonia)
- Magonia A.St.-Hil. (1; Brazil, Bolivia, Paraguay)
- Majidea J.Kirk ex Oliv.(4-5; Africa and Madagascar)

== Tribe Doratoxyleae ==
Radlk. 1890. Type genus: Doratoxylon Thouars ex Hook.f.

- Doratoxylon Thouars ex Hook.f. (6 species; Mauritius, Madagascar)
- Exothea Macfad. (3; West Indies, Central America)
- Filicium Thwaites ex Benth. (3-4; Madagascar, East Africa to India, Sri Lanka)
- Ganophyllum Blume (1-2; Paleotropics)
- Hippobromus Eckl. & Zeyh. (1; Africa)
- Hypelate P.Browne (1; West Indies, Florida)
- Smelophyllum Radlk. (1; Cape Provinces of South Africa)
- Zanha Hiern (23; Southern Africa, Madagascar)
