= Rennell parrot =

Rennel parrot

Conservation status
- Least Concern (IUCN 3.1)

Scientific classification
- Kingdom: Animalia
- Phylum: Chordata
- Class: Aves
- Order: Psittaciformes
- Family: Psittaculidae
- Genus: Geoffroyus
- Species: G. hyacinthinus

Binomial name
- Geoffroyus hyacinthinus (Mayr, 1931)

Synonyms
- Geoffroyus heteroclitus hyacinthinus

Species of bird

The Rennell parrot (Geoffroyus hyacinthinus) is an island species of parrot, found on Rennell Island in the Solomons. It is normally considered a subspecies of the song parrot (Geoffroyus heteroclitus) but differs from it in its larger size, its blue collar being more lavender in colour and extending to the breast, and a more strongly grey-blue tone to the female's head. Population size is estimated at 5,000–20,000 individuals. Although only present in a small range, it is not currently considered threatened.
