= Zanha suaveolens =

Conservation status
- Endangered (IUCN 3.1)

Scientific classification
- Kingdom: Plantae
- Clade: Tracheophytes
- Clade: Angiosperms
- Clade: Eudicots
- Clade: Rosids
- Order: Sapindales
- Family: Sapindaceae
- Genus: Zanha
- Species: Z. suaveolens

Binomial name
- Zanha suaveolens Capuron

Species of flowering plant

Zanha suaveolens is a species of fruit plant in the family Sapindaceae that is endemic to Madagascar where it grows at an elevation of 0–499 metres (0–1,637 ft) in such provinces as Mahajanga and Toliara.
