= Arfeuillea =

Scientific classification
- Kingdom: Plantae
- Clade: Tracheophytes
- Clade: Angiosperms
- Clade: Eudicots
- Clade: Rosids
- Order: Sapindales
- Family: Sapindaceae
- Subfamily: Dodonaeoideae
- Genus: Arfeuillea; Pierre ex Radlk.
- Species: A. arborescens

Binomial name
- Arfeuillea arborescens Pierre ex Radlk.

Genus of flowering plants

Arfeuillea is a monotypic genus in the family Sapindaceae with Arfeuillea arborescens as its only species. Commonly known as hop tree, this species is characterized by compound leaves arranged spirally around the branches, flowers with small white petals and larger red sepals, and dehiscent papery yellow fruits with two black seeds encased. It is native to Laos and Thailand but is cultivated only and not found in the wild. The species serves as a street tree across its native range and in Malaysia and Singapore, and its antioxidant-rich leaves are included in many Thai herbal medicines.

== Description ==
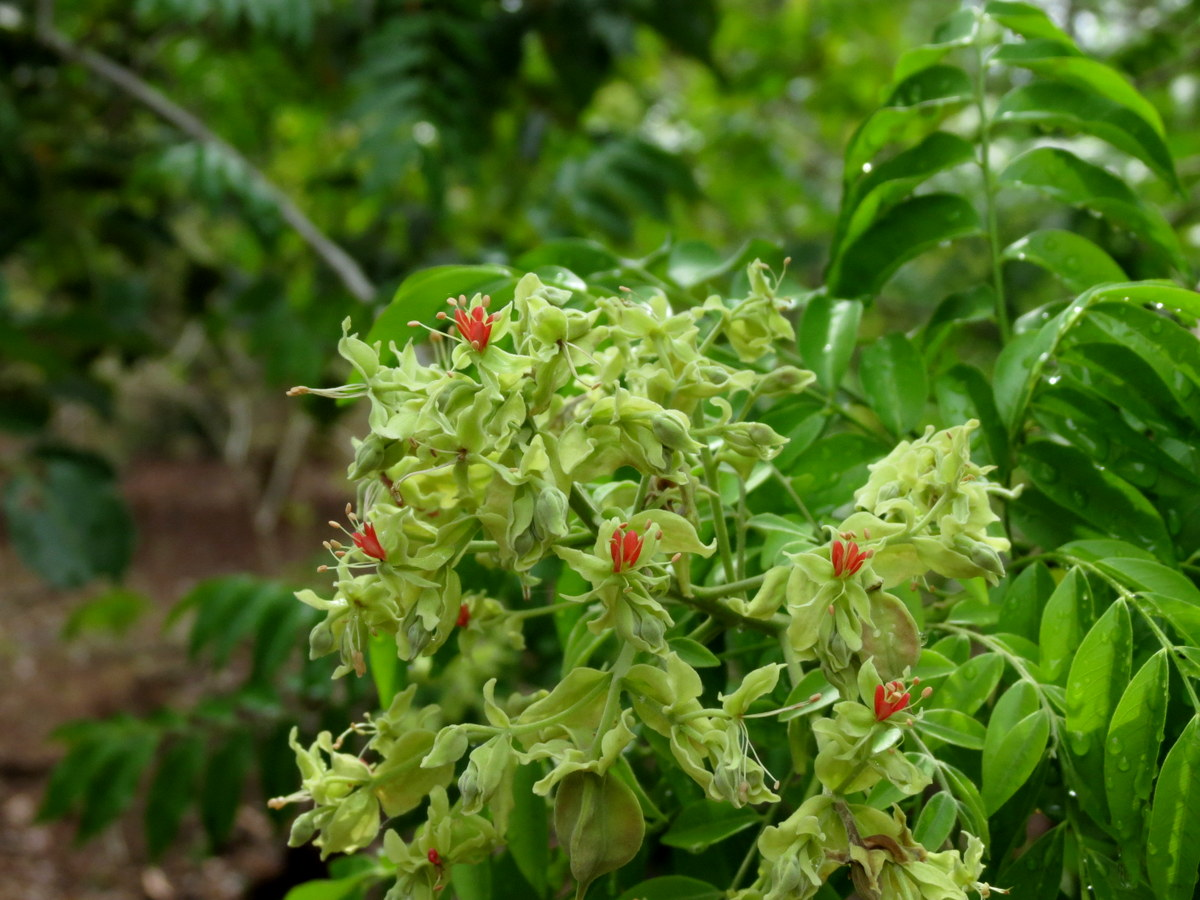
Stem morphology of Arfeuillea arborescens. Leaves are arranged in a spiral around the branches.

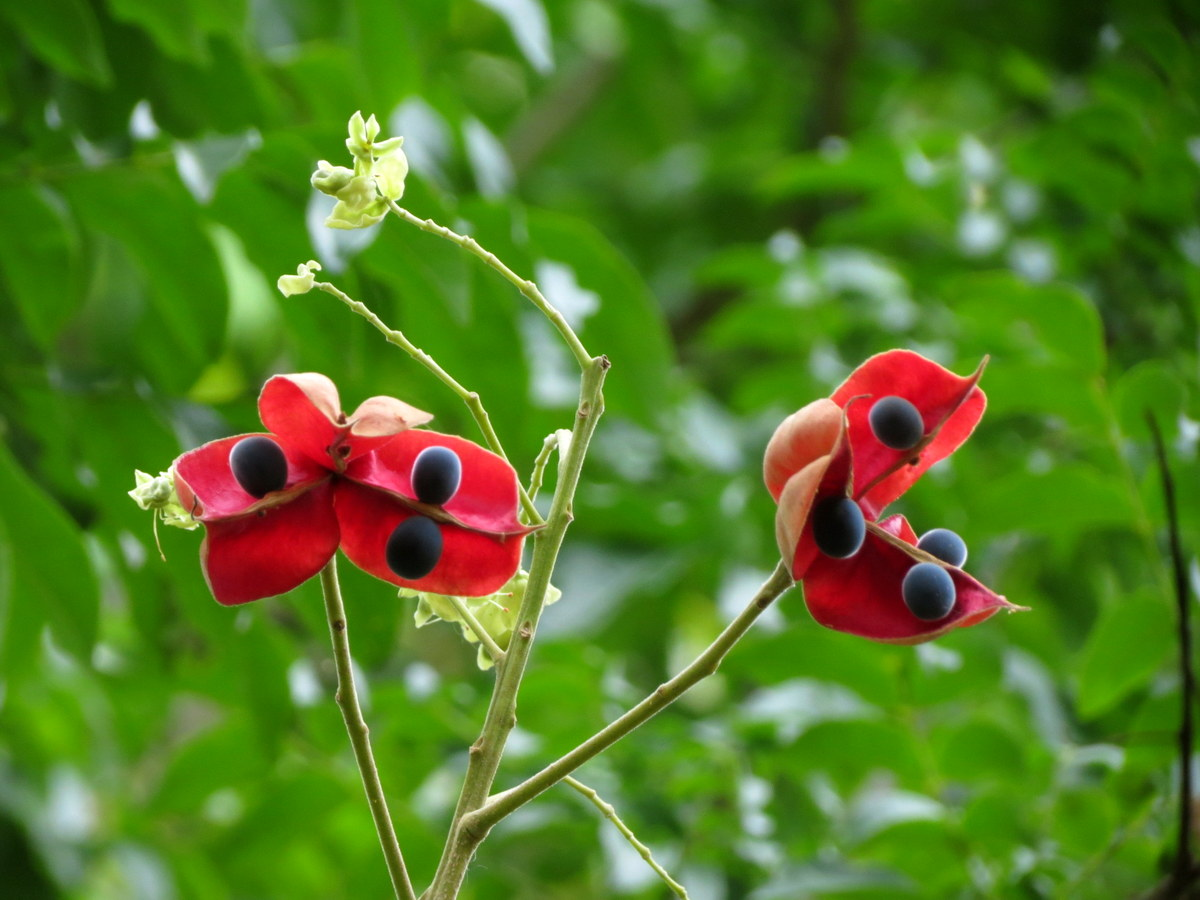
Arfeuillea arborescens has a bisexual flower with small white pedals surrounded by large red sepals.

Arfeuillea arborescens develops as a tree with a bushy, round crown. Its leaves are compound and include 3-4 pairs of entire (though sometimes serrate), elliptical leaflets, which are arranged spirally around the branches. The flowers are bisexual, have small white petals surrounded by larger red sepals, and are arranged in branched inflorescences. Fruits are simple, dehiscent, and golden yellow in color. They have three wings, are papery, and contain two large, ovular black seeds.

== Distribution and habitat ==
Arfeuillea aborescens is from southeast Asia, specifically Laos and Thailand. However, wild specimens are rare. Arfeuillea aborescens is exclusively cultivated.

== Taxonomy ==
There is only one species in this genus: Arfeuillea arborescens. Once grouped in the Koelreuteria genus, a synonymous name for this species is Koelreuteria arborescens. In calling it Arfeuillea arborescens, Pierre, the botanist who first described the species, named it after his friend, Arfeuille.

== Evolution and phylogeny ==
Arfeuillea arborescens is in the family Sapindaceae, the tribe Harpullieae, the subfamily Dodonaeoideae, the group Dodonaea, and the monotypic genus Arfeuillea. The subfamily Dodonaeoideae is characterized by its dehiscent fruits. Arfeuillea arborescens’ closest relative is Conchopetalum brachysepalum, a member of Sapindaceae native to Madagascar.

== Human uses ==
Arfeuillea are cultivated only. They are mainly planted alongside streets in residential areas in Malaysia, Singapore, and Thailand, but they can also be used as a spice. Fresh leaves of Arfeuillea arborescens contain antioxidant properties, so they are included in many Thai medicinal herbs.

=== Hybrids ===
Arfeuillea does not have any publicly documented hybrids outside of Arfeuillea arborescens. Since it is cultivated, there is a possibility for man made hybrids to exist.
