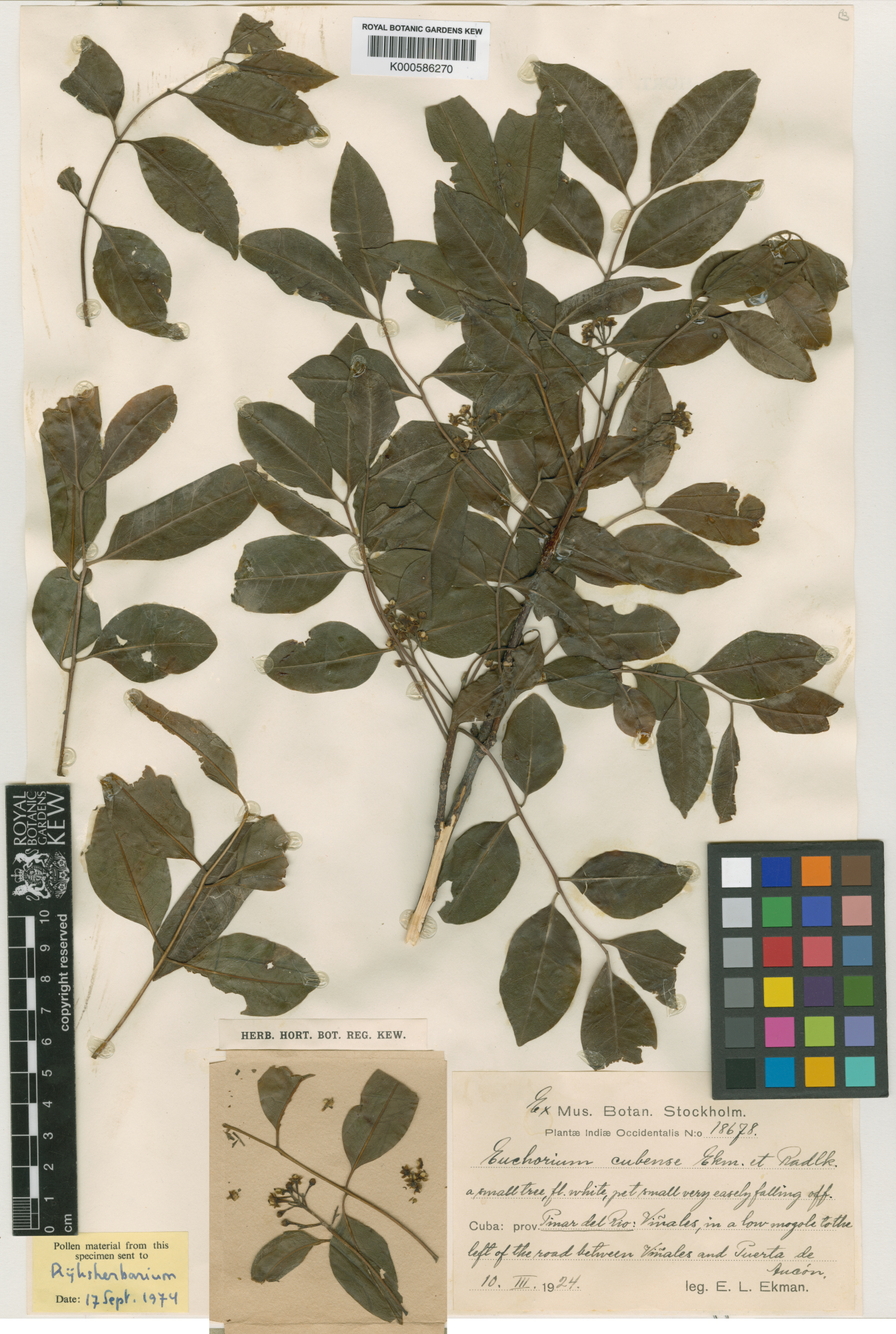

Conservation status
- Extinct (1924) (IUCN 3.1)

Scientific classification
- Kingdom: Plantae
- Clade: Tracheophytes
- Clade: Angiosperms
- Clade: Eudicots
- Clade: Rosids
- Order: Sapindales
- Family: Sapindaceae
- Subfamily: Dodonaeoideae
- Genus: †Euchorium; Ekman & Radlk.
- Species: †E. cubense

Binomial name
- †Euchorium cubense Ekman & Radlk.

= Euchorium =

Extinct genus of flowering plants

Euchorium is a monospecific genus of plants in the family Sapindaceae. The only species, Euchorium cubense is endemic to Viñales, Pinar del Río Province, Cuba. It has not been relocated since its discovery despite several searches, and is thus considered extinct.
