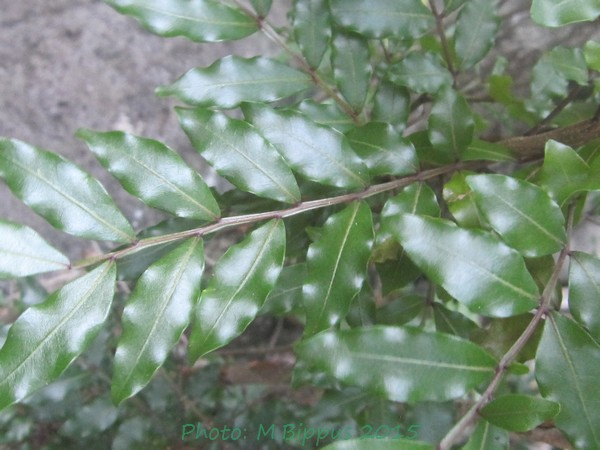
- Doratoxylon apetalum

Scientific classification
- Kingdom: Plantae
- Clade: Tracheophytes
- Clade: Angiosperms
- Clade: Eudicots
- Clade: Rosids
- Order: Sapindales
- Family: Sapindaceae
- Subfamily: Dodonaeoideae
- Genus: Doratoxylon; Thouars ex Benth. & Hook.f.

Species
- See text

= Doratoxylon =

Genus of flowering plants

Doratoxylon is a genus of flowering plants in the family Sapindaceae.

== Species ==
Species in this genus are:

- Doratoxylon alatum (Radlk.) Capuron
- Doratoxylon apetalum (Poir.) Radlk.
- Doratoxylon chouxii Capuron
- Doratoxylon littorale Capuron
- Doratoxylon stipulatum Capuron
