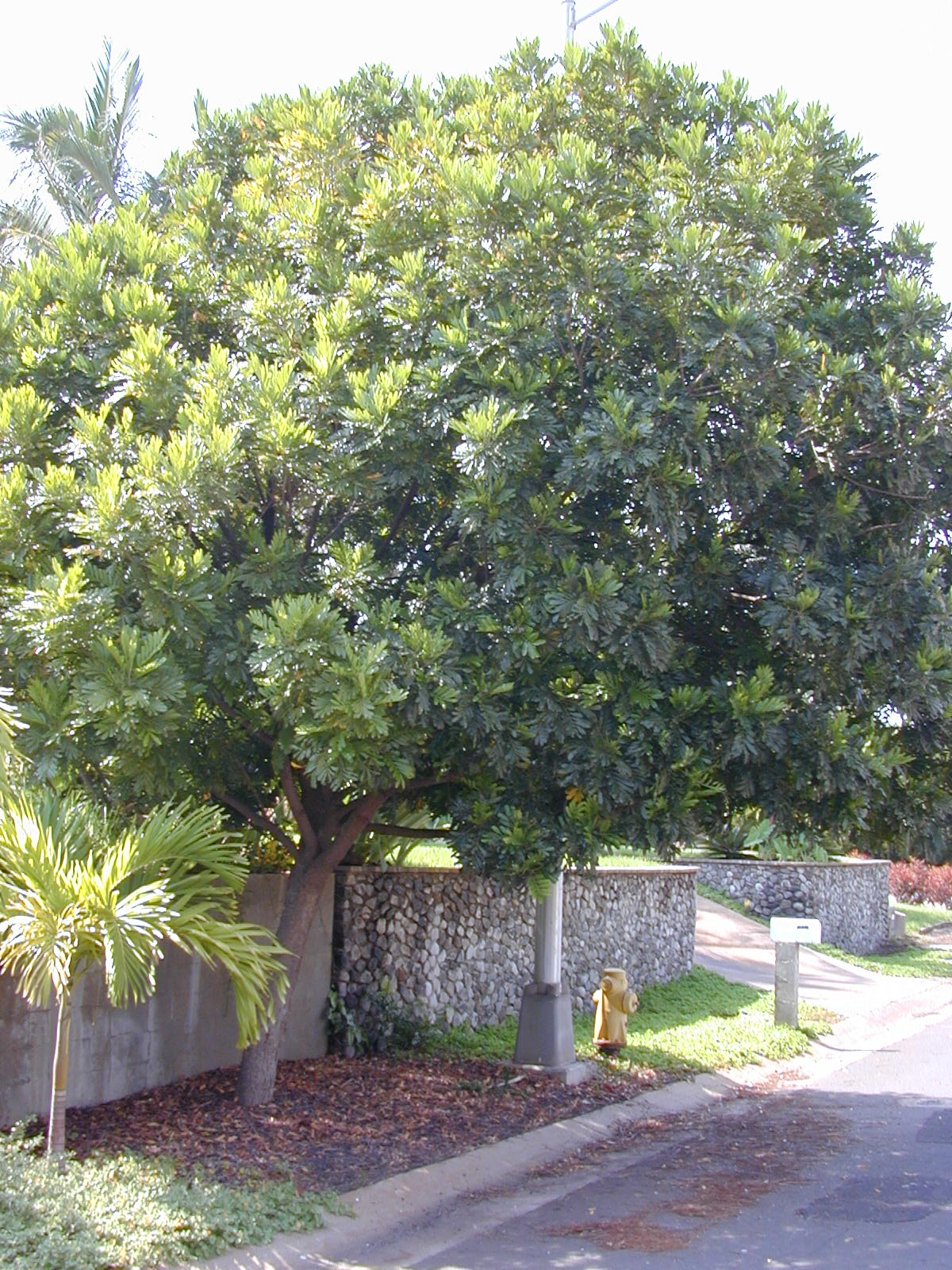
- Filicium decipiens as a street tree in Maui

Scientific classification
- Kingdom: Plantae
- Clade: Tracheophytes
- Clade: Angiosperms
- Clade: Eudicots
- Clade: Rosids
- Order: Sapindales
- Family: Sapindaceae
- Subfamily: Dodonaeoideae
- Tribe: Doratoxyleae
- Genus: Filicium; Thwaites (1864)

Species
- See text

Synonyms
- Pseudoprotorhus H.Perrier (1944); Jurighas L. ex Kuntze (1891); Pteridophyllum Thwaites (1854), nom. illeg.

= Filicium =

Genus of Sapindaceae plants

Filicium is a genus of flowering plants in the soapberry family Sapindaceae, native to east Africa, Madagascar, India and Sri Lanka. The best known species is Filicium decipiens, which is planted as an ornamental tree.

== Species ==
Three species are currently accepted.

- Filicium decipiens (Wight & Arn.) Thwaites
- Filicium longifolium (H.Perrier) Capuron
- Filicium thouarsianum (DC.) Capuron
