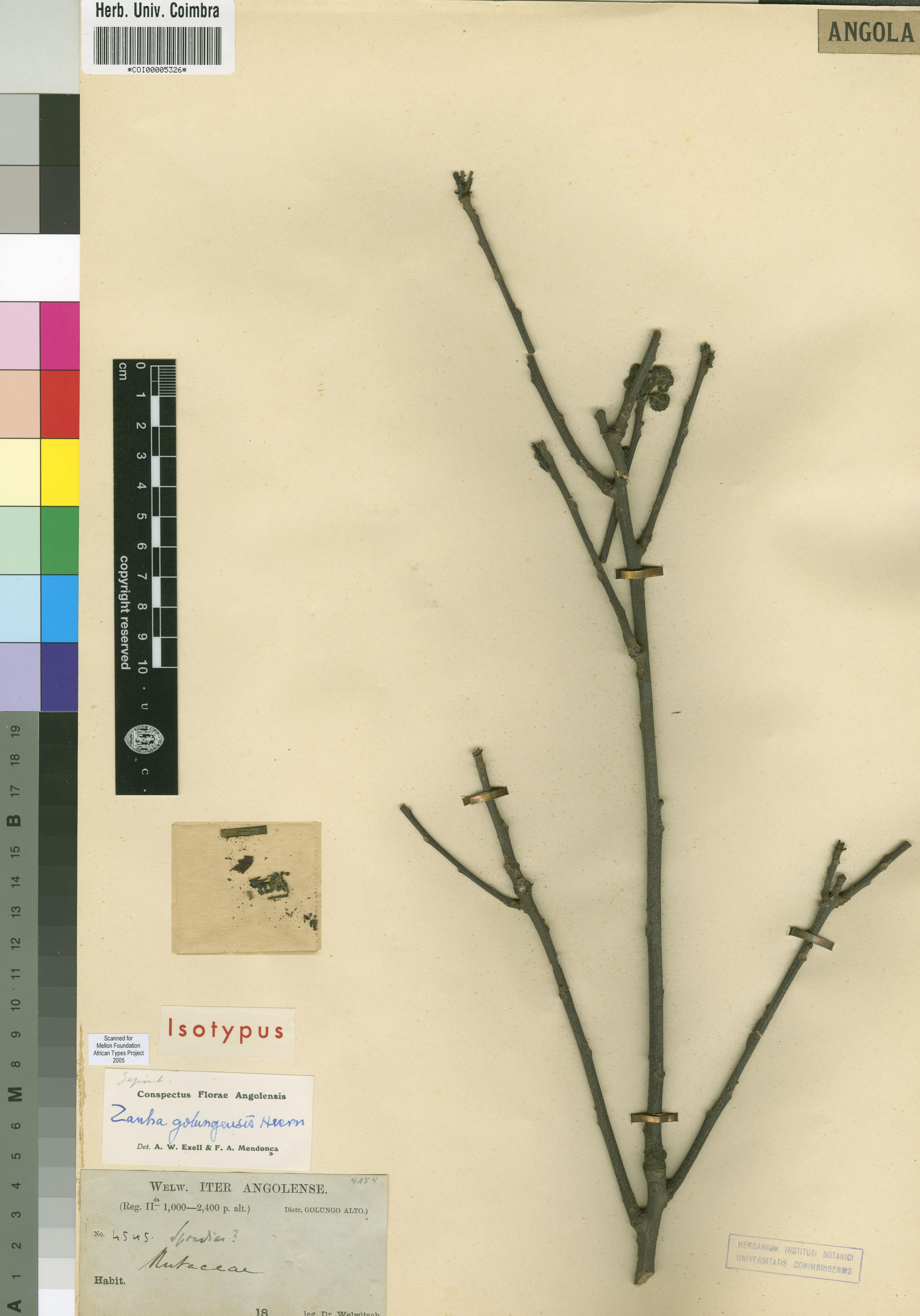
- Zanha golungensis isotype specimen

Conservation status
- Least Concern (IUCN 3.1)

Scientific classification
- Kingdom: Plantae
- Clade: Embryophytes
- Clade: Tracheophytes
- Clade: Spermatophytes
- Clade: Angiosperms
- Clade: Eudicots
- Clade: Rosids
- Order: Sapindales
- Family: Sapindaceae
- Genus: Zanha
- Species: Z. golungensis

Binomial name
- Zanha golungensis Hiern

Synonyms
- Talisiopsis oliviformis Radlk.; Zanha vuilletii A.Chev.

= Zanha golungensis =

Species of flowering plant

Zanha golungensis, commonly known as the smooth-fruited zanha, is a species of plant in the family Sapindaceae that is native to Africa. It is used locally for timber and herbal medicine.

== Distribution and habitat ==
Zanha golungensis is widely distributed across tropical Africa and can be found in Angola, Benin, Burkina Faso, Cameroon, Central African Republic, Democratic Republic of the Congo, Ethiopia, Ghana, Guinea, Ivory Coast, Kenya, Malawi, Mali, Mozambique, Nigeria, Rwanda, Senegal, South Sudan, Sudan, Tanzania, Togo, Uganda, Zambia, and Zimbabwe. It primarily occurs in deciduous woodland and forest at altitudes of 300–1,700 m (980–5,580 ft), occurring less commonly in evergreen forest and drier areas of riparian forest.

== Description ==
Zanha golungensis is a shrub or small to medium sized tree growing to 30–40 m (98–131 ft) tall. The trunk is cylindrical, sometimes crooked, growing up to 170 cm (67 in) wide. The bark is greyish to dark brown and flaky. The leaves are paripinnate, each bearing between 3 and 7 pairs of leaflets in an alternate arrangement. The leaflets are ovate to elliptic or oblong-elliptic, with a cuneate base and a blunt tip, each measuring 6–17 cm (2.4–6.7 in) by 2–5.5 cm (0.79–2.17 in). The leaflets are hairless or sparsely hairy and borne on 2 mm (0.079 in) long petiolules. The petioles measure up to 12 cm (4.7 in) long, forming a rachis measuring up to 15 cm (5.9 in) long. The inflorescence is a dense panicle, with individual flowers borne on pedicels that measure up to 3 cm (1.2 in) long. The flowers are small, greenish in colour, and sweet-scented. The flowers lack petals, instead having 4 to 5 sepals, each approximately 4.5 mm (0.18 in) long, fused at the base and hairy on the outside. This species is dioecious, with male flowers lacking an ovary and female flowers bearing only rudimentary stamens. The fruit is a hairless yellow, orange, or pink drupe, measuring 2 cm (0.79 in) by 1.5 cm (0.59 in). The seed is ellipsoid and measures up to 2 cm (0.79 in) long.

== Ecology ==
Zanha golungensis is deciduous, shedding most of its leaves during the dry season. Flowering occurs before the appearance of new leaves. The fruits are eaten by birds, chimpanzees, gorillas, and monkeys, who likely serve as seed dispersers.

== Uses ==
The wood of Zanha golungensis is not considered commercially valuable as timber, but is used locally for construction, firewood, and furniture building. Several parts of the plant contain saponins and the bark is sometimes used as a substitute for soap. Some sources claim that the fruits are not eaten by humans, but other accounts from the Democratic Republic of Congo, Malawi, Togo, and Uganda dispute this. The bark, leaves, roots, and twigs of Z. golungensis are widely used as herbal medicine for a variety of ailments, including aches and pains, fevers, headaches, gastrointestinal problems, nausea, respiratory problems, toothaches. Herbal preparations of Z. golungensis are also reported to be used to facilitate childbirth, treat disorders of pregnancy, and as a galactagogue.
