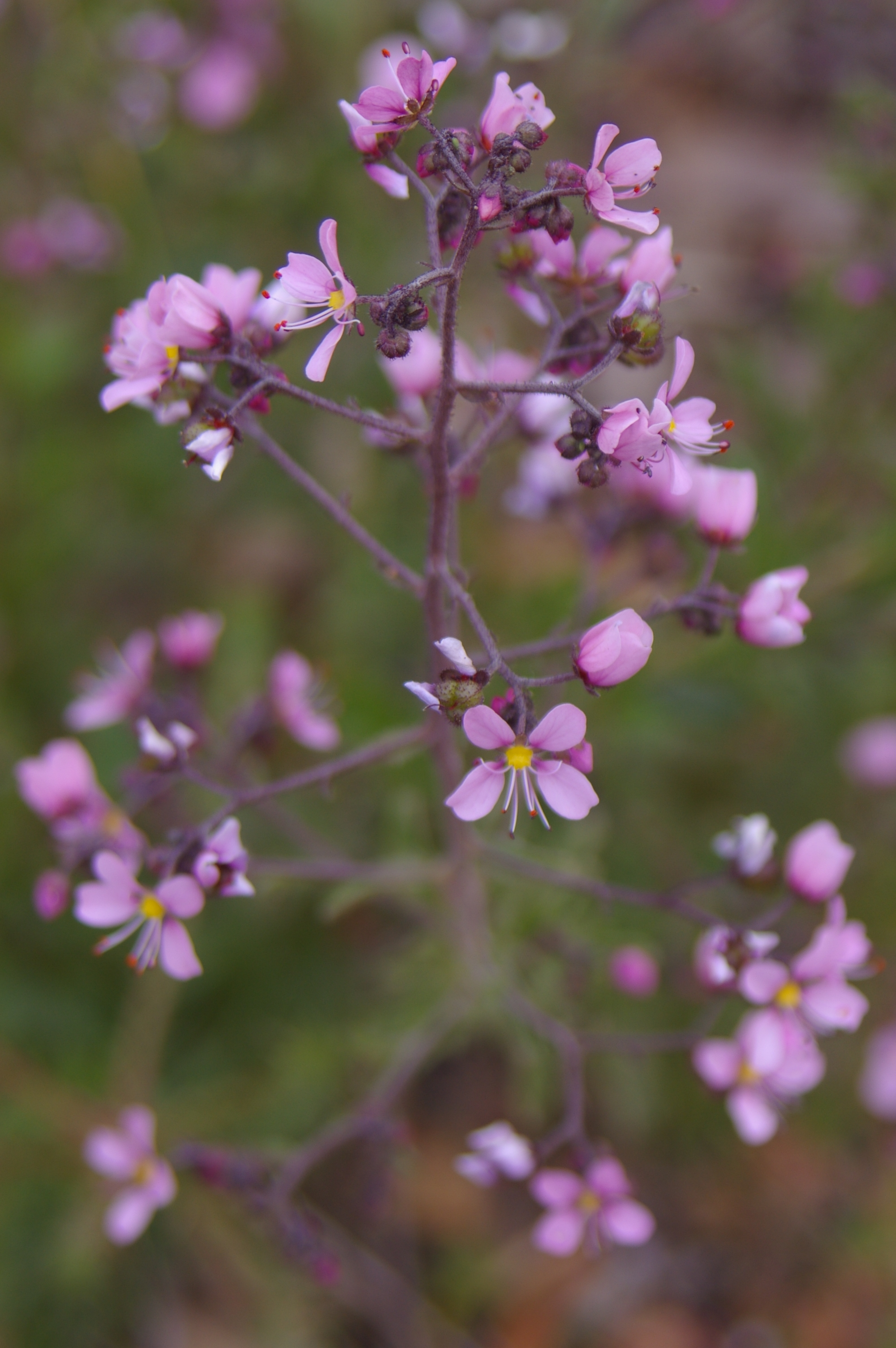
- Diplopeltis huegelii in Gooseberry Hill National Park

Scientific classification
- Kingdom: Plantae
- Clade: Tracheophytes
- Clade: Angiosperms
- Clade: Eudicots
- Clade: Rosids
- Order: Sapindales
- Family: Sapindaceae
- Genus: Diplopeltis
- Species: D. huegelii

Binomial name
- Diplopeltis huegelii Endl.

Synonyms
- Diplopeltis preissii Miq.; Diplopeltis lehmannii Miq.

= Diplopeltis huegelii =

Species of flowering plant

Diplopeltis huegelii is a shrub species in the soapberry family, Sapindaceae. It is endemic to Western Australia. Plants grow to between 0.1 and 1.5 metres high. White, pink or purple flowers are produced between April and December in the species' native range.

The species was first formally described by Austrian botanist Stephen Endlicher in 1837. The type specimen was collected in Fremantle by Charles von Hügel.

Three subspecies are currently recognised:

- D. huegelii Endl. subsp. huegelii
- D. huegelii subsp. lehmannii (Miq.) Keighery
- D. huegelii subsp. subintegra (A.S.George) Keighery
