= Euphorianthus =

Scientific classification
- Kingdom: Plantae
- Clade: Tracheophytes
- Clade: Angiosperms
- Clade: Eudicots
- Clade: Rosids
- Order: Sapindales
- Family: Sapindaceae
- Subfamily: Dodonaeoideae
- Genus: Euphorianthus; Radlk.
- Species: E. euneurus

Binomial name
- Euphorianthus euneurus (Miq.) Leenh.

Genus of plants

Euphorianthus is a genus of flowering plants belonging to the family Sapindaceae. The only species is Euphorianthus euneurus.

Its native range is Central Malesia to Vanuatu.
