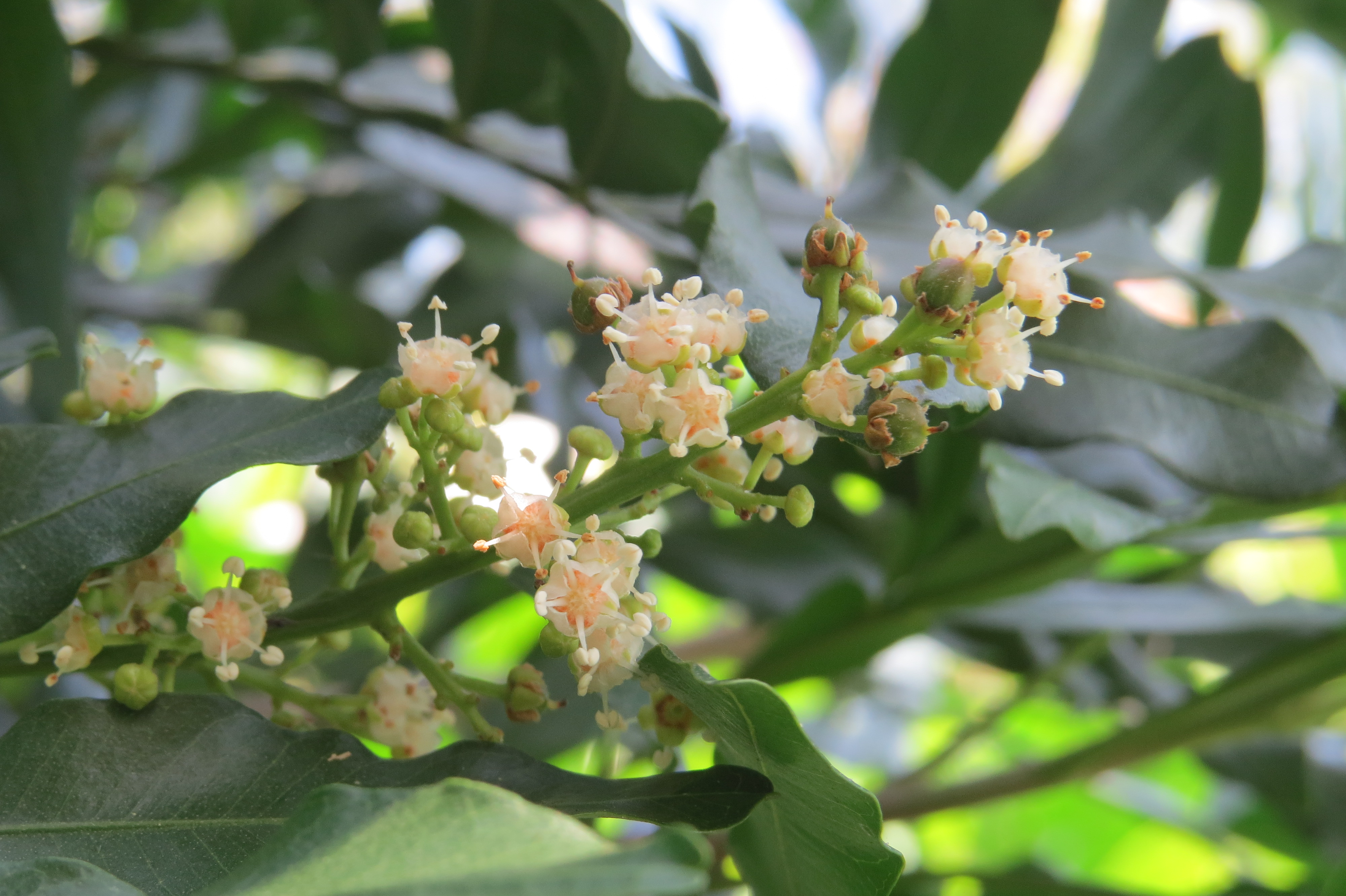
- Inflorescence

Scientific classification
- Kingdom: Plantae
- Clade: Embryophytes
- Clade: Tracheophytes
- Clade: Spermatophytes
- Clade: Angiosperms
- Clade: Eudicots
- Clade: Rosids
- Order: Sapindales
- Family: Sapindaceae
- Genus: Filicium
- Species: F. decipiens

Binomial name
- Filicium decipiens (Wight & Arn.) Thwaites

Synonyms
- Filicium decipiens f. apterum Capuron; Filicium elongatum Radlk. ex Taub.; Jurighas decipiens (Wight & Arn.) Kuntze; Pteridophyllum decipiens (Wight & Arn.) Thwaites; Rhus decipiens Wight & Arn.

= Filicium decipiens =

Species of plant in the family Sapindaceae

Filicium decipiens, called the ferntree, fern tree or fern leaf tree, is a species of Filicium found in east Africa, Madagascar, India and Sri Lanka. It is planted as an ornamental tree in the Indian subcontinent, Indonesia, Hawaii, and elsewhere.

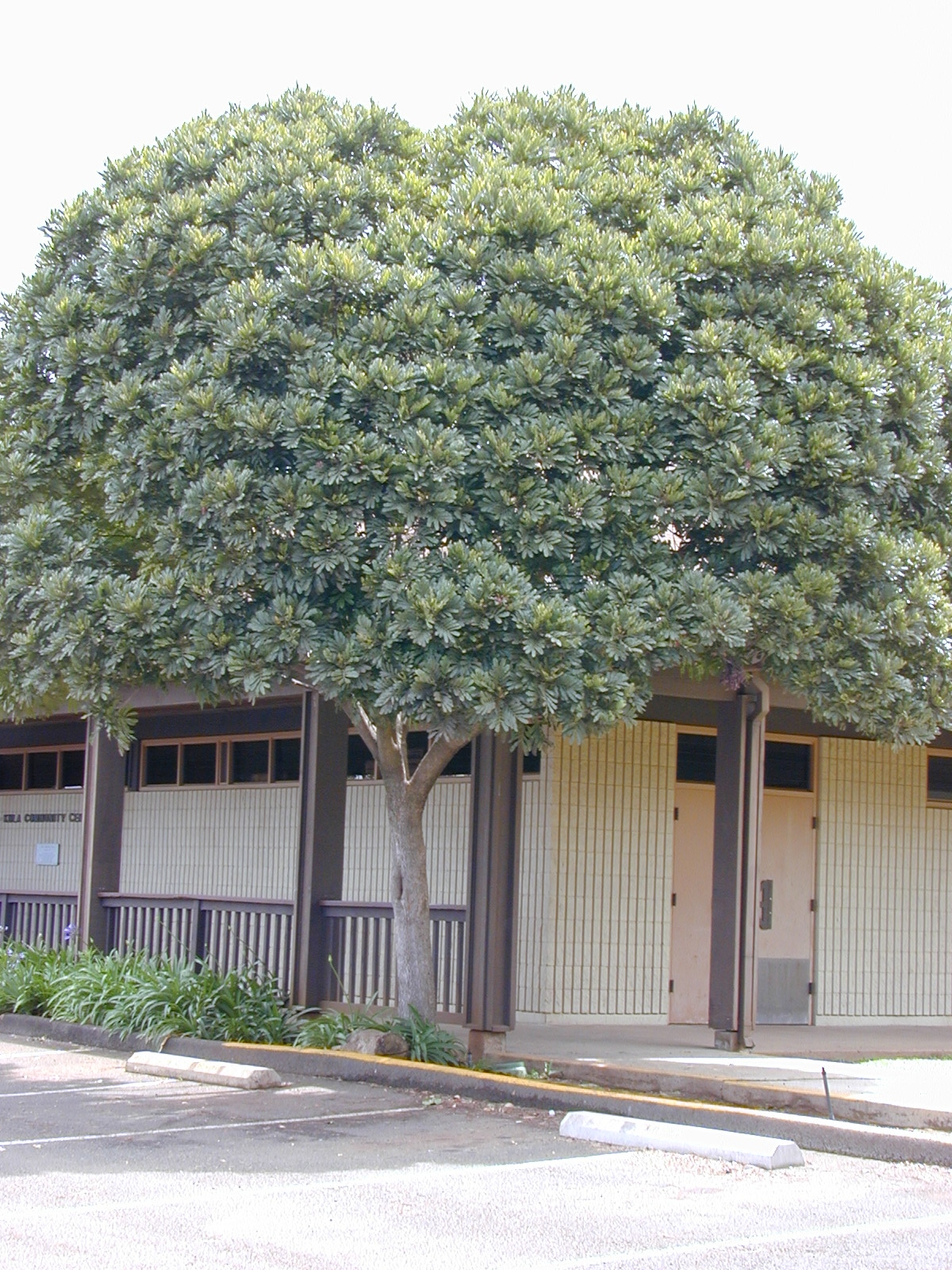
As a street tree in Maui
