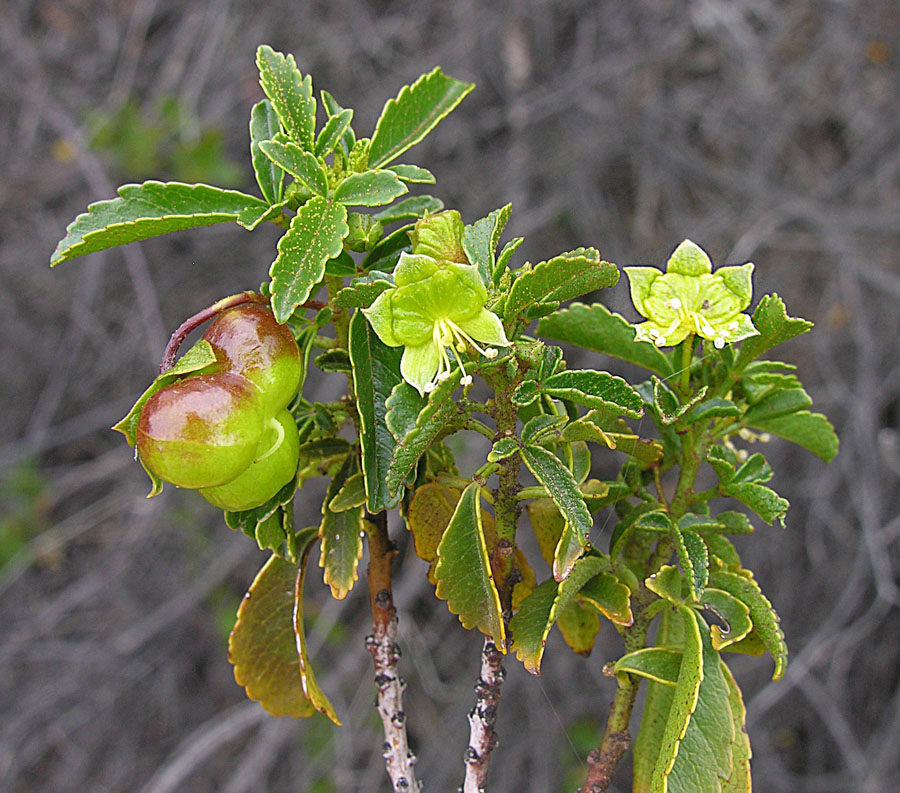
- Llagunosa glandulosa

Scientific classification
- Kingdom: Plantae
- Clade: Tracheophytes
- Clade: Angiosperms
- Clade: Eudicots
- Clade: Rosids
- Order: Sapindales
- Family: Sapindaceae
- Subfamily: Dodonaeoideae
- Genus: Llagunoa; Ruiz & Pav.

Synonyms
- Amirola Pers.; Orbignya Bertero

= Llagunoa =

Genus of flowering plants

Llagunoa is a genus of flowering plants belonging to the family Sapindaceae.

Its native range is Southern America. It is found in the countries of Bolivia, Chile, Colombia, Ecuador, Peru and Venezuela.

The genus name of Llagunoa is in honour of Eugenio de Llaguno y Amírola (1724–1799), a Spanish politician and writer. It was first described and published in Fl. Peruv. Prodr. on page 126 in 1794.

== Known species ==
According to Kew:

- Llagunoa glandulosa G.Don
- Llagunoa nitida Ruiz & Pav.
- Llagunoa venezuelana Steyerm.
