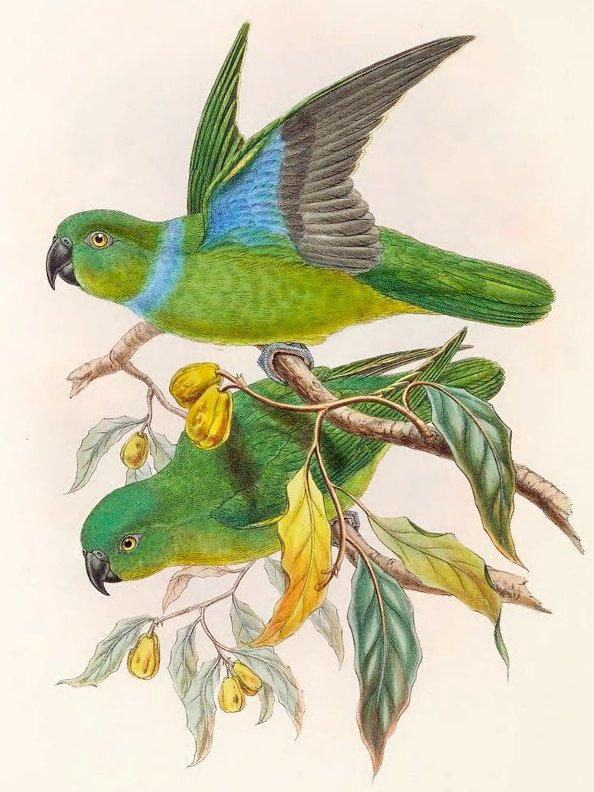

Conservation status
- Least Concern (IUCN 3.1)

Scientific classification
- Kingdom: Animalia
- Phylum: Chordata
- Class: Aves
- Order: Psittaciformes
- Family: Psittaculidae
- Genus: Geoffroyus
- Species: G. simplex

Binomial name
- Geoffroyus simplex (Meyer, 1874)

= Blue-collared parrot =

Species of bird

The blue-collared parrot (Geoffroyus simplex) also known as simple parrot, lilac-collared song parrot, or lilac-collared Geoffroy's parrot, is a parrot found in the higher elevations of New Guinea. It is found from 500 to 2300 m, mainly between 800 and 1900 m (though food shortages will send them lower). It is 23–25 cm, mainly green with a black beak, yellow wing bend, blue underwing coverts, and a pale yellow iris. Adult males have a blue collar across upper breast to lower neck above the mantle, adult females have some blue on the rear crown. Juveniles have no blue and a paler bill. There are two subspecies:

- G. s. simplex: On Vogelkop. 23 cm
- G. s. buergersi: On rest of island. 25 cm, collar on males is duller but wider in back.

It inhabits humid hill forest and forest edges. Flocks are up to 200.
