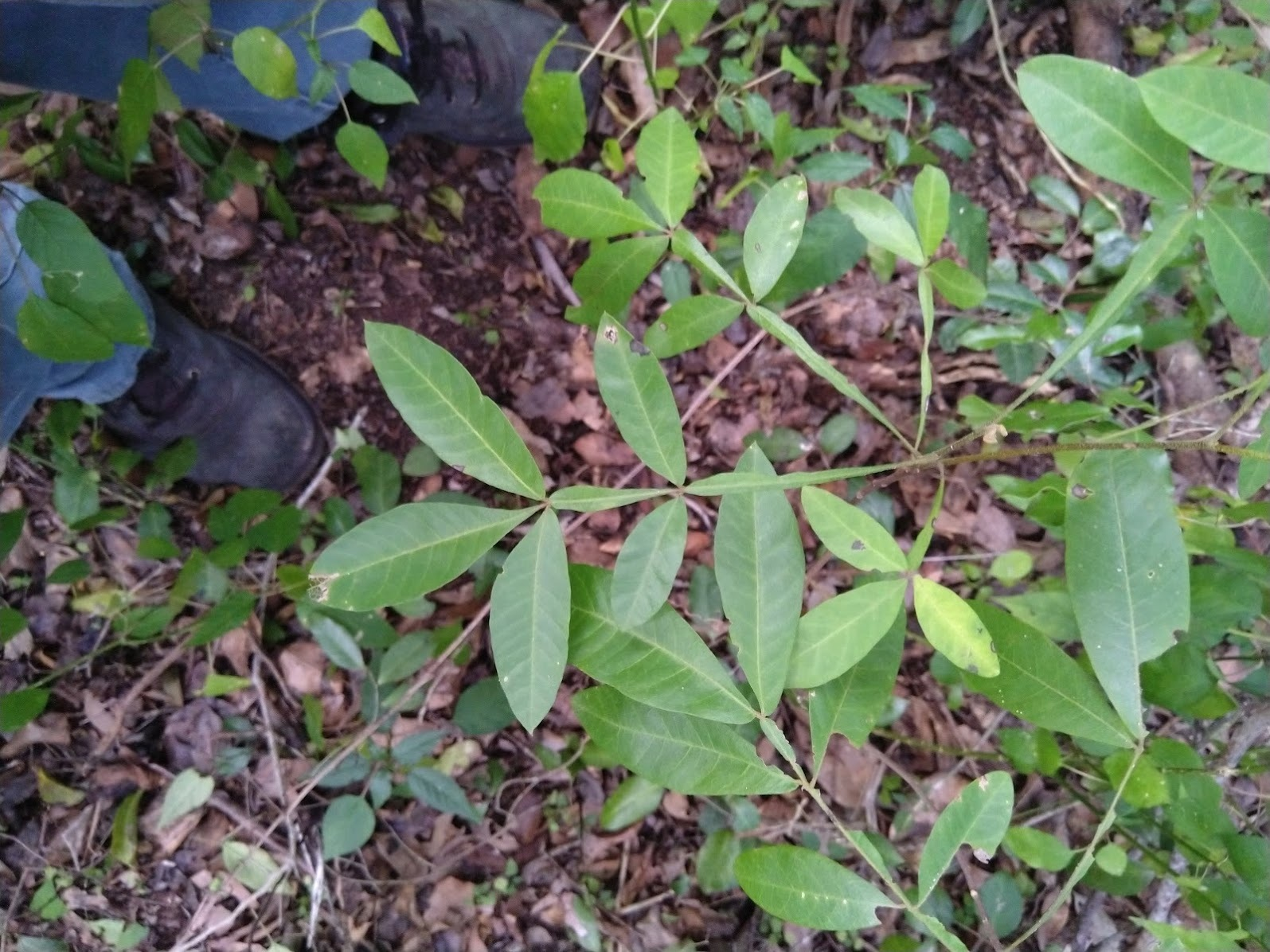
- Young specimen photographed in Tuan Forest

Conservation status
- Endangered (EPBC Act)

Scientific classification
- Kingdom: Plantae
- Clade: Tracheophytes
- Clade: Angiosperms
- Clade: Eudicots
- Clade: Rosids
- Order: Sapindales
- Family: Sapindaceae
- Genus: Cossinia
- Species: C. australiana

Binomial name
- Cossinia australiana S.T.Reynolds

= Cossinia australiana =

Species of flowering plant

Cossinia australiana is a species of seasonal rainforest trees endemic to restricted areas of Queensland, Australia, and constituting part of the plant family Sapindaceae.

They are found only in restricted habitat areas of central-eastern to southeastern Queensland.

Both the Australian national and Queensland state governments have given the official conservation status of "endangered" for this species' remaining populations of trees.

Within their endemic region the trees grow naturally in habitats of seasonal–drought adapted rainforests and associated vegetation types not adapted to fire, typically on nutrient–rich soils derived from basalt parent materials, which have historically had their native vegetation extensively destroyed and as of 2013 been further threatened.

This species name and description was formally published for the first time in 1982 by Sally T. Reynolds of the Queensland Herbarium.
