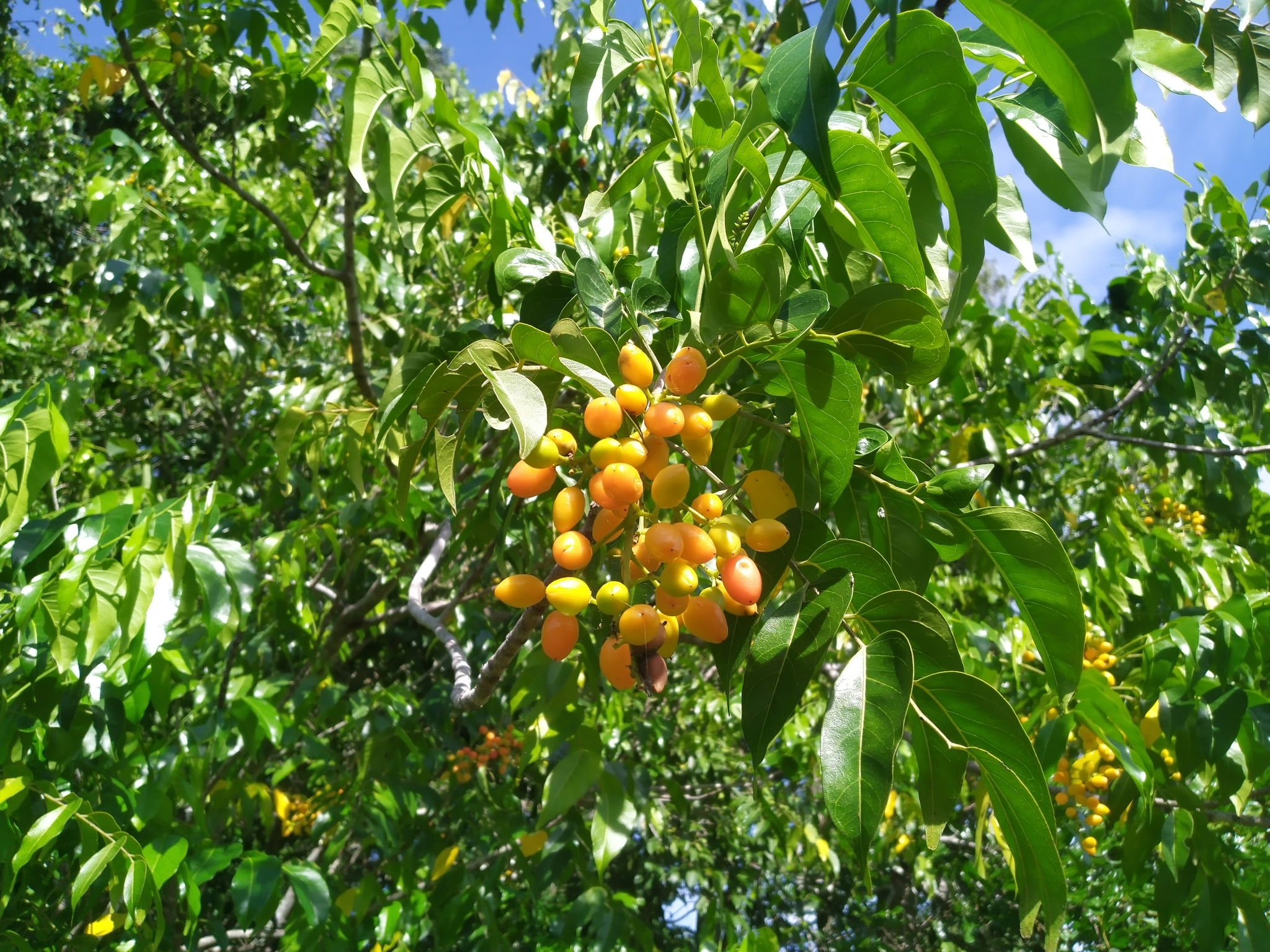
- Ganophyllum falcatum in Queensland

Scientific classification
- Kingdom: Plantae
- Clade: Tracheophytes
- Clade: Angiosperms
- Clade: Eudicots
- Clade: Rosids
- Order: Sapindales
- Family: Sapindaceae
- Subfamily: Dodonaeoideae
- Genus: Ganophyllum; Blume

Species
- See text

= Ganophyllum =

Genus of flowering plants

Ganophyllum is a genus of flowering plants in the soapberry family, Sapindaceae.

Species include:

- Ganophyllum falcatum Blume — scaly ash, scaly bark ash, Daintree hickory, honeywood
- Ganophyllum giganteum (A.Chev.) Hauman
