= Conchopetalum =

Scientific classification
- Kingdom: Plantae
- Clade: Tracheophytes
- Clade: Angiosperms
- Clade: Eudicots
- Clade: Rosids
- Order: Sapindales
- Family: Sapindaceae
- Subfamily: Dodonaeoideae
- Genus: Conchopetalum; Radlk.

Genus of flowering plants

Conchopetalum is a genus of flowering plants belonging to the family Sapindaceae.

Its native range is Madagascar.

Species:

- Conchopetalum brachysepalum Capuron
- Conchopetalum madagascariense Radlk.
