= Hirania =

Scientific classification
- Kingdom: Plantae
- Clade: Tracheophytes
- Clade: Angiosperms
- Clade: Eudicots
- Clade: Rosids
- Order: Sapindales
- Family: Sapindaceae
- Subfamily: Dodonaeoideae
- Tribe: Dodonaeae
- Genus: Hirania; Thulin (2006 publ. 2007)
- Species: H. rosea

Binomial name
- Hirania rosea Thulin (2006 publ. 2007)

Genus of plants

Hirania rosea is a species of flowering plant in family Sapindaceae. It is a shrub endemic to central Somalia. It is the sole species in genus Hirania.
