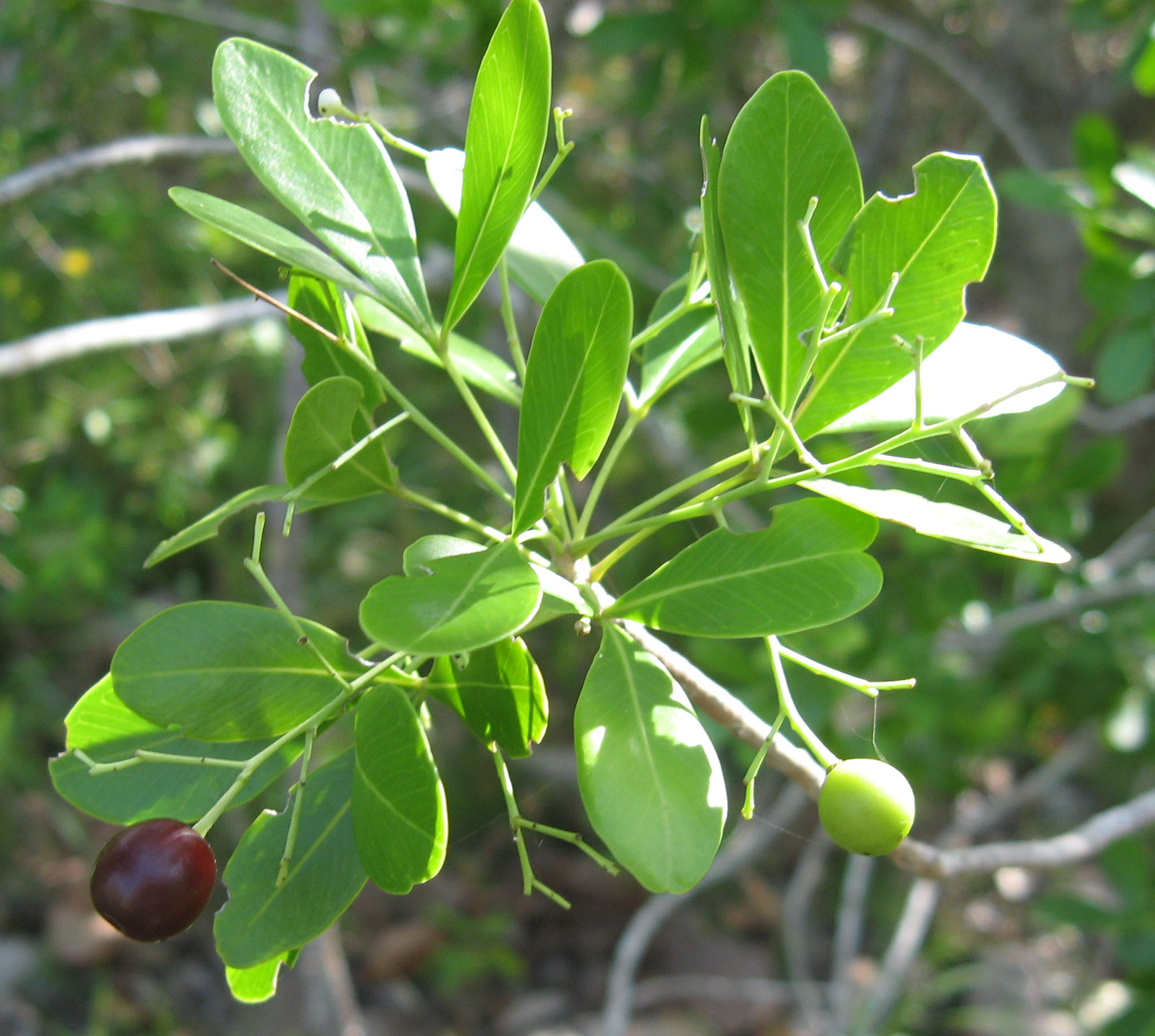

Scientific classification
- Kingdom: Plantae
- Clade: Tracheophytes
- Clade: Angiosperms
- Clade: Eudicots
- Clade: Rosids
- Order: Sapindales
- Family: Sapindaceae
- Subfamily: Dodonaeoideae
- Genus: Hypelate; P. Browne
- Species: H. trifoliata

Binomial name
- Hypelate trifoliata Sw.

= Hypelate =

Genus of flowering plants

Hypelate trifoliata, commonly known as white ironwood or inkwood, is a small tree in the soapberry family. It is native to extreme southern Florida and islands of the Caribbean. It has trifoliate leaves and produces small flowers in early summer.

Hypelate is a monotypic genus.
