= Averrhoidium =

Scientific classification
- Kingdom: Plantae
- Clade: Tracheophytes
- Clade: Angiosperms
- Clade: Eudicots
- Clade: Rosids
- Order: Sapindales
- Family: Sapindaceae
- Subfamily: Dodonaeoideae
- Genus: Averrhoidium; Baill.

Genus of flowering plants

Averrhoidium is a genus of flowering plants belonging to the family Sapindaceae.

Its native range is Southern Mexico, Brazil to Paraguay.

Species:

- Averrhoidium dalyi Acev.-Rodr. & Ferrucci
- Averrhoidium gardnerianum Baill.
- Averrhoidium paraguaiense Radlk.
- Averrhoidium spondioides (Standl.) Acev.-Rodr. & Ferrucci
