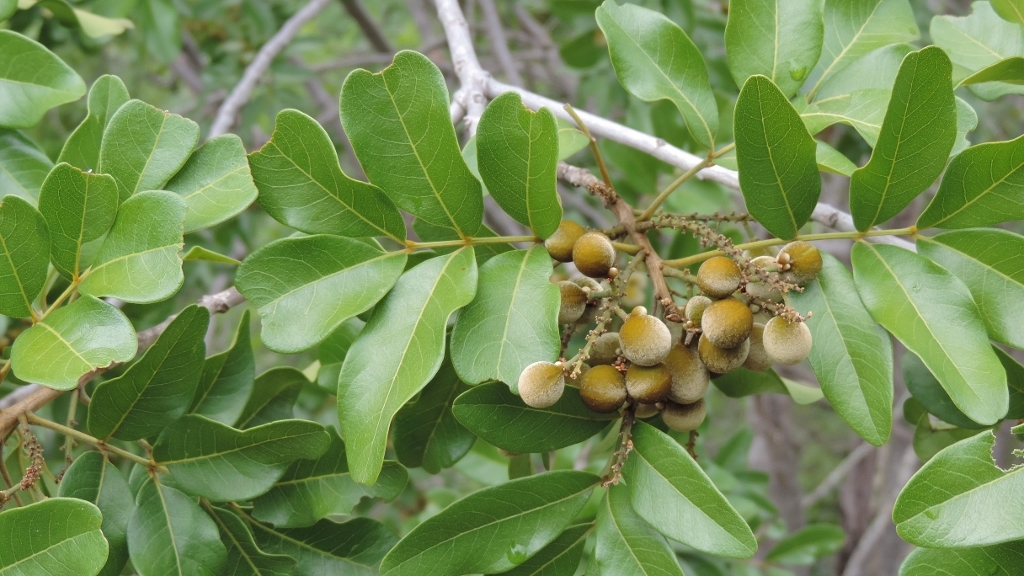
- Zanha africana in Zimbabwe

Scientific classification
- Kingdom: Plantae
- Clade: Embryophytes
- Clade: Tracheophytes
- Clade: Spermatophytes
- Clade: Angiosperms
- Clade: Eudicots
- Clade: Rosids
- Order: Sapindales
- Family: Sapindaceae
- Subfamily: Dodonaeoideae
- Genus: Zanha; Hiern

Species
- 3, see text

Synonyms
- Dialiopsis Radlk.; Talisiopsis Radlk.

= Zanha =

Genus of flowering plants

Zanha is a small genus of plants in the family Sapindaceae that are native to Africa.

== Description ==
Members of the genus Zanha are medium-sized deciduous trees with paripinnate leaves. The inflorescence is a short paniculate thyrse that bears dioecious flowers. The fruit is a reddish drupe.

== Species ==
This genus includes the following species:

- Zanha africana (Radlk.) Exell – Angola, Botswana, Democratic Republic of the Congo, Kenya, Malawi, Mozambique, Namibia, Tanzania, Zambia, Zimbabwe
- Zanha golungensis Hiern – Angola, Benin, Burkina Faso, Cameroon, Central African Republic, Democratic Republic of the Congo, Ethiopia, Ghana, Guinea, Ivory Coast, Kenya, Malawi, Mali, Mozambique, Nigeria, Rwanda, Senegal, Sudan, Tanzania, Togo, Uganda, Zambia, Zimbabwe
- Zanha suaveolens Capuron – Madagascar
