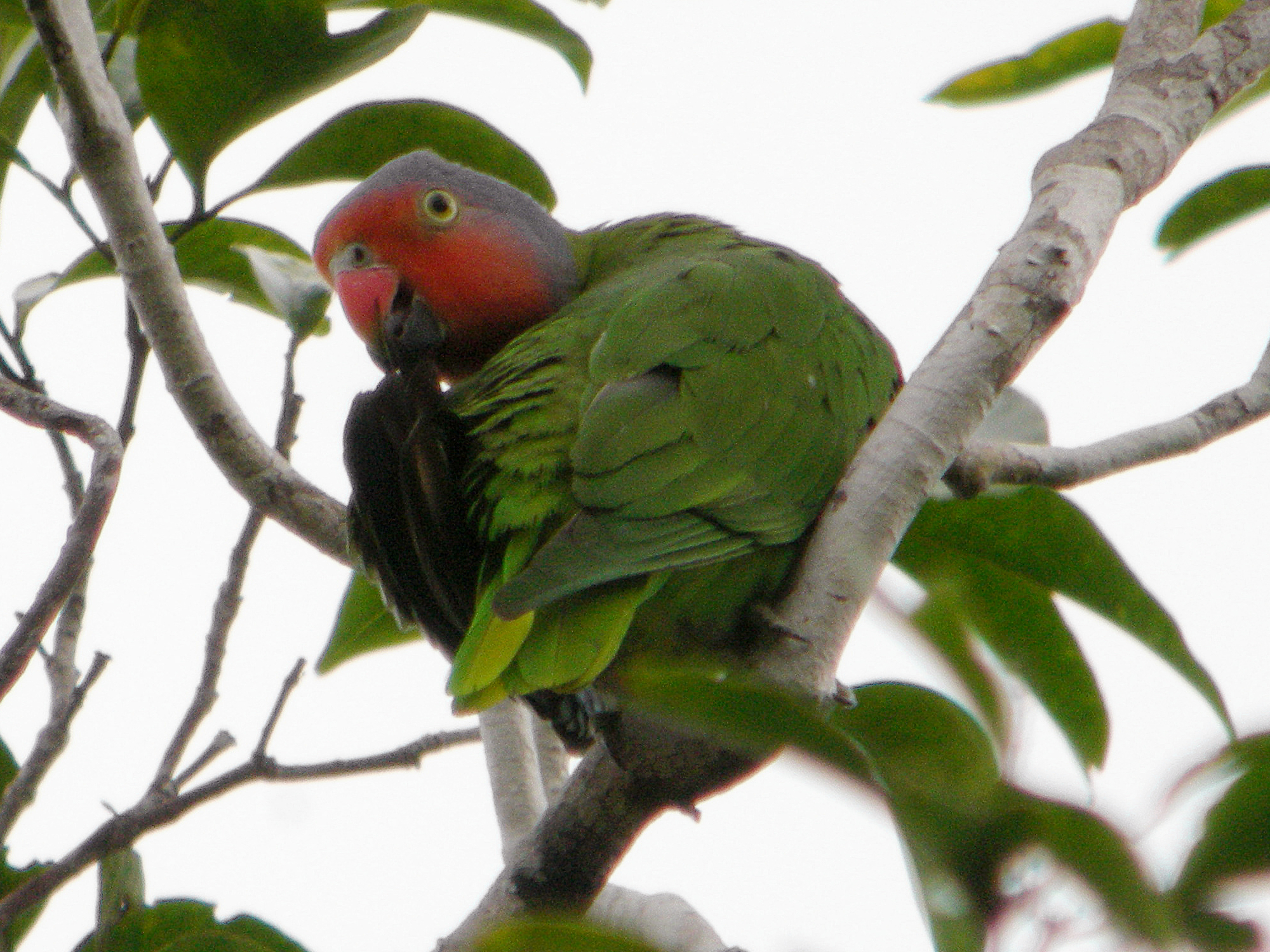
- Red-cheeked parrot in Papua New Guinea

Scientific classification
- Kingdom: Animalia
- Phylum: Chordata
- Class: Aves
- Order: Psittaciformes
- Family: Psittaculidae
- Tribe: Psittaculini
- Genus: Geoffroyus; Bonaparte, 1850

Type species
- Psittacus geoffroyi Bechstein, 1811

= Geoffroyus =

Genus of birds

Geoffroyus is a genus of parrot in the family Psittaculidae. The four species are found in and around New Guinea, the Solomon Islands, northern Australia and the islands of Indonesia. It contains the following four species:

| Image | Common name | Scientific name |
|---|---|---|
| | Red-cheeked parrot | Geoffroyus geoffroyi |
| | Blue-collared parrot | Geoffroyus simplex |
| | Song parrot | Geoffroyus heteroclitus |
| | Rennell parrot | Geoffroyus hyacinthinus |

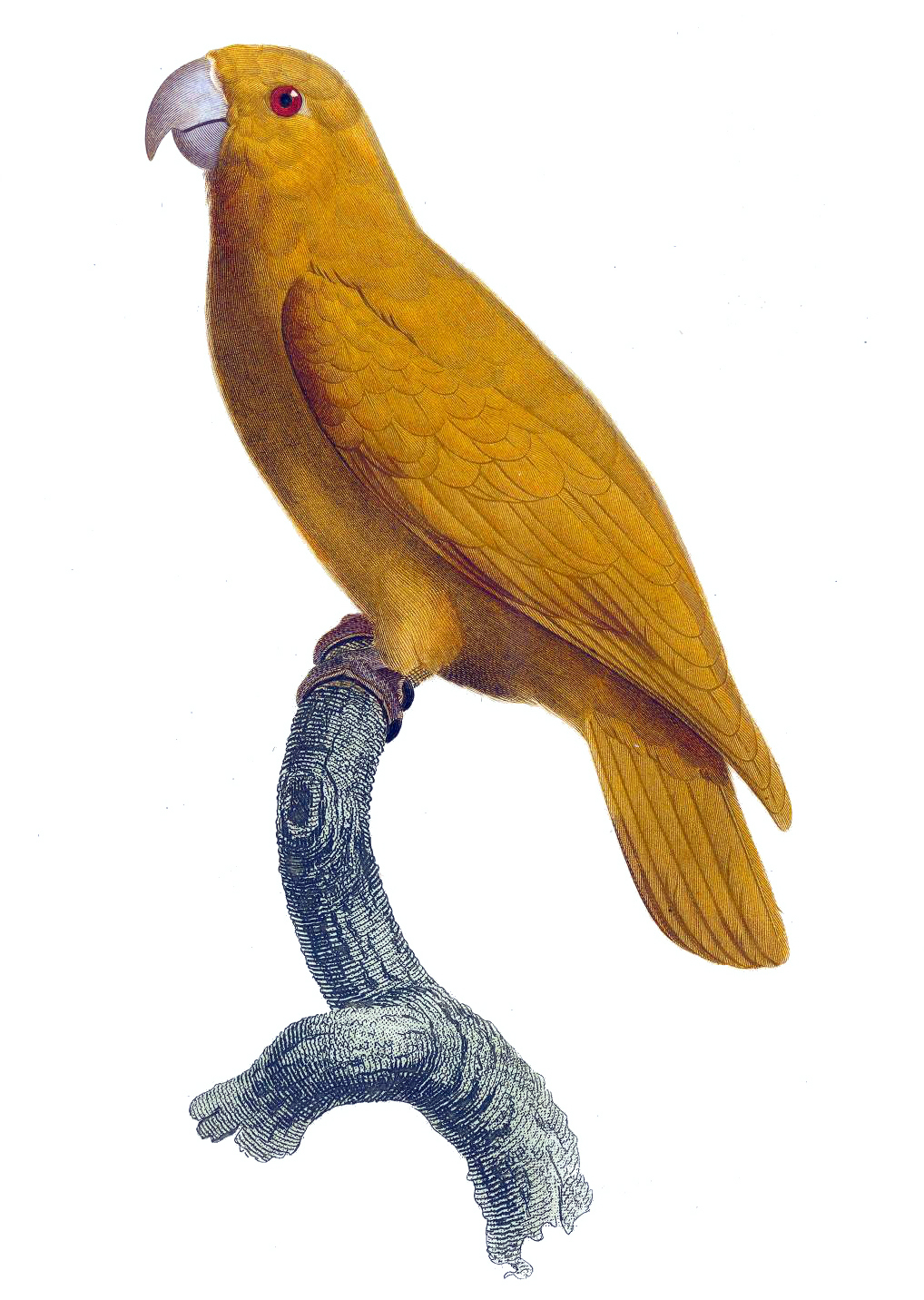
Possibly extinct variety, Geoffroyus aureus
