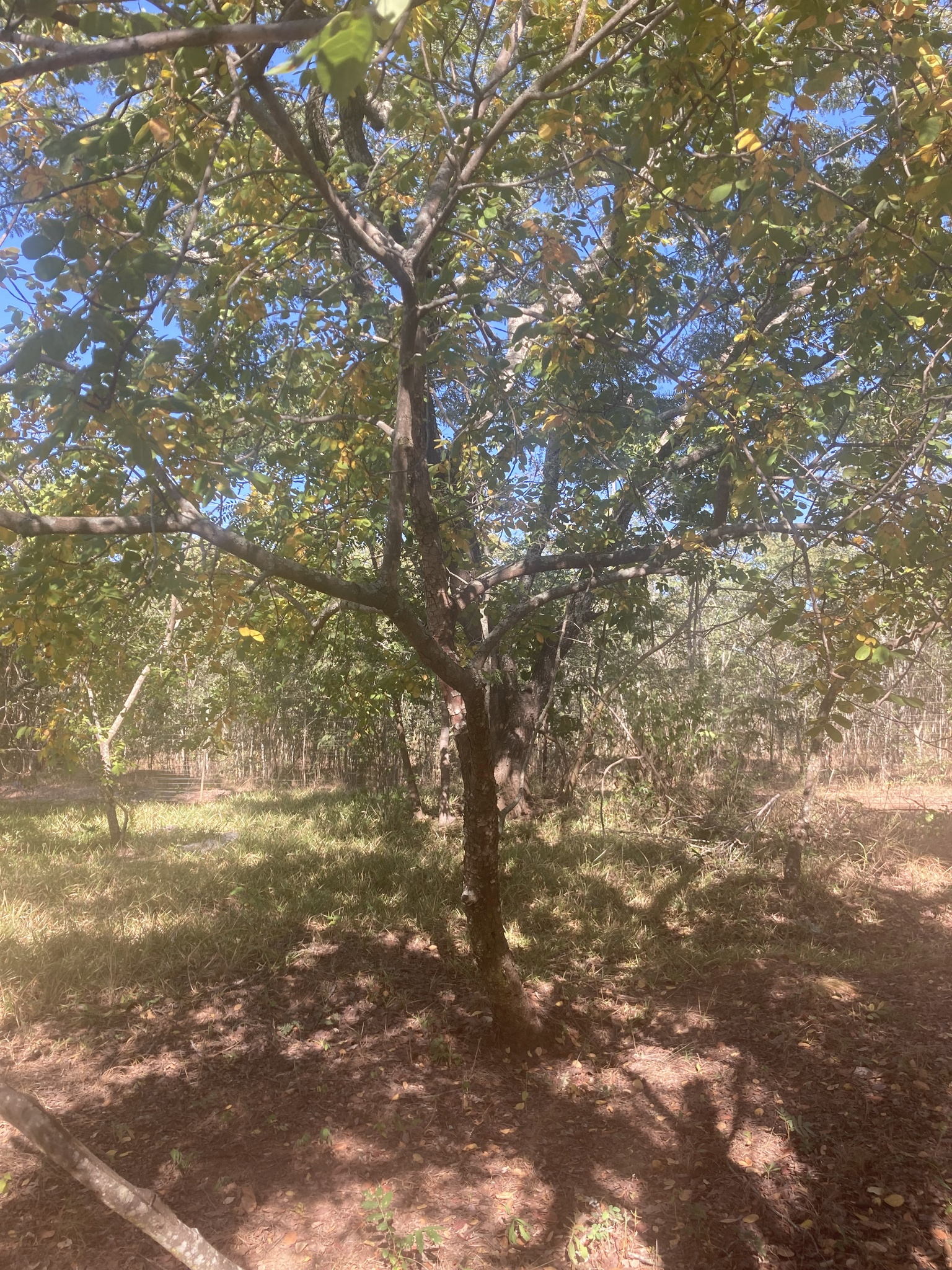
- In Zambia

Scientific classification
- Kingdom: Plantae
- Clade: Embryophytes
- Clade: Tracheophytes
- Clade: Spermatophytes
- Clade: Angiosperms
- Clade: Eudicots
- Clade: Rosids
- Order: Sapindales
- Family: Sapindaceae
- Genus: Zanha
- Species: Z. africana

Binomial name
- Zanha africana (Radlk.) Exell

Synonyms
- Dialiopsis africana Radlk.

= Zanha africana =

Species of flowering plant

Zanha africana, commonly known as the velvet-fruited zanha in English and as mkalya or mkwanga in Swahili, is a species of plant in the family Sapindaceae that is native to Africa. It is used locally for timber and herbal medicine.

== Distribution and habitat ==
Zanha africana is native to Angola, Botswana, the Democratic Republic of the Congo, Kenya, Malawi, Mozambique, Namibia, Tanzania, Zambia, and Zimbabwe. It grows in open woodlands, including those on granite ridges or kopjes, and in riparian forests at altitudes of 600–1,550 m (1,970–5,090 ft).

== Description ==
Zanha africana is a shrub or small tree growing to 12–17 m (39–56 ft) tall. The trunk is cylindrical, sometime crooked, growing up to 100 cm (39 in) wide. The outer bark is reddish to dark brown and flaky; the inner bark is reddish. The erect branches form an open crown. Young twigs are hairy. The leaves are paripinnate, each bearing between 3 and 8 pairs of leaflets in an opposite arrangement. The leaflets are ovate to elliptic, with a rounded or cordate base and a blunt tip, each measuring 8–15 cm (3.1–5.9 in) by 4–8 cm (1.6–3.1 in). The undersides of the leaflets are reddish-brown and hairy. The leaflets are borne on 1–3 mm (0.039–0.118 in) long petiolules. The petioles measure 1–5 cm (0.39–1.97 in) long, forming a 4–34 cm (1.6–13.4 in) long rachis. The inflorescence is a panicle, with individual flowers borne on hairy pedicels that measure approximately 2.5 cm (0.98 in) long. The flowers are small, greenish in colour, and sweet-scented. The flowers lack petals, instead having 4 to 6 sepals, each approximately 4 mm (0.16 in) long and fused at the base. This species is dioecious, with male flowers lacking an ovary and female flowers bearing only rudimentary stamens. The ovary is superior with a 2 mm (0.079 in) long style. The stamens number between 4 and 6, each measuring 10 mm (0.39 in) long. The fruit is a yellow to orange drupe, measuring 3 cm (1.2 in) by 2 cm (0.79 in) and covered with a layer of velvety hairs. Seeds are ellipsoid and measure 1.5 cm (0.59 in) by 1 cm (0.39 in).

== Ecology ==
Zanha africana is a deciduous perennial that sheds most of its leaves during the dry season. Flowering occurs from October to December, with fruits maturing from November to January. The fruits are eaten by birds, chimpanzees, and monkeys, and the nectar is valued as a food source for honey bees. Cattle, goats, and sheep browse on the leaves.

== Uses ==
The wood of Zanha africana is hard, durable, and somewhat resistant to attacks by wood-eating insects. Though it is not considered commercially valuable as timber, it is used locally for construction, agricultural implements, firewood, furniture, mine props, shipbuilding, turnery, and railway sleepers. The fruits are eaten by humans, reportedly tasting similar to apricots, but the seeds are believed to be poisonous and eating large quantities of the fruit may cause diarrhoea. Several parts of the plant contain saponins and may be used as substitutes for soap. The bark, leaves, and roots of Z. africana are widely used as herbal medicine for a variety of ailments, including aches and pains, convulsions, fevers, fungal infections, headaches, hypertension, intestinal parasites, nausea, respiratory problems, and sexually transmitted infections.
