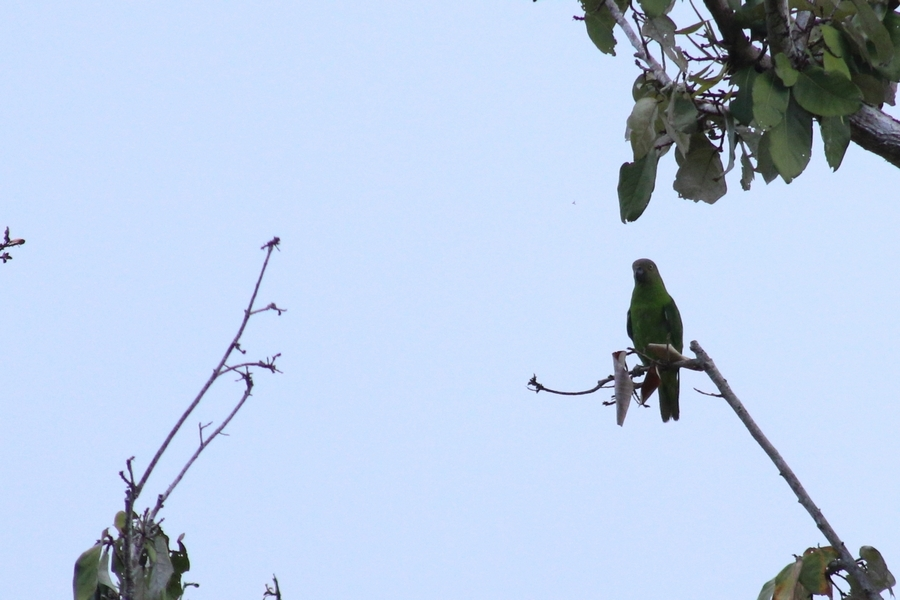

Conservation status
- Least Concern (IUCN 3.1)

Scientific classification
- Kingdom: Animalia
- Phylum: Chordata
- Class: Aves
- Order: Psittaciformes
- Family: Psittaculidae
- Genus: Geoffroyus
- Species: G. heteroclitus

Binomial name
- Geoffroyus heteroclitus (Hombron & Jacquinot, 1841)

= Song parrot =

Species of bird

The song parrot or singing parrot (Geoffroyus heteroclitus) is a species of parrot in the family Psittaculidae.

== Overview ==
Song parrot is found in the Bismarck Archipelago and on Bougainville Island in Papua New Guinea, and in the Solomon Islands except Rennel. Its natural habitat is subtropical or tropical moist lowland forests. This species demonstrates a large to small landmass inter-island colonization pattern based on its presence in Molehanua village, Ugi Island.
