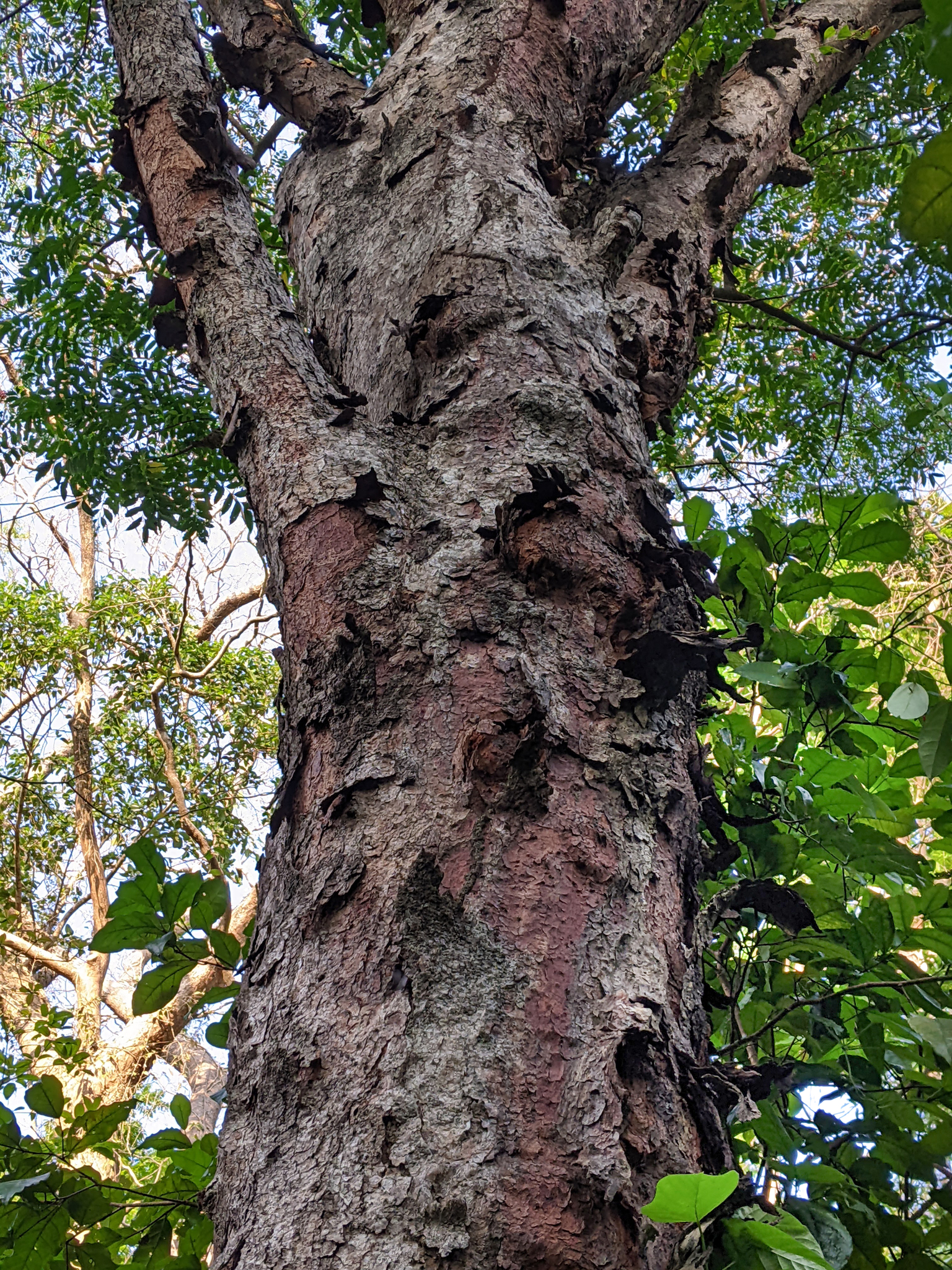
- In the Andaman Islands

Conservation status
- Least Concern (IUCN 3.1)

Scientific classification
- Kingdom: Plantae
- Clade: Tracheophytes
- Clade: Angiosperms
- Clade: Eudicots
- Clade: Rosids
- Order: Sapindales
- Family: Sapindaceae
- Genus: Ganophyllum
- Species: G. falcatum

Binomial name
- Ganophyllum falcatum Blume

= Ganophyllum falcatum =

Species of flowering plants

Ganophyllum falcatum, commonly known as the scaly ash, is an evergreen rainforest tree. It grows up to 32 metres high and has rough, flaky bark. The species was described by German-Dutch botanist Carl Ludwig Blume in 1851 based on plant material collected from the coast of New Guinea.It is native to Africa, the Andaman Islands, Asia, Malesia and northern Australia. The ovoid fruits are consumed by fruit pigeons and cassowaries.
