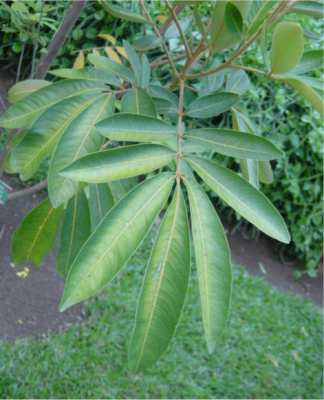
- Cossinia pinnata foliage
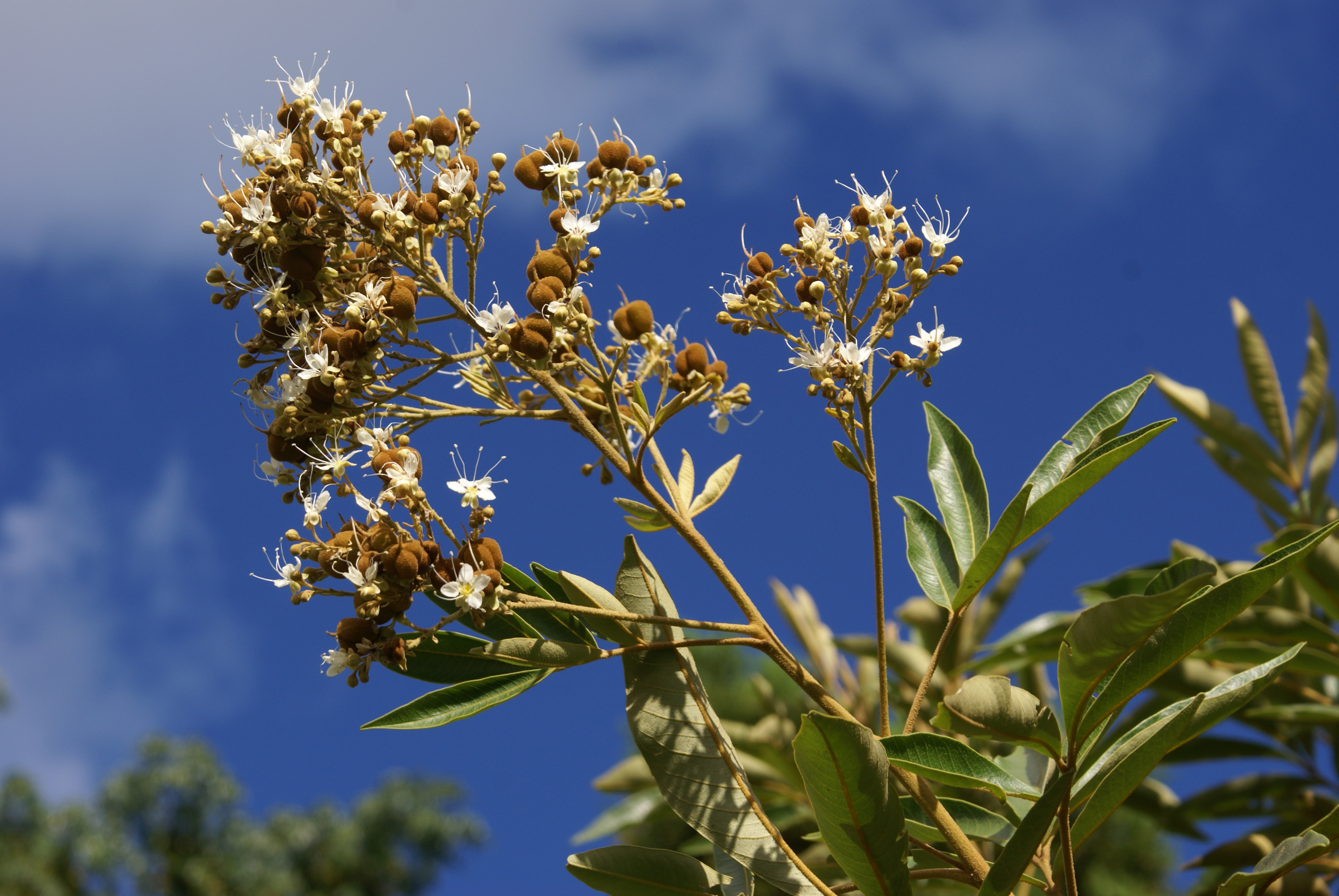
- Cossinia pinnata flowers and developing fruits

Scientific classification
- Kingdom: Plantae
- Clade: Tracheophytes
- Clade: Angiosperms
- Clade: Eudicots
- Clade: Rosids
- Order: Sapindales
- Family: Sapindaceae
- Subfamily: Dodonaeoideae
- Genus: Cossinia; Comm. ex Lam.

Type species
- Cossinia pinnata Lam.

Species
- See text

Synonyms
- Melicopsidium Baill.

= Cossinia =

Genus of flowering plants

Cossinia is a genus of four species of rainforest trees, constituting part of the plant family Sapindaceae. The genus has a disjunct distribution, occurring in Mascarene Islands, Australia, New Caledonia and Fiji.

They grow naturally in rainforests, including seasonally drought–prone rainforests, and associated non–fire–adapted vegetation types.

Cossinia trifoliata trees, endemic to New Caledonia, have become vulnerable to global extinction according to the International Union for Conservation of Nature (IUCN)'s 1998 assessment.

Cossinia australiana trees, endemic to restricted habitat areas of central-eastern and southeastern Queensland, Australia, have the official national and Queensland state governments' "endangered" conservation status. Within their known endemic region the trees grow naturally in habitats which have historically had their native vegetation extensively destroyed and as of 2013 have been further threatened.

== Naming and classification ==
The genus was first described in 1786 by Jean-Baptiste Lamarck in Encyclopédie Méthodique: Botanique. The publication includes descriptions of the species Cossinia pinnata and C. triphylla, named earlier by Philibert Commerson.

In 1982 Australian botanist Sally T. Reynolds formally described the new species name Cossinia australiana, recognised that C. triphylla is a synonym of C. pinnata and updated Ludwig A. T. Radlkofer's species identification key to include all four currently accepted species.

== Species ==
- Cossinia australiana S.T.Reynolds – central–eastern to southeastern Queensland endemic, Australia
- Cossinia pacifica A.C.Sm. – Fiji endemic
- Cossinia pinnata Comm. ex Lam., syn.: C. triphylla Comm. ex Lam. – Réunion and Mauritius –Mascarene Islands endemic (Indian Ocean)
- Cossinia trifoliata (Baill.) Radlk., syn.: Melicopsidium trifoliatum Baill. – New Caledonia endemic – Vulnerable
