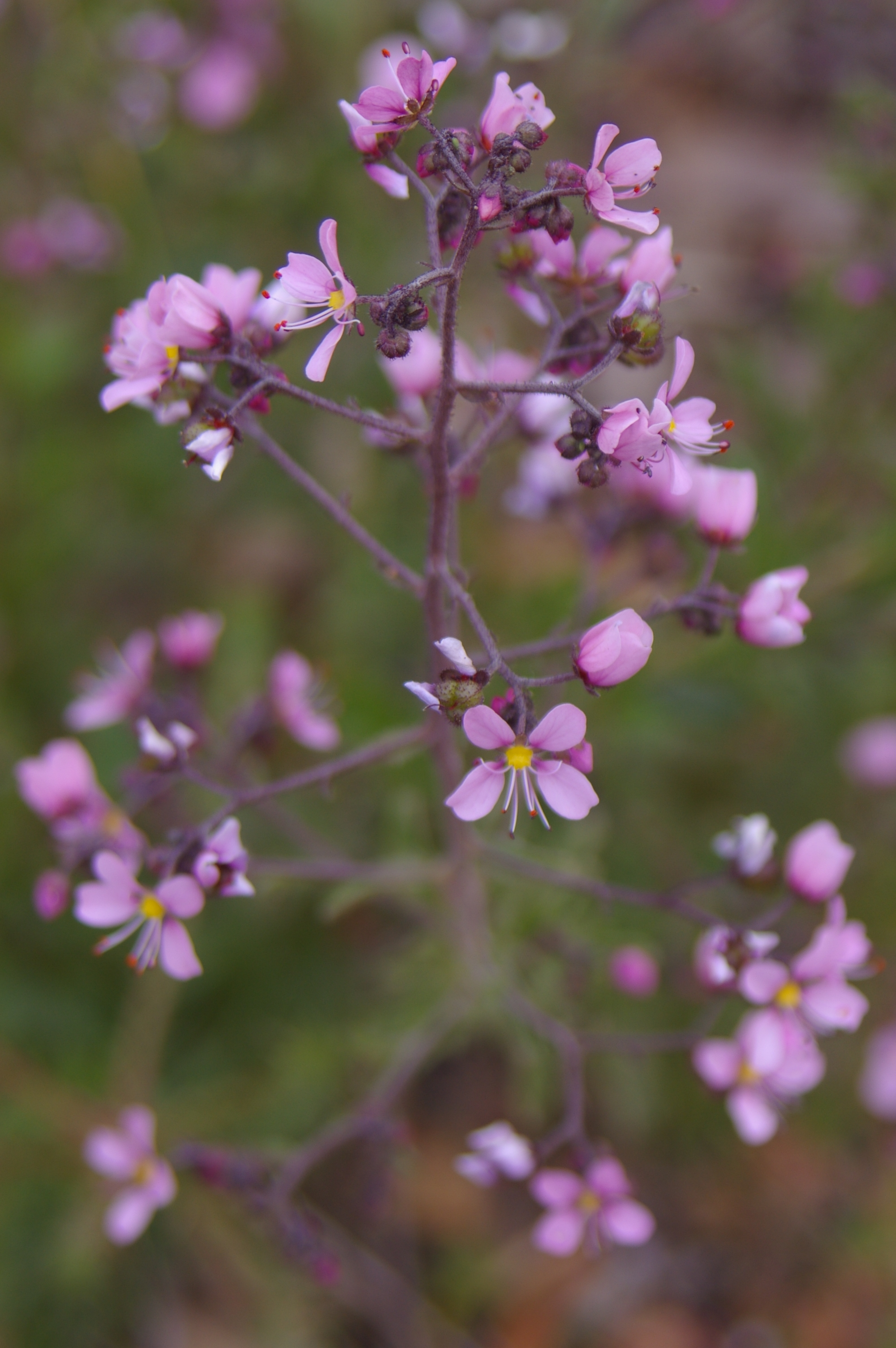
- Diplopeltis huegelii

Scientific classification
- Kingdom: Plantae
- Clade: Tracheophytes
- Clade: Angiosperms
- Clade: Eudicots
- Clade: Rosids
- Order: Sapindales
- Family: Sapindaceae
- Subfamily: Dodonaeoideae
- Genus: Diplopeltis; Endl.

Species
- See text

= Diplopeltis =

Genus of flowering plants

Diplopeltis, commonly known as pepperflower, is a genus of flowering plants in the family Sapindaceae. Species include:

- Diplopeltis eriocarpa (Benth.) Hemsl. - hairy pepperflower
- Diplopeltis huegelii Endl.
- Diplopeltis intermedia A.S.George
- Diplopeltis petiolaris Benth.
- Diplopeltis stuartii F.Muell. - desert pepperflower
