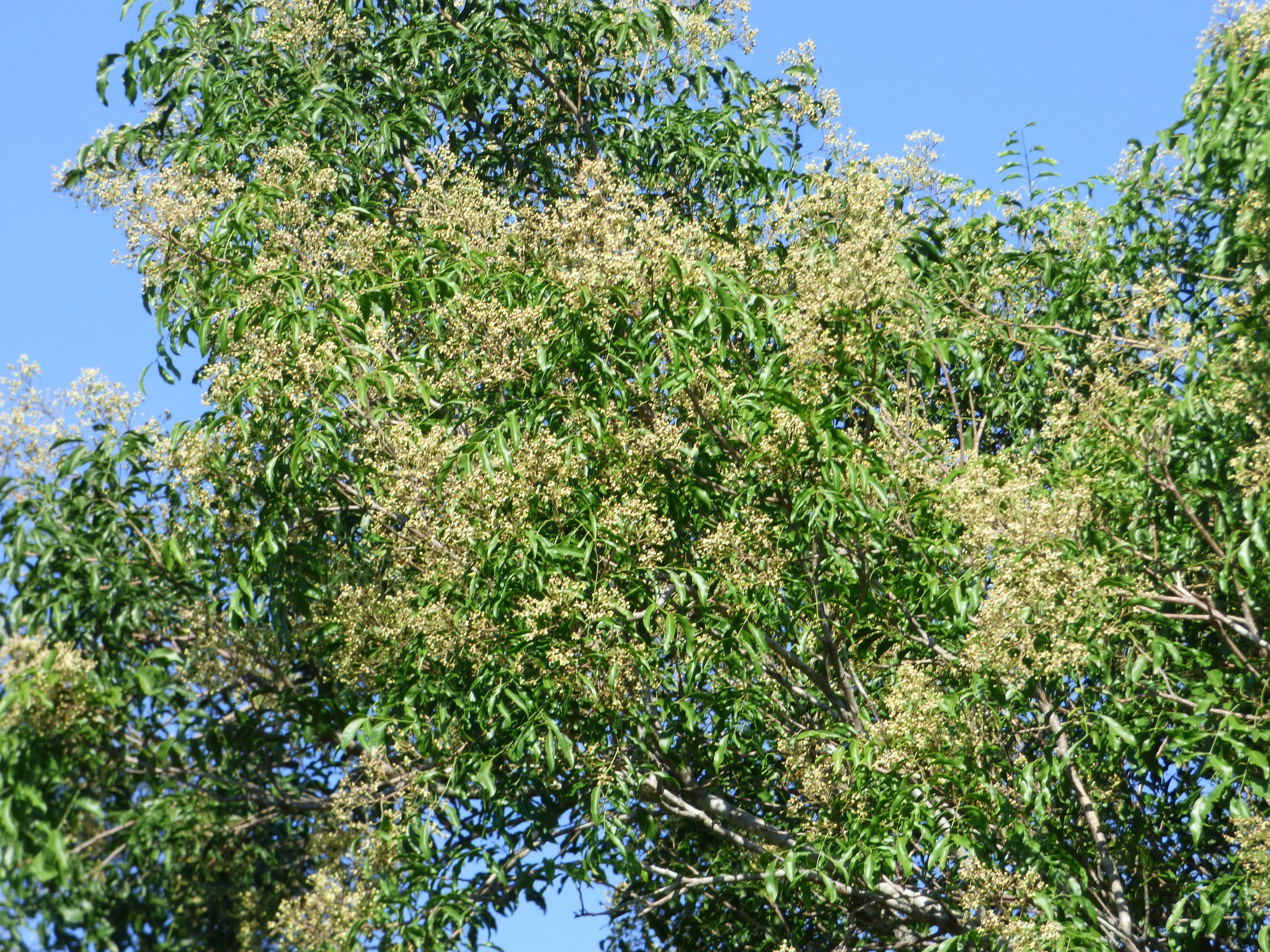
- Diplokeleba floribunda in Argentina

Scientific classification
- Kingdom: Plantae
- Clade: Tracheophytes
- Clade: Angiosperms
- Clade: Eudicots
- Clade: Rosids
- Order: Sapindales
- Family: Sapindaceae
- Genus: Diplokeleba; N.E.Br.

= Diplokeleba =

Genus of plants

Diplokeleba is a genus of flowering plants belonging to the family Sapindaceae.

Its native range is Bolivia to Northeastern Argentina.

Species:

- Diplokeleba floribunda N.E.Br.
- Diplokeleba herzogii Radlk.
