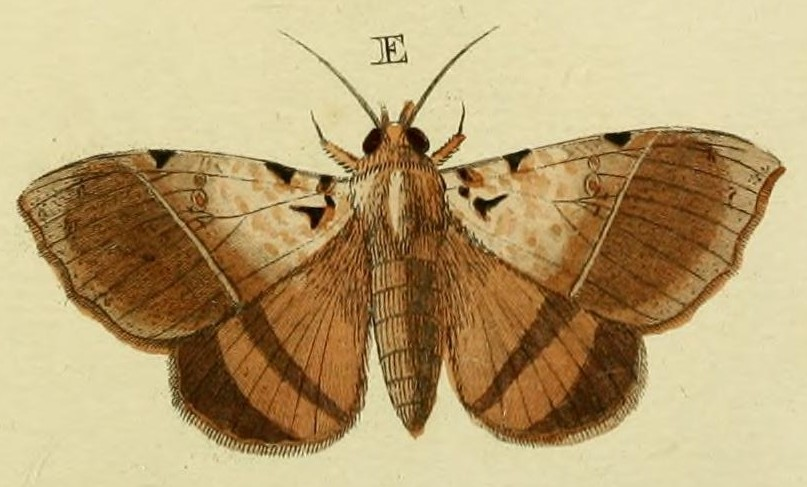

Scientific classification
- Kingdom: Animalia
- Phylum: Arthropoda
- Clade: Pancrustacea
- Class: Insecta
- Order: Lepidoptera
- Superfamily: Noctuoidea
- Family: Erebidae
- Genus: Serrodes
- Species: S. partita

Binomial name
- Serrodes partita (Fabricius, 1775)

Synonyms
- Noctua partita Fabricius 1775; Ophiodes basisignum Walker, 1858; Phalaena inara Cramer, 1780; Phoberia korana Felder & Rogenhofer, 1874

= Serrodes partita =

Catapult moth

Species of moth

Serrodes partita, the catapult moth, is a moth of the family Erebidae. The species was first described by Johan Christian Fabricius in 1775. It is found in western, eastern, central, and southern Africa, India, Indonesia (Borneo, Java) and Sri Lanka.

== Description ==
The wingspan of the adults is approximately 60 mm. The head, thorax, and forewings are dark, red, or greyish brown—with a sub-basal dark red-brown spot on the costa, with a line from its lower edge. A similar antemedial area and large lunule are found below the cell with a highly excurved line from its lower edge. Reniform is broken up into several tessellated spots with pale edges and rufous marks on the costa above it. A double straight postmedial line angled below the costa. The abdomen and hindwings are fuscous. Hindwings have traces of a medial pale line. Cilia paler at the apex and anal angle.

They feed on plants such as Prunus persica, Sapindus saponaria, Sapindus trifoliatus, Pappea capensis, Sapindus saponica, Grewia occidentalis, Citrus, Deinbollia oblongifolia, Acacia, Deinbollia pinnata, Eucalyptus blobulus, and Leptospermum laevigatum.

== See also ==
- Cutworm
