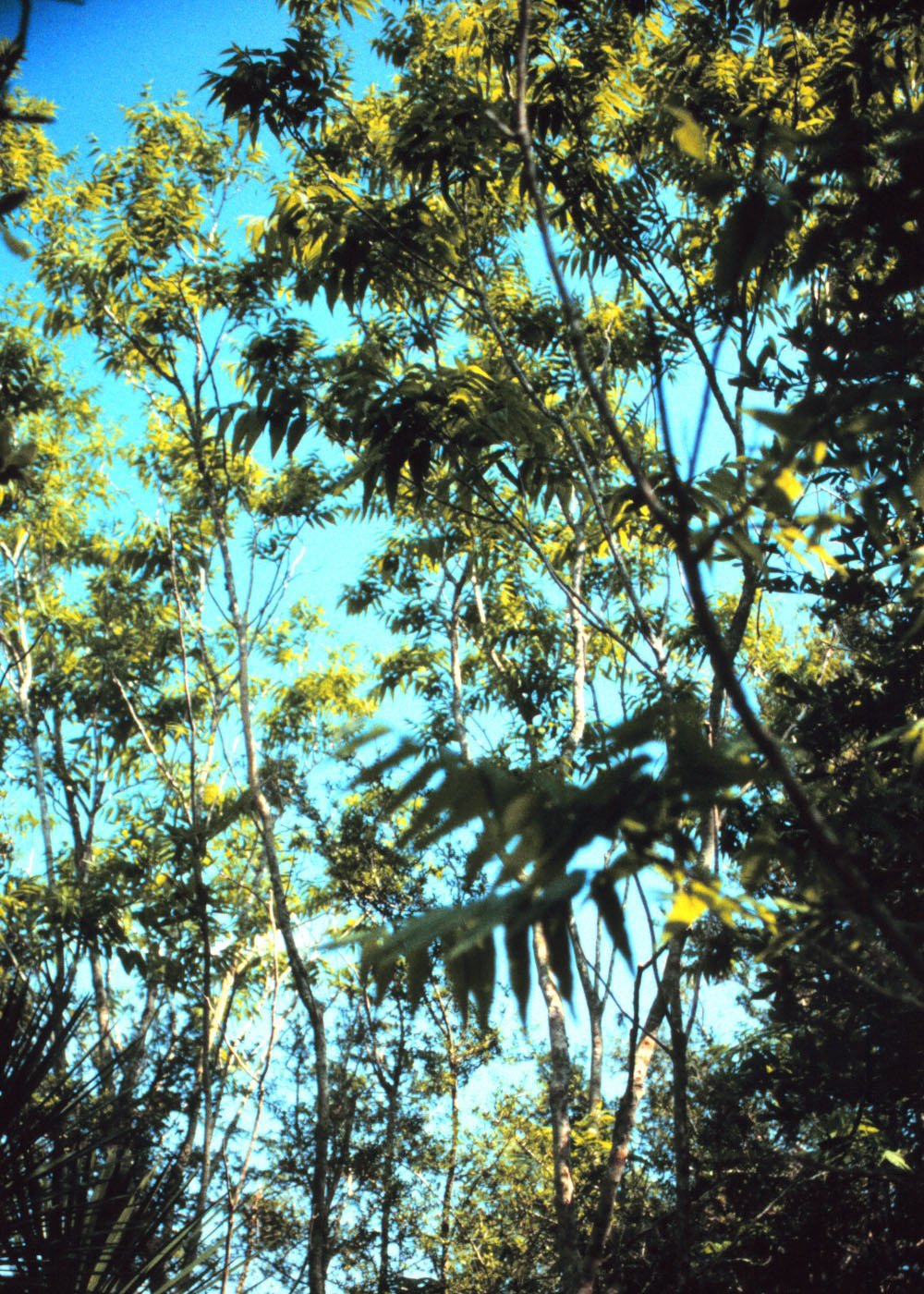
- Sapindus marginatus shrubs

Scientific classification
- Kingdom: Plantae
- Clade: Tracheophytes
- Clade: Angiosperms
- Clade: Eudicots
- Clade: Rosids
- Order: Sapindales
- Family: Sapindaceae
- Tribe: Sapindeae
- Genus: Sapindus; L.

Type species
- Sapindus saponaria L.

Species
- See text

Synonyms
- Didymococcus Blume; Dittelasma Hook.f.; Electra Noronha

= Sapindus =

Genus of flowering plants in the lychee family

Sapindus is a genus of about thirteen species of shrubs and small trees in the maple and lychee family, Sapindaceae and tribe Sapindeae. It is native to warm temperate to tropical regions of the world. The genus includes both deciduous and evergreen species. Members of the genus are commonly known as soapberries or soapnuts because the pulp of the fruit is used to make soap and shampoo. The generic name is derived from the Latin words sapo, meaning "soap", and indicus, meaning "of India".

The leaves are alternate, 15–40 cm (5.9–15.7 in) long, pinnate (except in S. oahuensis, which has simple leaves), with 14–30 leaflets, the terminal leaflet often absent. The flowers form in large panicles, each flower small, creamy white. The fruit is a small leathery-skinned drupe 1–2 cm (0.4–0.8 in) in diameter, yellow ripening blackish, containing one seed. Fossils date back to the Cretaceous.

== Ecology ==
Sapindus species are used as food plants by the larvae of some Lepidoptera (moths and butterflies) species including Endoclita malabaricus. Kernel extracts of soapnut disrupt the activity of enzymes of larvae and pupae and inhibit the growth of the mosquito Aedes aegypti, an important vector of viral diseases.

== Uses ==
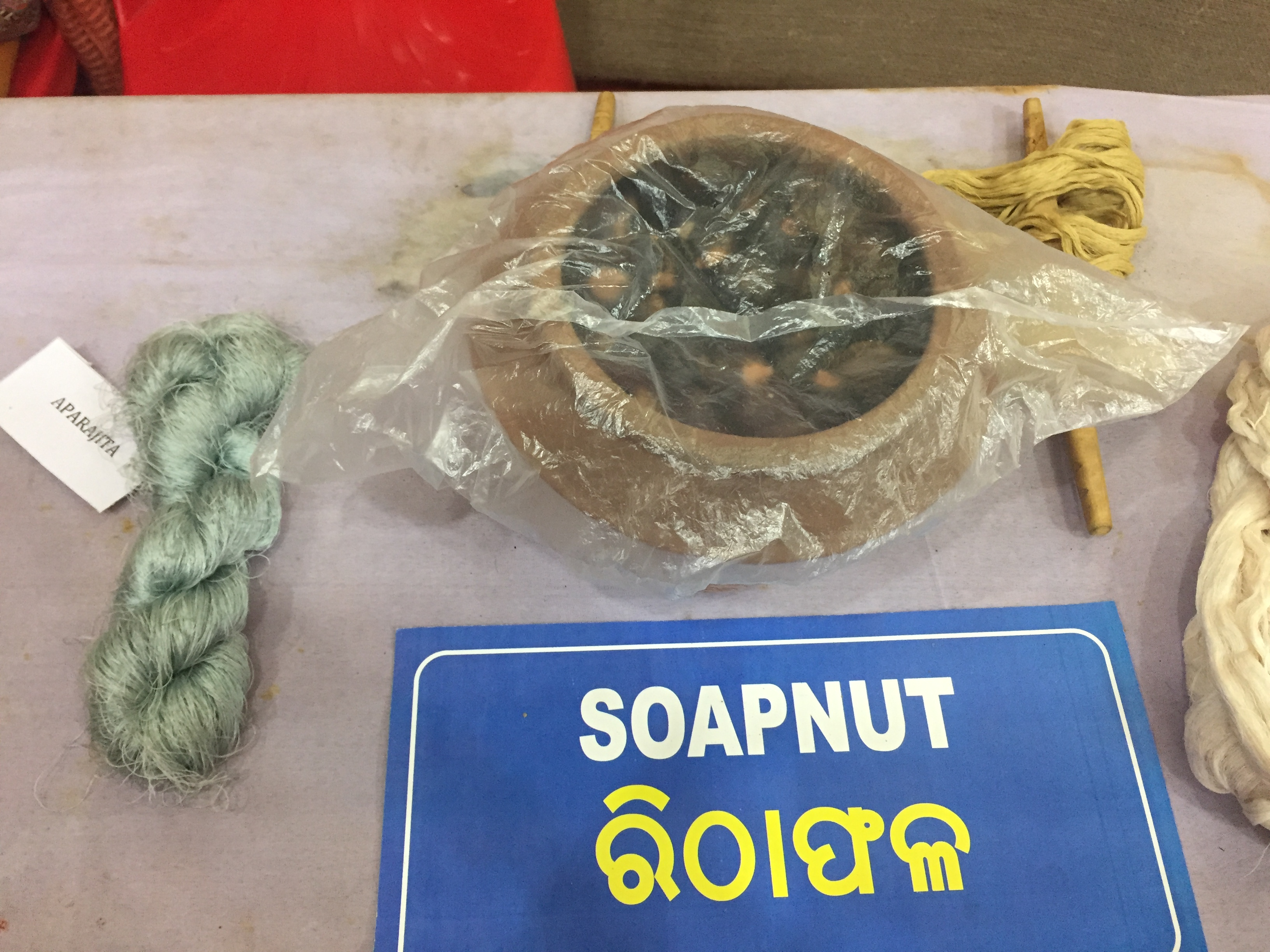
Soapnut is used with natural dyes to color the yarn of Tasar silk.

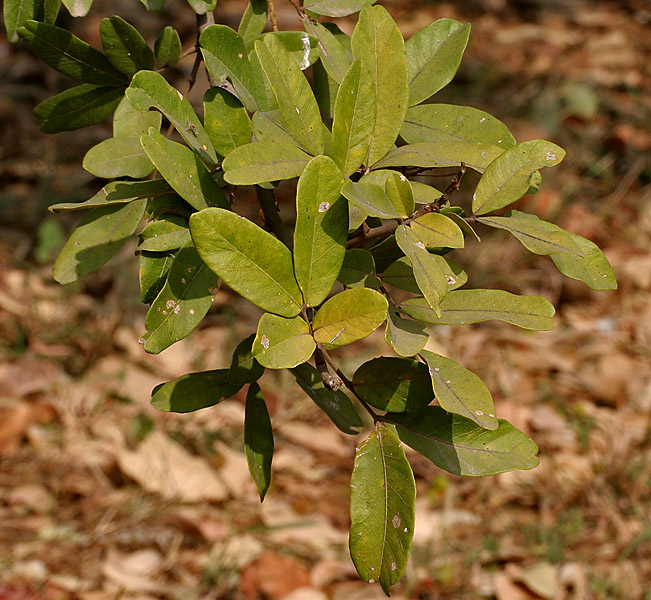
Sapindus emarginatus leaves, India

The drupes (soapnuts) contain saponins, which have surfactant properties, being used for washing by ancient Asian and American peoples. A number of other uses for Sapindus have also been reported such as making arrows from the wood and decorative objects from the seeds.

=== Folk medicine ===
Leaf and fruit extracts of Sapindus have historically been used in folk remedies to treat various conditions.

=== Dyeing process ===
Soapnut is used as a scouring agent for preparation of coloring fibers such as the yarn of Tussar silk and cotton.

== Species ==
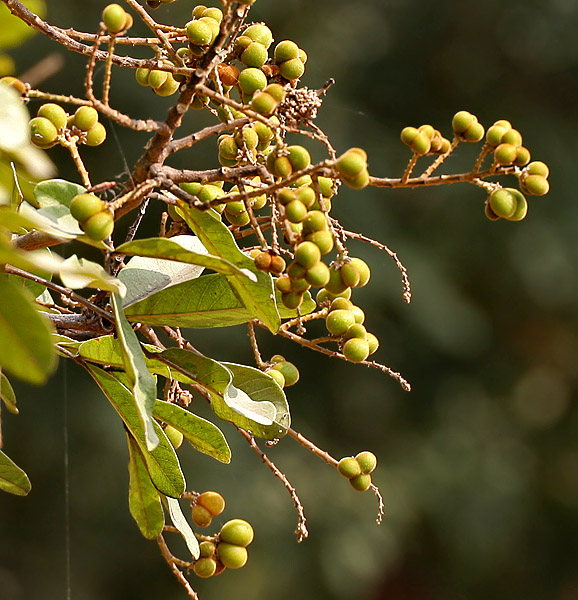
Sapindus emarginatus drupes in Hyderabad, India

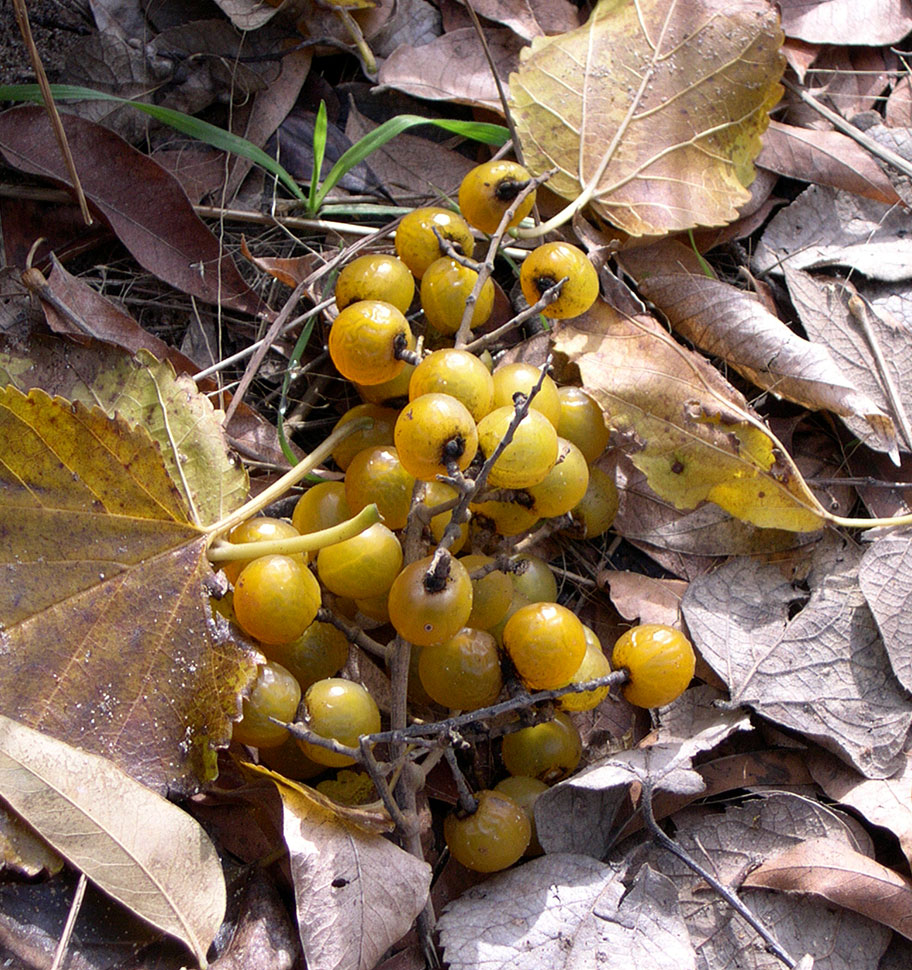
Sapindus drummondii, the Western Soapberry: drupes

As of March 2026, Plants of the World Online includes 20 species:

- Sapindus balicus Radlk.
- Sapindus chrysotrichus Gagnep.
- Sapindus delavayi (Franch.) Radlk.
- Sapindus drummondii Hook. & Arn.
- Sapindus emarginatus Vahl
- Sapindus marginatus Willd.
- Sapindus marikuru A.R.Franck
- Sapindus motu-koita A.R.Franck
- Sapindus mukorossi Gaertn.
- Sapindus oahuensis Hillebr. ex Radlk.
- Sapindus oocarpus Radlk.
- Sapindus rarak DC.
- Sapindus saponaria L.
- Sapindus sonlaensis H.M.Tam, N.K.Khoi, N.T.Cuong & T.B.Tran
- Sapindus standleyi A.R.Franck
- Sapindus thurstonii Rock
- Sapindus tomentosus Kurz
- Sapindus tricarpus (Blanco) A.R.Franck
- Sapindus trifoliatus L.
- Sapindus vitiensis A.Gray

=== Formerly placed here ===
- Lepisanthes fruticosa (Roxb.) Leenh. (as S. fruticosus Roxb.)
- Lepisanthes senegalensis (Juss. ex Poir.) Leenh. (as S. senegalensis Juss. ex Poir.)
- Lepisanthes tetraphylla (Vahl) Radlk. (as S. tetraphylla Vahl)
- Talisia cerasina (Benth.) Radlk. (as S. cerasinus Benth.)
- Talisia esculenta (A.St.-Hil.) Radlk. (as S. esculenta A.St.-Hil.)
