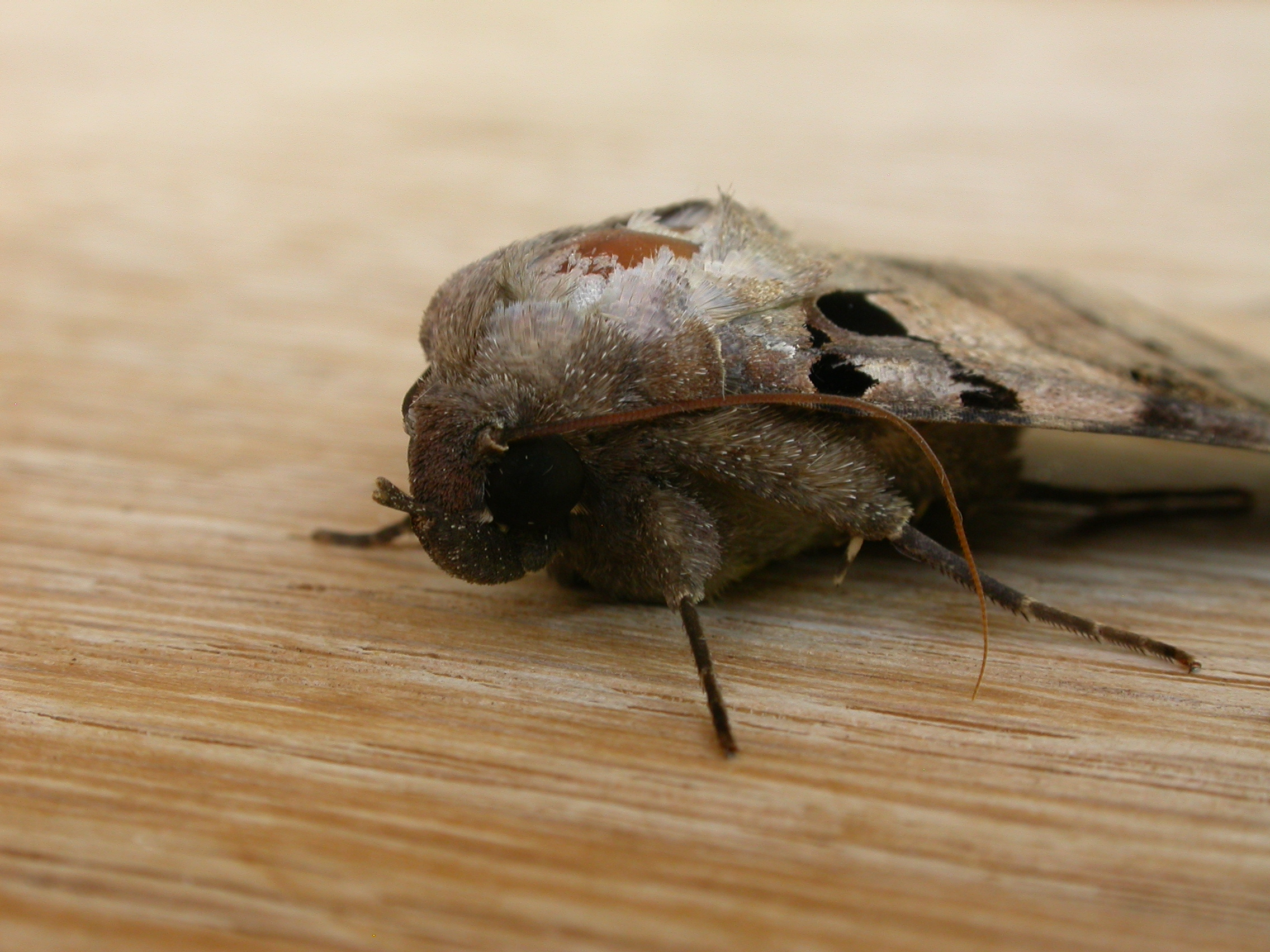

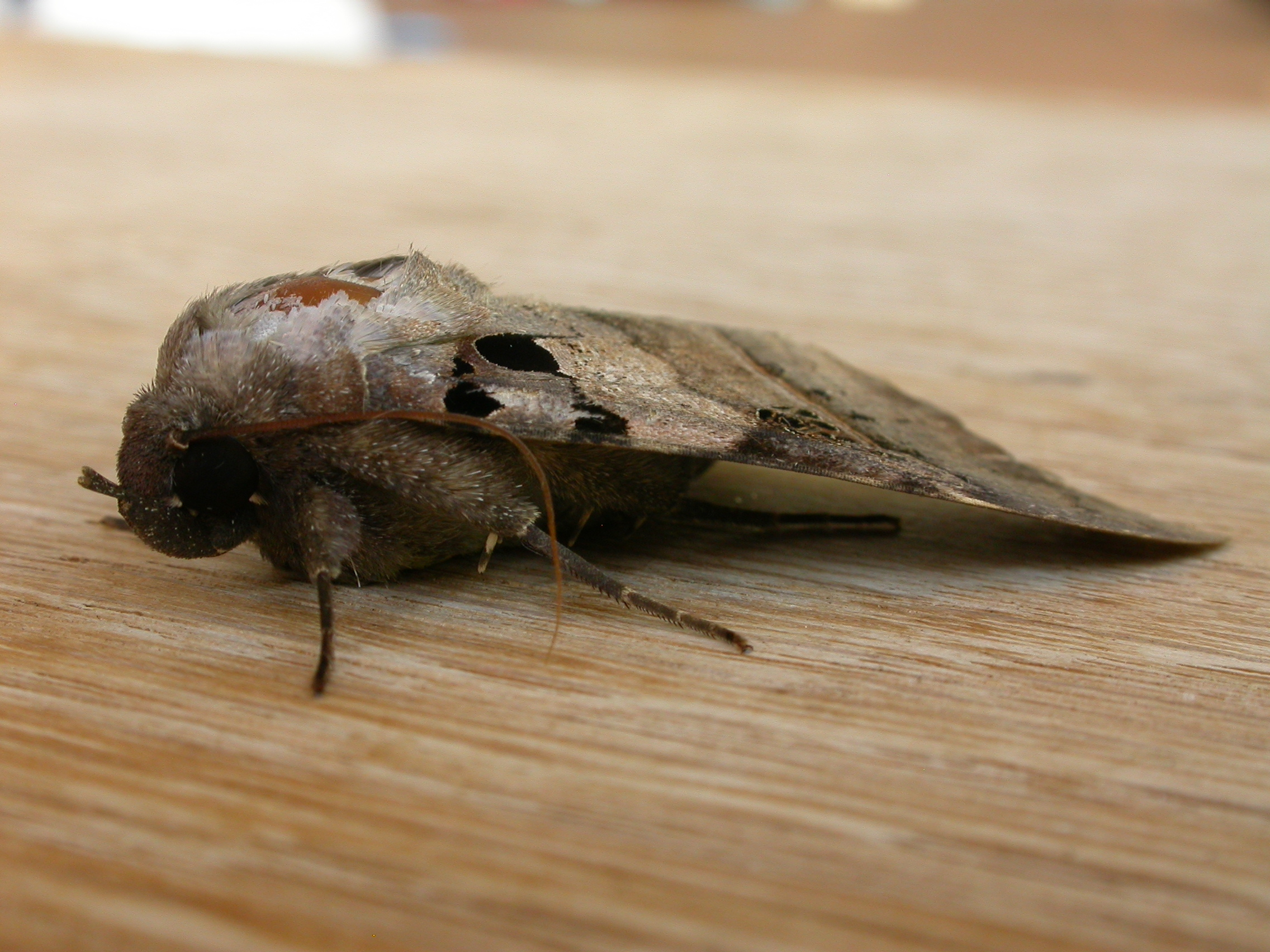

Scientific classification
- Kingdom: Animalia
- Phylum: Arthropoda
- Clade: Pancrustacea
- Class: Insecta
- Order: Lepidoptera
- Superfamily: Noctuoidea
- Family: Erebidae
- Genus: Serrodes
- Species: S. campana

Binomial name
- Serrodes campana Guenée, 1852

Synonyms
- Serrodes nigha Guenée, 1852; Serrodes callipepla Prout, 1929

= Serrodes campana =

Species of moth

Serrodes campana is a species of moth of the family Erebidae first described by Achille Guenée in 1852. It is found from the Indo-Australian tropics to eastern Australia, Fiji, Samoa and New Caledonia. It is also present in Japan, Korea and Sri Lanka. The adult is a fruit piercer, but also feeds on flower nectar.

== Description ==
The wingspan is about 80 mm. Head, thorax and basal and outer area of forewings brown and markings larger than other species. Forewings with a sub-basal dark red-brown spot on the costa, with a line from its lower edge. A similar antemedial spot and large lunule found below the cell with a highly excurved line from its lower edge. Reniform broken up into a number of tessellated spots with pale edges, and with rufous marks on the costa above it. A double straight postmedial line angled below the costa. Abdomen and hindwings are fuscous. Hindwings have traces of a medial pale line. Cilia paler at apex and anal angle.

Larva ochreous blue grey with bluish-black speckles. The first abdominal segment black and swollen. All the legs are ochreous. The larvae feed on Lepisanthes, Nephelium, Sapindus, Schleichera and Acer species.

== Subspecies ==
- Serrodes campana campana
- Serrodes campana callipepla Prout, 1929

== Gallery ==
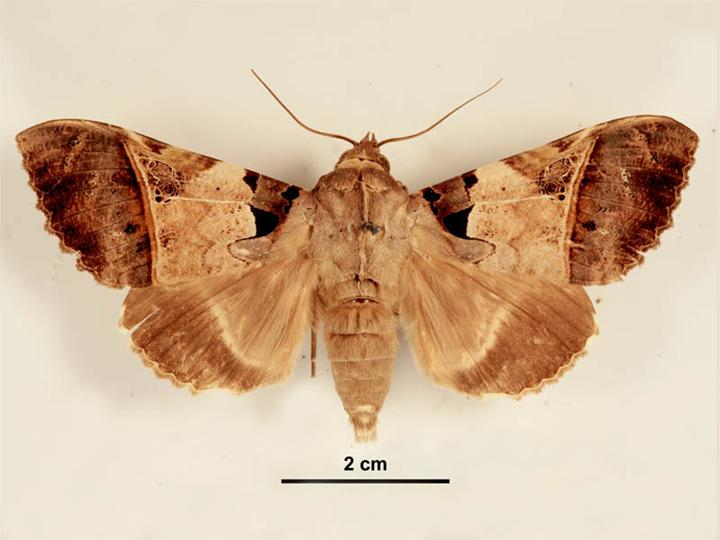
Female, dorsal view

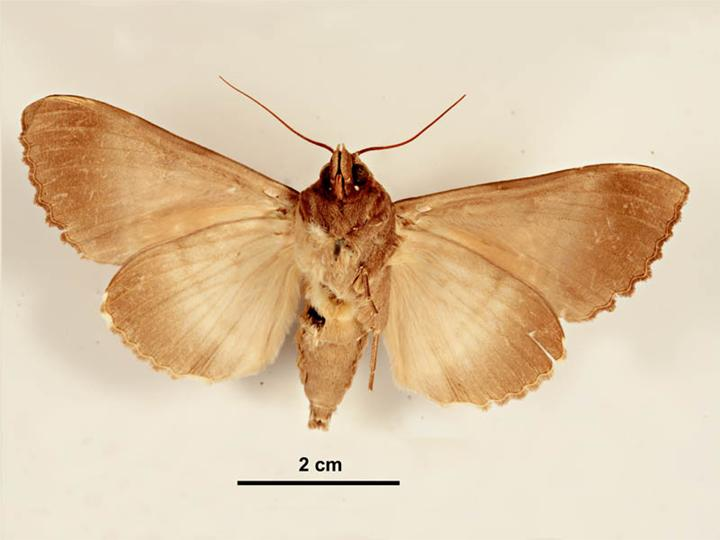
Female, ventral view

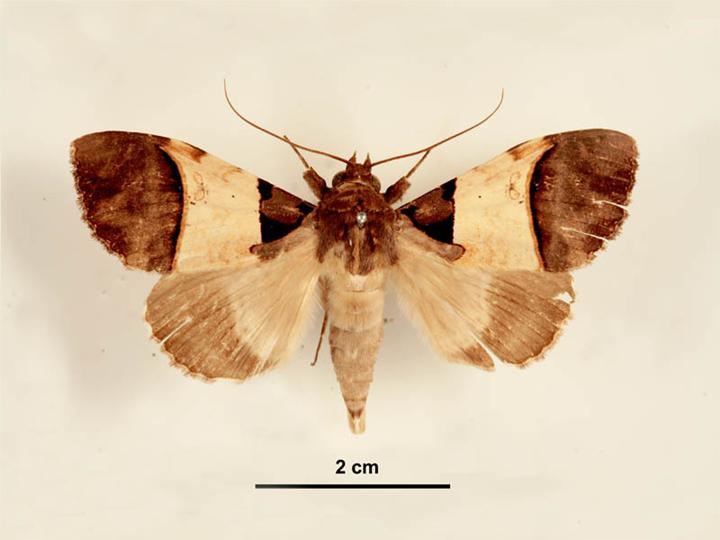
Male, dorsal view

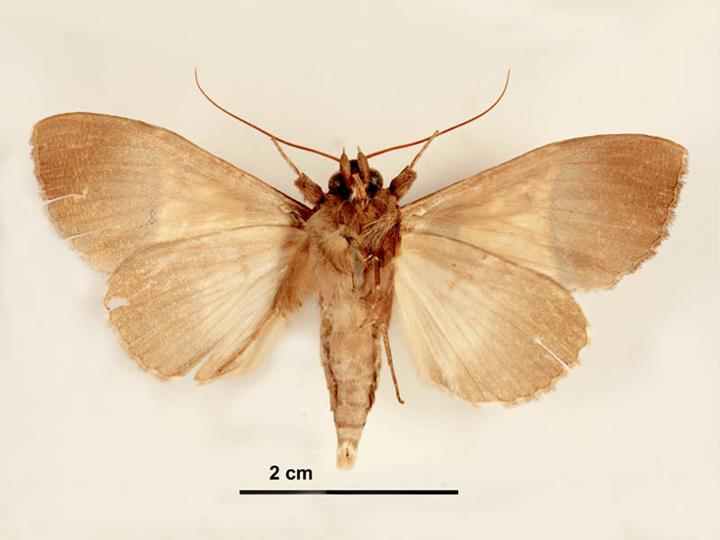
Male, ventral view

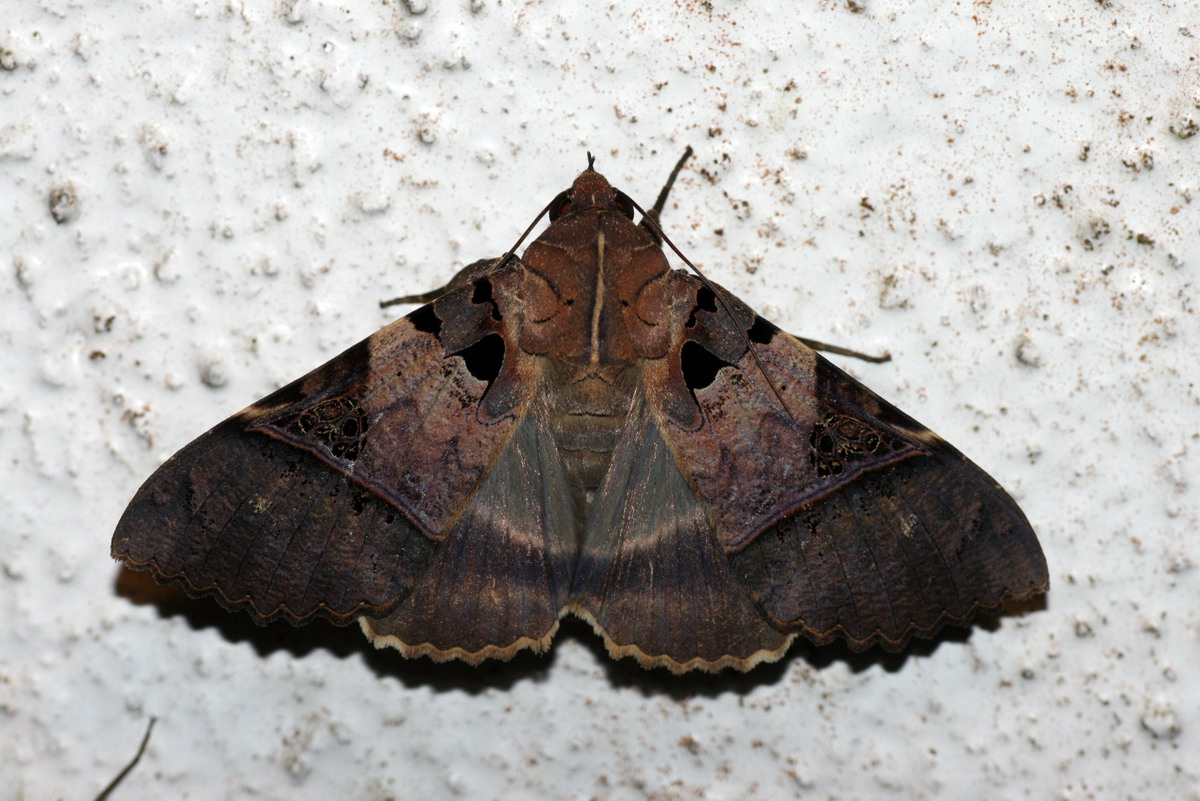

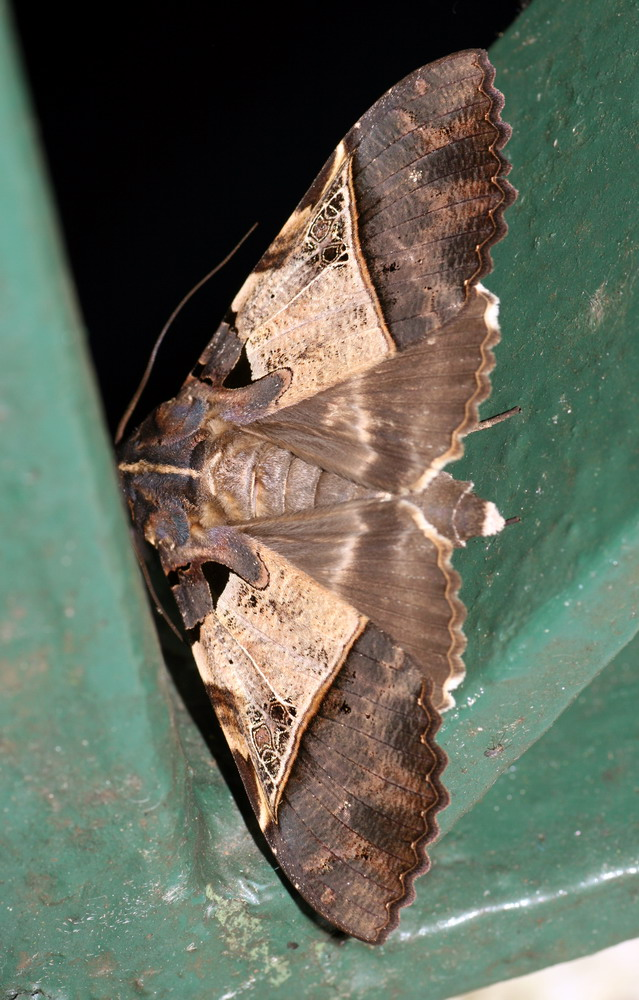
