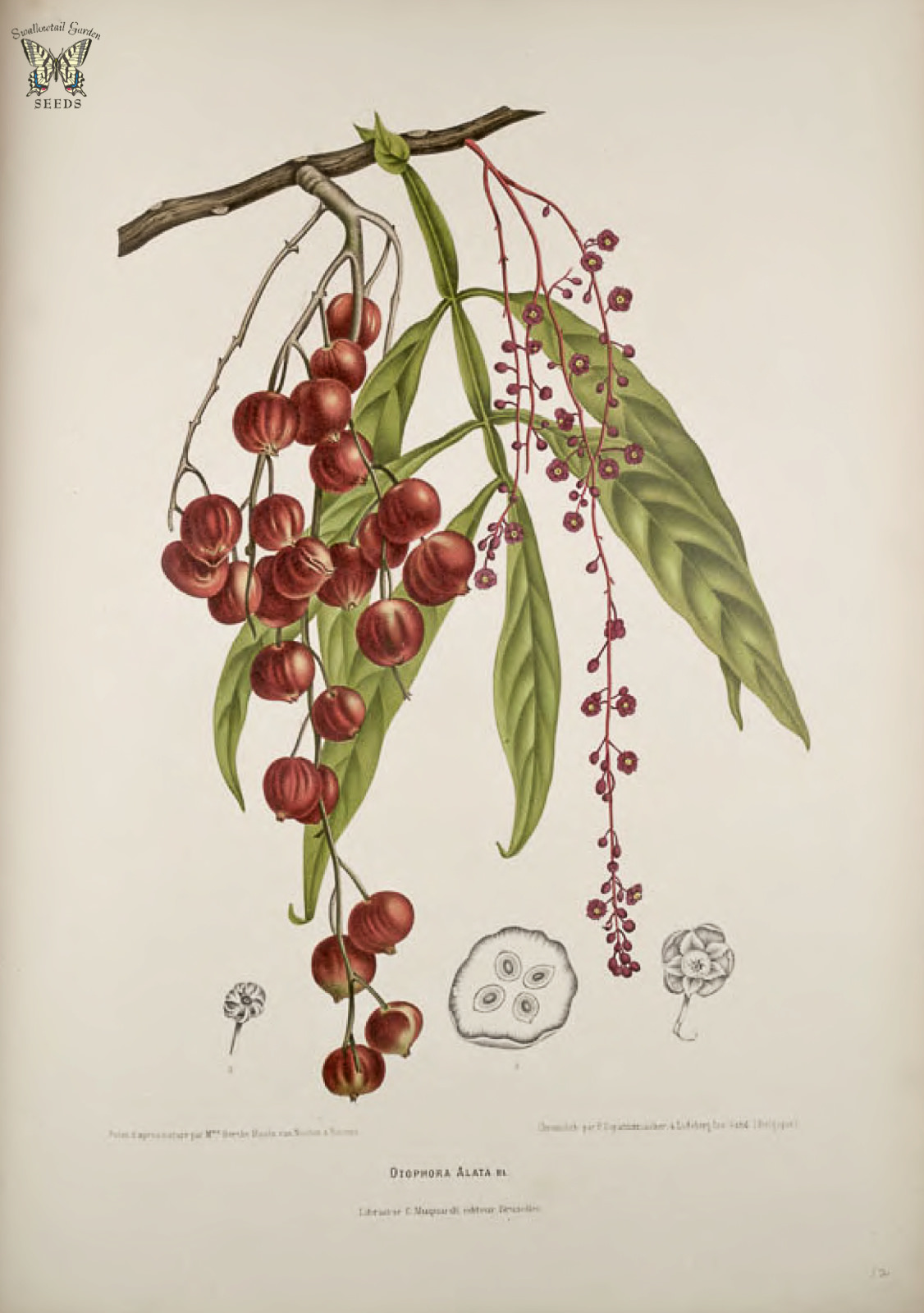
- A drawing of L. alata in Fleurs, fruits et feuillages choisis de l'ille de Java by Berthe Hoola van Nooten

Scientific classification
- Kingdom: Plantae
- Clade: Tracheophytes
- Clade: Angiosperms
- Clade: Eudicots
- Clade: Rosids
- Order: Sapindales
- Family: Sapindaceae
- Genus: Lepisanthes
- Species: L. alata

Binomial name
- Lepisanthes alata (Blume) Leenh.

Synonyms
- Capura alata (Blume) Teijsm. & Binn.; Otolepis alata (Blume) Kuntze; Otophora alata Blume; Otophora edulis C.E.C.Fisch.

= Lepisanthes alata =

Species of flowering plant

Lepisanthes alata, also called the Johore tree, blimbing cina, ceri or engkili, is a species of flowering plant, a tropical forest fruit-tree in the lychee family, that is native to Southeast Asia.

== Description ==
The species grows as a small monoecious tree to 5–15 m in height. The pinnate leaves have 5–13 pairs of usually sessile, lance-shaped to oblong leaflets. The pendulous inflorescences bear wine-red to purple flowers. The glossy oval fruits are drupes 2–4 cm long by 2–3 cm in diameter, red to purple when ripe, each containing two seeds in an edible, sweet, white mesocarp.

== Distribution and habitat ==
The species is found to Borneo. It occurs in mixed hill forest at elevations of up to 1,000 m.
