= Lepisanthes multijuga =

Scientific classification
- Kingdom: Plantae
- Clade: Tracheophytes
- Clade: Angiosperms
- Clade: Eudicots
- Clade: Rosids
- Order: Sapindales
- Family: Sapindaceae
- Genus: Lepisanthes
- Species: L. multijuga

Binomial name
- Lepisanthes multijuga (Hook.f.) Leenh.

Synonyms
- Nephelium multijugum Hook.f.; Otophora multijuga Merr.; Capura multijuga (Hook.f.) Radlk.

Species of flowering plant

Lepisanthes multijuga is a species of flowering plant, a tropical forest fruit-tree in the lychee family, that is native to Southeast Asia.

== Description ==
The species grows as a shrub or small tree, often multistemmed, to 5–12 m in height. The pinnate leaves have 12–30 pairs of sessile, linear to lance-shaped leaflets. The terminal inflorescences bear reddish flowers. The oval fruits are drupes 2–3 cm long by 1.3–2 cm in diameter, yellow to brownish-orange when ripe, each containing one or two seeds in an edible, sweet, translucent mesocarp.

== Distribution and habitat ==
The species is endemic to Borneo. It occurs in mixed hill forest up to an elevation of 1,000 m.
