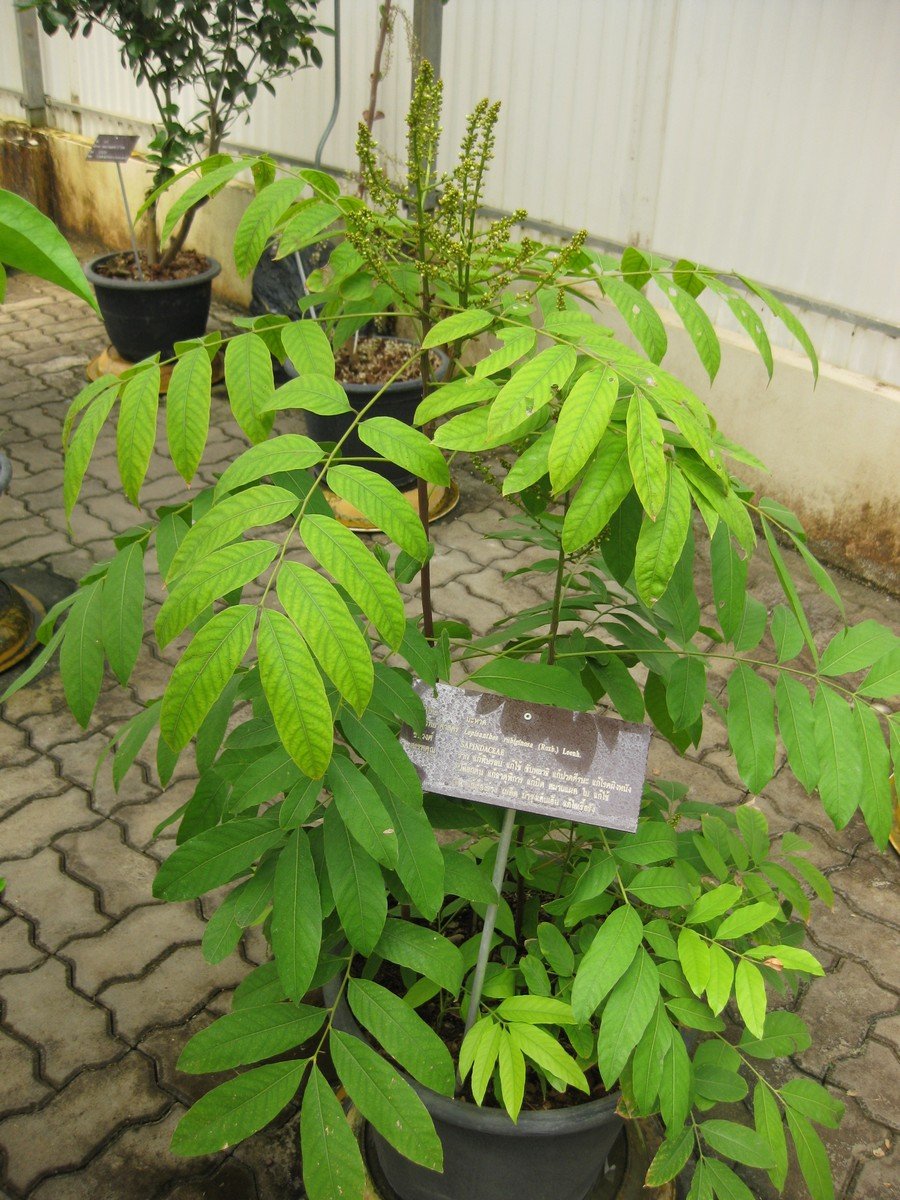

Conservation status
- Least Concern (IUCN 3.1)

Scientific classification
- Kingdom: Plantae
- Clade: Tracheophytes
- Clade: Angiosperms
- Clade: Eudicots
- Clade: Rosids
- Order: Sapindales
- Family: Sapindaceae
- Genus: Lepisanthes
- Species: L. rubiginosa

Binomial name
- Lepisanthes rubiginosa (Blume) Leenh.

Synonyms
- List: Erioglossum edule Blume; Erioglossum rubiginosum Gagnep; Lepisanthes stilaginea Noronha ex Miq.; Lepisanthes stilaginea Noronha ex Cambess.; Lepisanthes edulis Steud.; Lepisanthes rubiginosus Roxb.; Lepisanthes pinnatus Roxb. ex Hiern; Lepisanthes longifolius Buch.-Ham. ex Wight & Arn.; Lepisanthes fraxinifolius DC.; Lepisanthes edulis Bl.; Lepisanthes alternifolius Buch.-Ham. ex Wight & Arn.; Lepisanthes cupanioides Cambess.; Lepisanthes hirta Ridl.; Lepisanthes balansaeana Gagnep.; Lepisanthes rubiginosum Radlk.; Lepisanthes rubiginosum villosum Gagnep.; Lepisanthes rubiginosum (Roxb.) Bl.; Lepisanthes edule Bl.

= Lepisanthes rubiginosa =

Species of plant

Lepisanthes rubiginosa, also known as mertajam, is a plant species in the lychee family found in northern India, Indochina, Malesia and northwest Australia.

== Botany ==
It is a shrub, or small tree, that can grow up to 16 meters tall and has compound leaves with two to nine pairs of leaflets. Its flowers are yellow-white with a sweet scent and its fruit ripens to a dark purple/black. Its name rubiginosa is Latin for rust-coloured referning to the hairs on the twigs and leaflets.

== Use ==
The leaves can be used as a poultice to treat itches or made into a decoction that can be drank to cure fever.
