= Serrodes caesia =

Scientific classification
- Kingdom: Animalia
- Phylum: Arthropoda
- Class: Insecta
- Order: Lepidoptera
- Superfamily: Noctuoidea
- Family: Erebidae
- Genus: Serrodes
- Species: S. caesia

Binomial name
- Serrodes caesia Warren, 1915

Synonyms
- Serrodes curvilinea Prout, 1921; Serrodes curvilinea euryplima Prout, 1926; Serrodes curvilinea javana Roepke, 1941

Species of moth

Serrodes caesia is a moth of the family Erebidae first described by Warren in 1915. It is found in Indonesia (Sumatra, Sulawesi, Buru, Borneo, Java), New Guinea and Thailand. The habitat consists of alluvial forests, dipterocarp forests and primary forests.

== Subspecies ==
- Serrodes caesia caesia (New Guinea)
- Serrodes caesia curvilinea Prout, 1921 (Borneo, Thailand)
- Serrodes caesia euryplima Prout, 1926 (Buru)
- Serrodes caesia javana Roepke, 1941 (Java)
