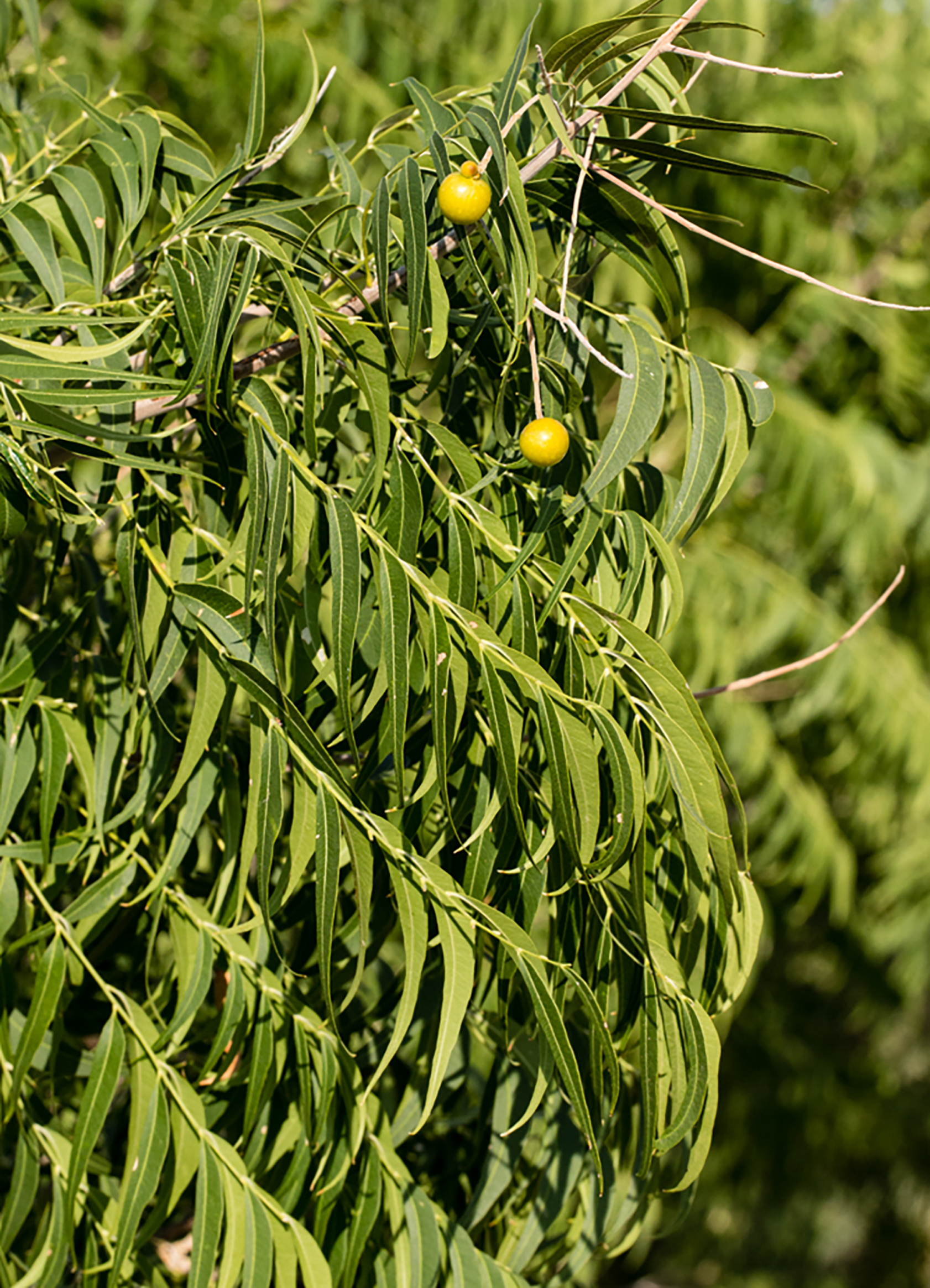

Scientific classification
- Kingdom: Plantae
- Clade: Tracheophytes
- Clade: Angiosperms
- Clade: Eudicots
- Clade: Rosids
- Order: Sapindales
- Family: Sapindaceae
- Subfamily: Sapindoideae
- Tribe: Sapindeae
- Genus: Sapindus
- Species: S. drummondii

Binomial name
- Sapindus drummondii Hook. & Arn., 1838

Synonyms
- Sapindus saponaria var. drummondii (Hook. & Arn.) L.D.Benson; Sapindus saponaria subsp. drummondii (Hook. & Arn.) A.E.Murray; Rhus florita M.E.Jones (heterotypic)

= Sapindus drummondii =

Species of plant

Sapindus drummondii is a valid species (it was thought to be synonymous with Sapindus saponaria) of shrubs in the tribe Sapindeae. It has been recorded from Arizona to SE. Colorado and Louisiana and grows primarily in the temperate biome.
