= Serrodes villosipeda =

Scientific classification
- Domain: Eukaryota
- Kingdom: Animalia
- Phylum: Arthropoda
- Class: Insecta
- Order: Lepidoptera
- Superfamily: Noctuoidea
- Family: Erebidae
- Genus: Serrodes
- Species: S. villosipeda

Binomial name
- Serrodes villosipeda Strand, 1910

Species of moth

Serrodes villosipeda is a moth of the family Erebidae. It is found in Indonesia (Sumatra).
