= Lepisanthes unilocularis =

Conservation status
- Extinct (IUCN 2.3)

Scientific classification
- Kingdom: Plantae
- Clade: Tracheophytes
- Clade: Angiosperms
- Clade: Eudicots
- Clade: Rosids
- Order: Sapindales
- Family: Sapindaceae
- Genus: Lepisanthes
- Species: †L. unilocularis

Binomial name
- †Lepisanthes unilocularis Leenh.

Synonyms
- Otophora unilocularis (Leenh.) H.S.Lo

Extinct species of flowering plant

Lepisanthes unilocularis is a species of plant in the family Sapindaceae. It is endemic to China. It was considered extinct until its rediscovery in 2018.
