= Sapindus chrysotrichus =

Scientific classification
- Kingdom: Plantae
- Clade: Embryophytes
- Clade: Tracheophytes
- Clade: Angiosperms
- Clade: Eudicots
- Clade: Rosids
- Order: Sapindales
- Family: Sapindaceae
- Subfamily: Sapindoideae
- Tribe: Sapindeae
- Genus: Sapindus
- Species: S. chrysotrichus

Binomial name
- Sapindus chrysotrichus Gagnep., 1947

Species of tree native to Vietnam

Sapindus chrysotrichus is a tree species in the family Sapindaceae and tribe Sapindeae described by François Gagnepain in 1947. This species is restricted to southern Vietnam, where it grows primarily in the seasonal tropical forest biome.

== Description ==
Known in Vietnam as Chét (although many species of Sapindus are usually called Bồ hòn), this tree species grows up to 13 m tall and Gagnepain's original description was from the Phan Rang area. The name probably describes the two metallic brown-red hairy scales, sheathing the petals; leaflets are in 1-2 pairs. The seeds are relatively large (15 mm) grouped in 1-3 mericarps.
