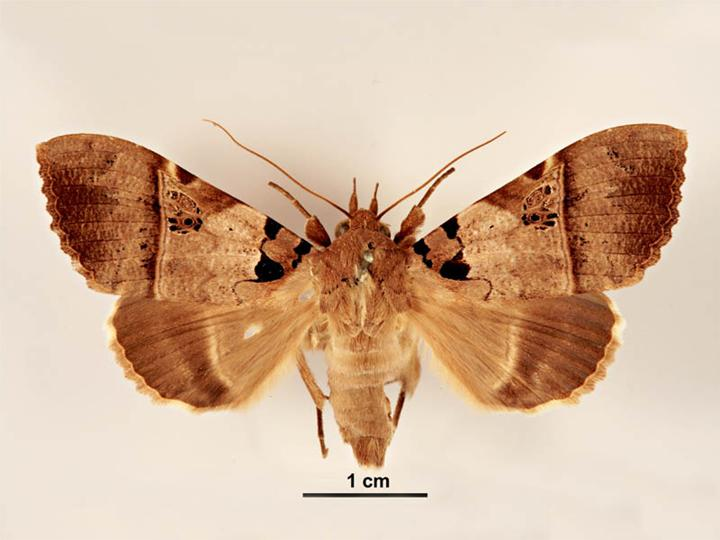
- Female, dorsal view
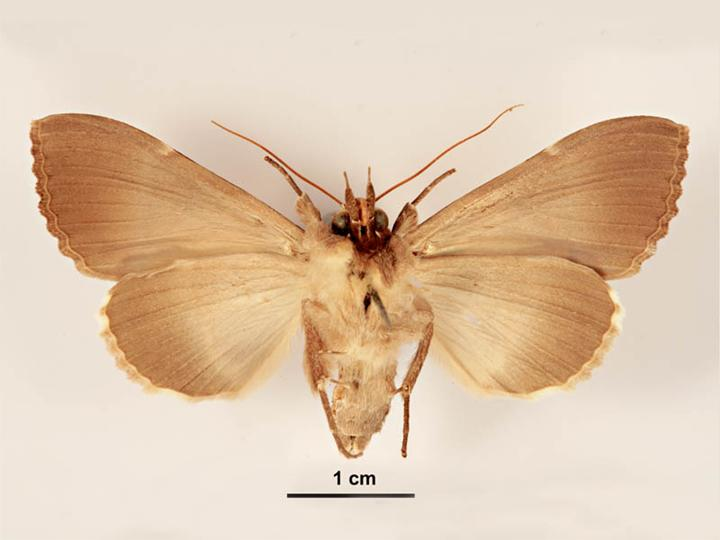
- Female, ventral view

Scientific classification
- Kingdom: Animalia
- Phylum: Arthropoda
- Clade: Pancrustacea
- Class: Insecta
- Order: Lepidoptera
- Superfamily: Noctuoidea
- Family: Erebidae
- Genus: Serrodes
- Species: S. mediopallens

Binomial name
- Serrodes mediopallens L. B. Prout, 1924

= Serrodes mediopallens =

Species of moth

Serrodes mediopallens is a moth of the family Erebidae first described by Louis Beethoven Prout in 1924. It is found on the Society Islands, New Caledonia, Fiji, French Polynesia and in Australia.

Adults pierce fruits to suck the juice and are considered a pest of Citrus in French Polynesia.
