= Serrodes malgassica =

Scientific classification
- Kingdom: Animalia
- Phylum: Arthropoda
- Class: Insecta
- Order: Lepidoptera
- Superfamily: Noctuoidea
- Family: Erebidae
- Genus: Serrodes
- Species: S. malgassica

Binomial name
- Serrodes malgassica Viette, 1972

Species of moth

Serrodes malgassica is a moth of the family Erebidae. It is found in Madagascar.
