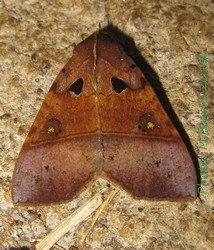

Scientific classification
- Domain: Eukaryota
- Kingdom: Animalia
- Phylum: Arthropoda
- Class: Insecta
- Order: Lepidoptera
- Superfamily: Noctuoidea
- Family: Erebidae
- Genus: Serrodes
- Species: S. trispila

Binomial name
- Serrodes trispila (Mabille, 1890)

Synonyms
- Athyrma trispila Mabille, 1890; Serrodes cordifera A. E. Prout, 1927

= Serrodes trispila =

Species of moth

Serrodes trispila is a moth of the family Erebidae first described by Paul Mabille in 1890.

== Distribution ==
It is found in subtropical Africa where it had been recorded from Cameroon the Republic of the Congo, Ethiopia, Ivory Coast, Sao Tomé, Sierra Leone, South Africa, Madagascar, Réunion and Mauritius.

The larvae had been recorded on Doratoxylon aptealum (Sapindaceae).
