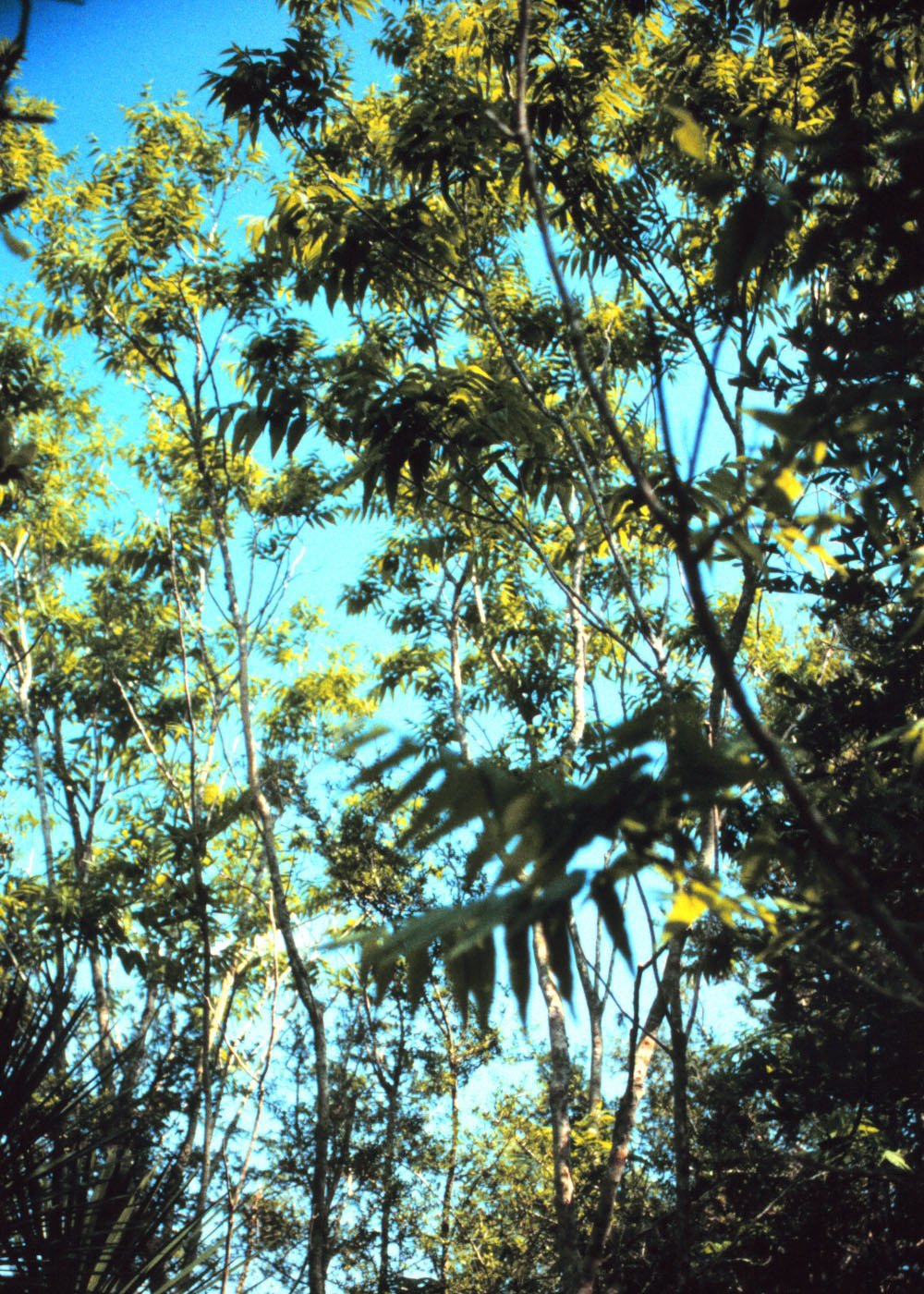
- Stand of Sapindus marginatus trees

Scientific classification
- Kingdom: Plantae
- Clade: Tracheophytes
- Clade: Angiosperms
- Clade: Eudicots
- Clade: Rosids
- Order: Sapindales
- Family: Sapindaceae
- Genus: Sapindus
- Species: S. marginatus

Binomial name
- Sapindus marginatus Willd.

Synonyms
- Sapindus acuminatus Raf.; Sapindus falcatus Raf.; Sapindus manatensis Shuttlew. ex Radlk.

= Sapindus marginatus =

Species of tree

Sapindus marginatus, the Florida soapberry, is a tree native to Georgia, Florida and South Carolina. It grows to about 9.1 m (30 ft) tall. It has pale gray or brown, ridged bark. The leaves are up to 30 cm (1 ft) foot long with 6 to 13 leaflets. The leaflets are 5 to 15 cm (2 to 6 in) long and 2 to 7 cm (.75 to 2.75 in) wide, and have pointed tips with no teeth on the edges. The leaflets may be opposite or alternate. The leaves fall in the early spring.

Florida soapberry is similar to tropical soapberry (Sapindus saponaria). Some botanists consider Florida soapberry to be the same species as tropical soapberry.
