= Sapindus rarak =

Scientific classification
- Kingdom: Plantae
- Clade: Tracheophytes
- Clade: Angiosperms
- Clade: Eudicots
- Clade: Rosids
- Order: Sapindales
- Family: Sapindaceae
- Genus: Sapindus
- Species: S. rarak

Binomial name
- Sapindus rarak Candolle

Species of tree

Sapindus rarak is a species of soapberry. It is a deciduous tree up to 42 metres (138 ft) tall native to south and east Asia (from India and Sri Lanka in the west to south China and Taiwan in the north and to Indonesia in the south). Its species name is derived from the Malaysian name rerak or rerek. In Indonesia it is commonly known as lerak or klerek.

== Description ==
Sapindus rarak trees can reach height of 42 metres (138 ft) and a diameter of 1 metre (3 ft 3 in). Its compound leaves are large, up to 50 centimetres (20 in) long.

== Use ==
Sapindus rarak is a timber tree but the wood is not durable. Its fruits and seeds are used as buttons and beads. In Indonesia, the fruit are used to make a traditional soap for washing clothes, especially batik. Unlike many commercial detergents, it does not cause the colours to fade.
