= Serrodes flavitincta =

Scientific classification
- Kingdom: Animalia
- Phylum: Arthropoda
- Class: Insecta
- Order: Lepidoptera
- Superfamily: Noctuoidea
- Family: Erebidae
- Genus: Serrodes
- Species: S. flavitincta

Binomial name
- Serrodes flavitincta Hampson, 1926

Species of moth

Serrodes flavitincta is a moth of the family Erebidae. It is found in South Africa.
