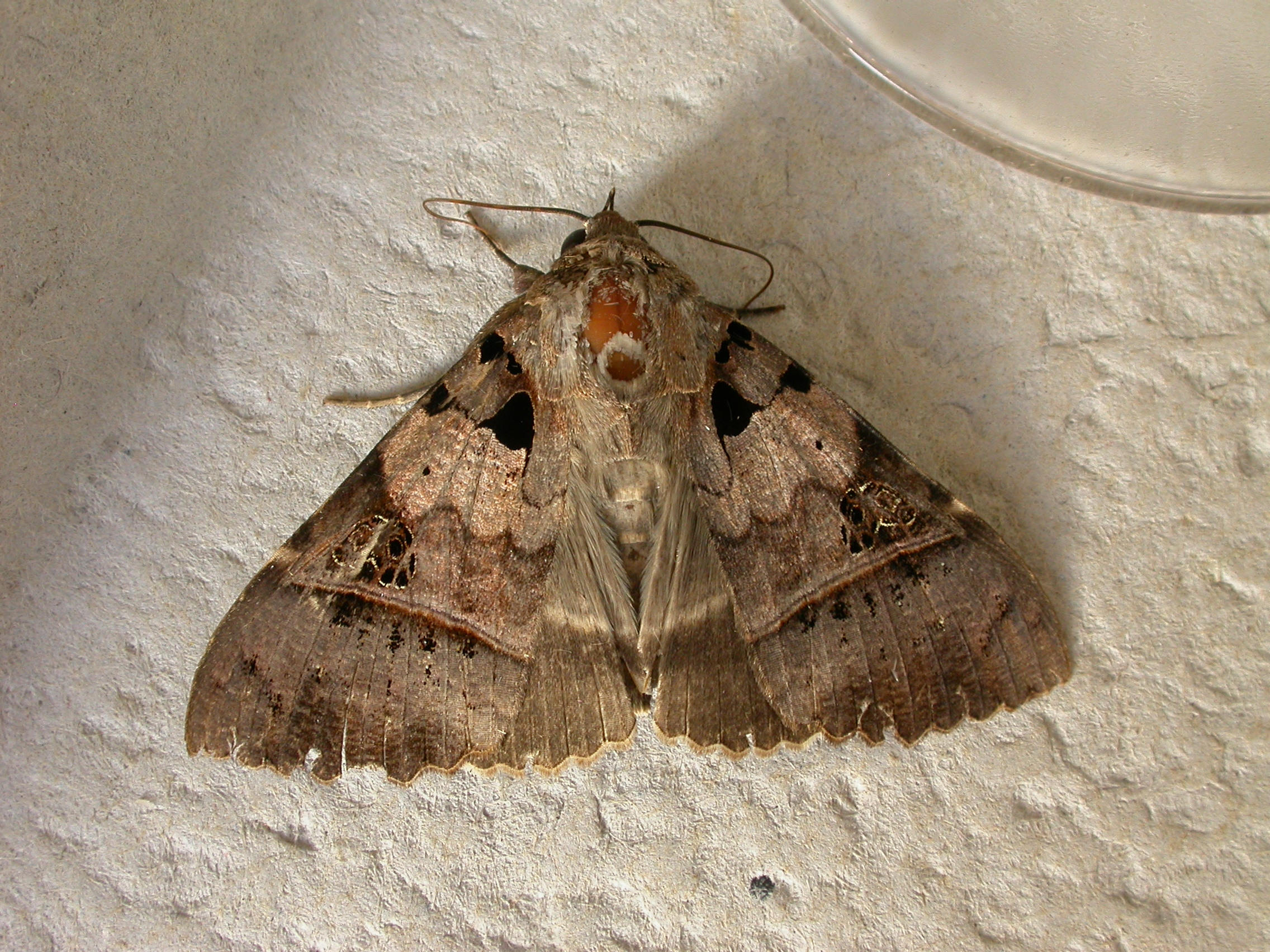

Scientific classification
- Kingdom: Animalia
- Phylum: Arthropoda
- Class: Insecta
- Order: Lepidoptera
- Superfamily: Noctuoidea
- Family: Erebidae
- Tribe: Cocytiini
- Genus: Serrodes; Guenée in Boisduval & Guenée, 1852

= Serrodes =

Genus of moths

Serrodes is a genus of moths in the family Erebidae first described by Achille Guenée in 1852.

== Description ==
Costa of the forewings slightly arched before apex. Cilia of forewings and hindwings strongly crenulate. Tibia extremely hairy in both sexes. Mid tibia of male with dense long hair lying along their inner sides. Larva with four abdominal prolegs, with rudimentary first pair.

== Species ==
- Serrodes caesia Warren, 1915
- Serrodes campana Guenée, 1852
- Serrodes flavitincta Hampson, 1926
- Serrodes malgassica Viette, 1972
- Serrodes mediopallens Prout, 1924
- Serrodes partita (Fabricius, 1775)
- Serrodes trispila (Mabille, 1890)
- Serrodes villosipeda Strand, 1910

== Former species ==
- Serrodes curvilinea Prout, 1921
- Serrodes inara Cramer, [1779]
- Serrodes nigha Guenée, 1852
- Serrodes subumbra (Bethune-Baker, 1906)
- Serrodes xanthorrhoea Felder & Rogenhofer, 1874
