= Lepisanthes senegalensis =

Scientific classification
- Kingdom: Plantae
- Clade: Tracheophytes
- Clade: Angiosperms
- Clade: Eudicots
- Clade: Rosids
- Order: Sapindales
- Family: Sapindaceae
- Genus: Lepisanthes
- Species: L. senegalensis

Binomial name
- Lepisanthes senegalensis (Poir.) Leenh., Blumea 17 (1969)

Species of tree

Lepisanthes senegalensis is a tree widespread through tropical Africa and tropical Asia to New Guinea and northern Australia.

== Ecology ==
Wet valleys. Guangxi, Southern Yunnan, Bangladesh, Bhutan, India, Indochinese peninsula, Indonesia, Malaysia, Myanmar, Nepal, New Guinea, Philippines, Sri Lanka; Africa, Madagascar.
