= Lepisanthes fruticosa =

Conservation status
- Least Concern (IUCN 3.1)

Scientific classification
- Kingdom: Plantae
- Clade: Embryophytes
- Clade: Tracheophytes
- Clade: Spermatophytes
- Clade: Angiosperms
- Clade: Eudicots
- Clade: Rosids
- Order: Sapindales
- Family: Sapindaceae
- Genus: Lepisanthes
- Species: L. fruticosa

Binomial name
- Lepisanthes fruticosa (Roxb.) Leenh.

Synonyms
- List: Allophylus pinnatus Roxb. ex Wight & Arn.; Capura fruticosa (Blume) Blanco; Capura fruticosa (Blume) Blanco ex S.Vidal; Capura nigrescens S.Vidal; Capura pinnata Blanco; Capura pulchella Ridl.; Capura zollingerianus Teijsm. & Binn.; Koelreuteria edulis Blanco; Otolepis cambodiana Pierre; Otolepis erythrocalyx (Hiern) Kuntze; Otolepis fruticosa (Roxb.) Kuntze; Otolepis furcata Pierre; Otolepis nigrescens Turcz.; Otolepis nodosa Pierre; Otolepis sessilis King; Otophora acuminata Radlk.; Otophora anomala Radlk.; Otophora bijuga Radlk.; Otophora blancoi Blume; Otophora cambodiana (Pierre) Lecomte; Otophora cambodiana Pierre; Otophora cauliflora Merr.; Otophora eberhardtii Gagnep.; Otophora erythrocalyx Hiern; Otophora fruticosa (Roxb.) Blume; Otophora furcata (Pierre) Lecomte; Otophora furcata Pierre; Otophora glandulosa Radlk.; Otophora grandifoliola Quisumb. & Merr.; Otophora lancifolia Radlk.; Otophora latifolia Ridl.; Otophora nigrescens Fern.-Vill.; Otophora nodosa (Pierre) Lecomte; Otophora nodosa Pierre; Otophora oliviformis Radlk.; Otophora pinnata (Blanco) Merr.; Otophora pulchella (Ridl.) Merr.; Otophora resecta Radlk.; Otophora sessilis King; Otophora sessllis King; Otophora setigera Radlk.; Otophora siamensis Craib; Otophora zollingeriana Teijsm. & Binn.; Sapindus baccatus Blanco; Sapindus fruticosus Roxb.

Species of flowering plant

Lepisanthes fruticosa, also known as chammaliang, is a species of flowering plant in the lychee family, Sapindaceae.

== Description ==
The species grows between 1.5 and 10 m tall, rarely up to 15 m, and has a bole diameter of 2 to 15 cm. Its fruits are red/black and about 4 cm in diameter.

== Distribution and habitat ==
Lepisanthes fruticosa is found in Southeast Asia, where it can be seen as primary vegetation in open forests, besides rivers, and at elevations from sea level to 1,400 meters (4,600 ft).

== Cultivation and uses ==
The species is frequently cultivated locally, as it can grow in a wide range of soil conditions. The fruits are sweet when ripe and can be eaten fresh, while the seed can be roasted. The roots can be used as a poultice that relieves itching and lowers temperature in fevers.
