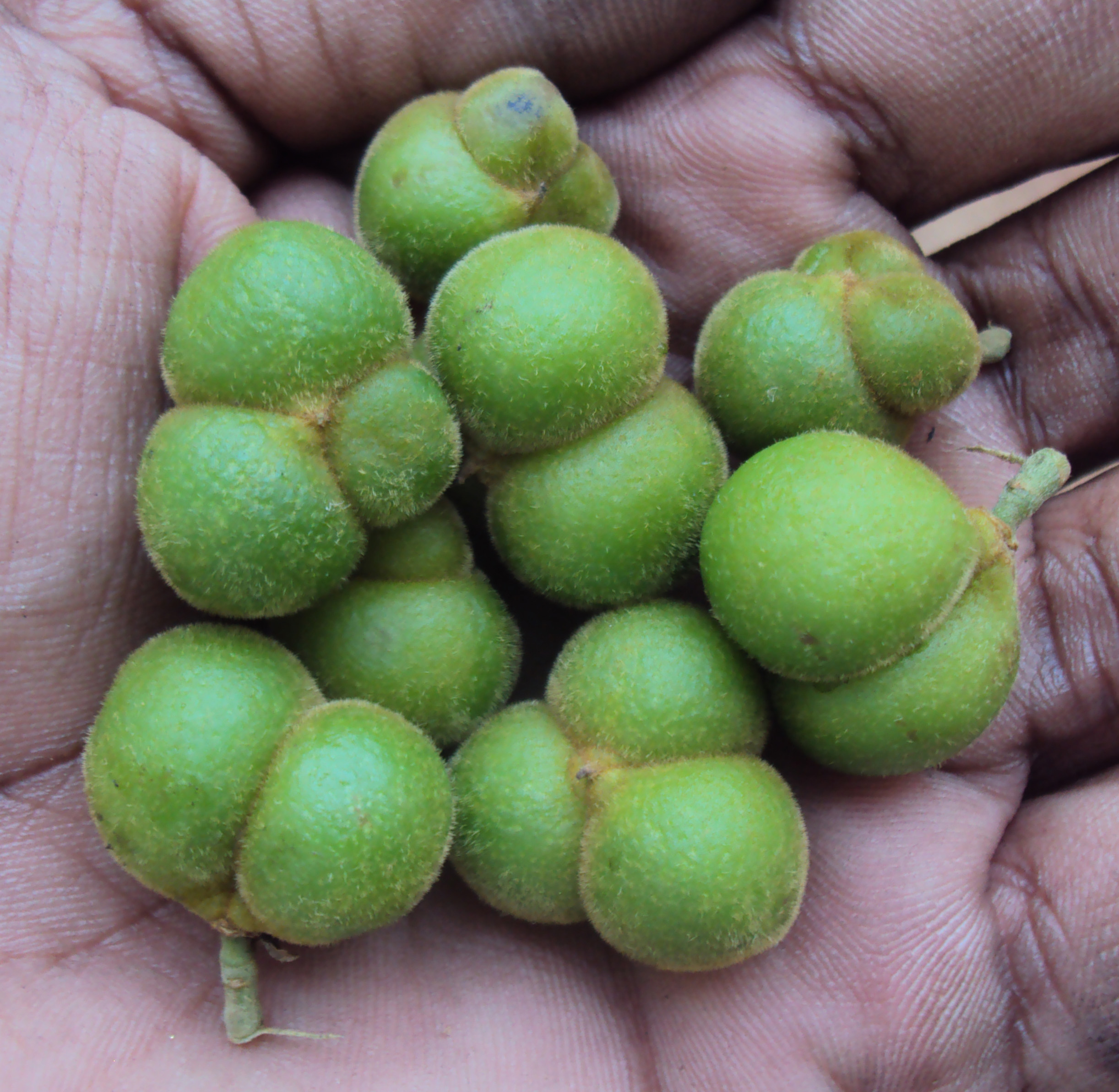
- Berries in hand
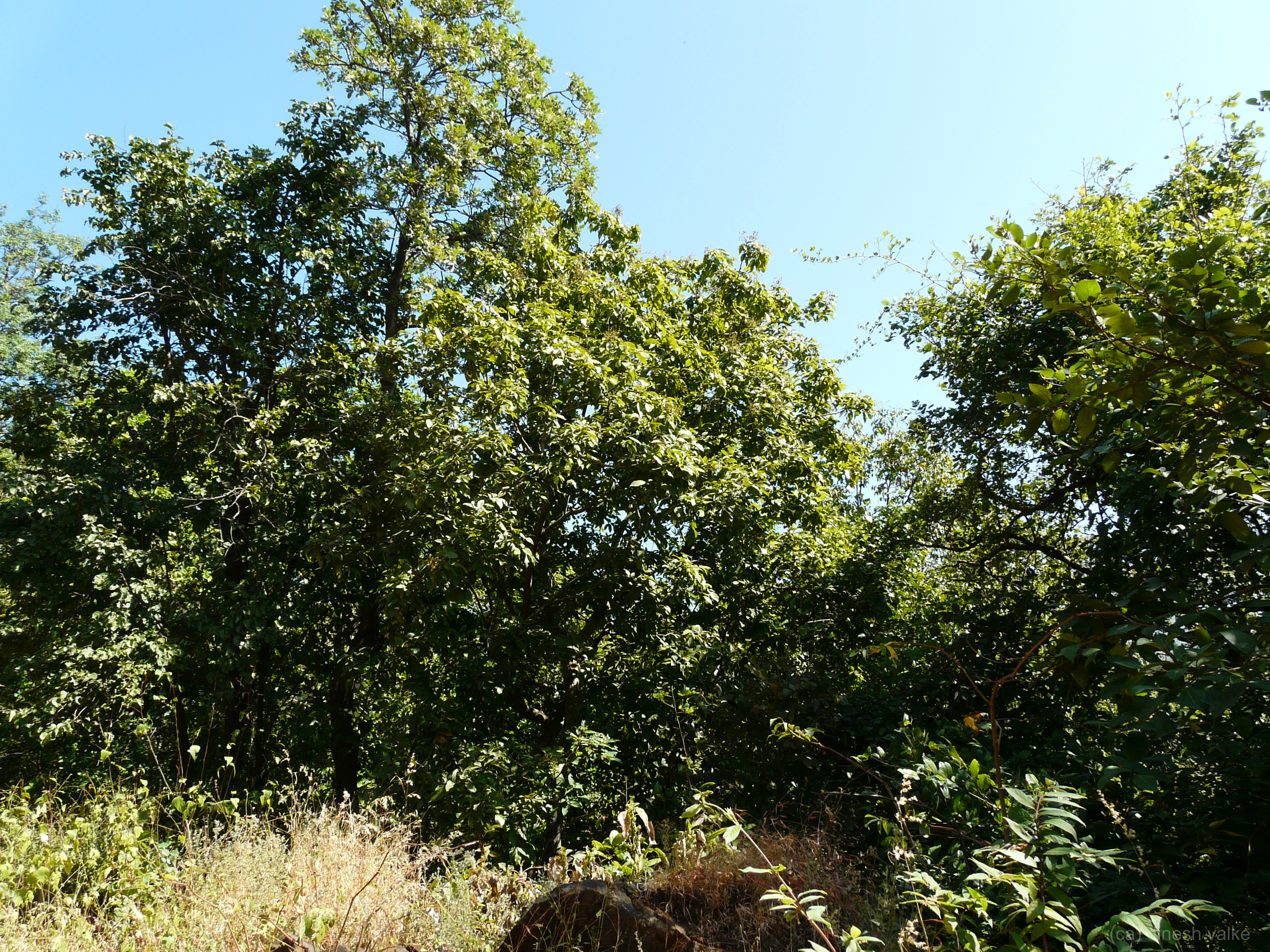
- Younger specimens

Scientific classification
- Kingdom: Plantae
- Clade: Embryophytes
- Clade: Tracheophytes
- Clade: Spermatophytes
- Clade: Angiosperms
- Clade: Eudicots
- Clade: Rosids
- Order: Sapindales
- Family: Sapindaceae
- Genus: Sapindus
- Species: S. trifoliatus

Binomial name
- Sapindus trifoliatus L.

Synonyms
- Sapindus abstergens Roxb. ex Wight & Arn.; Sapindus acutus Roxb. ex Wight & Arn.; Sapindus laurifolius Vahl; Sapindus maduriensis Perr.; Sapindus mollis Blume

= Sapindus trifoliatus =

Species of plant in the soapberry family

Sapindus trifoliatus, the South India soapnut or three-leaf soapberry, is a species of flowering plant in the family Sapindaceae, native to Pakistan, India, Bangladesh, the Andaman Islands, Myanmar, and Sri Lanka, and introduced to eastern tropical Africa, Rodrigues, and Trinidad and Tobago. An evergreen tree reaching 25 m (82 ft), its seeds are rich in saponins, and are both collected in the wild and cultivated to make soap for washing fabrics.
