= Berthe Hoola van Nooten =

Dutch botanist, author and scientific illustrator

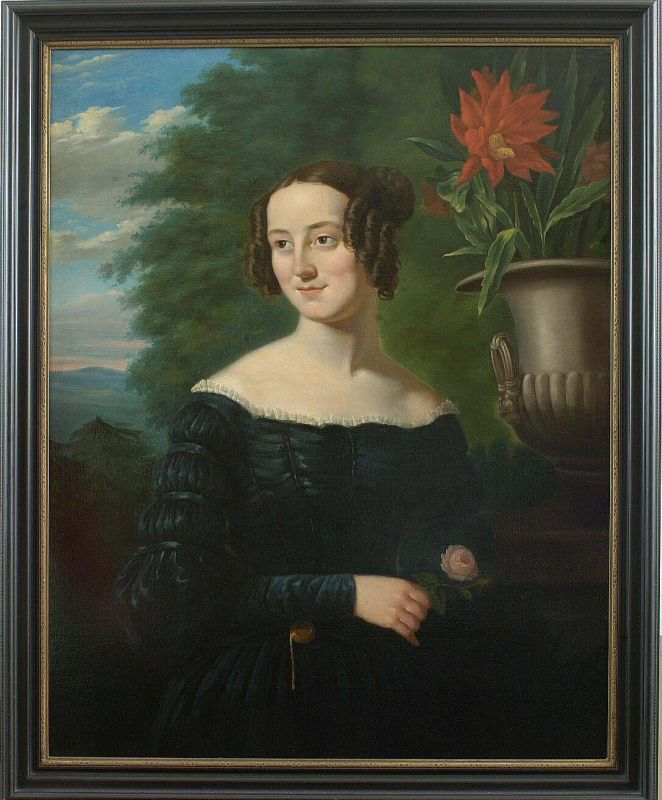
- Born: 12 October 1817; The Netherlands
- Died: 12 April 1892 (aged 74); Tanah Abang
- Known for: Fleurs, Fruits et Feuillages, choisis de l'île de Java

Berthe Hoola van Nooten (née Bartha Hendrica Philippina van Dolder; 12 October 1817 in Utrecht – 12 April 1892 in Tanah Abang) was a Dutch botanical artist, noted for her botanical plates illustrating "Fleurs, Fruits et Feuillages Choisis de l'Ile de Java" in 1863–64. Hoola van Nooten is denoted by the author abbreviation Hoola van Nooten when citing a botanical name.

== Life ==
Berthe was the daughter of Johannes Wilhelmus van Dolder, a vicar, and his wife Philippina Maria Batenburg. On 11 July 1838 in Wageningen, she married Dirk Hoola van Nooten, a judge in Paramaribo. Interested in botany, she regularly sent specimens of cultivated plants to botanical gardens in the Netherlands, collected on trips through Suriname with her husband. She and her husband later moved to New Orleans where they established a Protestant school for girls connected to the Protestant Episcopal Church. Personal tragedy struck with her husband's death from yellow fever in 1847, leaving her with a young family of five. She was judged competent by the church and allowed to continue the school. After a stay in Europe the New Orleans school was re-established in Plaquemine, Louisiana, in 1850. She then moved to Galveston. In January 1854, The Galveston News reported that Mrs. van Nooten's Young Ladies Institute, for which she purchased a 'large and handsome residence', was operational. In October and November 1855, however, the same paper published repeated court orders for B. H. van Nooten, who had argued she was not a resident of Texas, to appear for the Justice of the Peace to answer to creditors. She then travelled to the island of Java with her brother, a highly successful merchant in the business of sugar, machines and life insurance. Having arrived in Java she applied for a Government subsidy for setting up a Protestant girls school to countenance the influence of Roman Catholic seminaries.

Hoola van Nooten was also interested in the indigenous flora of Java and gave drawing lessons, where she befriended the Javanese botanical illustrator, Radhen Salikin, who was familiar with the local flora. She produced 40 plates depicting interesting plant species from Java, following the precedents set by Maria Sibylla Merian and Elizabeth Blackwell. The drawings would make up the illustrated work Fleurs, Fruits et Feuillages, choisis de l'île Java: peints d'après nature. The illustrations are accompanied by descriptions in French and English, describing the plant's history and uses. The work was published in Brussels in 1863, and was dedicated to Sophia Mathilde, wife of King William III of the Netherlands, whose patronage she had acquired.

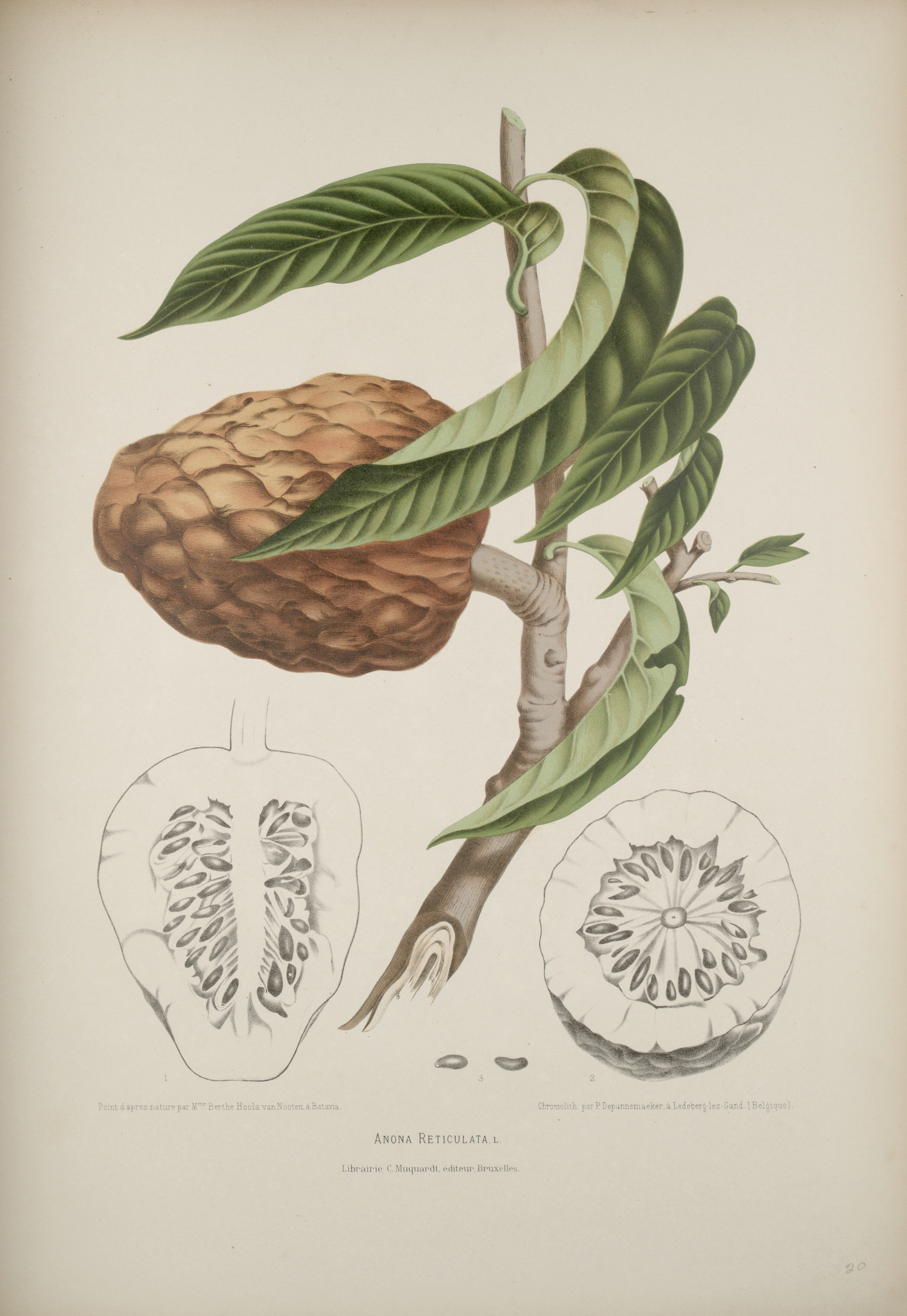
Annona reticulata - Custard-apple

The well executed chromolithographs were done by Pieter De Pannemaeker, the Belgian lithographer operating from Ledeberg in Ghent.

Van Nooten was clearly a more than competent artist, for the splendid tropical plants, with their lush foliage, vividly coloured flowers and exotic fruit, have been depicted with great skill. She managed to accentuate the splendour of each species by adopting a style that combined great precision and clarity with a touch of neo-Baroque exuberance, reveling in the rich forms and colours of the tropics. The reader's eye is immediately captured by the dark leaves, shown furled or crumpled or partly nibbled away by insects, the delicately rendered details of the follicles and seeds, and the heavy clusters of flowers that cascade down the page. The excellent reproduction of the artist's drawings in the form of chromolithographs lends a tactile quality to these striking images.

— Lucia Tongiorgi Tomasi, An Oak Spring Flora.

In 1872, Hoola van Nooten met Alexei Alexandrovitch, son of tsar Alexander II of Russia, who was visiting Batavia on diplomatic business. Hoola van Noten gifted him a copy of Fleurs, Fruits, et Feuillages and she received a bracelet in return.

Although the book was published in a number of editions, Hoola van Nooten died in poverty in Tanah Abang at the age of 74. The Hoola van Nooten family name is today respected in the Netherlands, and is listed in the Nederlands Patriciaat, a register of Dutch families who have played a significant role in Dutch society over the past 150 years.
