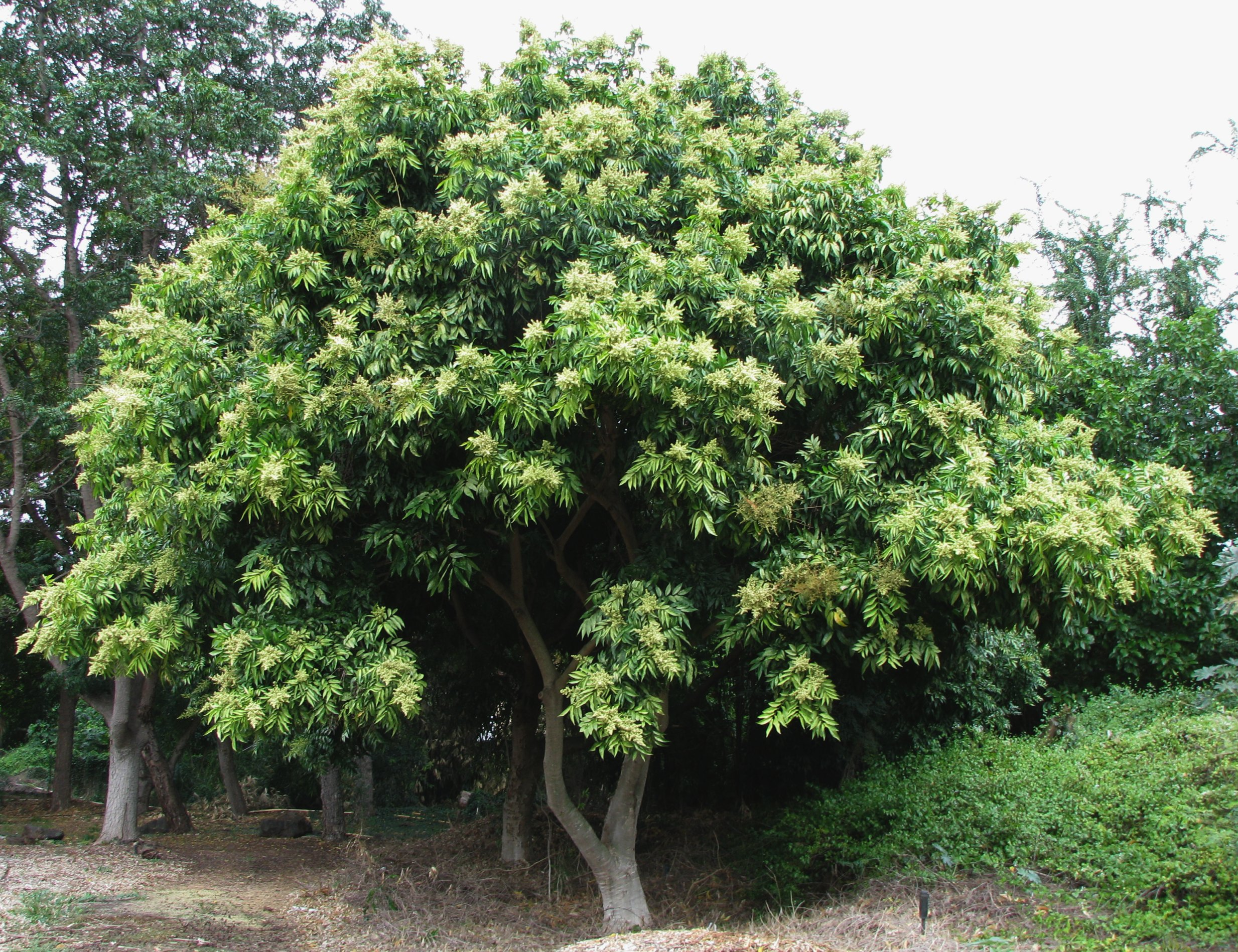
- Sapindus saponaria tree

Conservation status
- Least Concern (IUCN 3.1)

Scientific classification
- Kingdom: Plantae
- Clade: Embryophytes
- Clade: Tracheophytes
- Clade: Angiosperms
- Clade: Eudicots
- Clade: Rosids
- Order: Sapindales
- Family: Sapindaceae
- Genus: Sapindus
- Species: S. saponaria

Binomial name
- Sapindus saponaria L.

Varieties
- S. s. var. drummondii S. s. var. saponaria

= Sapindus saponaria =

Species of tree

Sapindus saponaria is a small to medium-sized deciduous tree native to the Americas. Common names include rocky mountain maple, wingleaf soapberry, western soapberry, jaboncillo, sulluku and manele and a'e (Hawaiian). Its genus name, Sapindus, comes from the Latin, meaning Indian soap, and its specific epithet means "soapy".

Western Soapberry is a member of the maple family of trees.

Although western soapberry lumber is not harvested commercially due to its rarity, it was highly esteemed in the recent past by indigenous ethnic groups like the Plains Apache, for its hardness and resilience.

Western soapberry is classified as a "least concern" species, and due to its hardiness, it thrives in regions with poor soil and extreme drought. However, agricultural development threatens the existence of certain local communities in south-central Oklahoma.

The fruit of western soapberry is mildy toxic if ingested orally, due to the high saponin content. The high saponin content also allows for the fruit to be used as a form of lathering soap. Despite the mild oral toxicity, the fruits of soapberry species may have topical health benefits.

== Taxonomy ==
Plants of the World Online

- Sapindus
  - 'S. saponaria var. saponaria (syn. S. marginatus) Willd.
  - - S. saponaria var. inaequalis Radlk.
    - - S. saponaria var. jardiniana F.Br.
      - 'S. saponaria var. thurstonii (Rock) Skottsb.

Note: "Sapindus saponaria is a synonym of the restored species Sapindus drummondii. It is called "Western soapberry" and is native from Arizona to Louisiana in the south ranging north to Kansas and far southwestern Missouri in the north. It is also native to the states of Sonora, Chihuahua, and Coahuila in Mexico.

== Distribution ==
This species has a very wide native range throughout the Americas, ranging from Kansas (with isolated populations known as far north as Montana, Colorado, and Missouri) east to Florida and the West Indies, and south to Paraguay. Populations are also known from isolated oceanic islands, including Clarion Island, the Galápagos Islands, and the Hawaiian Islands.

== Description ==
It often grows in clumps or thickets reaching about 20 ft. (6.1 m) in height in the western part of its range. Solitary trees though can grow as tall as 50 ft. (15.2 m) in height. In the western part of its range it is most often found growing at the head of prairie ravines, the margins of woodlands, the edges of fields or on rocky hillsides.

The leaves of the soapberry are alternate, pinnately compound, thick and leathery but deciduous, 8 in. (20 cm) to 15 in. (38 cm) in length, made up of 6 to 20 narrow lanceolate leaflets with smooth margins, long tapered tips, and uneven wedge-shaped bases which are 2 in. to 5 in. (5 cm to 13 cm) long and .75 in. to 1.5 in. (2 cm to cm) wide. Midveins on leaves of var. saponaria are mostly winged, while those of var. drummondii are never winged.

The inflorescence are dense terminal panicles of small white flowers 6 in. to 10 in (15 cm to 20 cm) long. Flowering occurs in May–June for var. drummondii and in November for var. saponaria.

The fruit occur in large pyramidal clusters at the ends of branches. Each golden colored fruit is between 1.2 in. to 1.4 in. (3 cm to 3.6 cm) in diameter and becomes translucent and wrinkled when fully mature and contains a single black seed about .35 in (9 mm) in diameter. Fruits of var. drummondii ripen in October and often remain on the tree until spring, while those of var. saponaria ripen in spring.

The twigs of var. drummondii are gray-brown and hairy with short tan colored hairs while those of var. saponaria are gray and hairless. Buds on var. drummondii are small dark brown and hairy while those on var. saponaria are small brown and hairless.

The trunk of var. drummondii has light gray, scaly with thin plate like bark and sometimes shallowly furrowed while var. saponaria has gray to reddish colored scaly bark.

Western soapberry has an emarkable yellow-colored sapwood which contrasts sharply with the heartwood. In the Plains Apache language, the wood was called chishłítsowe, meaning 'yellow wood'.

== Uses ==
Western soapberry wood is very hard, heavy, elastic and close-grained -- properties that give the tree excellent resistance to the extreme winds of the southern Great Plains. For these reasons, the wood was highly esteemed by the indigenous Plains Apache people of Oklahoma, who used it make tent poles, bows and arrows, and tool handles. It was said that tent poles made from the branches of this wood would "last indefinitely", if seasoned.

The fruits can contain as much as 37% of saponin, and when macerated in water they produce a soapy lather. Formerly, they were much used in Mexico and in other regions for laundering clothes.

The dark round seeds are made into buttons and necklaces. The wood splits easily and is made into baskets.

== Toxicity ==
The fruit of Sapindus saponaria var. drummondii are poisonous and can cause skin rashes; they have been used to stupefy fish. The foliage may also be toxic to livestock.

== Notable specimens ==
One of the tallest drummondii specimens is located in southern Johnson County, Kansas, and measures 59 ft. (18 m) tall, with a 39 ft. (11.9 m) wide crown spread. Its trunk circumference was 10 1/2 ft. (3.2 m) in. at 4 1/2 ft. (1.4 m).

One of the largest saponaria variants is located in Hawaii County, Hawaii, and measures 71 ft. (21.6 m) tall, with a 68 ft. (20.7 m) wide crown spread. Its trunk circumference was 160.5 inches (408 cm) at 4 1/2 ft. (1.4 m).

== Gallery ==
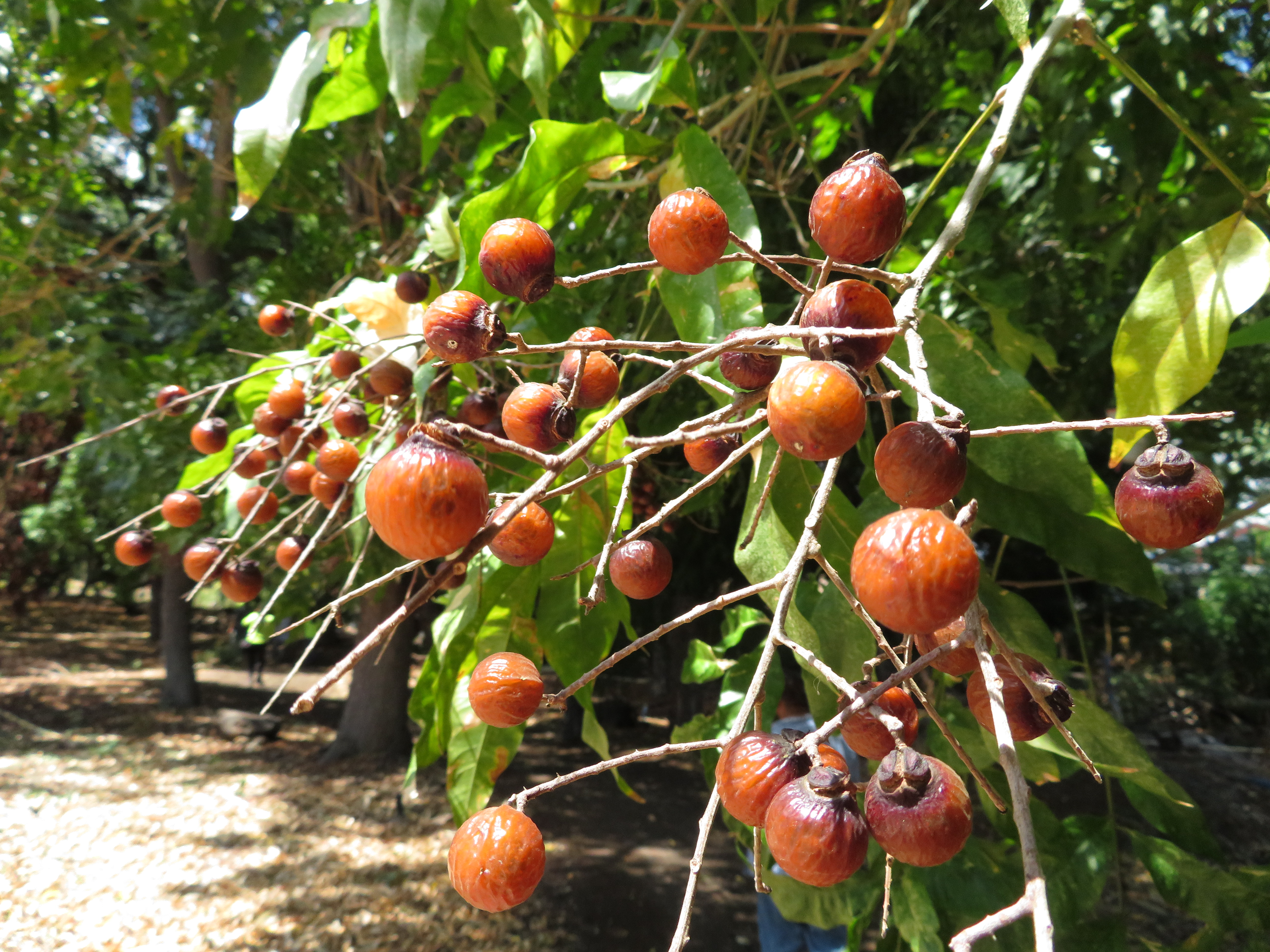
Example from Oahu, Hawaii.

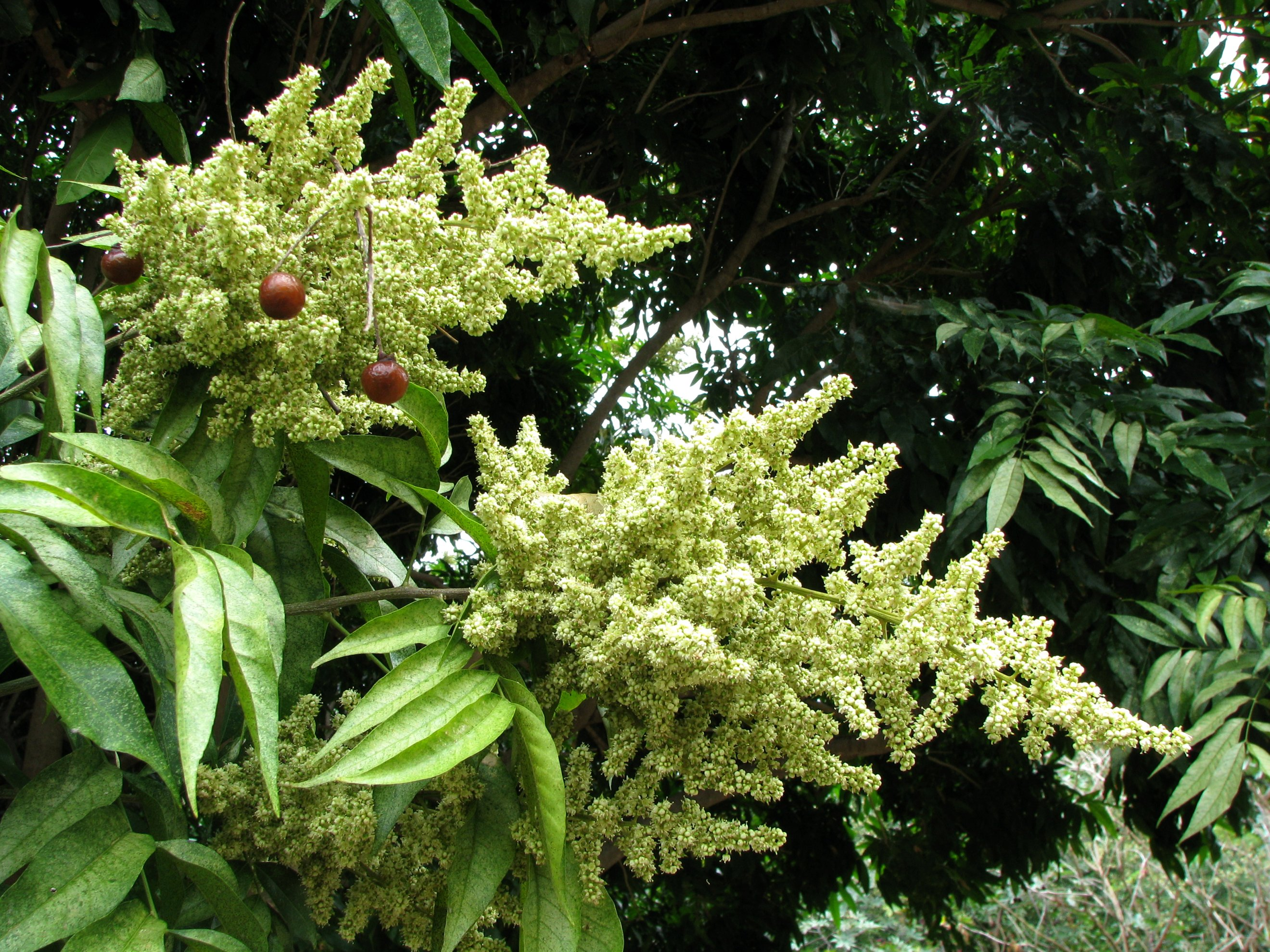
Sapindus Saponaria var. saponaria
