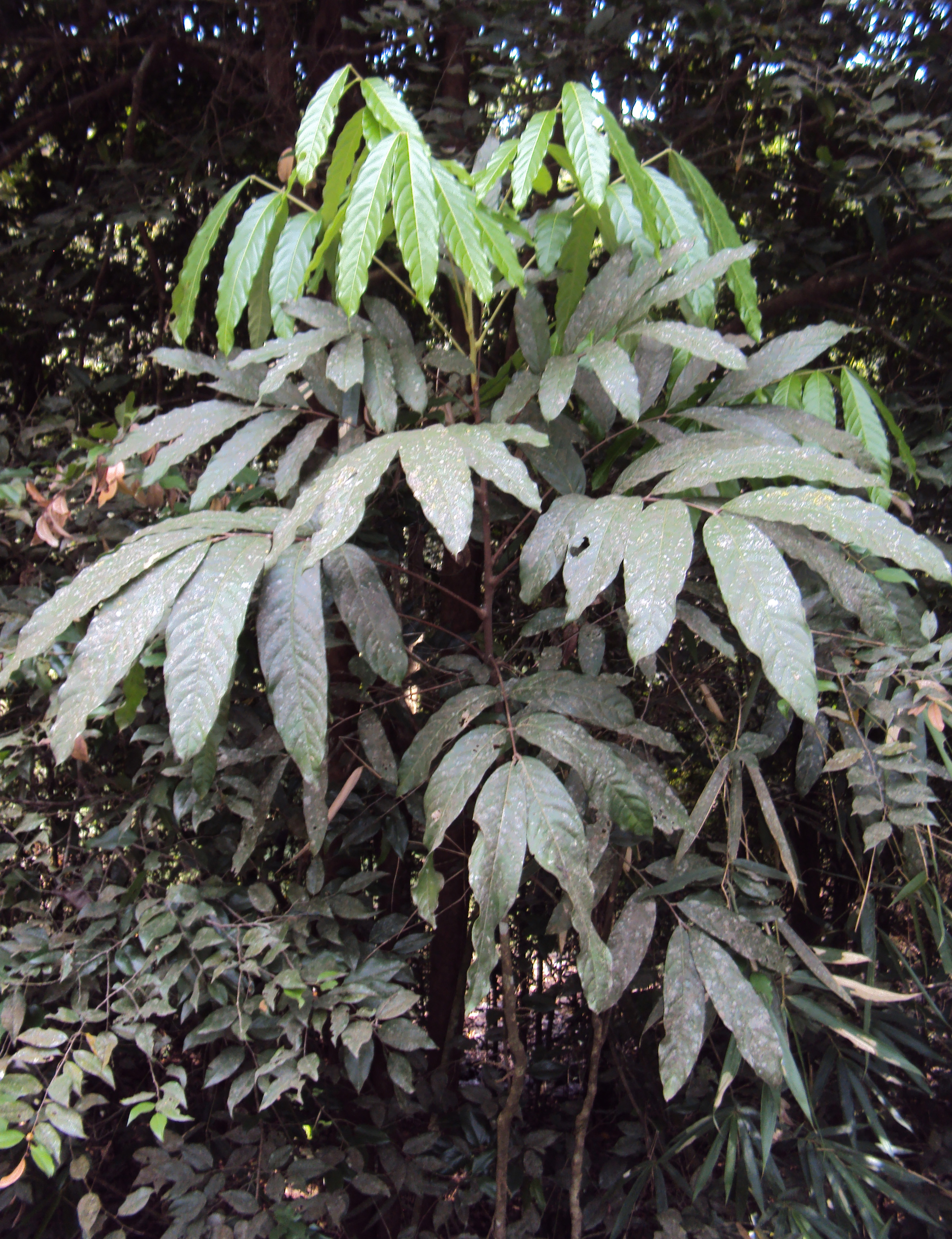
- Lepisanthes tetraphylla

Scientific classification
- Kingdom: Plantae
- Clade: Embryophytes
- Clade: Tracheophytes
- Clade: Spermatophytes
- Clade: Angiosperms
- Clade: Eudicots
- Clade: Rosids
- Order: Sapindales
- Family: Sapindaceae
- Subfamily: Sapindoideae
- Genus: Lepisanthes; Blume

Species
- About 30

Synonyms
- 17 synonyms: Anomosanthes Blume; Aphania Blume; Aphanococcus Radlk.; Capura Blanco; Erioglossum Blume; Hebecoccus Radlk.; Hemigyrosa Blume; Howethoa Rauschert; Manongarivea Choux; Moulinsia Cambess.; Otolepis Turcz.; Otophora Blume; Sapindopsis F.C.How & C.N.Ho; Scorododendron Blume; Thraulococcus Radlk.; Uitenia Noronha; Vitenia Noronha ex Cambess.

= Lepisanthes =

Genus of flowering plants

Lepisanthes is a genus of 31 species of plants in the lychee family Sapindaceae, native to tropical Africa, south and southeast Asia, Australia, and Madagascar. It includes species formerly classified in the genera Aphania, Erioglossum, and Otophora.

As of May 2026, Plants of the World Online accepted these species:

- Lepisanthes alata (Blume) Leenh.
- Lepisanthes amoena (Hassk.) Leenh.
- Lepisanthes amplifolia (Pierre) Leenh.
- Lepisanthes andamanica King
- Lepisanthes banaensis Gagnep.
- Lepisanthes basicardia Radlk.
- Lepisanthes bengalan Leenh.
- Lepisanthes browniana Hiern
- Lepisanthes burmanica Kurz
- Lepisanthes cauliflora C.F.Liang & S.L.Mo
- Lepisanthes chrysotricha (Capuron) Buerki, Callm. & Lowry
- Lepisanthes dictyophylla (Radlk.) Leenh.
- Lepisanthes divaricata (Radlk.) Leenh.
- Lepisanthes erecta (Thwaites) Leenh.
- Lepisanthes falcata (Radlk.) Leenh.
- Lepisanthes ferruginea (Radlk.) Leenh.
- Lepisanthes fruticosa (Roxb.) Leenh.
- Lepisanthes hainanensis H.S.Lo
- Lepisanthes kinabaluensis Leenh.
- Lepisanthes membranifolia (Radlk.) Radlk.
- Lepisanthes mixta Leenh.
- Lepisanthes multijuga (Hook.f.) Leenh.
- Lepisanthes oligophylla (Merr. & Chun) N.H.Xia & Gadek
- Lepisanthes perrieri (Choux) Buerki, Callm. & Lowry
- Lepisanthes ramiflora (Radlk.) Leenh.
- Lepisanthes rubiginosa (Roxb.) Leenh.
- Lepisanthes sambiranensis Buerki, Callm. & Lowry
- Lepisanthes senegalensis (Poir.) Leenh.
- Lepisanthes simplicifolia (Thwaites) Leenh.
- Lepisanthes tetraphylla (Vahl) Radlk.
- Lepisanthes unilocularis Leenh.
