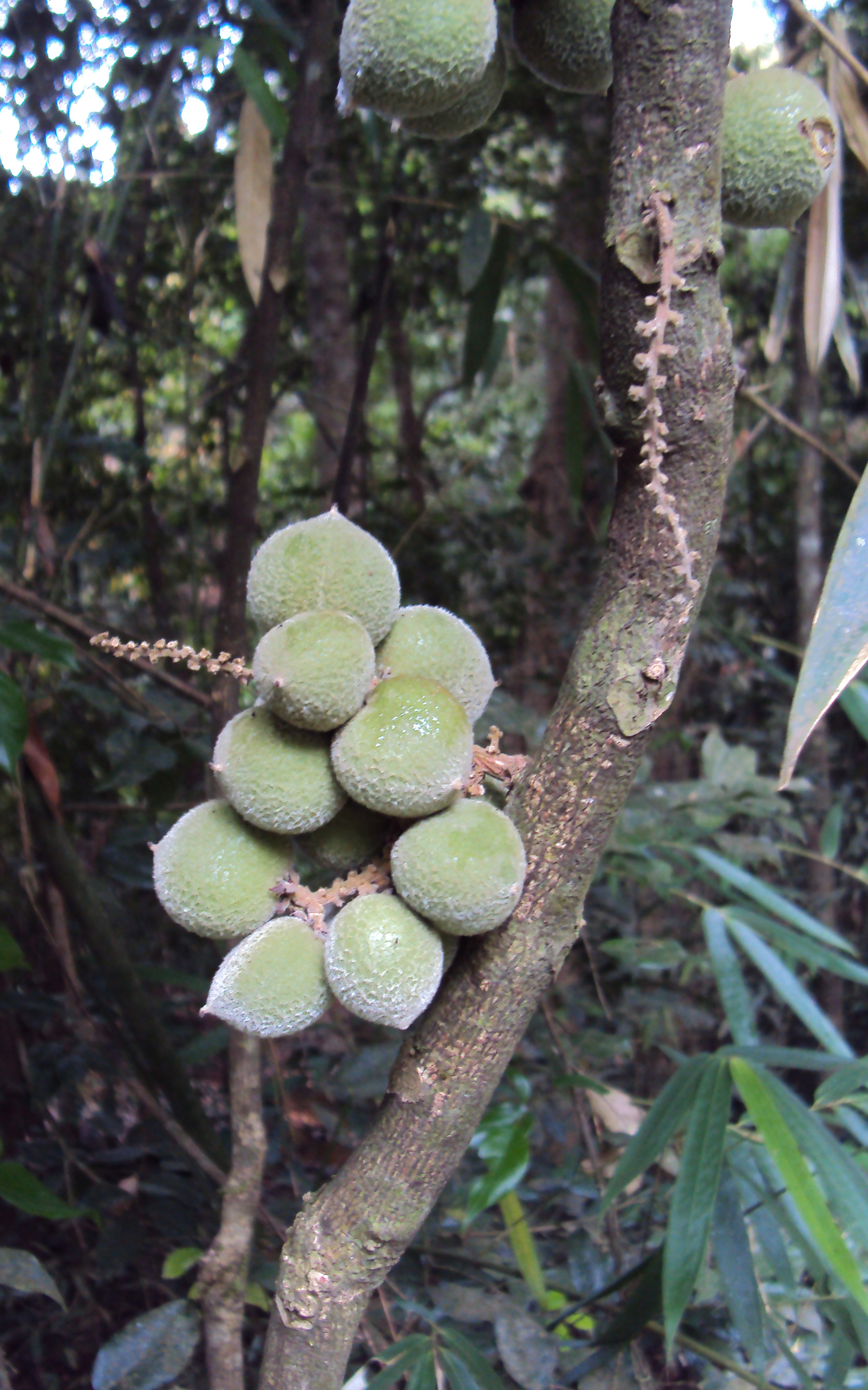
- Fruits

Scientific classification
- Kingdom: Plantae
- Clade: Tracheophytes
- Clade: Angiosperms
- Clade: Eudicots
- Clade: Rosids
- Order: Sapindales
- Family: Sapindaceae
- Genus: Lepisanthes
- Species: L. tetraphylla

Binomial name
- Lepisanthes tetraphylla (Vahl) Radlk.

= Lepisanthes tetraphylla =

Species of tree

Lepisanthes tetraphylla is a tree of India and Sri Lanka and other South Asian countries.
