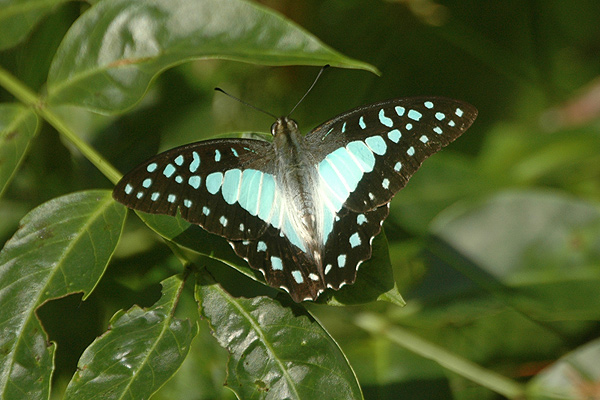
- At Mount Mee, Queensland, Australia
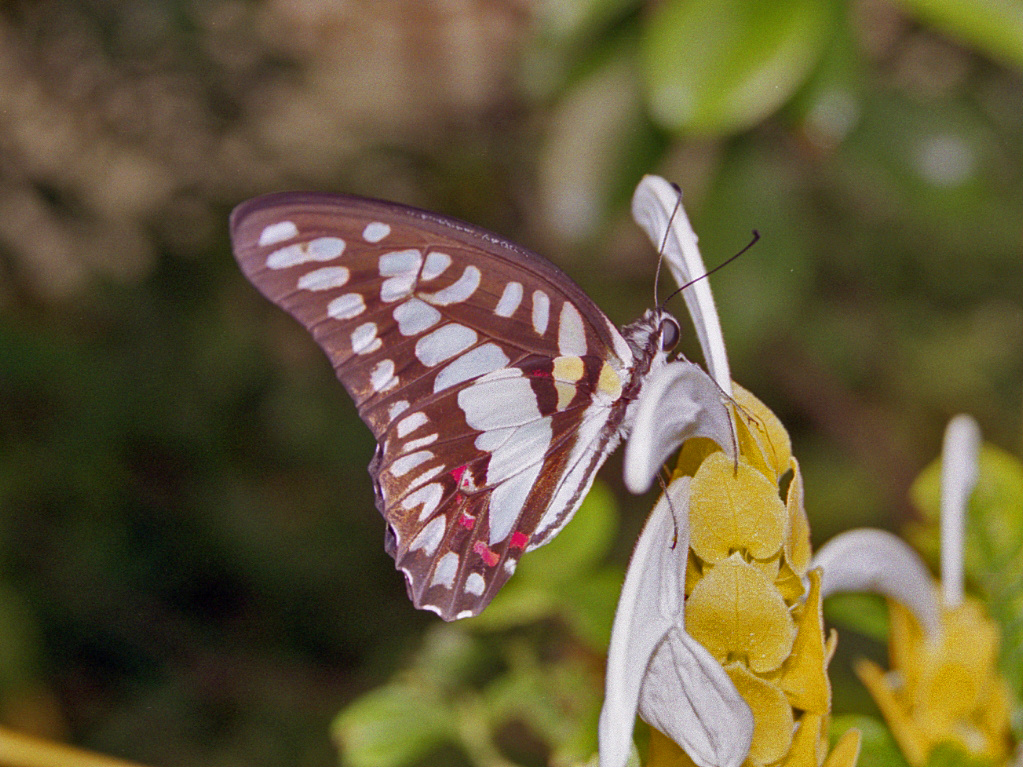
- G. e. mecisteus

Scientific classification
- Kingdom: Animalia
- Phylum: Arthropoda
- Clade: Pancrustacea
- Class: Insecta
- Order: Lepidoptera
- Family: Papilionidae
- Genus: Graphium
- Species: G. eurypylus

Binomial name
- Graphium eurypylus (Linnaeus, 1758)

Synonyms
- Papilio eurypylus Linnaeus, 1758; Chlorisses harrietta Swainson, 1851; Semicaudati kochianus Koch, 1860; Zetides euryplus; Arisbe eurypelus Page & Treadaway, 2003; Eurypleana eurypylus

= Graphium eurypylus =

Species of butterfly

Graphium eurypylus, the great jay or pale green triangle, is a species of tropical butterfly belonging to the family Papilionidae.

== Etymology ==
The specific name eurypylus likely comes from the name Eurypylus, a Thessalian king who lead the Thessalians during the Trojan War.

== Distribution ==
This species can be found in the Australasian realm and in the Indomalayan realm (Northeast India, Southeast Asia and Australia).

== Description ==
Graphium eurypylus has a wingspan reaching about 7–8 centimetres (2.8–3.1 in). The basic colour of the uppersides of the wings is black, with a chain of yellowish or greenish spots at the edges. In the middle of the forewings there is a large yellowish or greenish area. The undersides of the wings are similar to the uppersides, but the basic colour is brownish and the spots are paler or whitish. The hindwings have a few red spots.

Subspecies G. e. jason (South India and Sri Lanka) — Males and females. Upperside black. Forewing: three slender, oblique, short pale green streaks in basal half of cell and two irregular small similarly-coloured spots near its apex; a discal band composed of pale green spots that gradually diminish in size anteriorly, the spot in interspace 5 the smallest, the two in the interspaces above it slightly larger; a spot at base of interspace 7 and a sinuous complete subterminal series of spots similarly coloured. Hindwing: a transverse band that extends as far as interspace 2 posteriorly and is a continuation of the discal band on the forewing; the upper portion of this band white, the lower pale green; this is followed by a sinuous subterminal series of small pale green spots as on the forewing. Underside: brownish-fulvous black; markings similar, larger, their edges diffuse and all of a silvery white, slightly tinted with pale green. Hindwing in addition has a white basal streak that extends halfway down the dorsal margin; another shorter white subbasal streak from costa to the subcostal vein coalescent with the white of the discal band in the cell, the streak of ground colour that lies between this subbasal and the discal band jet black, interrupted where it crosses vein 8 by a crimson spot; finally, quadrate black spots near apex of cell and at bases of interspaces 1, 2 and 3, all outwardly margined with crimson. Antenna, head, thorax and abdomen black; beneath: the palpi, thorax and abdomen touched with white, the abdomen with dingy white lateral lines. Male has an abdominal fold within grey, with a fringe of white hairs.

Subspecies G. e. axion, Felder (Malayan region and Himalayas) can be distinguished from subspecies G. e. jason as follows: The markings that compose the discal band very much broader; all the spots and markings of pale green and white conspicuously larger, especially in the spring broods. Underside of hindwing: crimson spots more conspicuous, a line of crimson along the posterior portion of the dorsal margin; in most specimens the short subbasal narrow band of white that runs from the costa to the subcostal vein does not coalesce with the white of the discal band where it crosses the cell.

== Gallery ==
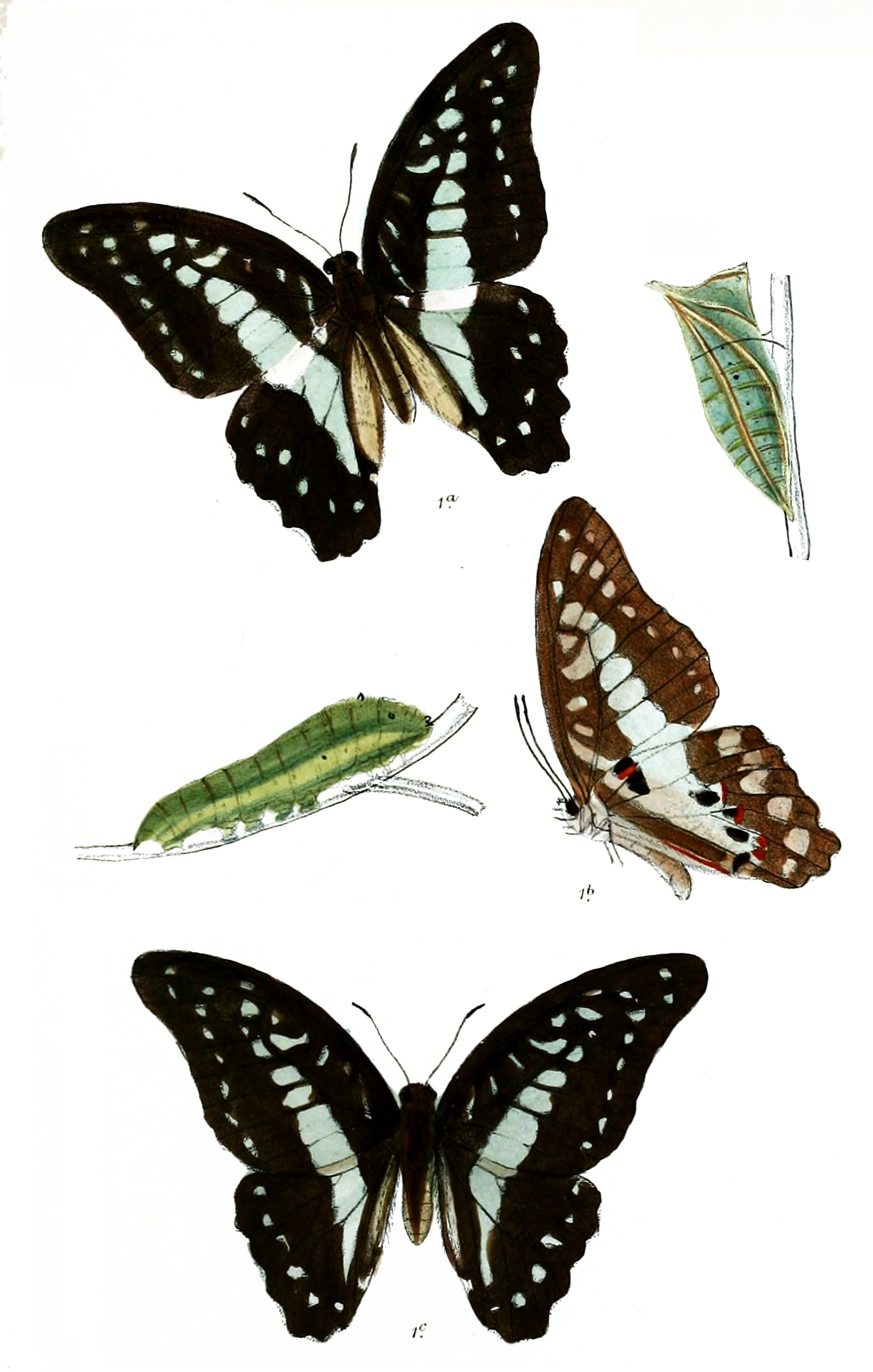
Subspecies G. e. jason

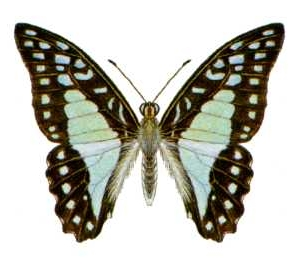
Dorsal view

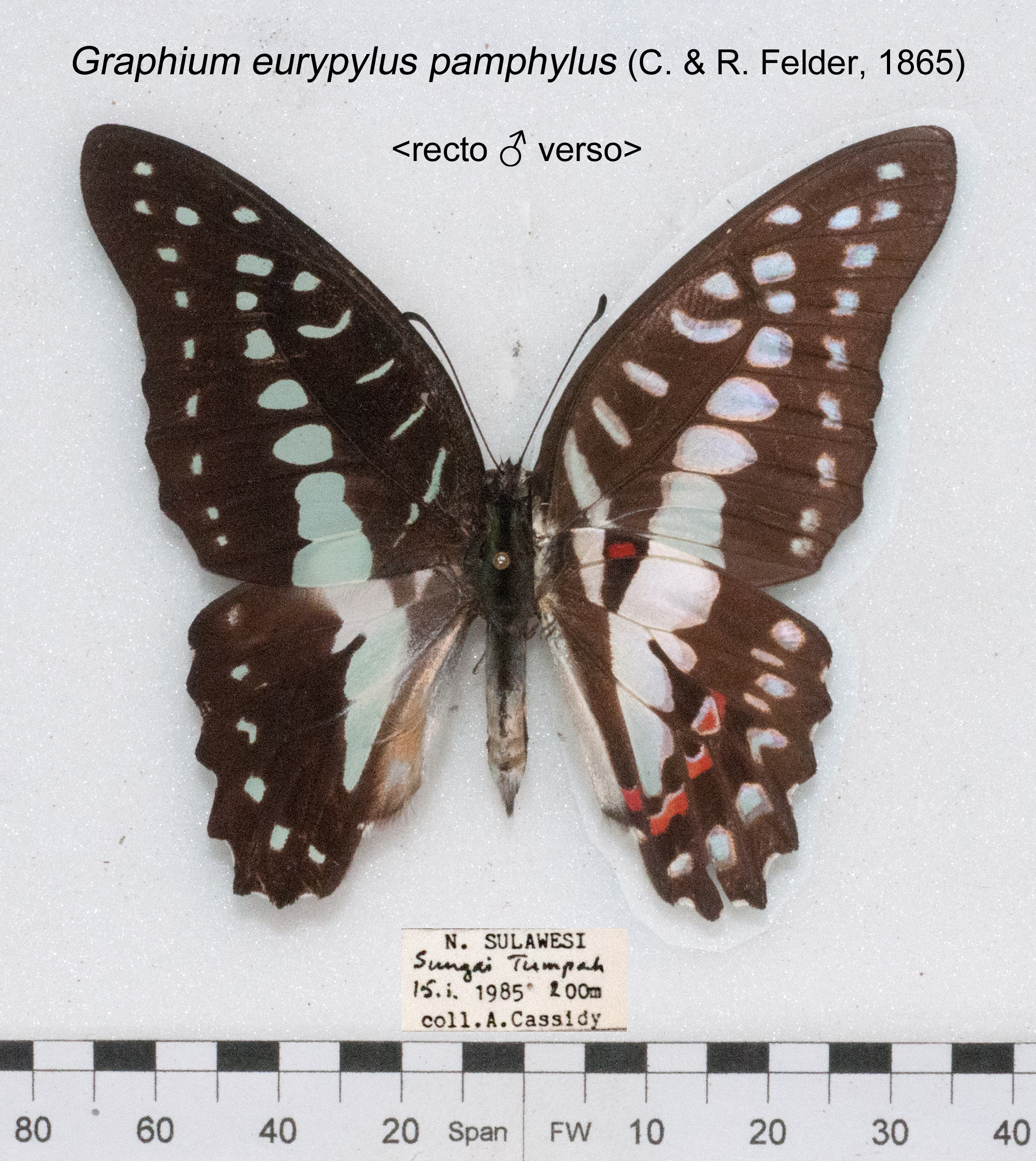

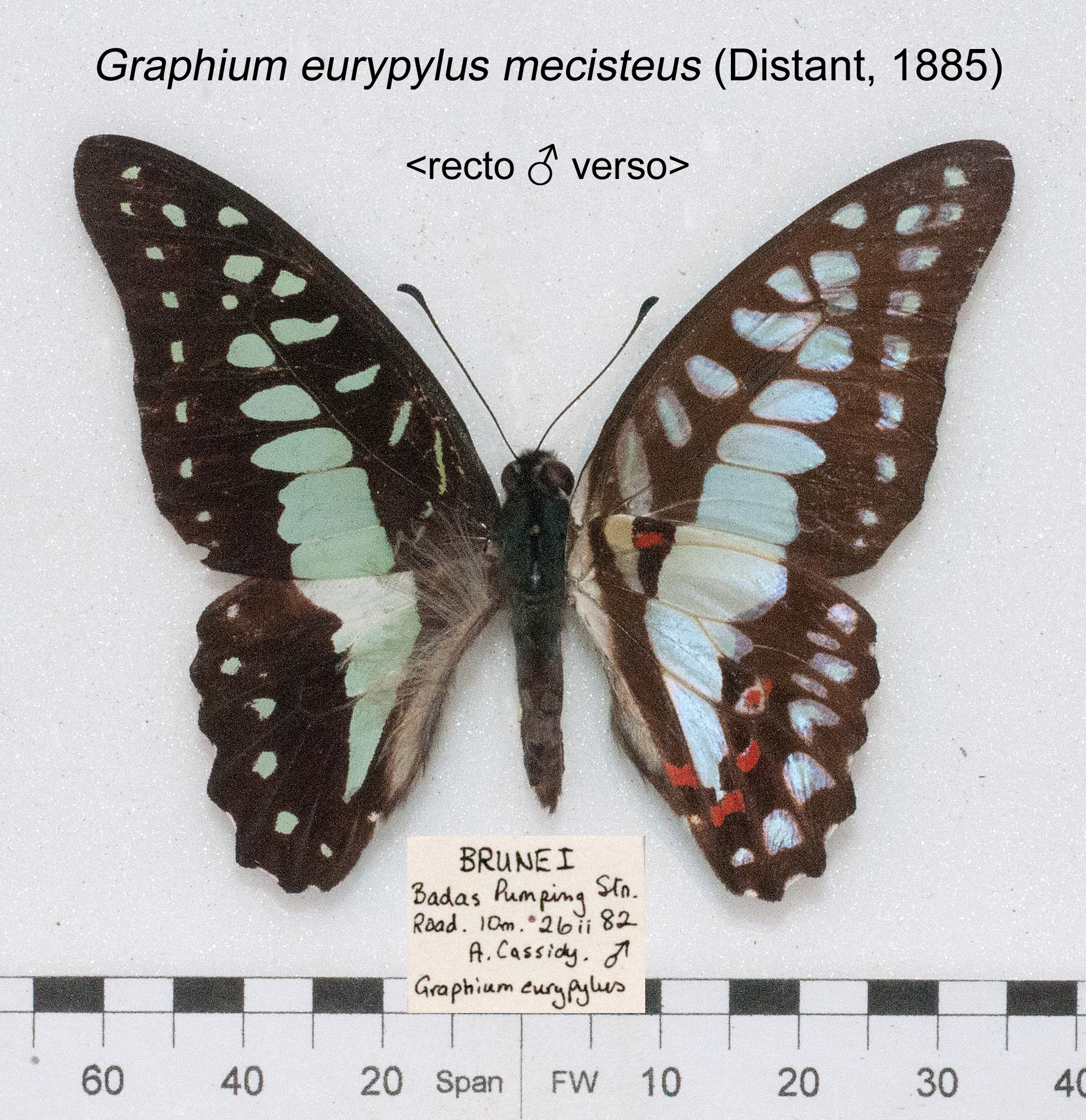

== Life cycle ==
=== Larva ===
"Very like that of P. agamemnon, but the second pair of spines is entirely wanting and the third pair, which in agamemnon is rather long, curved and sharp, is reduced in this species to mere knobs encircled with a black ring. The colour is generally black or smoky until the last moult and then dull green, inclining to rusty brown on the sides, but some of our specimens remained quite black to the end." (Davidson and Aitken quoted in Bingham, 1907)

Larvae mainly feed on various species of Annonaceae family (Annona cherimola, Annona glabra, Annona reticulata, Annona muricata, Annona squamosa, Pseuduvaria froggattii, Artabotrys speciosus, Goniothalamus macranthus, Uvaria leichhardtii, Uvaria rupestris, Uvaria siamensis, Monoon longifolium, Huberantha nitidissima, Uvaria rufa), as well as on Michelia champaca (Magnoliaceae) and Diploglottis australis (Sapindaceae).

=== Pupa ===
"The distinguishing mark of the pupa is again in the frontal horn, which is straight as in agamemnon, but directed forward instead of being almost erect. Its colour is normally green, but varies with that of the object to which it is attached." (Davidson and Aitken quoted in Bingham, 1907)

== Subspecies ==
- Graphium eurypylus artofasciatus (Lathy, 1899) (Sula Islands)
- Graphium eurypylus aloricus (Fruhstorfer, 1909) (Alor)
- Graphium eurypylus cheronus (Jordan, 1909) (Sikkim – southern Burma, Thailand – southern China, southern Yunnan, Hainan, Indo-China)
- Graphium eurypylus crispus (Fruhstorfer, 1903) (Babber Islands)
- Graphium eurypylus eurypylus (Moluccas)
- Graphium eurypylus extensus (Rothschild, 1895) (New Britain, New Ireland, Duke of York Group, New Hanover)
- Graphium eurypylus gordion (C. & R. Felder, 1865) (Philippines)
- Graphium eurypylus insularius (Rothschild, 1896) (Tanahdjampea, Kalao)
- Graphium eurypylus lepidus (Fruhstorfer, 1904) (Tanimbar)
- Graphium eurypylus lutorius (Fruhstorfer, 1907) (Batjan)
- Graphium eurypylus lycaon (C. & R. Felder, 1865) (eastern Australia)
- Graphium eurypylus lycaonides (Rothschild, 1895) (Waigeu, Jobi, West Papua)
- Graphium eurypylus macronius (Jordan, 1909) (Andamans, ?Nicobars)
- Graphium eurypylus mecisteus (Distant, 1885) (Peninsular Malaya, Sumatra, Java, Borneo, Philippines)
- Graphium eurypylus melampus (Rothschild, 1896) (Kai Islands)
- Graphium eurypylus nyctimus (Waterhouse & Lyell, 1914) (Northern Territory)
- Graphium eurypylus pamphylus (C. & R. Felder, 1865) (Sulawesi)
- Graphium eurypylus pauli Page & Treadaway 2014 (Buton Island and Muna Island. Indonesia)
- Graphium eurypylus sallastius (Staudinger, 1895) (Wetar, Sumbawa)
- Graphium eurypylus sangira (Oberthür, 1879) (Sangir)
- Graphium eurypylus sallastinus (Fruhstorfer, 1903) (Sumba, Flores, Wetar, Leti, Babar)

== See also ==
- List of butterflies of India (Papilionidae)
