= Chamuvarinin =

Identifiers
3D model (JSmol)	Interactive image
ChEMBL	ChEMBL457676
ChemSpider	17267231
PubChem CID	11342455
- InChI: InChI=1S/C37H64O6/c1-3-4-5-15-19-30-20-17-22-33(41-30)34-25-26-36(43-34)35-24-23-32(42-35)31(38)21-16-13-11-9-7-6-8-10-12-14-18-29-27-28(2)40-37(29)39/h27-28,30-36,38H,3-26H2,1-2H3/t28-,30?,31+,32+,33?,34?,35+,36?/m0/s1 Key: IWOYCFRIFNMRSY-PWPZFVDCSA-N
- SMILES: CCCCCCC1CCCC(O1)C2CCC(O2)[C@H]3CC[C@@H](O3)[C@@H](CCCCCCCCCCCCC4=C[C@@H](OC4=O)C)O

Properties
Chemical formula	C_{37}H_{64}O_{6}
Molar mass	604.913 g·mol^{−1}
- Except where otherwise noted, data are given for materials in their standard state (at 25 °C [77 °F], 100 kPa). Infobox references

Chamuvarinin is an acetogenin found in Uvaria chamae.

(+)-Chamuvarinin was synthesized in 2010 by a research group from the University of St Andrews led by Gordon Florence.
