= Melodorum fruticosum =

Melodorum fruticosum is a botanical scientific name that may refer to the following plant species:

- Uvaria siamensis, known in Thai as nom maew, of which the name is a synonym
- Sphaerocoryne lefevrei, known in Thai as lamduan, to which the name has commonly been incorrectly applied
