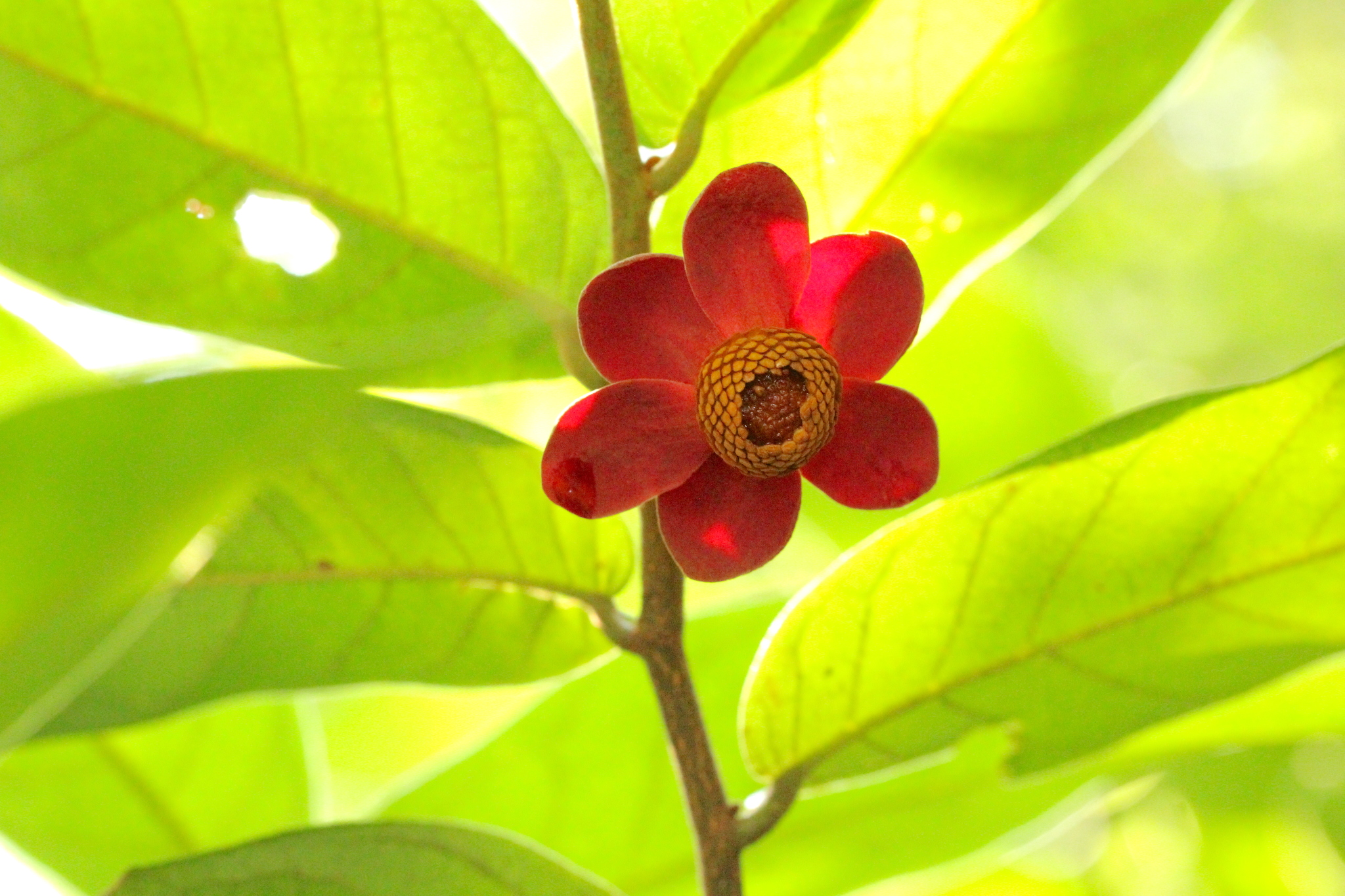

Scientific classification
- Kingdom: Plantae
- Clade: Tracheophytes
- Clade: Angiosperms
- Clade: Magnoliids
- Order: Magnoliales
- Family: Annonaceae
- Genus: Uvaria
- Species: U. macrophylla

Binomial name
- Uvaria macrophylla Roxb.

= Uvaria macrophylla =

Species of flowering plant in the soursop family

Uvaria macrophylla, also known by its common name large-leaved uvaria, is a species of flowering plant in the family Annonaceae. The species was originally described by William Roxburgh in 1832. The name is a synonym of Uvaria littoralis (Blume) Blume.
