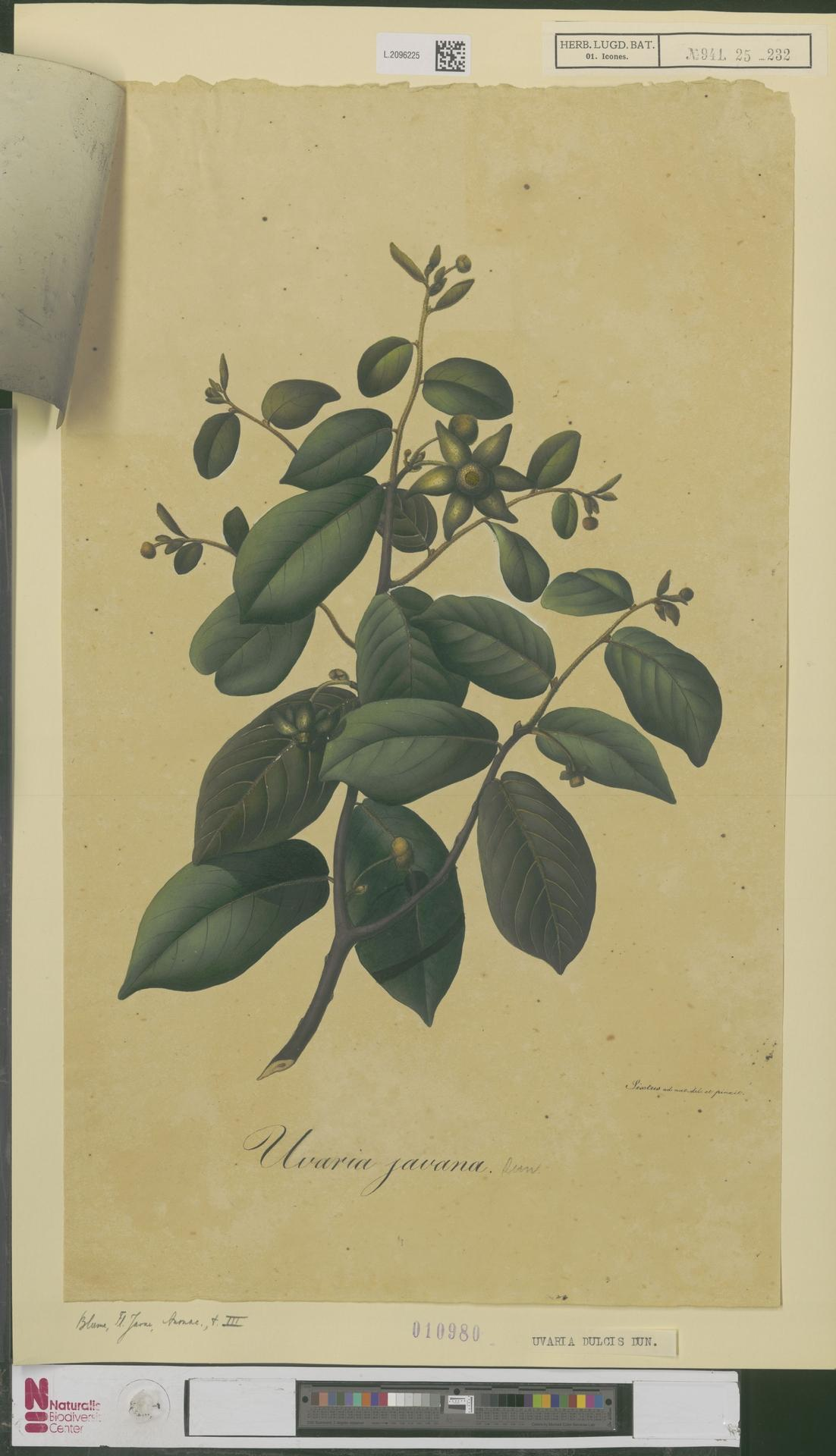

Scientific classification
- Kingdom: Plantae
- Clade: Tracheophytes
- Clade: Angiosperms
- Clade: Magnoliids
- Order: Magnoliales
- Family: Annonaceae
- Genus: Uvaria
- Species: U. dulcis

Binomial name
- Uvaria dulcis Dunal

Synonyms
- Anomianthus auritus (Blume) Backer; Anomianthus dulcis (Dunal) J.Sinclair; Anomianthus heterocarpus (Blume) Zoll.; Unona heterocarpa (Blume) Miq.; Uva aurita (Blume) Kuntze; Uva dulcis (Dunal) Kuntze; Uvaria aurita Blume; Uvaria cyrtopoda Miq.; Uvaria heterocarpa Blume; Uvaria javana Dunal; Uvaria pachychila Merr. ex Jovet-Ast

= Uvaria dulcis =

Species of plant in soursop family

Uvaria dulcis is a species of woody climber in the Annonaceae family. It is found in tropical Asia, in a disjunctive distribution, eastern Indonesia, Jawa, and then Mainland Southeast Asia. The plant has an edible fruit, which in Khmer language has the colourful name triël dâhs krabéi (="triel of the buffalo udders").

== Taxonomy ==
Phylogenetic analysis indicated that this species in a well-supported clade with Uvaria ferruginea and Uvaria siamensis and a weak clade with Uvaria hahnii The most recent taxonomic analysis (2018) shows for taxonomic traits (anatomical features), the species is in a clade with Uvaria cuneifolia and Uvaria pauciovulata, and these are in a clade with U. hahnii, U. ferruginea, and U. siamensis. However, their DNA analysis showed U. dulcis in a clade with Uvaria dasoclema and U. ferruginea, embedded in a clade with U. hahnii.

The species was named by the French botanist Michel Félix Dunal (1789–1856), in 1817. He was chair of natural history at the University of Montpellier for 40 years. He described the taxa in the work Monographie de la famille des anonacées. The taxa was known as Anomianthus heterocarpus from 1858, as described by the Swiss botanist Heinrich Zollinger (1818–1859), who worked and died in Jawa. The Orcadian botanist James Sinclair (1913–1968), of the Royal Botanic Garden Edinburgh and the Singapore Botanic Gardens, recognised that the species epithet dulcis had priority and the taxa became known as Anomianthus dulcis from 1958. In 2009 phylogenetic analysis by Zhou, Su and Saunders showed that the genus Anomianthus was part of the Uvaria genus and the name U. dulcis was once more accepted. J.F. Maxwell had considered the plant was in the Uvaria genus in 1975.

== Description ==
A sarmentose shrub or woody climber (liana), up to 30 m (98 ft) in length. The leaves range from elliptic to broadly-elliptic, to shortly-obovate with a subcordate to shortly-cordate base and acute apex. The flowers of the plant are yellowish-green and fragrant, and the fruits are yellow and red in colour. Petals are narrow, inner petals are narrower, the inner petals have a pair of marginal glands (nectaries). The carpels have one or two ovules. Distinguishing features include: the broadly-elliptic to shortly-obovate leaves with retuse to shortly-cordate base and acute apex; 15–18 subparallel leaf-veins, which frequently branch basally and medially; tomentose indument on younger shoots, sparse later, becoming subglabrous, except over midrib which is tomentose with about 1 mm long erect hairs; the inner petals glands; coriaceous to membranous, flattened petals, at first broadly-elliptical to acute, then expanding at maturity to obovate to acute, about 21.5 by 11.5 mm in size; about 14–16 ovules.

== Distribution ==
The species is native to a disjunctive area, covering parts of Mainland Southeast Asia and eastern Malesia. Countries and regions where the taxa occurs are: Indonesia (Nusa Tenggara, Maluku Islands, Jawa); Thailand; Cambodia; Vietnam; Laos; Myanmar.

== Habitat and ecology ==
Often found in scrub vegetation, but most common in disturbed moist forests (in which it can form large patches of population). Common in the lower rainfall areas of central Jawa and northeastern Thailand.

Within the Khao Khiao–Khao Chomphu Wildlife Sanctuary, Chonburi Province, central Thailand, there is lowland evergreen forest (up to 600m altitude), with an upper canopy 40m high dominated by Dipterocarpus alatus, Pterospermum diversifolium, Walsura pinnata, Irvingia malayana, Ficus annulata, Ficus capillipes, and Ficus sundaica. U. dulcis is one of the vines and small climbers found in this community.

== Vernacular names ==
- Thai: นมแมวซ้อน, romanized: nom maew son
- Khmer: ទ្រៀលដោះក្របី, romanized: triël dâhs krabéi, lit. 'triel of the buffalo udders'

== Uses ==
The fruit, the same size as buffalo udders (see #Vernacular names), are much appreciated as a snack or titbit in Cambodia, and are sold in the market in March and April.

In Thai traditional medicine, a water decoction of the plant has been used as fever treatment and as to promote milk production.
