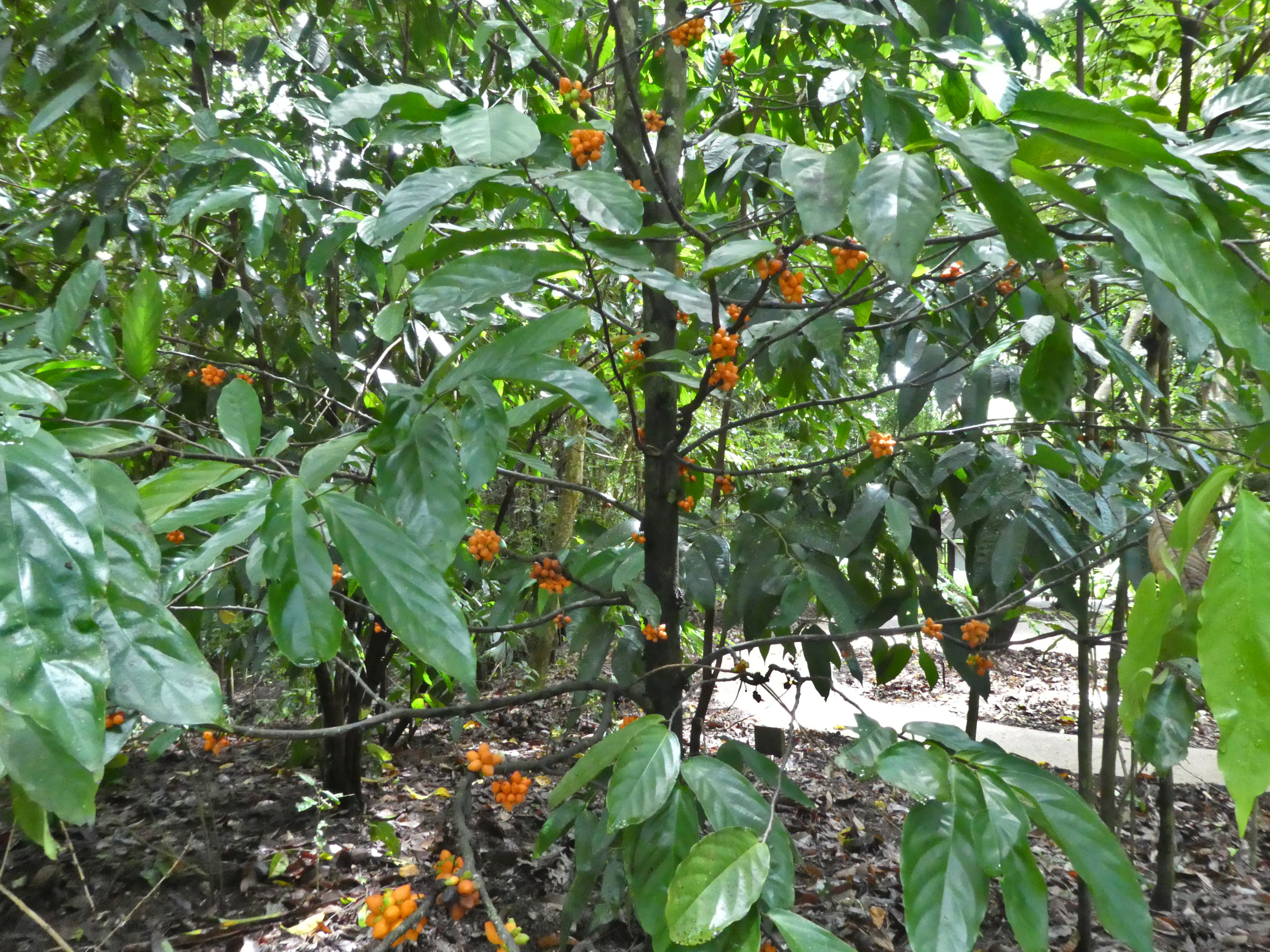
- Tree with fruit in Cairns Botanic Gardens

Conservation status
- Least Concern (NCA)
- Least Concern (IUCN 3.1)

Scientific classification
- Kingdom: Plantae
- Clade: Embryophytes
- Clade: Tracheophytes
- Clade: Spermatophytes
- Clade: Angiosperms
- Clade: Magnoliids
- Order: Magnoliales
- Family: Annonaceae
- Genus: Pseuduvaria
- Species: P. froggattii

Binomial name
- Pseuduvaria froggattii (F.Muell.) Jessup
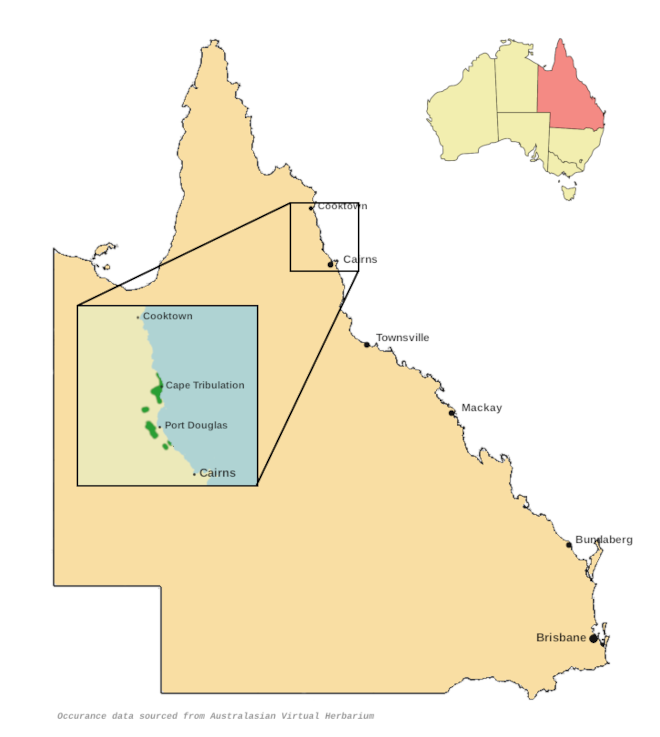

Synonyms
- Mitrephora froggattii F.Muell.

= Pseuduvaria froggattii =

Species of plant in the soursop family

Pseuduvaria froggattii is a rare species of tree which is restricted to a very small part of northeastern Queensland, Australia. It is a member of the custard apple and soursop family Annonaceae, and was first described in 1887. Despite the small range its status considered to be least concern.

== Description ==
Pseuduvaria froggattii is a small rainforest tree reaching 15 m (49 ft) in height and a DBH (trunk diameter) of up to 15 cm (5.9 in). It has elliptic to lanceolate, membranous to papery leaves that measure up to 30 cm (12 in) long by 9 cm (3.5 in) wide. They are obtuse to rounded at the base and acuminate (tapering) at the tip, with the tapering portion 10–26 mm (0.4–1.0 in) long. They are glabrous (hairless) on their upper and lower surfaces and have 7–10 pairs of secondary veins branching from the rachis, or midrib. The hairless petiole is 4–10 mm (0.16–0.39 in) long with a narrow groove on the upper side.

This species is dioecious, meaning that pistilate (functionally female) and staminate (functionally male) flowers are borne on separate plants. The inflorescences of both male and female plants are dense clusters produced from the trunk, branches and twigs. The male plants may also produce flowers in the leaf axils, in which case the inflorescence will consist of just one or few flowers. Flowers are held on pedicels that are minutely hairy, measure up to 32 mm (1.3 in) long, and are tapered with the thicker end attached to the flower.

The individual flowers are very distinctive, with an appearance somewhat reminiscent of a jingle bell (see gallery). Each flower has six petals arranged in two rows, with the petals of one row alternating with the other. The inner petals are larger, with a quite narrow base but a much wider tip. They arch over the flower centre and connect to each other, forming a dome or canopy over the reproductive organs in the centre of the flower. The narrow bases of the petals ensure that there are three gaps on the sides of the dome that allow pollinators access to the stamens or stigmas. The dome measures about 12–15 mm (0.47–0.59 in) wide and long.

The outer petals are smaller and are reflexed outwards, and since these petals alternate with the inner petals, they are thus positioned adjacent to the gaps formed by the latter. The outer petals are rounded, measuring about 9 mm (0.35 in) long by 8 mm (0.31 in) wide.

The fruit are yellow or orange when ripe, obovoid to ellipsoid in shape (i.e. like a Rugby ball), and measure about 20 mm (0.79 in) long. They contain one or two rugose (wrinkled) seeds.

=== Reproductive biology ===
The pollen of P. froggattii is shed as permanent tetrads. Its flowers are pollinated by flies, including Drosophilidae and dung flies.

=== Phytochemistry ===
Oils extracted from its leaves contain high levels of caryophyllene and spathulenol.

== Taxonomy ==
The species was first described by the German-born Australian botanist Ferdinand von Mueller, who gave it the name Mitrephora froggattii. His description was based on plant material collected 1886 by W. Sayer and W. Froggatt from the Mossman River, and was published in January 1887 in the Australasian Journal of Pharmacy. In 1986 the Australian botanist Laurence W. Jessup gave the species the new combination Pseuduvaria froggattii, which was published in a brief one page paper in the journal of the Queensland Herbarium Austrobaileya. This was followed by a formal description published in 1987, also in Austrobaileya.

=== Etymology ===
The genus name Pseuduvaria is derived from a combination of the Ancient Greek word pseúdō, meaning "false", and the name of the related genus Uvaria. The species epithet froggattii was given by Mueller to honour Froggatt as one of the collectors of specimens he examined.

== Distribution and habitat ==
This species is restricted to a small part of Queensland's Wet Tropics, from Melissa Creek near Cape Tribulation in the north, to the area around Black Mountain, southwest of Port Douglas. The total area of occupancy of this species is just 128 km^{2} (49 sq mi) with 145 observation records.

It grows as an understory tree in rainforest on a variety of soil types including loose mixtures, moist substrates, loams and rocky soils in mature rainforests at elevations of 5–60 m (16–197 ft).

== Ecology ==
Pseuduvaria froggattii is the host species for the larvae of the green-spotted triangle and pale green triangle butterflies. The fruits are eaten by cassowaries.

== Conservation ==
This species is listed by the Queensland Department of Environment and Science as least concern. As of 25 November 2023, it has not been assessed by the International Union for Conservation of Nature (IUCN).

== Gallery ==
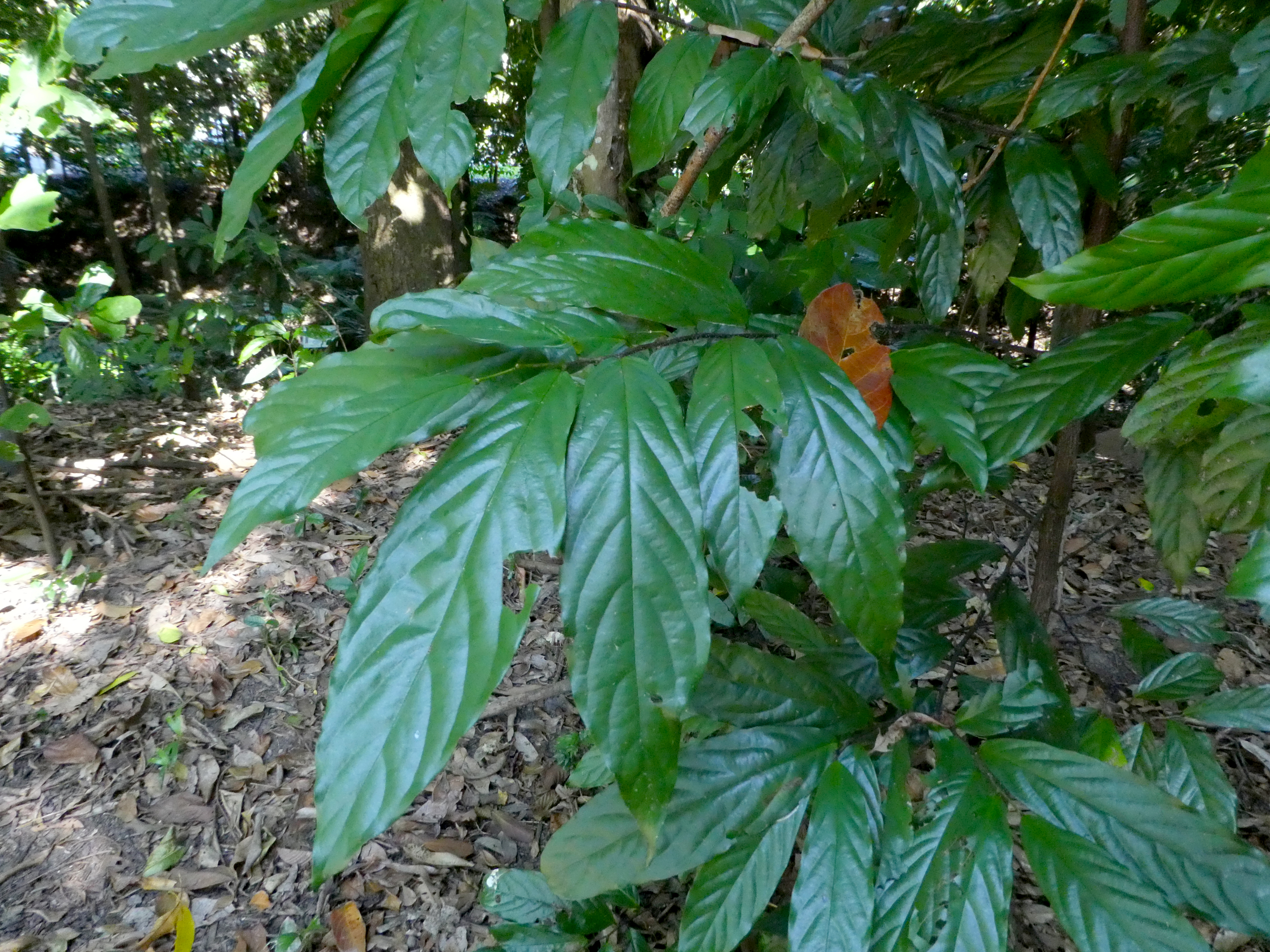
Foliage

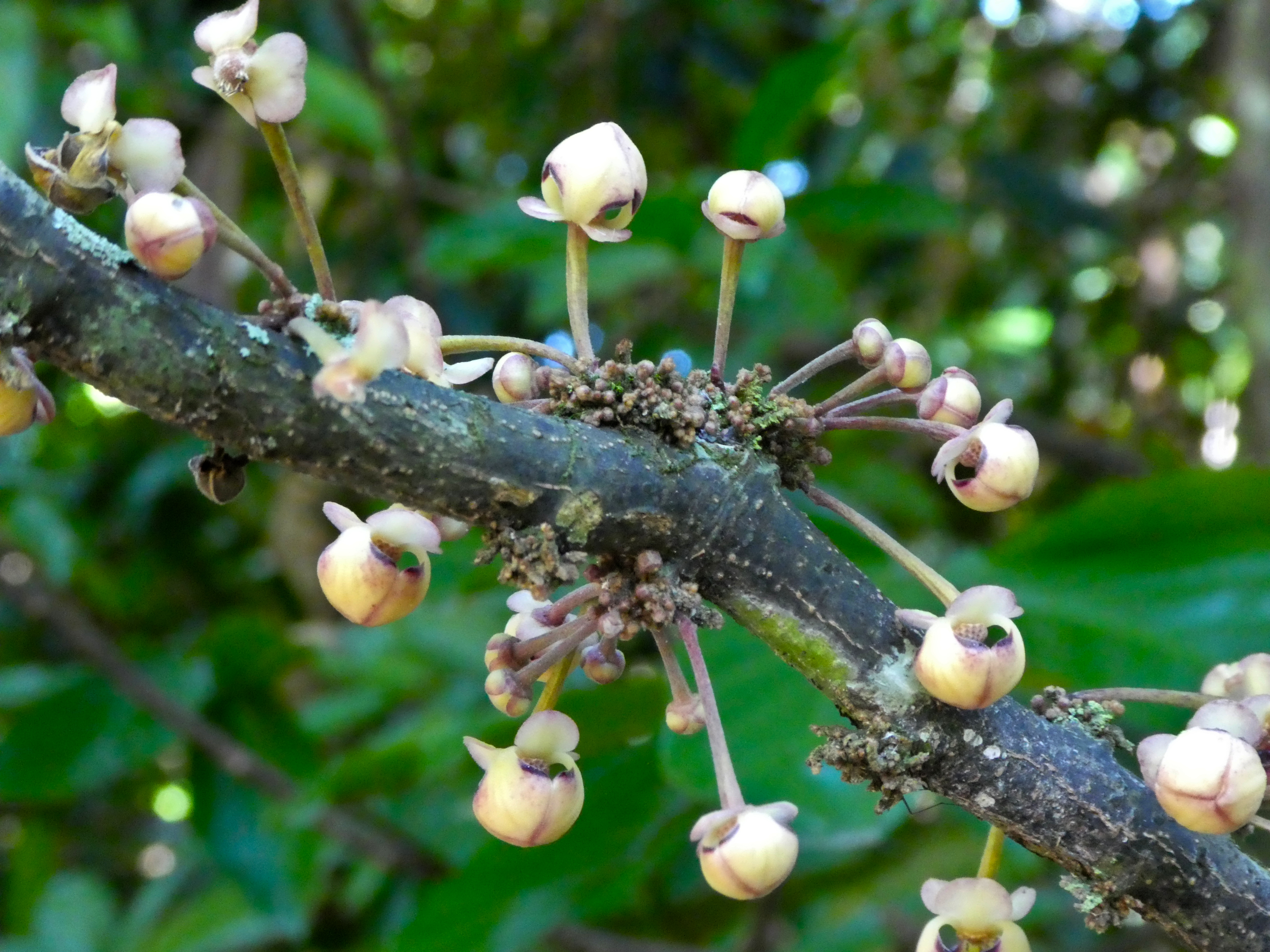
Inflorescence

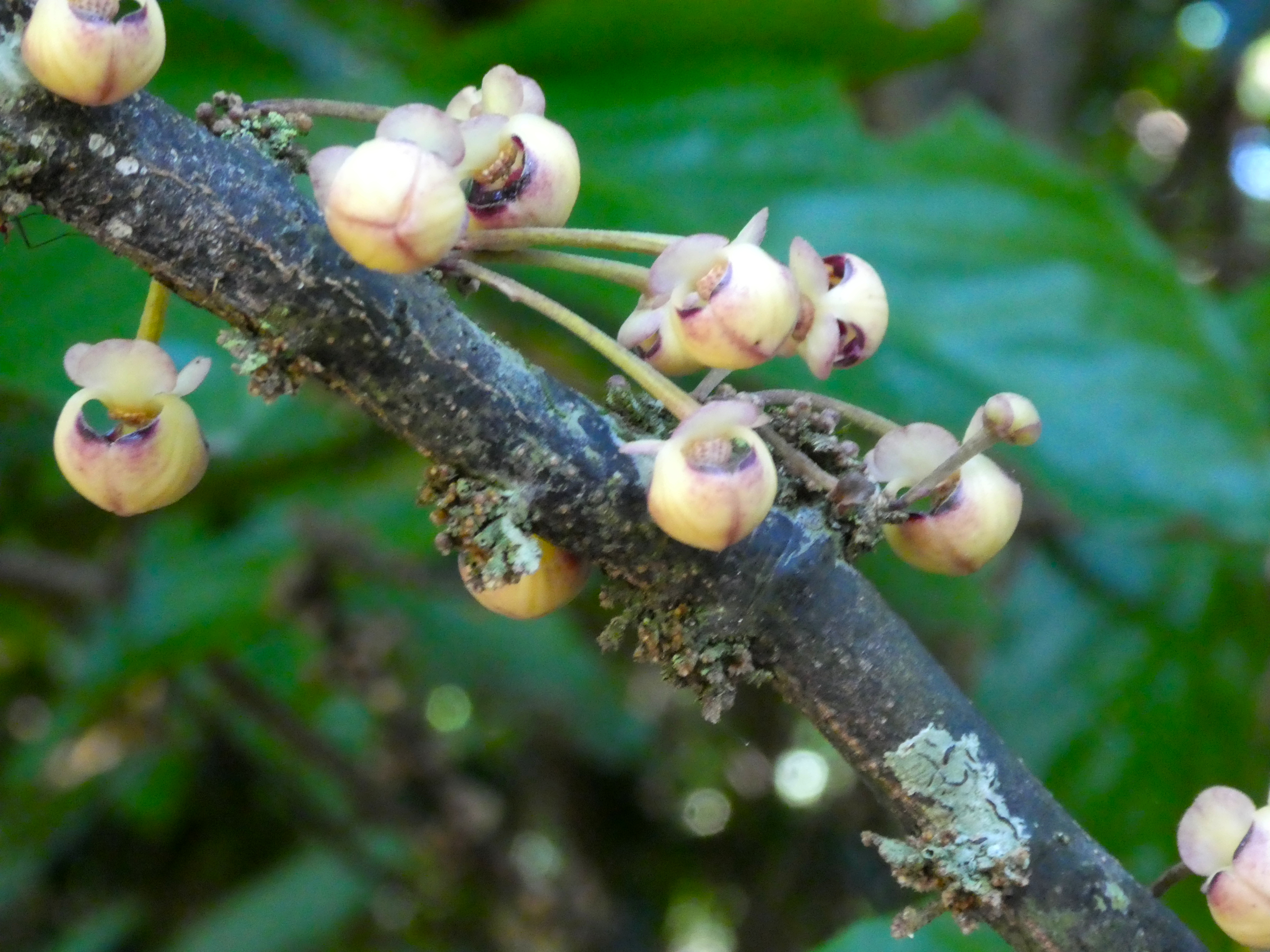
Close up of flowers

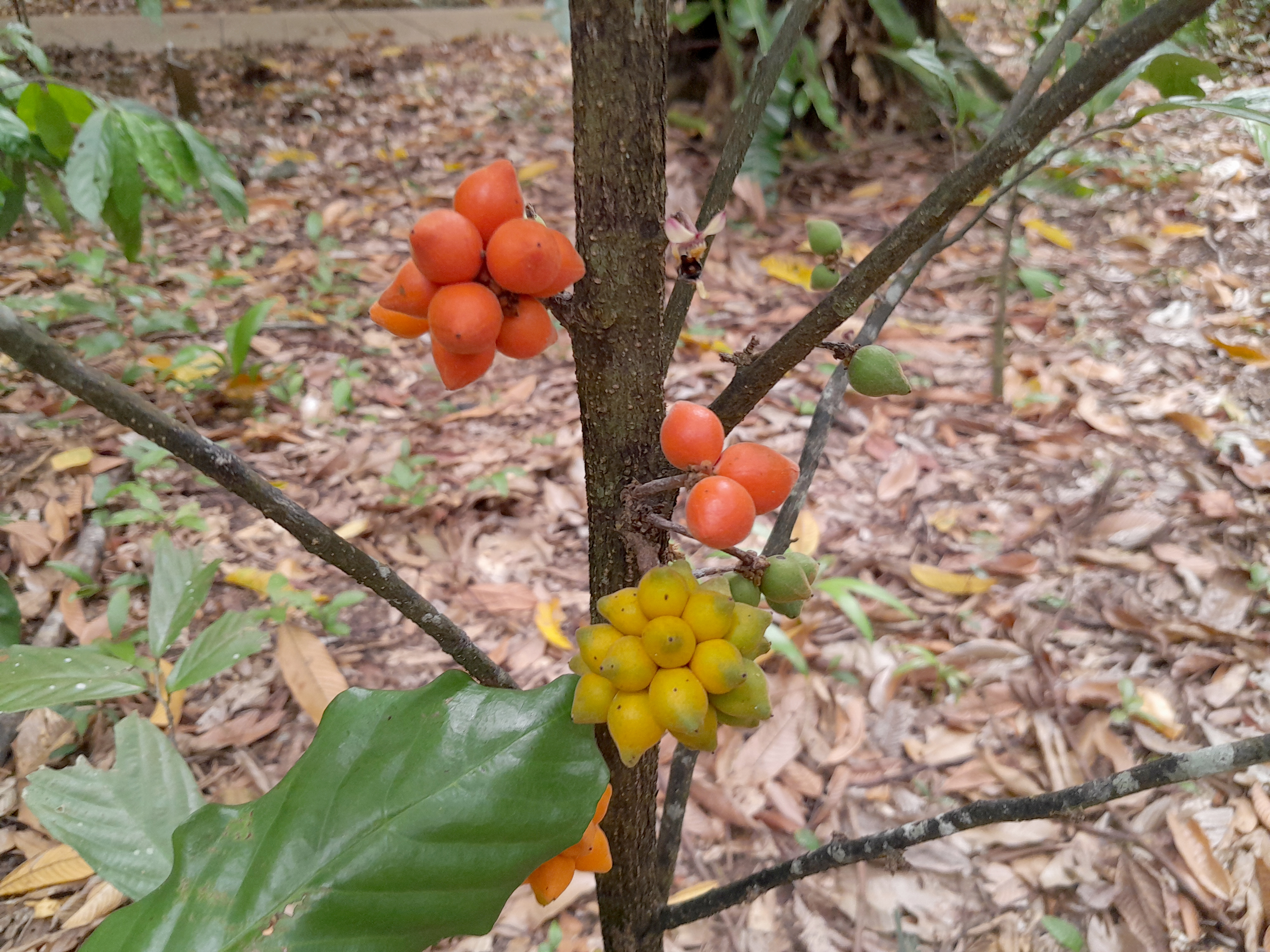
Ripe and immature fruit

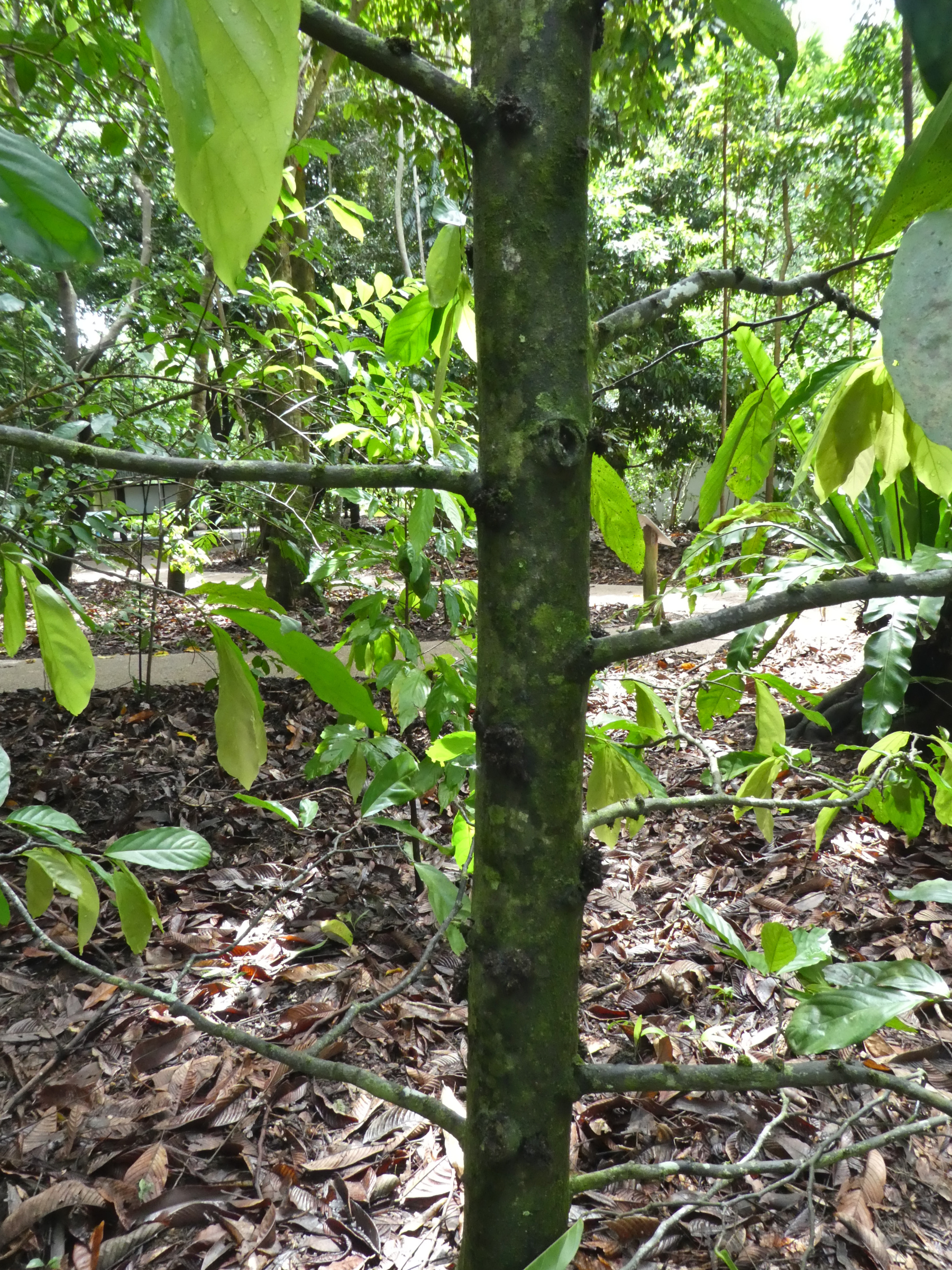
Stem
