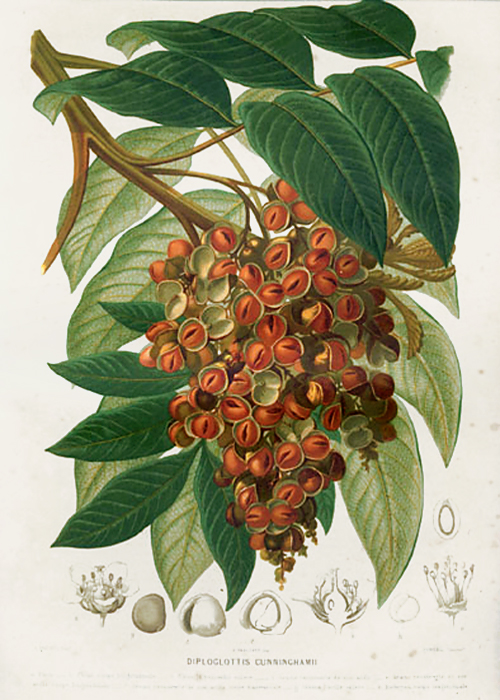
- 1886 illustration by Auguste Faguet

Conservation status
- Least Concern (IUCN 3.1)

Scientific classification
- Kingdom: Plantae
- Clade: Tracheophytes
- Clade: Angiosperms
- Clade: Eudicots
- Clade: Rosids
- Order: Sapindales
- Family: Sapindaceae
- Genus: Diploglottis
- Species: D. australis

Binomial name
- Diploglottis australis (G.Don) Radlk.
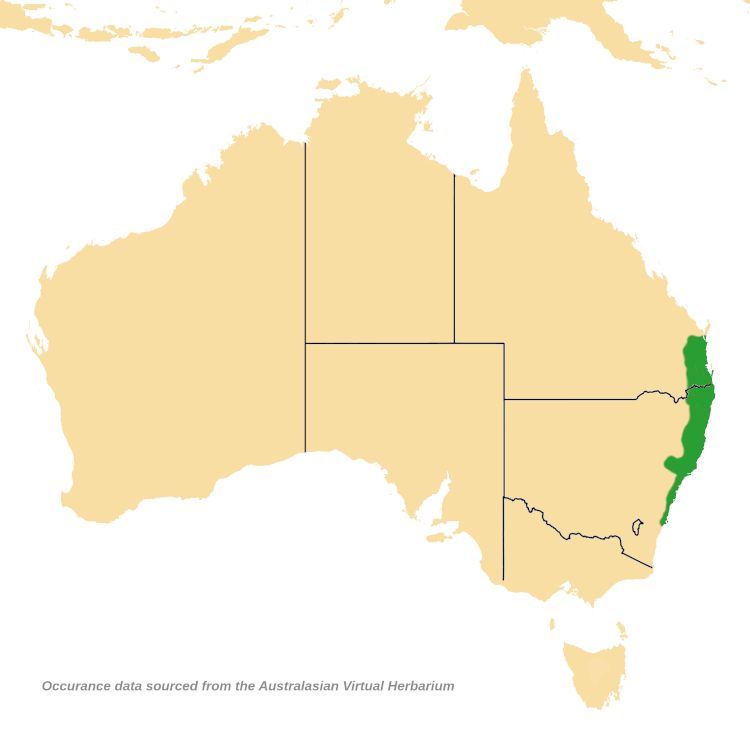

Synonyms
- Melicoccus australis (G.Don) Steud.; Stadtmannia australis G.Don; Cupania cunninghamii Hook.; Diploglottis cunninghamii (Hook.) Hook.f.; Diploglottis cunninghamii var. diphyllostegia J.F.Bailey; Stadtmannia australis A.Cunn. ex Hook.

= Diploglottis australis =

Native tamarind

Species of tree

Diploglottis australis, commonly known as the native tamarind, is a species of large trees in the maple and lychee family Sapindaceae. It is native to the eastern Australian states of New South Wales and Queensland, where it occurs in coastal rainforests. It was first described in 1879, and is known for its abundant edible fruit which are used to make drinks and condiments.

== Description ==
Diploglottis australis is a large tree to about 35 m (115 ft) tall, and the base of the trunk may be fluted. New growth is densely covered in fine rusty-brown hairs. The leaves are very large, measuring up to 135 cm (53 in) long. They are pinnate, with usually 8–12 stiff leaflets. The leaflets are generally between 15 to 30 cm (5.9 to 11.8 in) long and 5 to 10 cm (2.0 to 3.9 in) wide; they are dark green above and lighter below, their overall shape is oblong and they have blunt or rounded tips and slightly asymmetric bases. They have between 20 and 30 lateral veins either side of the midrib, and the leaflet margins are entire, i.e. without teeth or lobes.

Inflorescences are produced in the upper leaf axils and are much-branched, reaching up to 50 cm (20 in) in length. The numerous flowers are quite small, about 3 mm (0.12 in) diameter, with four or five greenish sepals and white petals. The flowers are functionally either male or female but both forms are present on each plant (i.e. the plants are monoecious). The "male" flowers have eight stamens arranged on one side of an undeveloped ovary, while the "female" flowers have a fully functional 3-locular ovary with sterile stamens (known as staminodes).

The fruit is a yellow-orange, 2- or 3-lobed capsule, about 3 cm (1.2 in) wide, covered lightly with pale rusty coloured hairs. Each matured lobe contains a single brown seed which is completely enclosed in a fleshy orange aril.

=== Phenology ===
Flowers usually appear from September to November, and fruit ripen between November and December.

== Taxonomy ==
The taxonomic history of this plant is complicated and involves a number of authors. The first published description was by George Don, based on a specimen that had been sent to England and planted at Kew Gardens. Don gave it the name Stadmannia australis and published it in his book A general history of the dichlamydeous plants in 1831. This validly published name was, however, ignored by botanists, and in fact the tree's label at Kew incorrectly attributed the name S. australis to Allan Cunningham.

In 1849 William Jackson Hooker transferred the plant to the genus Cupania, giving it the entirely new name C. cunninghami. Some years later, in 1862, botanist Joseph Dalton Hooker (son of William Jackson Hooker) created the new genus Diploglottis with the intention of transferring the species to the new genus, however, although he listed C. cunninghami as a synonym he failed to specifically state that the plant had been renamed to Diploglottis cunninghamii. That oversight was corrected the following year by another botanist, George Bentham.

At this point, under the naming rules that apply in botany, the full title of the species was

Diploglottis cunninghamii (Hook.) Hook.f. ex Benth.

which recognises W.J. Hooker as the original author, J.D. Hooker as a subsequent author whose publication was invalid under the rules, and Bentham who corrected the error and attributed the name to the younger Hooker. This name remained in use until 1878, when German botanist Ludwig Radlkofer, realising that the species was originally described by George Don and therefore Don's botanical name had precedence under the rules, published a work titled Ueber Sapindus und damit in zusammenhang stehende pflanzen (About Sapindus and related plants) in which he renamed the species yet again, leaving it in the genus Diploglottis but giving it Don's species epithet australis.

Finally, in 1981 Australian botanist Sally T. Reynolds published a paper in which she reverted the species to its former epithet cunninghamii – however she made a number of errors in tracing the history of the plant, and in 1986 botanists Gwen Harden and Lawrence Johnson returned it to its current name.

== Distribution and habitat ==
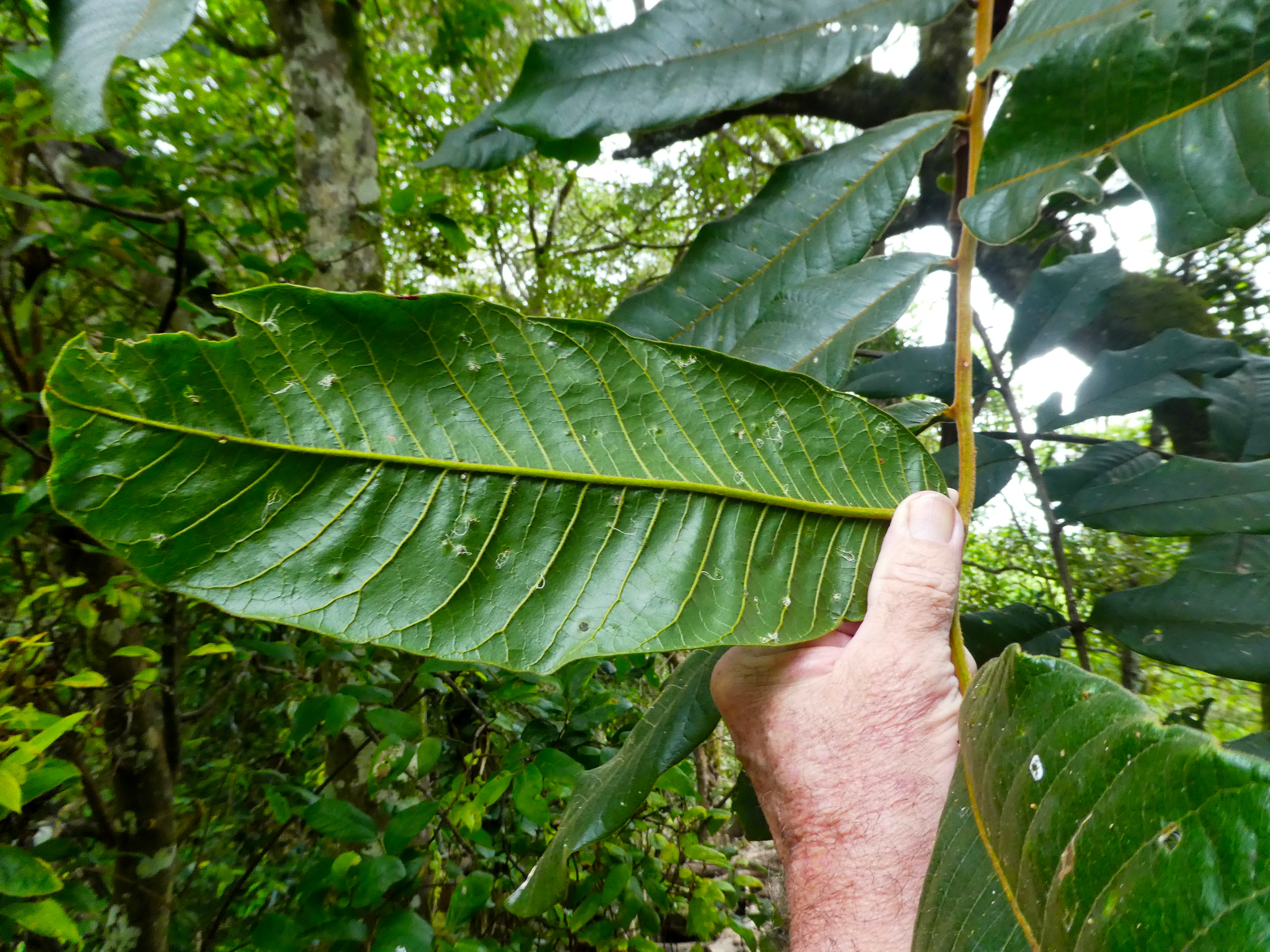
Leaflet underside

Diploglottis australis grows in subtropical, warm temperate and dry rainforests, on basaltic and rich alluvial soil from just north of Batemans Bay (~35.5° S) in New South Wales to near Maryborough (~25.5° S) in Queensland.

== Ecology ==
The fruit are eaten by fruit bats and a many bird species including fruit doves, pigeons, green catbirds and satin bowerbirds, while brush turkeys scavenge the fruit on the ground. The tree is also a host plant for the larvae of the pale green triangle (Graphium eurypylus) and the bright cornelian (Deudorix diovis) butterflies.

== Conservation ==
As of March 2025, this species has been assessed to be of least concern by the International Union for Conservation of Nature (IUCN) and by the Queensland Government under its Nature Conservation Act.

== Cultivation ==
The native tamarind makes an ideal park tree, and is widely cultivated in Australia due to its distinctive and attractive foliage, abundant colourful fruit and rust-coloured furry new growth flushes. The tree will usually only attain a height of about 10 m (33 ft) in cultivation (c.f. 35 m in a forest habitat) due to it not having to compete with nearby trees. The tree is ill-suited to situations where strong winds damage its large leaflets. It may also be grown as an indoor plant.

It can be propagated from fresh seed, which sprout readily, although good seeds may be difficult to find due to them being quickly eaten by fruit bats, birds and ants, as well as being attacked by butterfly larvae.

== Uses ==
The orange arils have a refreshing acid flavour—they may be eaten in the raw state and they have been used to make jams, jellies, sauces, chutneys, and cordials. The timber can be used for indoor works.

== Gallery ==
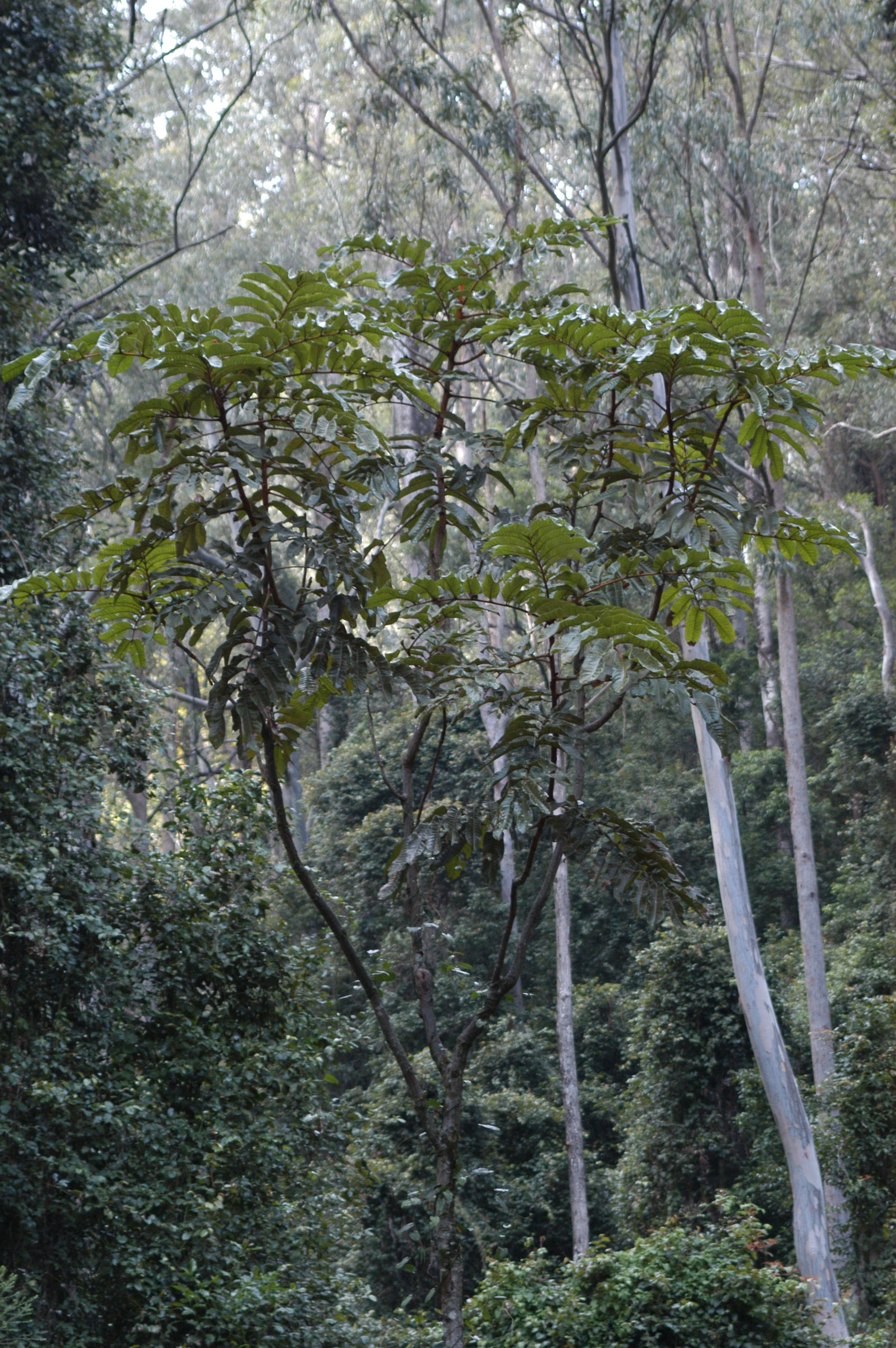
Habit

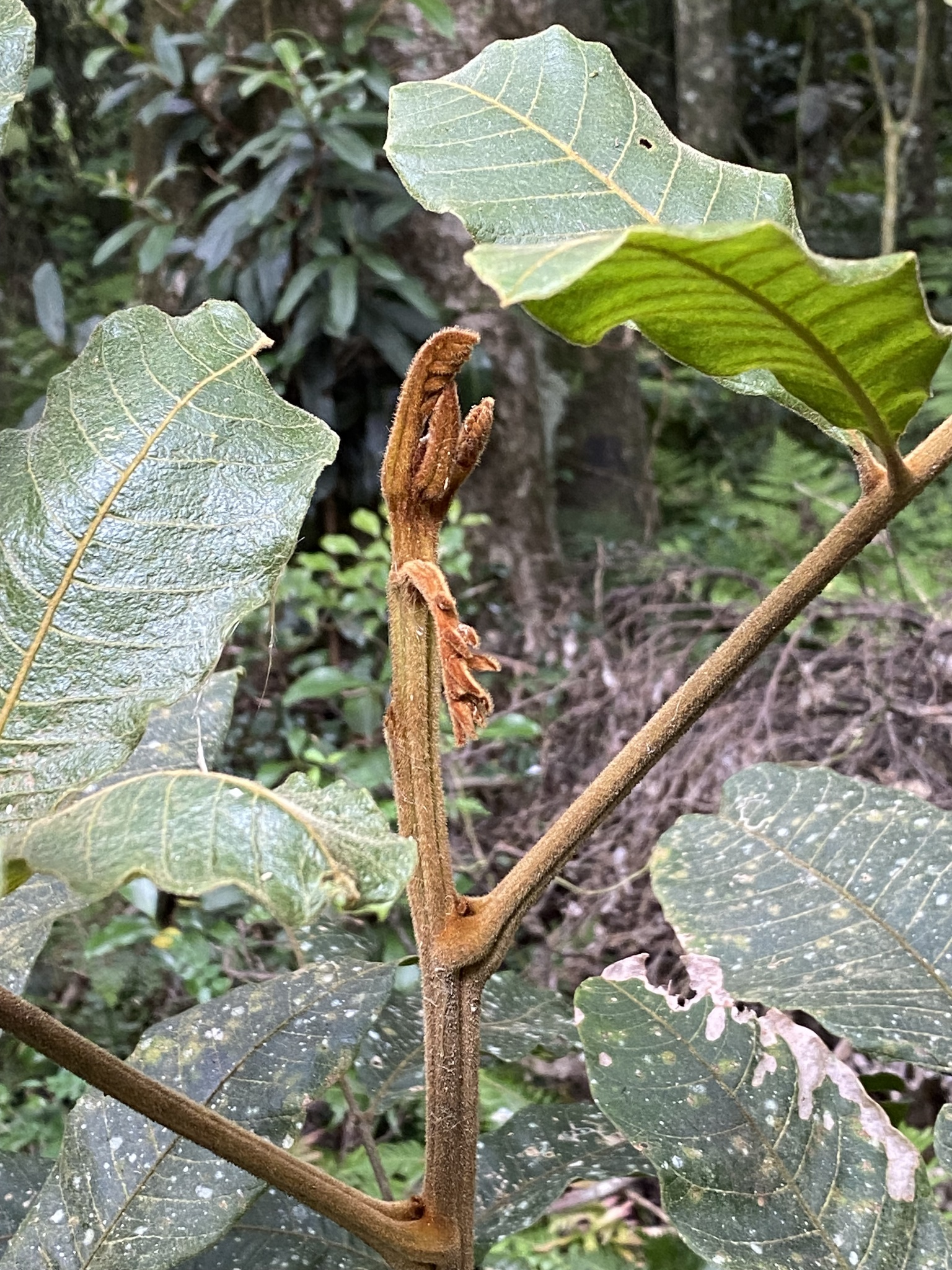
Rusty brown new leaf shoots

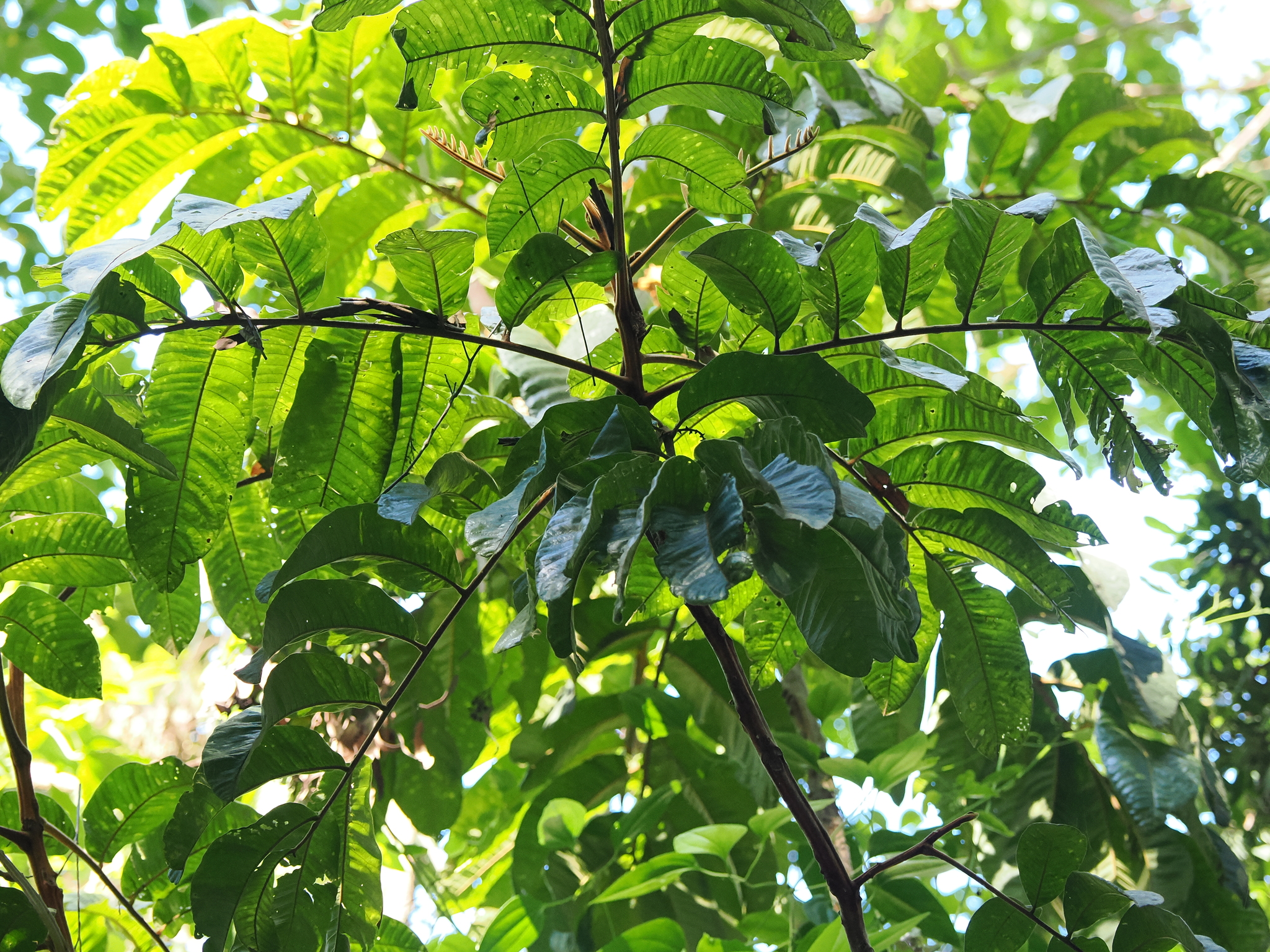
Crown, showing several compound leaves

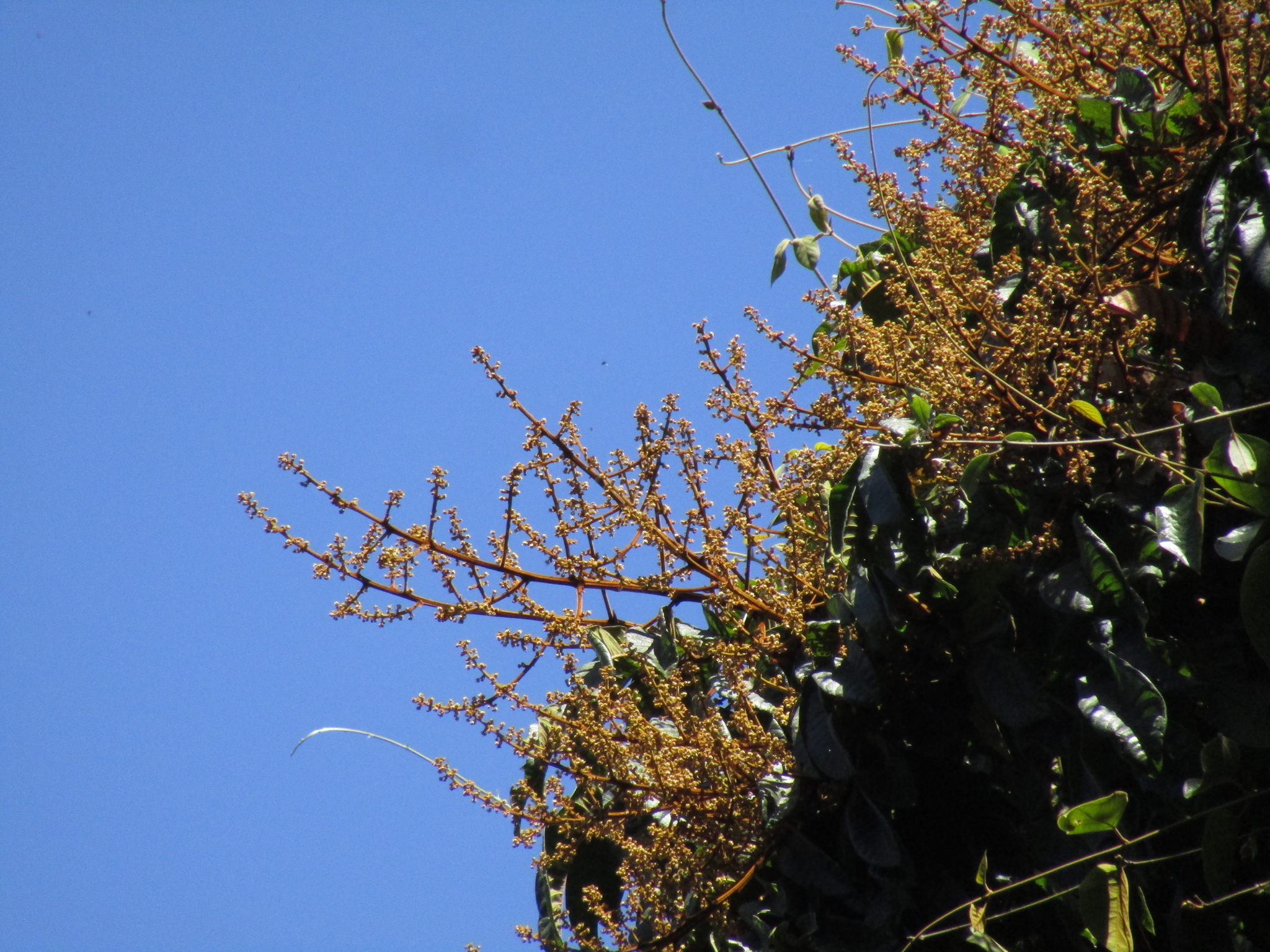
Flowers

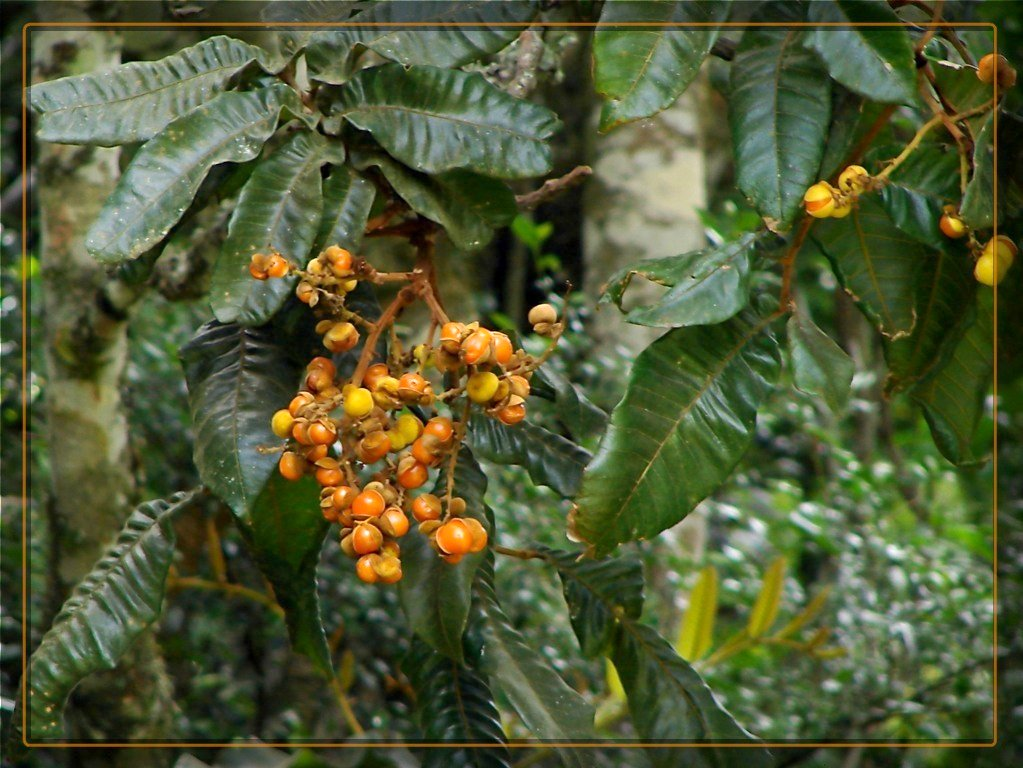
Fruit
