= Uvaria macclurei =

Conservation status
- Endangered (IUCN 3.1)

Scientific classification
- Kingdom: Plantae
- Clade: Tracheophytes
- Clade: Angiosperms
- Clade: Magnoliids
- Order: Magnoliales
- Family: Annonaceae
- Genus: Uvaria
- Species: U. macclurei

Binomial name
- Uvaria macclurei Diels (1931)

Synonyms
- Uvaria kweichowensis P.T.Li (1976)

Species of flowering plant

Uvaria kweichowensis is a species of plant in the Annonaceae family. It is a shrub or climbing liana endemic to southern China, where it grows in Yunnan, southwestern Guizhou, western Guangxi, and Hainan.
