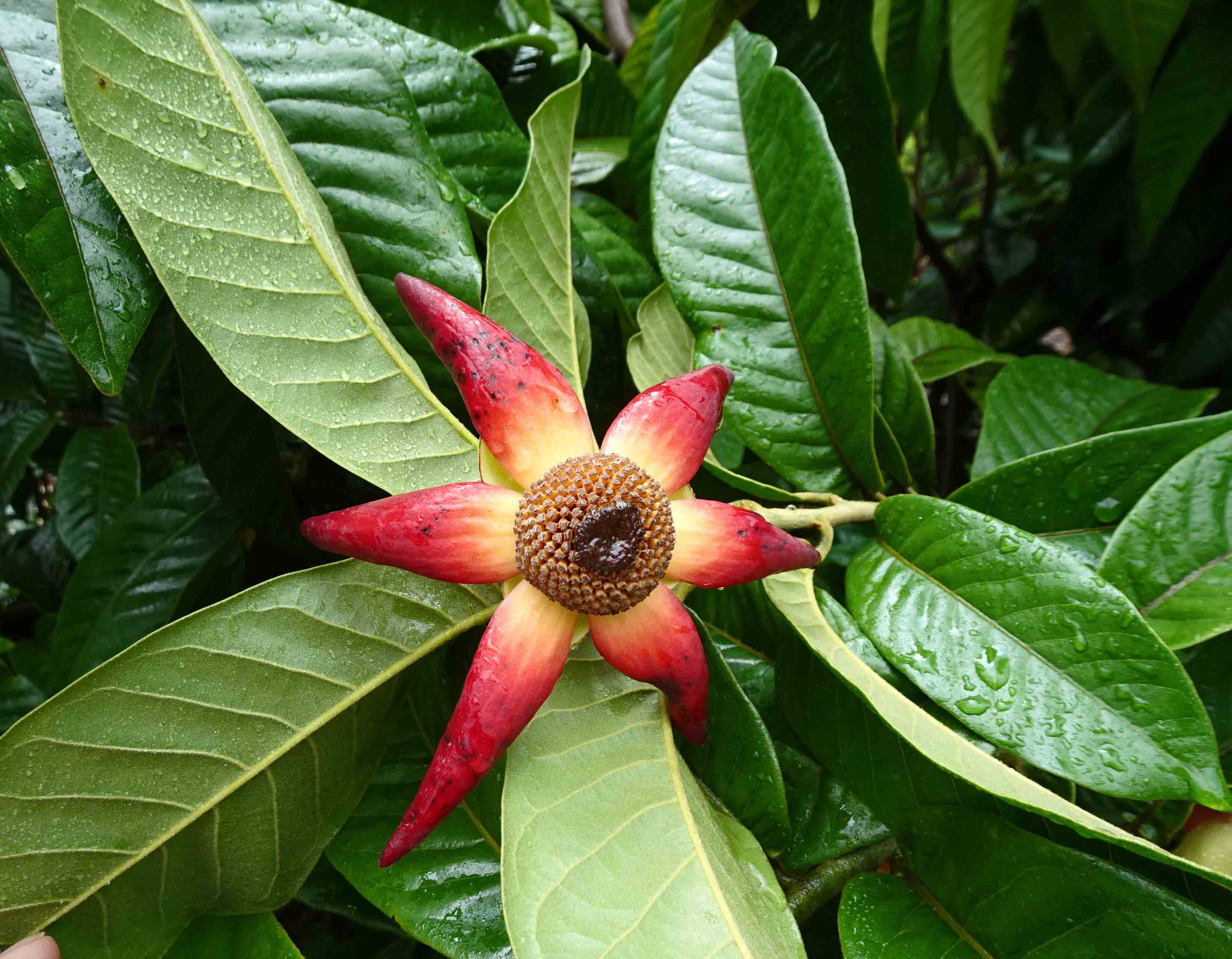
- Flower in Singapore Botanic Gardens

Scientific classification
- Kingdom: Plantae
- Clade: Tracheophytes
- Clade: Angiosperms
- Clade: Magnoliids
- Order: Magnoliales
- Family: Annonaceae
- Genus: Uvaria
- Species: U. grandiflora

Binomial name
- Uvaria grandiflora Roxb. ex Hornem.

Synonyms
- 19 synonyms: Guatteria macrantha C.Presl; Unona grandiflora Lesch. ex DC.; Uva grandiflora (Lesch. ex DC.) Kuntze; Uvaria cardinalis Elmer; Uvaria flava Teijsm. & Binn.; Uvaria grandiflora var. flava (Teijsm. & Binn.) J.Sinclair; Uvaria grandiflora var. tuberculata (King) Sinclair; Uvaria platypetala Champ. ex Benth.; Uvaria purpurea Blume; Uvaria purpurea var. alba Scheff.; Uvaria purpurea var. angustifolia Miq.; Uvaria purpurea var. flava (Teijsm. & Binn.) Scheff.; Uvaria purpurea var. glabra Burck ex Boerl.; Uvaria purpurea var. glabrescens Becc. ex Scheff.; Uvaria purpurea var. neoguineensis Diels; Uvaria purpurea var. subbiflora Miq.; Uvaria purpurea var. tuberculata King; Uvaria rhodantha Hance ex Walp.; Uvaria rubra C.B.Rob.

= Uvaria grandiflora =

Species of plant

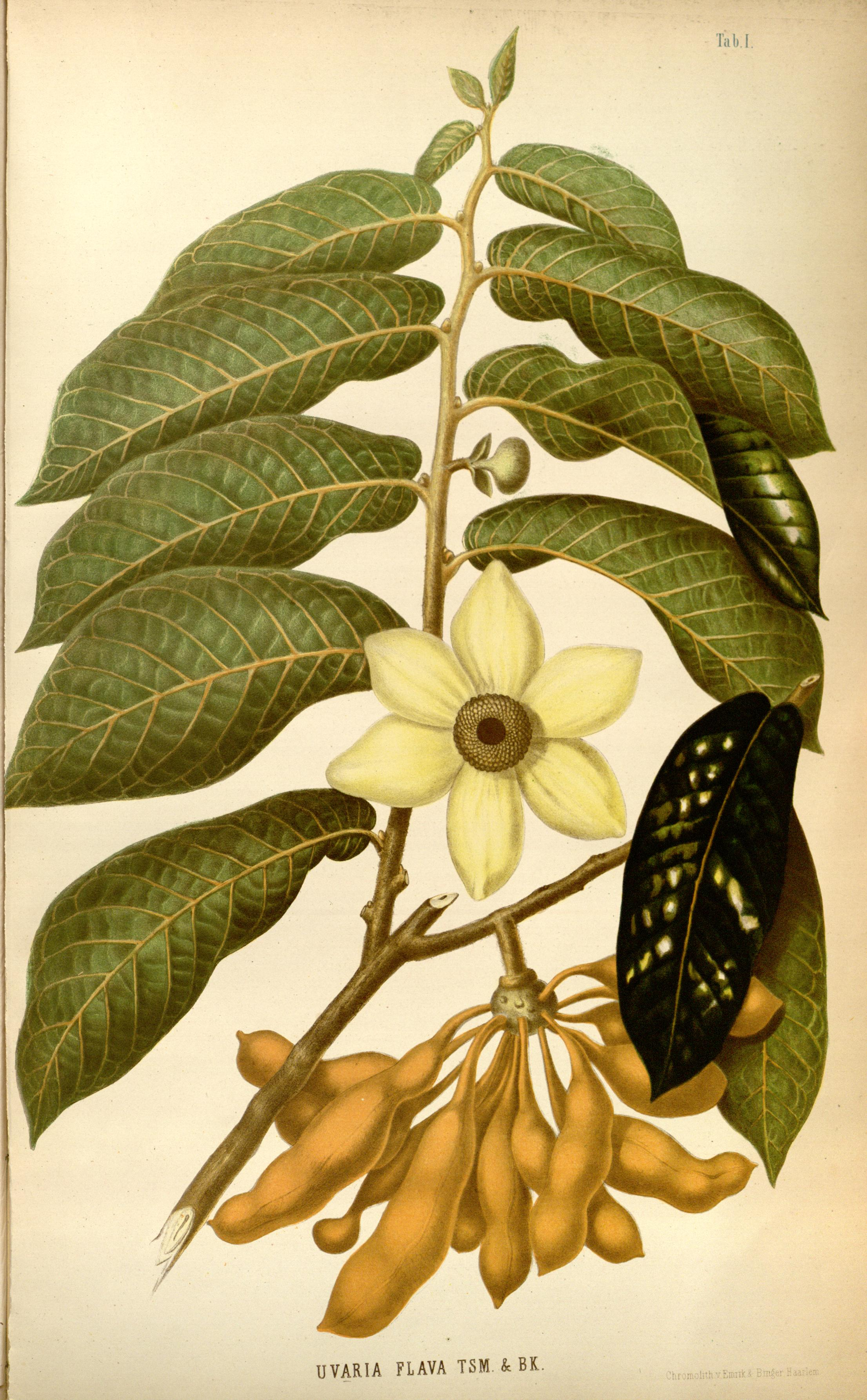
U. grandiflora in Annales Musei Botanici Lugduno-Batavi

Uvaria grandiflora is a species of plant in the family Annonaceae. Its native range includes: China, Indochina, Malesia and New Guinea.
