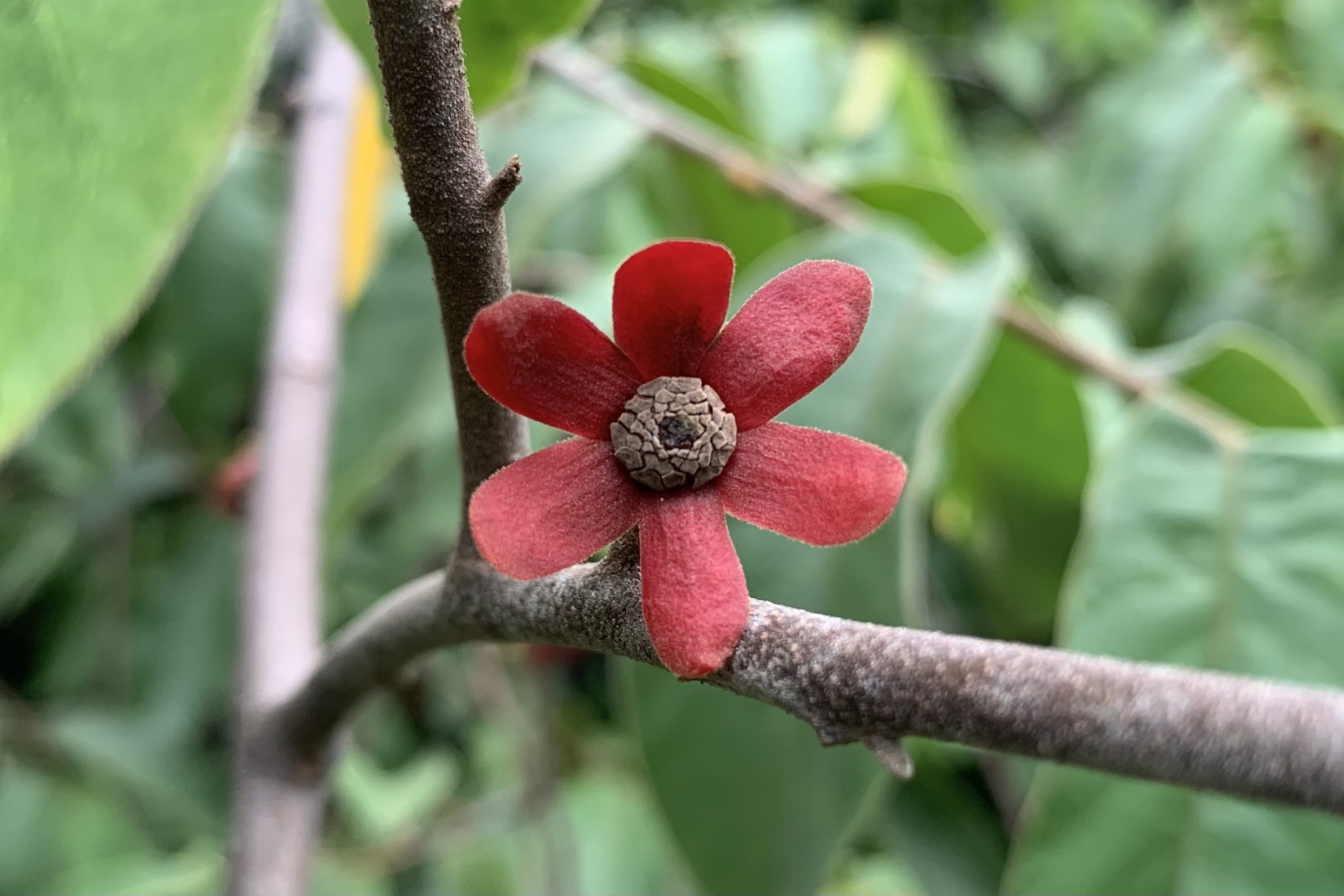
- In Thailand

Scientific classification
- Kingdom: Plantae
- Clade: Tracheophytes
- Clade: Angiosperms
- Clade: Magnoliids
- Order: Magnoliales
- Family: Annonaceae
- Genus: Uvaria
- Species: U. rufa

Binomial name
- Uvaria rufa Blume

= Uvaria rufa =

Species of shrub

Uvaria rufa is a species of vines or shrubs commonly known as susung-kalabaw ('Carabao teats') or Torres Strait scrambler, of the plant family Annonaceae. It grows naturally in Cambodia (where it is called /triəl svaː/ ទ្រៀលស្វា), Laos, Thailand, New Guinea, more widely in Malesia and in Cape York Peninsula Australia.

== Description ==
Uvaria rufa are monoecious evergreen trees that grow to a height of 4 to 6 meters. Their deep green leaves are arranged alternately and have a heart-shaped base. The surface is velvety and coarse to the touch. The flowers are small and have deep red waxy petals. The fruits, which appear from May to August, are aggregates of round or oblong berries colored deep orange or a rich red. Each contains numerous seeds encased in a translucent pulp.

== Uses ==
The fruits of Uvaria rufa are edible, having a sharp sweet-sour taste. They are known colloquially as Suso ng kalabaw or susung-kalabaw ('Carabao teats') because of its physical appearance.

The wood is also used as a Rattan substitute in making furniture and handicrafts.
