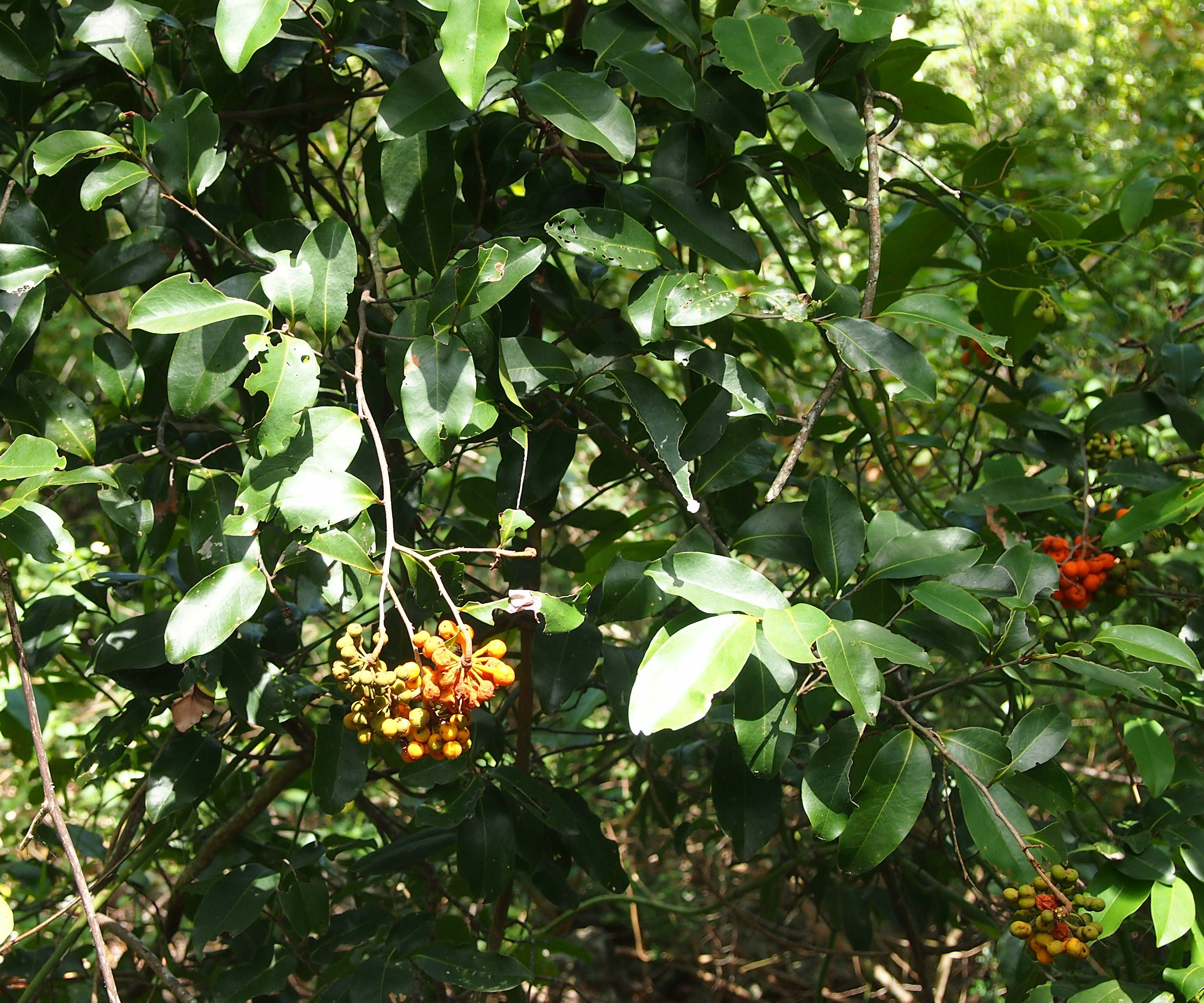

Conservation status
- Least Concern (NCA)

Scientific classification
- Kingdom: Plantae
- Clade: Tracheophytes
- Clade: Angiosperms
- Clade: Magnoliids
- Order: Magnoliales
- Family: Annonaceae
- Genus: Uvaria
- Species: U. leichhardtii

Binomial name
- Uvaria leichhardtii (F.Muell.) L.L.Zhou, Y.C.F.Su & R.M.K.Saunders

Synonyms
- Fissistigma leichhardtii (F.Muell.) Merr.; Melodorum leichhardtii (F.Muell.) Benth.; Rauwenhoffia leichhardtii (F.Muell.) Diels; Rauwenhoffia uvarioides Scheff.; Unona leichhardtii F.Muell.; Uvaria lutescens K.Schum.

= Uvaria leichhardtii =

Species of vine in the soursop family

Uvaria leichhardtii, commonly known as zig-zag vine, is a species of vine in the family Annonaceae. It is native to parts of Malesia, New Guinea, and the eastern Australian states of Queensland and New South Wales.

The orange fruit, which can be found year round on the vine, has a pleasant piquant orange-sherbet flavour, and is used for sauces in gourmet dishes.

== Gallery ==
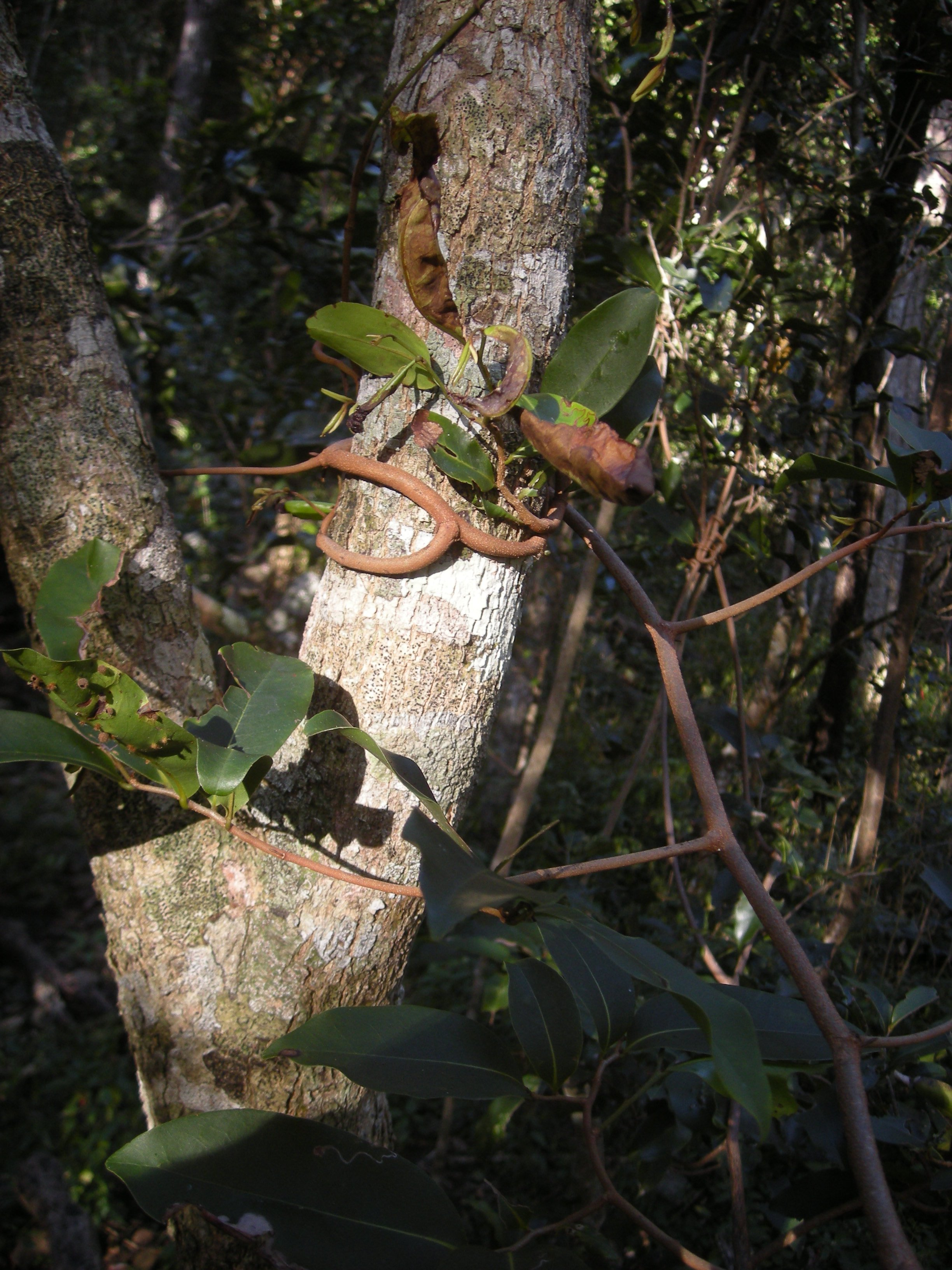
Twining around a tree trunk
