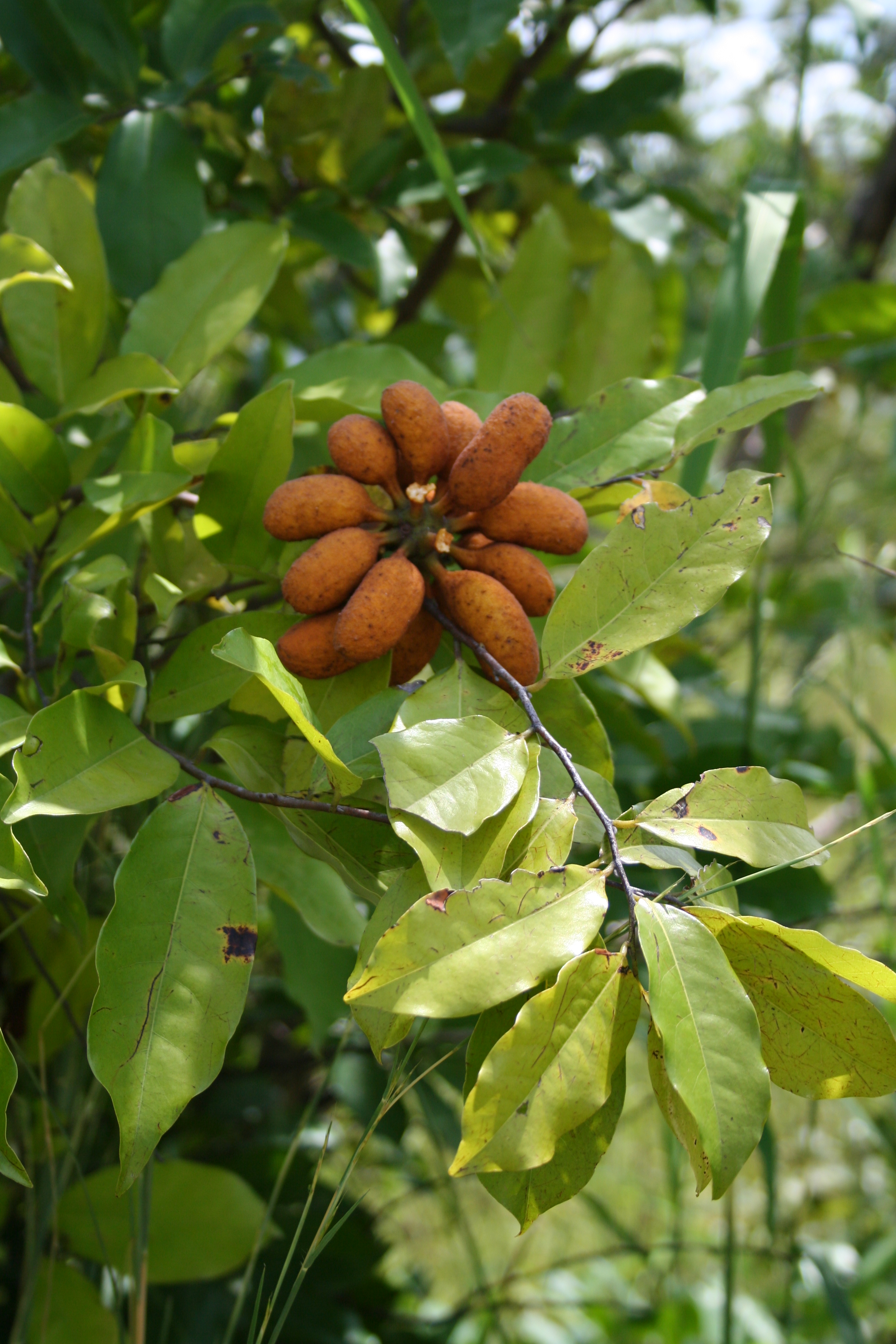
- Finger-root

Conservation status
- Least Concern (IUCN 3.1)

Scientific classification
- Kingdom: Plantae
- Clade: Embryophytes
- Clade: Tracheophytes
- Clade: Spermatophytes
- Clade: Angiosperms
- Clade: Magnoliids
- Order: Magnoliales
- Family: Annonaceae
- Genus: Uvaria
- Species: U. chamae

Binomial name
- Uvaria chamae P.Beauv.

Synonyms
- Unona macrocarpa Dunal; Uva chamae (P.Beauv.) Kuntze; Uva cristata (R.Br. ex Oliv.) Kuntze; Uva cylindrica (Schumach. & Thonn.) Kuntze; Uvaria cristata R.Br. ex Oliv.; Uvaria cylindrica Schumach. & Thonn.; Uvaria echinata A.Chev.; Uvaria macrocarpa (Dunal) Vahl; Uvaria nigrescens Engl. & Diels; Xylopiastrum macrocarpum (Dunal) Roberty

= Uvaria chamae =

Species of shrub

Uvaria chamae, commonly known as finger root or bush banana is a climbing large shrub or small tree native to tropical West and Central Africa where it grows in wet and dry forests and coastal scrublands. The common name refers to the fruit growing in its small bunches; the fruit is edible and widely eaten. U. chamae is a medicinal plant used throughout its range to treat fevers and has antibiotic properties. An extract of Uvaria chamae, administered orally at 300–900 mg/kg/day showed significant antimalarial activity against both early and established infections.
