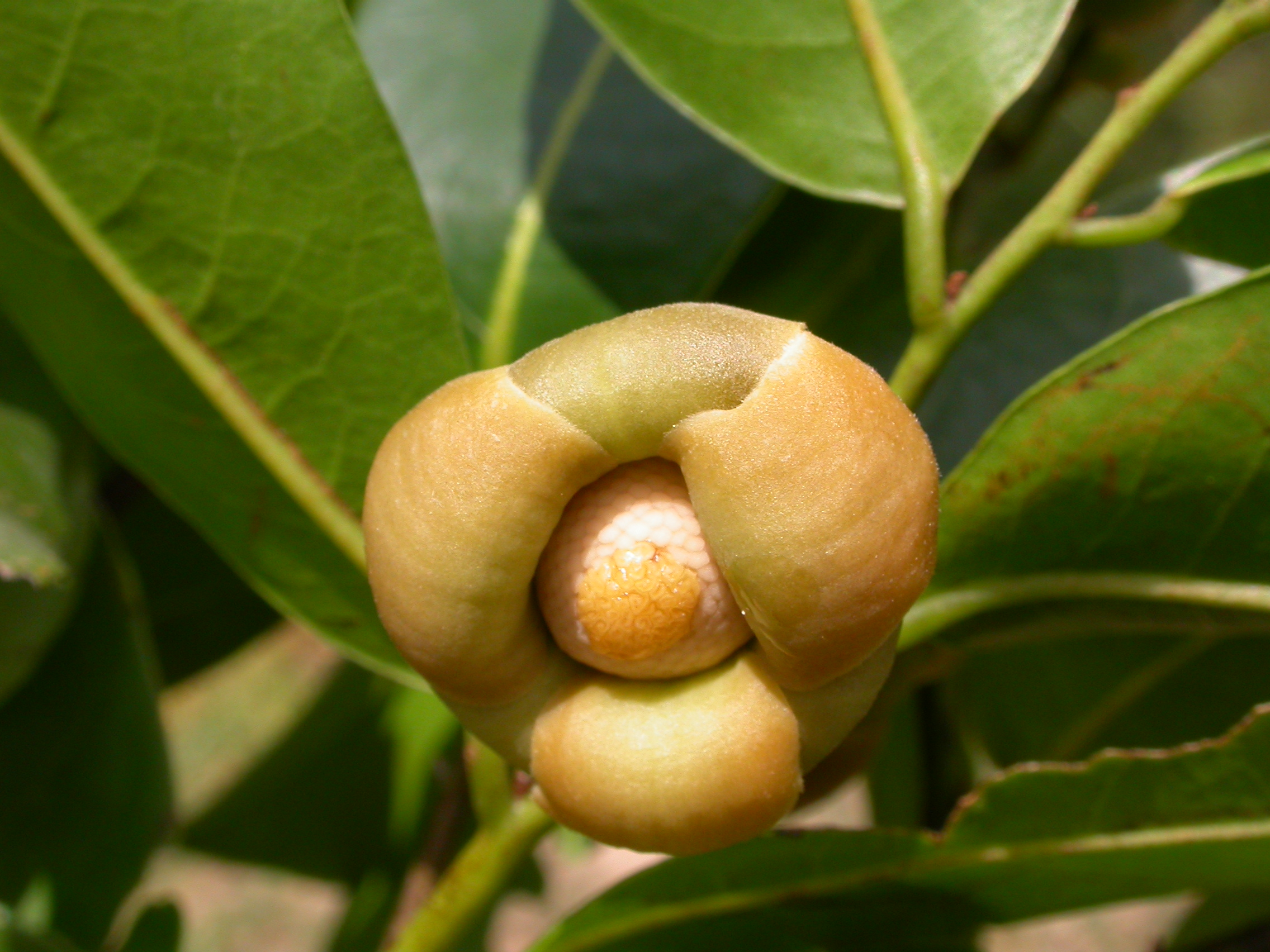
- U. chamae

Scientific classification
- Kingdom: Plantae
- Clade: Tracheophytes
- Clade: Angiosperms
- Clade: Magnoliids
- Order: Magnoliales
- Family: Annonaceae
- Tribe: Uvarieae
- Genus: Uvaria; L.

Type species
- Uvaria zeylanica L.

Species
- 171 – see List of Uvaria species

Synonyms
- Anomianthus Zoll.; Balonga Le Thomas; Cyathostemma Griff.; Dasoclema J.Sinclair; Ellipeia Hook.f. & Thomson; Ellipeiopsis R.E.Fr.; Marenteria Thouars; Melodorum Lour.; Narum Adans.; Pyragma Noronha; Rauwenhoffia Scheff.; Tetrapetalum Miq.; Uvariella Ridl.; Xylopiastrum Roberty

= Uvaria =

Genus of plants in the soursop family

Uvaria is a genus of flowering plants in the family Annonaceae. The generic name Uvaria is derived from the Latin uva, 'grape', because the fruit of some species in the genus resemble grapes. Species are distributed throughout the Old World tropics.

== Description ==
Species in this genus are lianas or climbing shrubs. They are woody and without hooks or spines, but almost all parts have stellate (star-shaped) hairs. Other shared features include bisexual flowers (i.e. having functional male and female parts in each flower), sepals connected edge to edge (valvate), petals overlapping (imbricate) and arranged in two whorls, pollen grains solitary, and apocarpous fruit.

== Taxonomy ==
The genus Uvaria was erected by Carl Linnaeus in 1753 to accommodate two new species – U. zeylanica (the type species) and U. japonica (now Kadsura japonica). By 2009, the genus contained about 150–190 species and was considered to be paraphyletic. In that year, Zhou et al published a study that used molecular analysis, and as a result they transferred a total of 15 species from the closely related genera Anomianthus, Cyathostemma, Ellipeia, Ellipeiopsis and Rauwenhoffia. As of April 2025, 171 species are accepted by Plants of the World Online.

== Distribution ==
Species are present in tropical and southern Africa, including Madagascar; also the Indian subcontinent, mainland Southeast Asia, southern China, Malesia, New Guinea, and the states of Western Australia, the Northern Territory, Queensland and New South Wales in Australia.

== Selected species ==
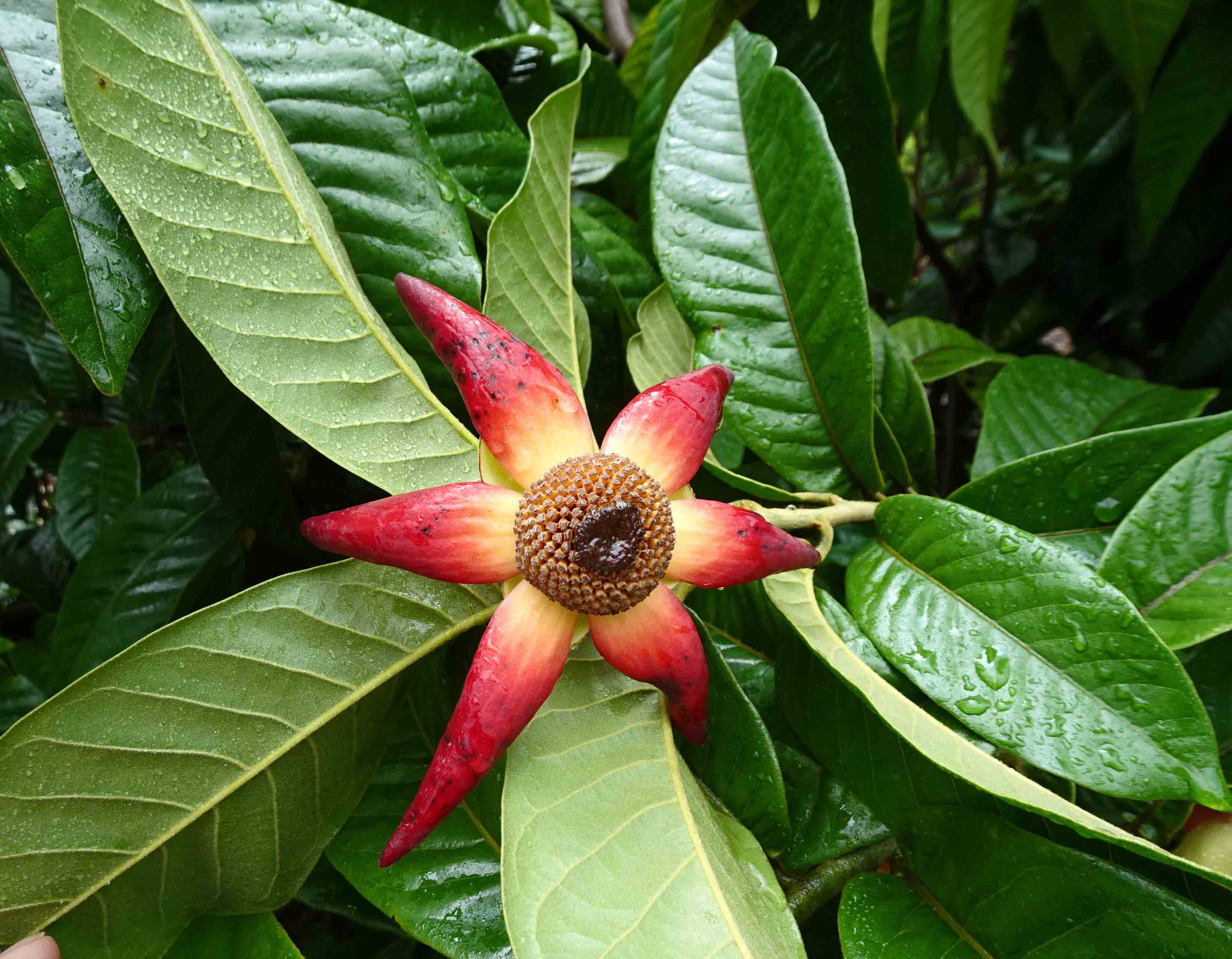
Uvaria grandiflora in Singapore

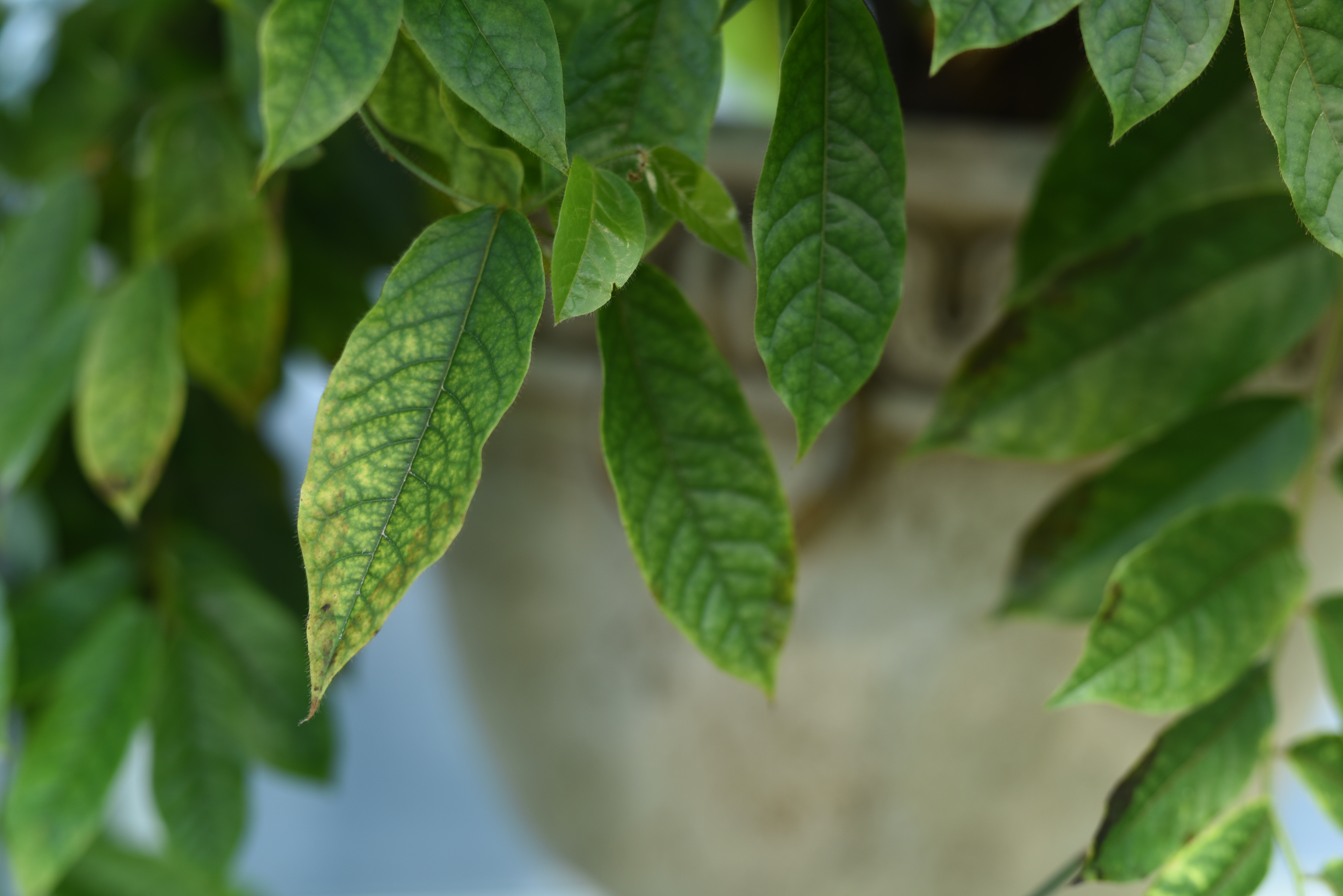
Uvaria ovata, native to West Africa

There are 171 accepted Uvaria species as of April 2025, according to Plants of the World Online.

- Uvaria chamae P.Beauv. – Finger-root, China
- Uvaria dulcis Dunal - Tropical Asia (E. Indonesia, Jawa, Mainland Southeast Asia)
- Uvaria grandiflora Roxb. ex Hornem. - Indochina and Malesia
- Uvaria leichhardtii (F.Muell.) L.L.Zhou, Y.C.F.Su & R.M.K.Saunders – New Guinea and northern and eastern Australia
- Uvaria macclurei Diels – southern China
- Uvaria narum (Dunal) Wall. - Indian subcontinent
- Uvaria rufa (Dunal) Blume; Susung-kalabaw, Australia to Philippines & Indochina
- Uvaria siamensis (Scheff.) L.L.Zhou, Y.C.F.Su & R.M.K.Saunders – Indochina and Peninsular Malaysia

=== Formerly placed here ===
- Kadsura japonica (L.) Dunal (as U. japonica L.)
- Cananga odorata (Lam.) Hook.f. & Thomson (as U. odorata Lam.)
- Oxandra lanceolata (Sw.) Baill. (as U. lanceolata Sw.)
- Huberantha cerasoides (Roxb.) Bedd. (as U. cerasoides Roxb.)
- Monoon longifolium (Sonn.) Thwaites (as U. longifolia Sonn.)
- Xylopia aromatica (Lam.) Mart. (as U. aromatica Lam.)
