= Uvaria siamensis =

Conservation status
- Least Concern (IUCN 3.1)

Scientific classification
- Kingdom: Plantae
- Clade: Embryophytes
- Clade: Tracheophytes
- Clade: Spermatophytes
- Clade: Angiosperms
- Clade: Magnoliids
- Order: Magnoliales
- Family: Annonaceae
- Genus: Uvaria
- Species: U. siamensis

Binomial name
- Uvaria siamensis (Scheff.) L.L.Zhou, Y.C.F.Su & R.M.K.Saunders (2009)

Synonyms
- Fissistigma schefferi (Pierre ex Finet & Gagnep.) Merr. (1919); Melodorum fruticosum Lour. (1790); Melodorum schefferi Pierre ex Finet & Gagnep. (1906); Melodorum siamense (Scheff.) Bân (1974); Rauwenhoffia siamensis Scheff. (1885 publ. 1881); Unona dumetorum Dunal (1817), nom. superfl.; Uvaria godefroyana Finet & Gagnep. (1906); Uvaria godefroyana var. nervosa Finet & Gagnep. (1907)

Species of flowering plant

Uvaria siamensis, locally called nom-maew (Thai: นมแมว), is a plant in the family Annonaceae. Uvaria siamensis is a shrub or liana native to Myanmar, Laos, Thailand, Cambodia, Vietnam, and northern Peninsular Malaysia.

It is related to the ylang-ylang. It requires little care and can even be kept in containers, blooming from spring until fall. Despite their plainness, the flowers of the genus Uvaria have a aroma that can travel very far. It is for this that Asian gardeners include it among their favorite garden plants. This plant can tolerate some shade; however, lack of sunlight adversely affects flowering.

== Description ==
Uvaria siamensis a perennial plant with a small trunk, and a height of 1–2 meters, darkly-coloured stalks and drooping branches. Their leaves are especially monocotyledonous, long, and sharp. A single one can bloom as group of 1–3 flowers, which are yellow-green in color, 1–2 cm large, very fragrant, and have 6 petals. The flowers bloom throughout the year.

== Cultivation ==
This tree is a good container plant. It is relatively problem-free and requires little care. Even though the flowers are inconspicuous, a single flower has a quite strong and pleasant aroma, thus the plant has a high value and is often used in Asian gardens.

== Properties ==
It is an essential ingredient in an Indonesian herbal concoction which includes, besides nom-maew, ginseng root and powdered corn. It has a pleasant taste and aroma, and claims to have a variety of benefits including: improving muscle one, expands circulation, reduces blood pressure, restores a regular heart rhythm, increases red blood cell count, reduces pain and fatigue, cleanses the body of toxic substances and stimulates intellectual activity.
