= List of Uvaria species =

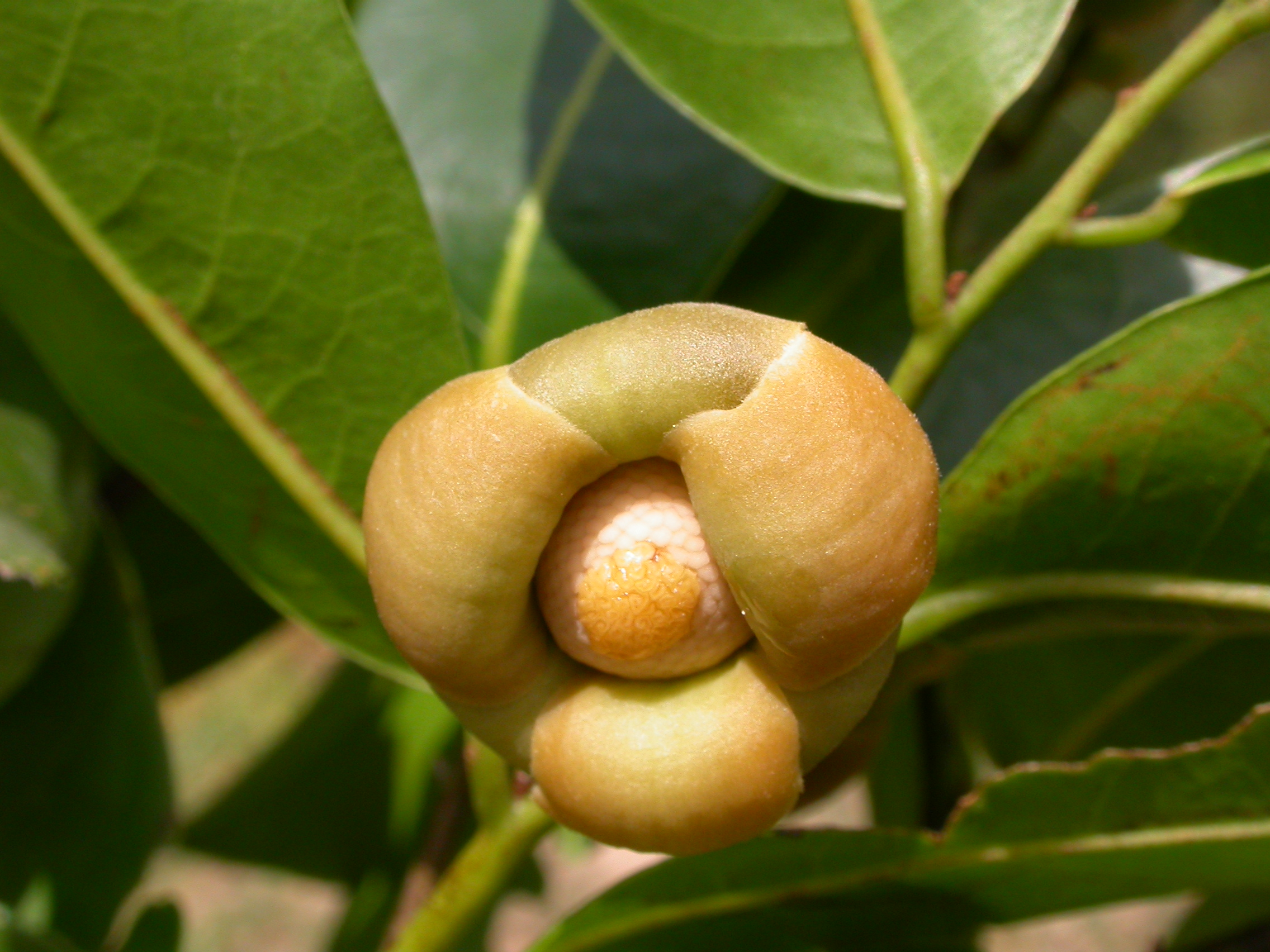
Uvaria chamae

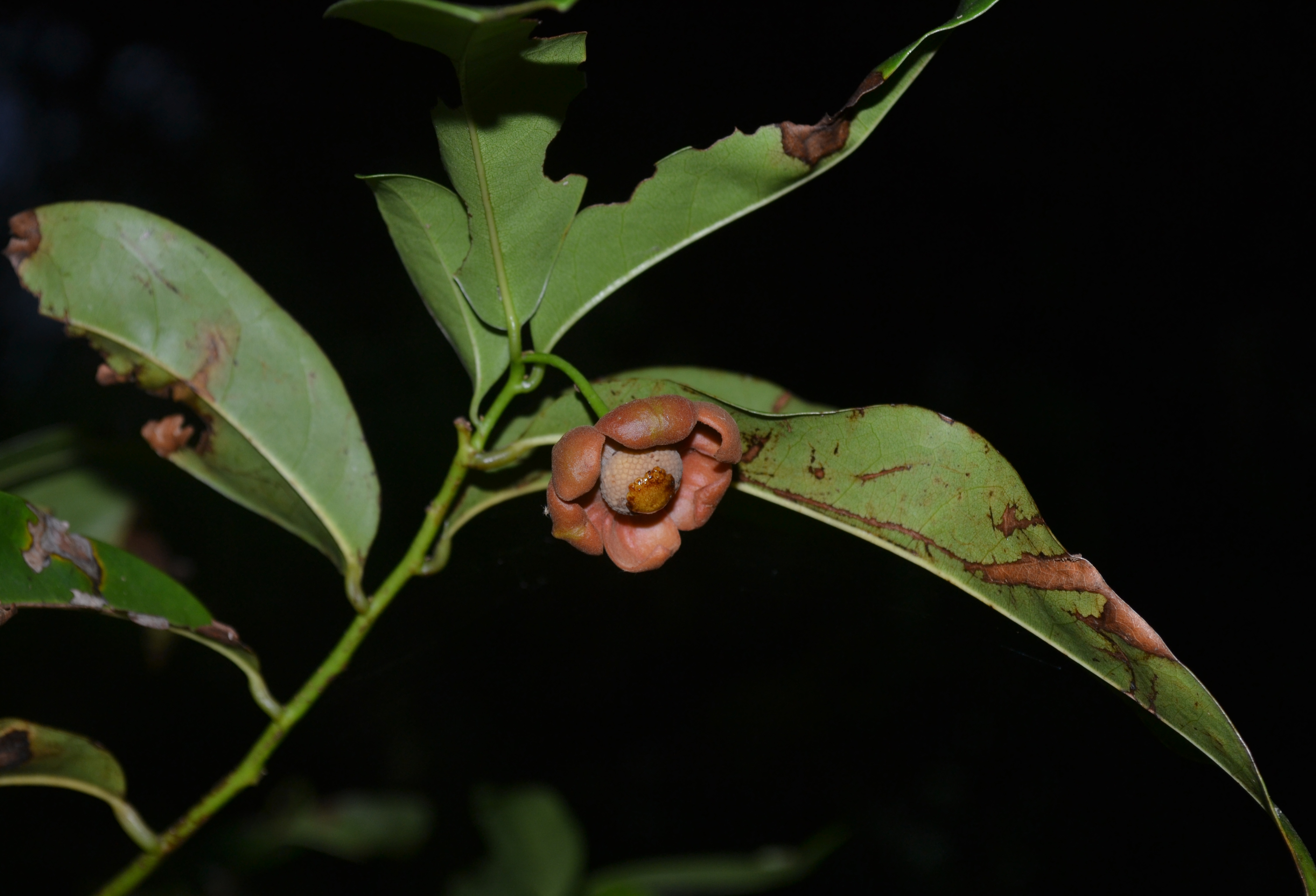
Uvaria narum

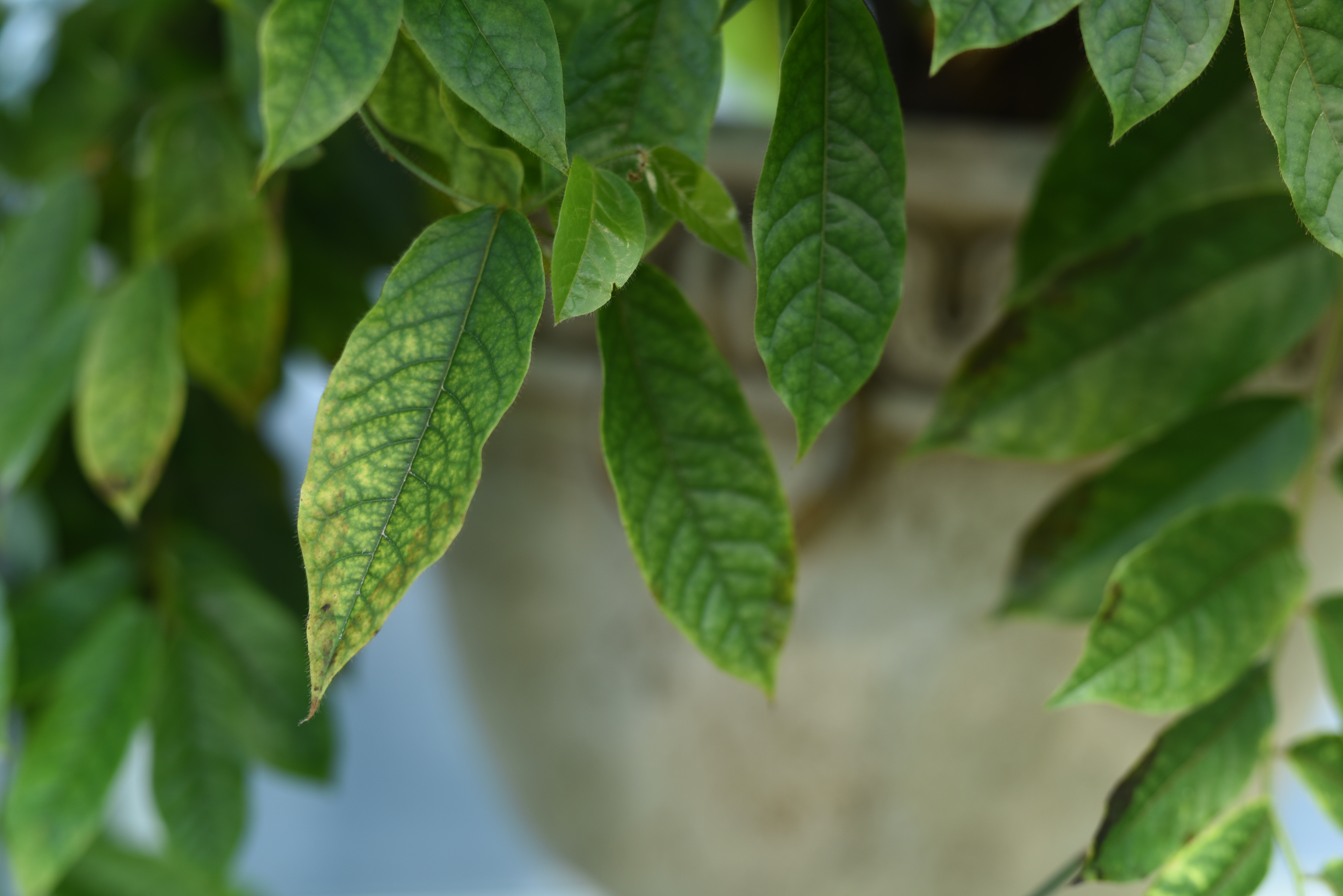
Uvaria ovata

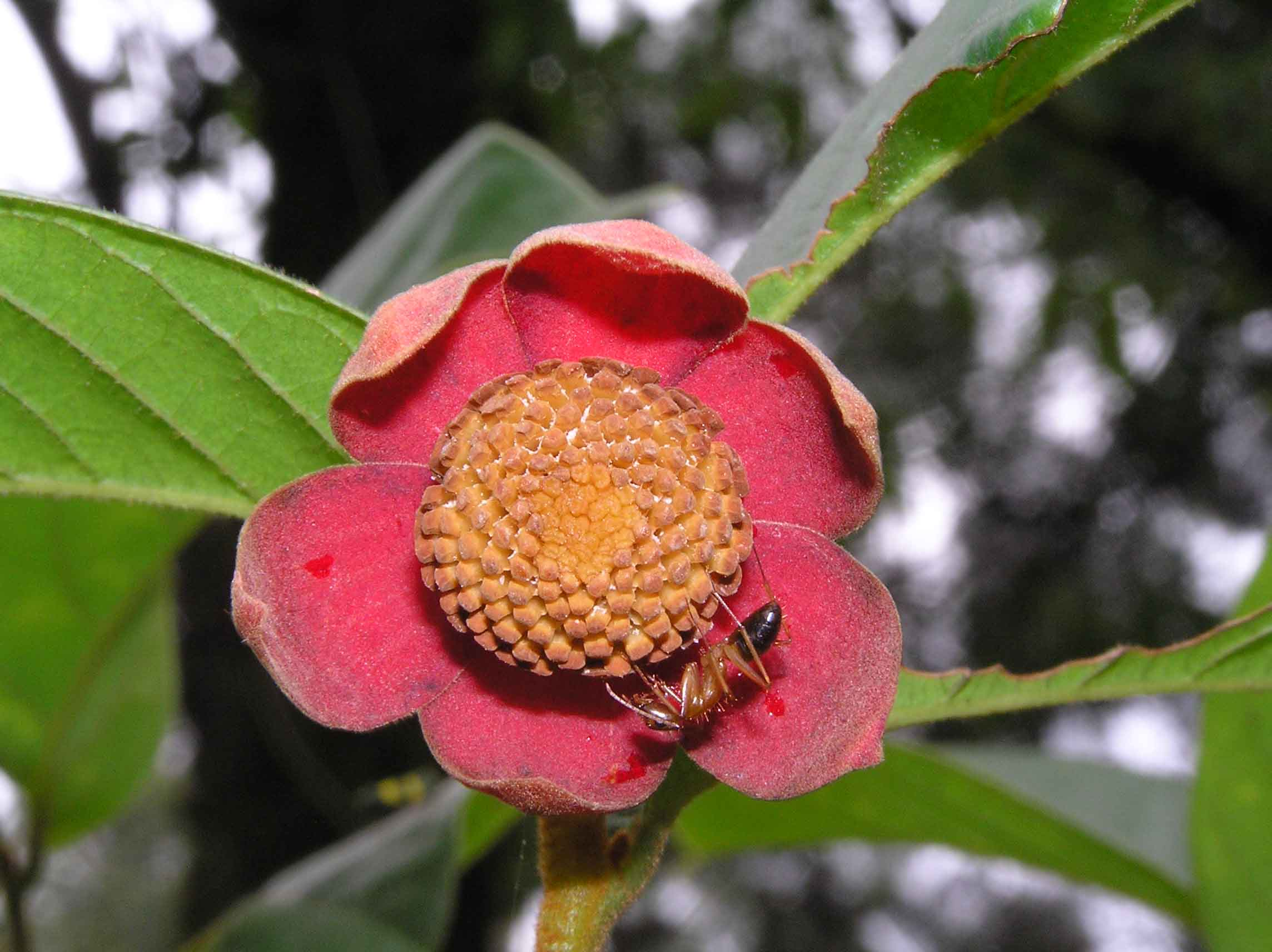
Uvaria littoralis at Sai Kung, Hong Kong

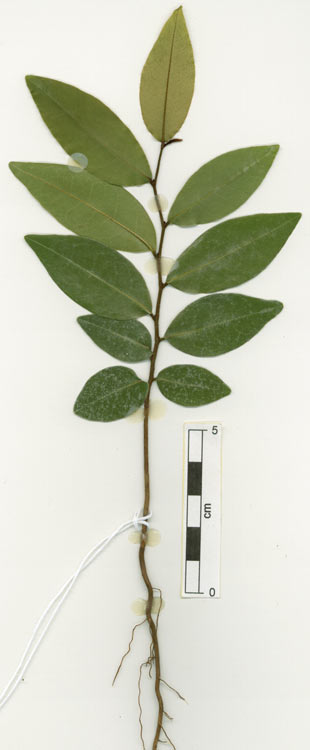
Uvaria sankowskyi

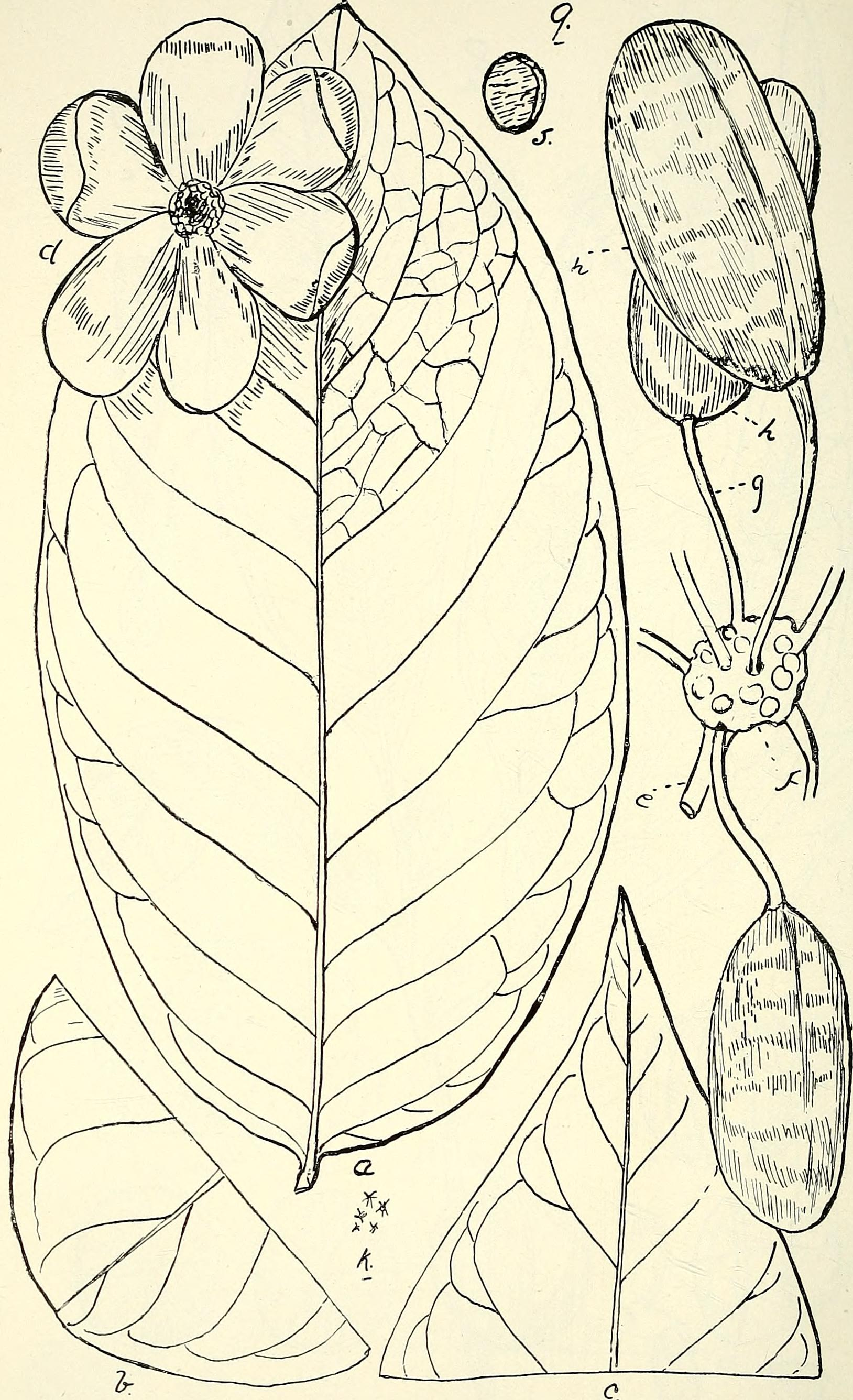
Uvaria

This is a list of Uvaria species, trees in the Annonaceae family, there are 168 accepted as of April 2021:

- Uvaria acuminata Oliv.
- Uvaria afzelii Scott Elliot
- Uvaria alba Merr.
- Uvaria albertisii Diels
- Uvaria ambongoensis (Baill.) Diels
- Uvaria amplexicaulis Diels
- Uvaria angolensis Welw. ex Oliv.
- Uvaria annickiae Jongkind
- Uvaria annonoides Baker f.
- Uvaria antsiranensis Le Thomas
- Uvaria argentea Blume
- Uvaria bathiei Ghesq. ex Cavaco & Keraudren
- Uvaria baumannii Engl. & Diels
- Uvaria beccarii Attan., I.M.Turner & R.M.K.Saunders
- Uvaria bipindensis Engl.
- Uvaria blumei (Boerl.) I.M.Turner
- Uvaria boniana Finet & Gagnep.
- Uvaria borneensis (Merr.) Utteridge
- Uvaria botryoides Paiva
- Uvaria brevistipitata De Wild.
- Uvaria buchholzii Engl. & Diels
- Uvaria busgenii A.Unwin
- Uvaria cabindensis Exell
- Uvaria cabrae De Wild.
- Uvaria caffra E.Mey. ex Sond.
- Uvaria calamistrata Hance
- Uvaria callicarpa Baill.
- Uvaria capuronii Keraudren
- Uvaria caroli-afzelii R.E.Fr.
- Uvaria chamae P.Beauv.
- Uvaria cinerascens (Miq.) L.L.Zhou, Y.C.F.Su & R.M.K.Saunders
- Uvaria clavata Pierre ex Engl. & Diels
- Uvaria clementis (Merr.) Attan., I.M.Turner & R.M.K.Saunders
- Uvaria combretifolia Diels
- Uvaria commersoniana Baill.
- Uvaria comperei Le Thomas
- Uvaria concava Teijsm. & Binn.
- Uvaria cornuana Engl. & Diels
- Uvaria cuanzensis Paiva
- Uvaria cuneifolia (Hook.f. & Thomson) L.L.Zhou, Y.C.F.Su & R.M.K.Saunders
- Uvaria curtisii King
- Uvaria curvistipitata Attan., I.M.Turner & R.M.K.Saunders
- Uvaria dac Pierre ex Finet & Gagnep.
- Uvaria dacremontii Boutique
- Uvaria dasoclema L.L.Zhou, Y.C.F.Su & R.M.K.Saunders
- Uvaria dasychlamys Miq.
- Uvaria decaryana Cavaco & Keraudren
- Uvaria decidua Diels
- Uvaria denhardtiana Engl. & Diels
- Uvaria dependens Engl. & Diels
- Uvaria dinklagei Engl. & Diels
- Uvaria diplocampta Diels
- Uvaria doeringii Diels
- Uvaria dulcis Dunal
- Uvaria edulis N.Robson
- Uvaria elliptifolia Merr.
- Uvaria excelsa (Hook.f. & Thomson) King
- Uvaria farquharii Hutch. & Dalziel
- Uvaria faulknerae Verdc.
- Uvaria ferruginea Buch.-Ham. ex Hook.f. & Thomson
- Uvaria flexuosa Jovet-Ast
- Uvaria forbesii (Baker f.) L.L.Zhou, Y.C.F.Su & R.M.K.Saunders
- Uvaria furfuracea (A.DC.) Walp.
- Uvaria gabonensis Engl. & Diels
- Uvaria glabra Span.
- Uvaria glabrata Engl. & Diels
- Uvaria goloensis Merr.
- Uvaria gracilipes N.Robson
- Uvaria grandiflora Roxb. ex Hornem.
- Uvaria griffithii L.L.Zhou, Y.C.F.Su & R.M.K.Saunders
- Uvaria hahnii (Finet & Gagnep.) J.Sinclair
- Uvaria hamata Dunal
- Uvaria hamiltonii Hook.f. & Thomson
- Uvaria heterotricha Pellegr.
- Uvaria hirsuta Jack
- Uvaria hispidocostata Pierre ex Engl. & Diels
- Uvaria humbertii Ghesq. ex Cavaco & Keraudren
- Uvaria johannis Exell
- Uvaria kirkii Oliv. ex Hook.f.
- Uvaria klaineana Engl. & Diels
- Uvaria klainei Pierre ex Engl. & Diels
- Uvaria kurzii (King) P.T.Li
- Uvaria lamponga Scheff.
- Uvaria lancifolia Merr.
- Uvaria lanuginosa Ridl.
- Uvaria larep Miq.
- Uvaria lastoursvillensis Pellegr.
- Uvaria laurentii De Wild.
- Uvaria leandrii Ghesq. ex Cavaco & Keraudren
- Uvaria leichhardtii (F.Muell.) L.L.Zhou, Y.C.F.Su & R.M.K.Saunders
- Uvaria lemurica Diels
- Uvaria leopoldvillensis De Wild.
- Uvaria leptocladon Oliv.
- Uvaria leptopoda (King) J.Sinclair
- Uvaria littoralis (Blume) Blume
- Uvaria lobbiana Hook.f. & Thomson
- Uvaria lombardii L.Gaut. & Deroin
- Uvaria lucida Bojer ex Benth.
- Uvaria lungonyana Vollesen
- Uvaria macclurei Diels
- Uvaria macgregorii Merr.
- Uvaria macrantha Hassk.
- Uvaria macropoda Hook.f. & Thomson
- Uvaria manjensis Cavaco & Keraudren
- Uvaria marenteria (DC.) Baill.
- Uvaria mendesii Paiva
- Uvaria micrantha (A.DC.) Hook.f. & Thomson
- Uvaria microcarpa Champ. ex Benth.
- Uvaria mocoli De Wild. & T.Durand
- Uvaria modesta (Diels) Couvreur
- Uvaria mollis Engl. & Diels
- Uvaria monticola Miq.
- Uvaria muricata Pierre ex Engl. & Diels
- Uvaria musaria (Dunal) A.DC. ex Merr.
- Uvaria narum (Dunal) Blume
- Uvaria neoguineensis Engl.
- Uvaria ngounyensis Pellegr.
- Uvaria nicobarica Raizada & K.C.Sahni
- Uvaria obanensis Baker f.
- Uvaria oligocarpa (Diels) L.L.Zhou, Y.C.F.Su & R.M.K.Saunders
- Uvaria osmantha Diels
- Uvaria ovata (Vahl ex DC.) Hook.f. & Benth.
- Uvaria paivana Couvreur
- Uvaria panayensis Merr.
- Uvaria pandensis Verdc.
- Uvaria papuasica (Diels) L.L.Zhou, Y.C.F.Su & R.M.K.Saunders
- Uvaria pauciovulata Hook.f. & Thomson
- Uvaria pierrei Finet & Gagnep.
- Uvaria poggei Engl. & Diels
- Uvaria psorosperma Pierre ex Engl. & Diels
- Uvaria puguensis D.M.Johnson
- Uvaria pulchra Louis ex Boutique
- Uvaria relambo Deroin & L.Gaut.
- Uvaria rivularis Louis ex Boutique
- Uvaria rovumae Deroin & Lötter
- Uvaria rufa (Dunal) Blume
- Uvaria rupestris (Jessup) L.L.Zhou, Y.C.F.Su & R.M.K.Saunders
- Uvaria saboureaui Cavaco & Keraudren
- Uvaria sambiranensis Deroin & L.Gaut.
- Uvaria sankowskyi L.L.Zhou, Y.C.F.Su & R.M.K.Saunders
- Uvaria sassandrensis Jongkind
- Uvaria scabrida Oliv.
- Uvaria scabridula (Jessup) L.L.Zhou, Y.C.F.Su & R.M.K.Saunders
- Uvaria schefferi L.L.Zhou, Y.C.F.Su & R.M.K.Saunders
- Uvaria scheffleri Diels
- Uvaria schizocalyx Backer
- Uvaria schweinfurthii Engl. & Diels
- Uvaria semecarpifolia Hook.f. & Thomson
- Uvaria siamensis (Scheff.) L.L.Zhou, Y.C.F.Su & R.M.K.Saunders
- Uvaria smithii Engl.
- Uvaria sofa Scott Elliot
- Uvaria sphenocarpa Hook.f. & Thomson
- Uvaria tanzaniae Verdc.
- Uvaria thomasii Sprague & Hutch.
- Uvaria timoriensis Blume
- Uvaria tonkinensis Finet & Gagnep.
- Uvaria topazensis (Jessup) L.L.Zhou, Y.C.F.Su & R.M.K.Saunders
- Uvaria tortilis A.Chev. ex Hutch. & Dalziel
- Uvaria uhrii (F.Muell.) L.L.Zhou, Y.C.F.Su & R.M.K.Saunders
- Uvaria unguiculata (Jessup) L.L.Zhou, Y.C.F.Su & R.M.K.Saunders
- Uvaria utteridgei L.L.Zhou, Y.C.F.Su & R.M.K.Saunders
- Uvaria valderramensis Cabuang, Exconde & Alejandro
- Uvaria verrucosa Scheff.
- Uvaria versicolor Pierre ex Engl. & Diels
- Uvaria vietnamensis Meade
- Uvaria welwitschii (Hiern) Engl. & Diels
- Uvaria wrayi (King) L.L.Zhou, Y.C.F.Su & R.M.K.Saunders
- Uvaria zeylanica L.
- Uvaria zschokkei Elmer
