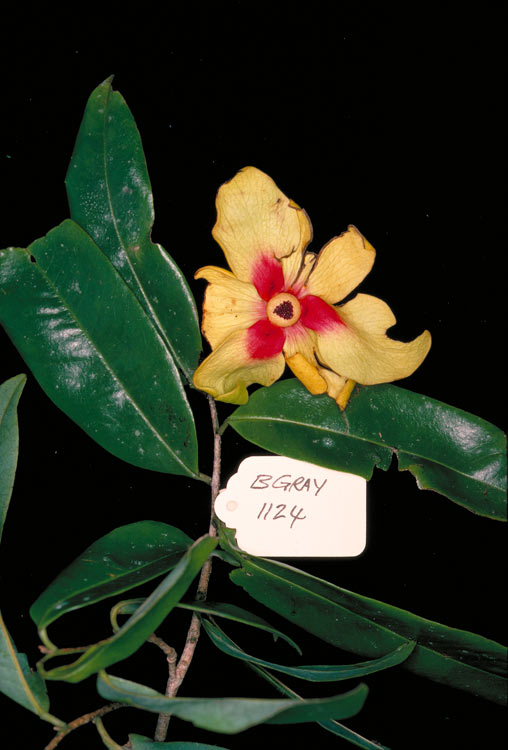
- Flower

Conservation status
- Least Concern (NCA)

Scientific classification
- Kingdom: Plantae
- Clade: Tracheophytes
- Clade: Angiosperms
- Clade: Magnoliids
- Order: Magnoliales
- Family: Annonaceae
- Genus: Desmos
- Species: D. goezeanus

Binomial name
- Desmos goezeanus (F.Muell.) Jessup
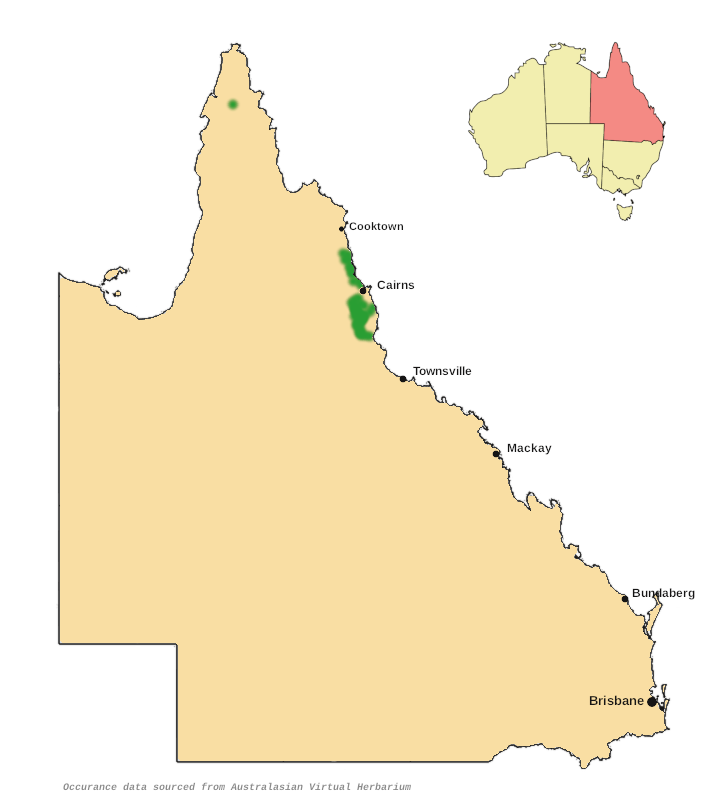

Synonyms
- Homotypic: Uva goezeana (F.Muell.) Kuntze; Uvaria goezeana F.Muell.; Heterotypic: Unona queenslandica Domin

= Desmos goezeanus =

Species of flowering plant

Desmos goezeanus is a species of rainforest plant in the family Annonaceae found almost entirely within the Wet Tropics bioregion of Queensland, Australia. It is a treetop vine and was first described in 1871. It has the conservation status of 'least concern'.

== Description ==
Desmos goezeanus is a tendril climber with a stem diameter of up to 5 cm (2.0 in), capable of reaching the top of the canopy. The leaves are glossy green above and chalky blue-green (glaucous) below, and they measure up to 16 cm (6.3 in) long and 5 cm (2.0 in) wide. They are attached to the twigs on a petiole (leaf stalk) about 5 mm (0.20 in) long, and have about 20 lateral veins either side of the midrib.

The flowers are about 3.5 cm (1.4 in) diameter and have six petals in two whorls of three, the outer petals slightly larger than the inner ones. The petals are yellow and tinged with red at the base. There are up to 40 free (i.e. not fused together) carpels per flower, each with about six ovules. The fruit is a cluster of thin segmented structures, each the product of one carpel and measuring about 8 cm (3.1 in) long. These structures have between three and eight bead-like segments, each of which contains a single seed. When ripe, the fruit change from yellow to red.

=== Phenology ===
This species flowers in the Australian spring, from September to November. The fruit are available between April and June. The seeds take about 110 days to germinate.

== Distribution and habitat ==
It grows in well developed rainforest on a variety of soils, at altitudes from sea level up to about 1,000 m (3,300 ft). It is mostly confined to the northeast coast of Queensland from about Cape Tribulation south towards Cardwell, although there are two very disjunct records of collections – one in northern Cape York Peninsula more than 500 km (310 mi) from the nearest collection, and another even further away in the Top End region of the Northern Territory.

== Taxonomy ==
This plant was first described in 1871 as Uvaria goezeana by Ferdinand von Mueller. It remained unchanged until it was moved to the genus Desmos by Laurence W. Jessup in 1986.

== Conservation ==
Desmos goezeanus is listed as least concern under the Queensland Government's Nature Conservation Act. As of 10 January 2025, it has not been assessed by the International Union for Conservation of Nature (IUCN).

== Ecology ==
This species is a host plant for the larvae of the fourbar swordtail and the pale green triangle butterflies.

== Gallery ==
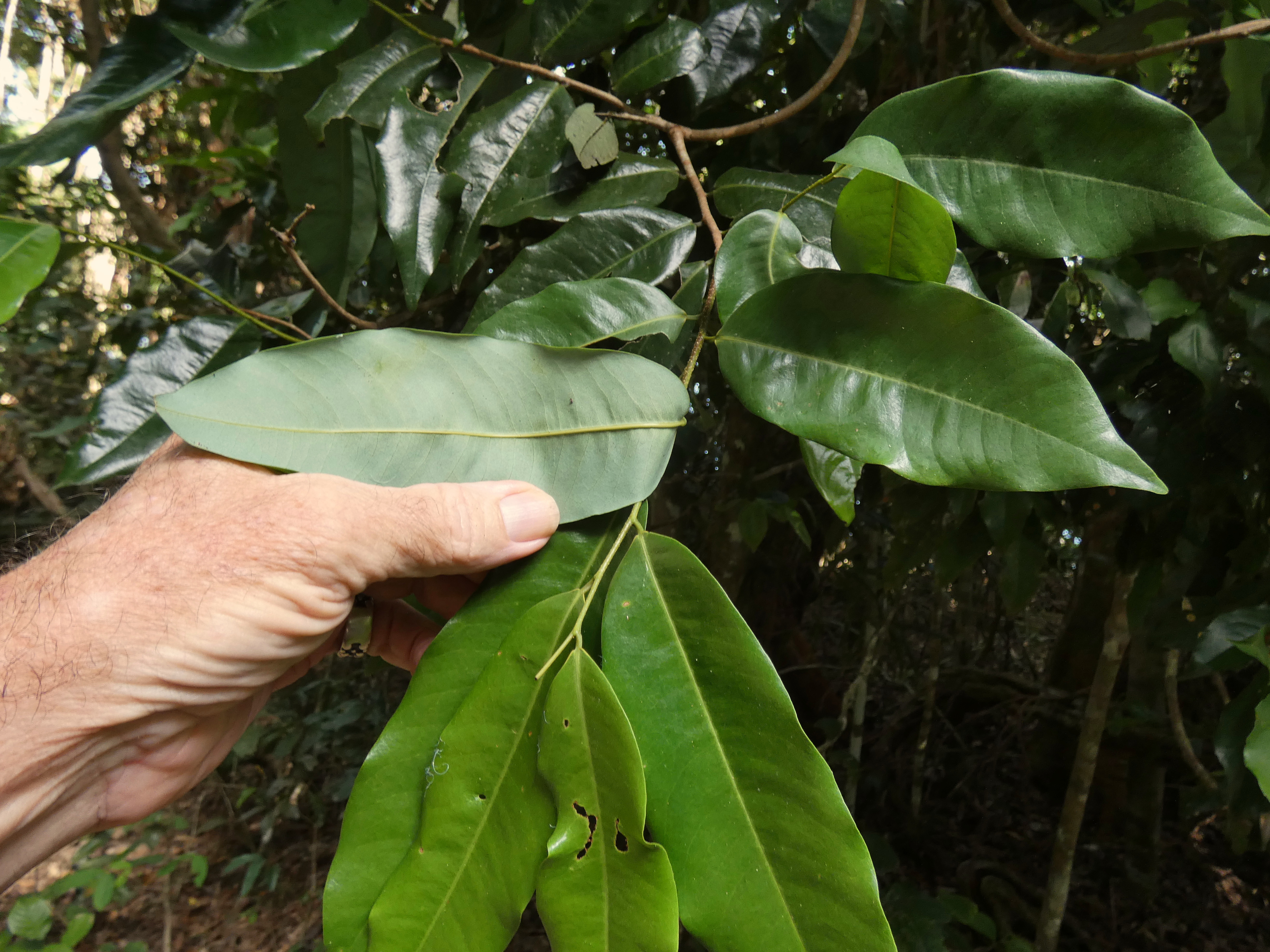
Foliage

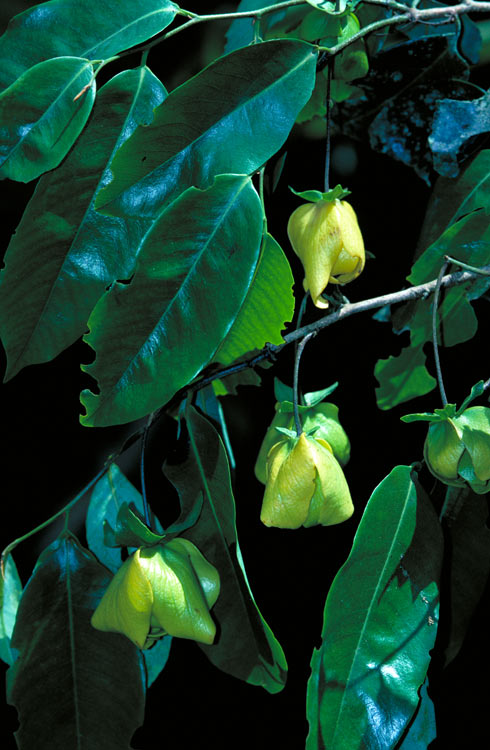
Flowers

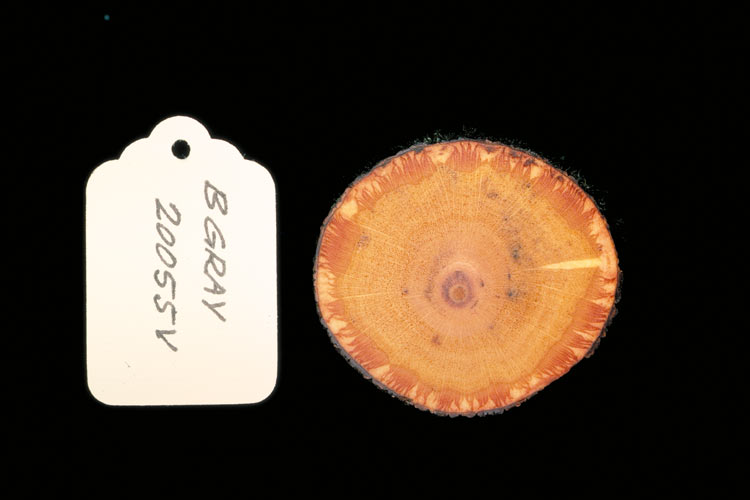
Cross-section of vine stem
