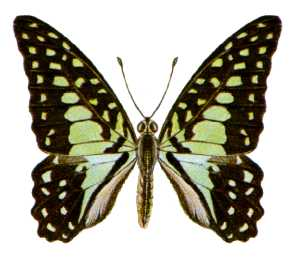

Scientific classification
- Kingdom: Animalia
- Phylum: Arthropoda
- Clade: Pancrustacea
- Class: Insecta
- Order: Lepidoptera
- Family: Papilionidae
- Genus: Graphium
- Species: G. macfarlanei

Binomial name
- Graphium macfarlanei (Butler, 1877)

Synonyms
- Papilio macfarlanei Butler, 1877; Zetides seminigra Butler, 1882; Papilio macfarlanii Rothschild, 1916 (misspelling)

= Graphium macfarlanei =

Species of butterfly

Graphium macfarlanei, the green triangle butterfly or green triangle, is a butterfly of the family Papilionidae. It is found along the northern Gulf and north-eastern coast of Queensland, Australia; as well as on the Moluccas, New Guinea, Admiralty Islands and New Britain.

The wingspan is about 70 mm.

The larvae feed on Desmos species (including Desmos chinensis), Annona muricata and Rollinia deliciosa.

== Subspecies ==
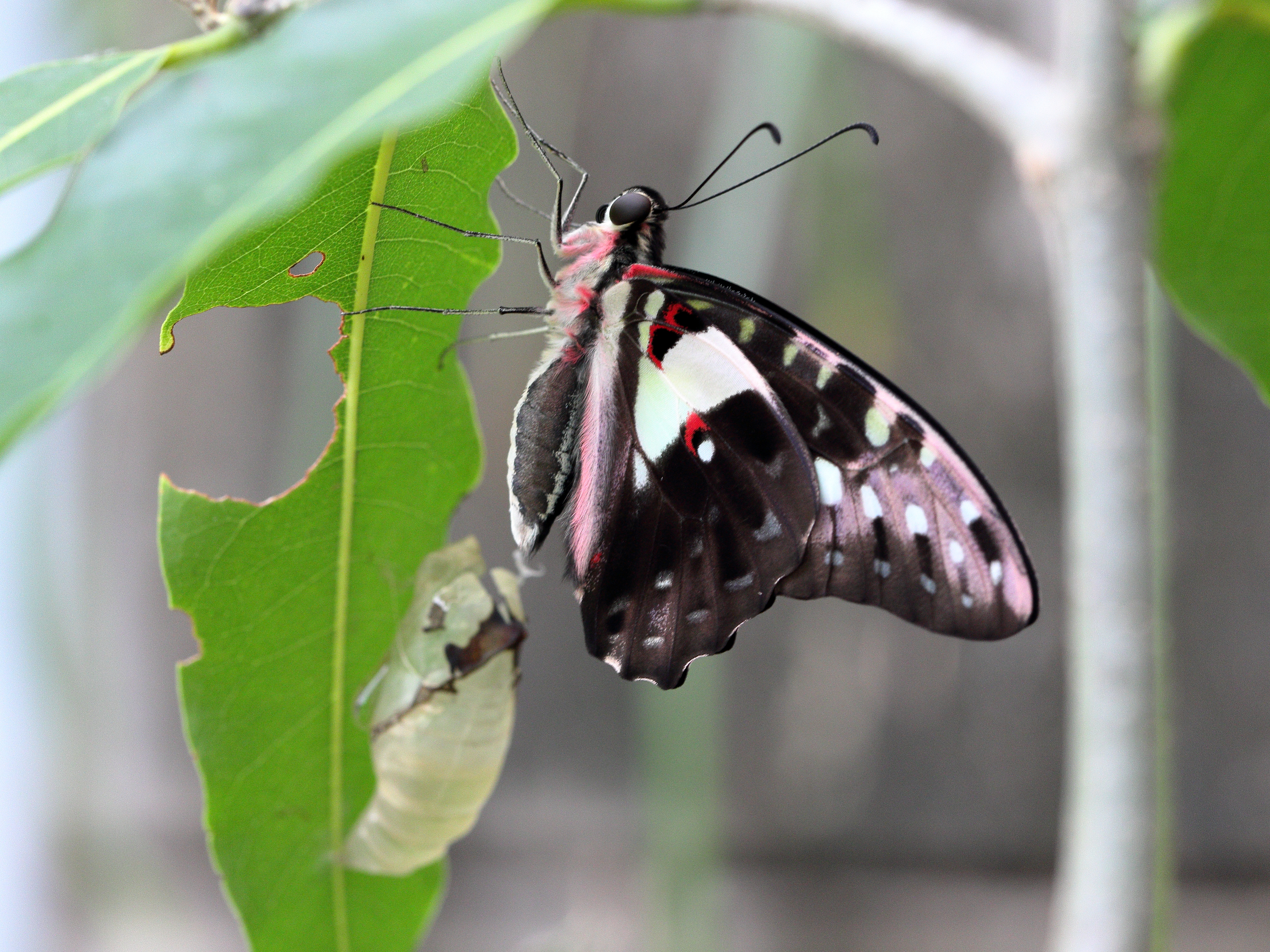
Green triangle in Cairns, Queensland, Australia

- Graphium macfarlanei macfarlanei (Bachan, Ternate, Halmahera, Waigeu, Misool, Salawati, western Irian to Papua, north-eastern Australia)
- Graphium macfarlanei cestius (Fruhstorfer, 1903) (Buru, Ambon, Serang)
- Graphium macfarlanei seminigra (Butler, 1882) (New Britain, New Ireland)
