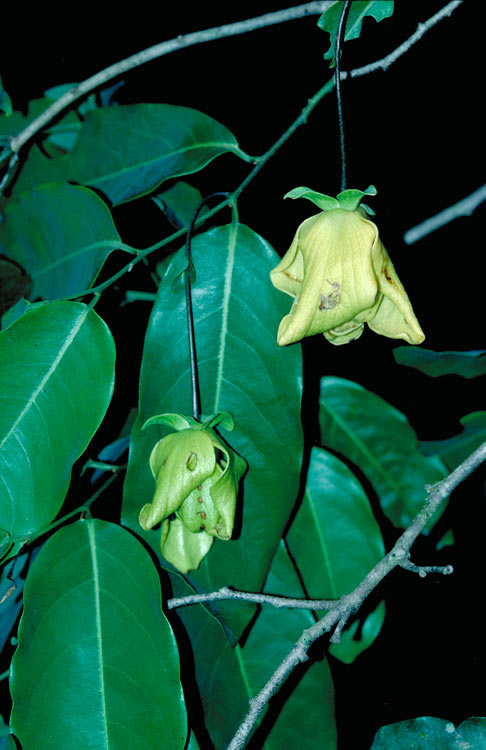
- Flowers

Conservation status
- Least Concern (NCA)

Scientific classification
- Kingdom: Plantae
- Clade: Tracheophytes
- Clade: Angiosperms
- Clade: Magnoliids
- Order: Magnoliales
- Family: Annonaceae
- Genus: Desmos
- Species: D. polycarpus

Binomial name
- Desmos polycarpus Jessup

= Desmos polycarpus =

Species of flowering plant

Desmos polycarpus is a species of plants in the custard apple family Annonaceae found only in northeastern Queensland, Australia. It is a vine with stems up to 5 cm (2.0 in) diameter, although it may appear as a scandent shrub when young. The leaves are simple and alternate and measure up to 16 cm (6.3 in) long by 6 cm (2.4 in) wide. Flowers are about 5 cm (2.0 in) wide and greenish yellow, with 3 sepals and 6 petals in two whorls of 3. The fruit is an apocarp about 1 cm (0.39 in) wide and 6 cm (2.4 in) long. It is found in rainforest and gallery forest from about Lockhart River on Cape York Peninsula, to the Atherton Tableland southwest of Cairns. It was first described by Australian botanist Laurence W. Jessup in 2007.

== Conservation ==
This species is listed as least concern under the Queensland Government's Nature Conservation Act. As of 11 January 2025, it has not been assessed by the International Union for Conservation of Nature (IUCN).
