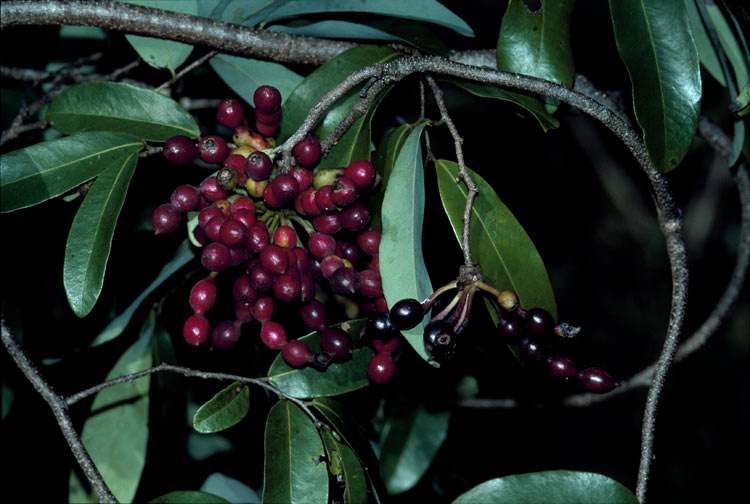
- Fruit

Conservation status
- Least Concern (NCA)

Scientific classification
- Kingdom: Plantae
- Clade: Tracheophytes
- Clade: Angiosperms
- Clade: Magnoliids
- Order: Magnoliales
- Family: Annonaceae
- Genus: Desmos
- Species: D. wardianus

Binomial name
- Desmos wardianus (F.M.Bailey) Jessup

Synonyms
- Unona wardiana F.M.Bailey

= Desmos wardianus =

Species of flowering plant

Desmos wardianus is a species of plants in the custard apple family Annonaceae found only in the Northern Territory and Queensland, Australia. It is a scrambling shrub or vine with a stem up to 8 cm (3.1 in) diameter. The leaves are simple and alternate and measure up to 8 cm (3.1 in) long by 3 cm (1.2 in) wide. Flowers are about 5 cm (2.0 in) wide and greenish yellow, with 3 sepals and 6 petals in two whorls of 3. The fruit takes the form of a cluster of apocarps, each about 7 mm (0.28 in) wide and 5 cm (2.0 in) long. It grows in drier rainforest types such as monsoon forest and gallery forest in the Top End region of the Northern Territory, and in Cape York Peninsula. It was first described by Frederick Manson Bailey in 1902 as Unona wardiana, and transferred to the current name by Australian botanist Laurence W. Jessup in 1986.

== Conservation ==
This species is listed as least concern under the Queensland Government's Nature Conservation Act. As of 13 January 2025, it has not been assessed by the International Union for Conservation of Nature (IUCN).
