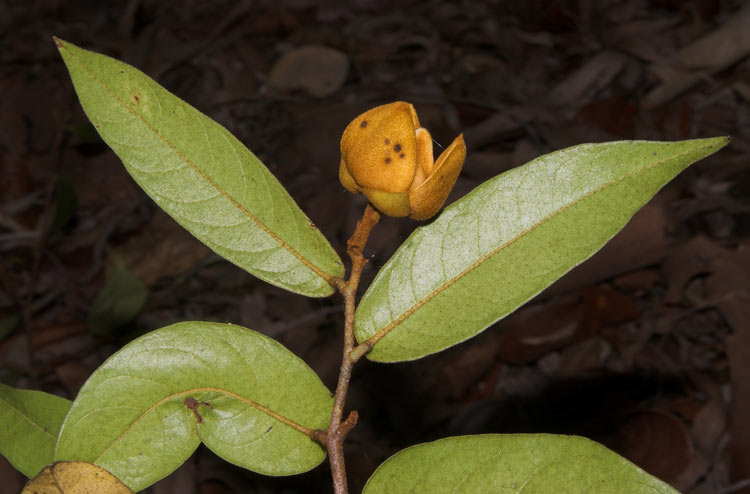
- Flower

Conservation status
- Least Concern (NCA)

Scientific classification
- Kingdom: Plantae
- Clade: Tracheophytes
- Clade: Angiosperms
- Clade: Magnoliids
- Order: Magnoliales
- Family: Annonaceae
- Genus: Uvaria
- Species: U. topazensis

Binomial name
- Uvaria topazensis (Jessup) L.L.Zhou, Y.C.F.Su & R.M.K.Saunders

Synonyms
- Melodorum topazense Jessup

= Uvaria topazensis =

Species of flowering plant

Uvaria topazensis is a plant in the custard apple family Annonaceae endemic to Queensland, Australia. It is a vine with a stem diameter up to 3 cm (1.2 in), first described as Melodorum topazensis by Australian botanist Laurence W. Jessup in 2007, and transferred to the genus Uvaria in 2010 by botanists Linlin Zhou, Yvonne Chuan Fang Su, and Richard M.K. Saunders. It grows in well developed rainforest on the Atherton Tableland southwest of Cairns, at altitudes between 600 and 700 m (2,000 and 2,300 ft).

== Taxonomy ==
The name Uvaria topazensis is not recognised by the Queensland Herbarium, and is considered a synonym of the original name Melodorum topazensis.

== Conservation ==
This species is listed (as Melodorum topazensis) as least concern under the Queensland Government's Nature Conservation Act. As of 10 January 2025, it has not been assessed by the International Union for Conservation of Nature (IUCN).

== Ecology ==
This species is a host plant for the larvae of the fourbar swordtail, green-spotted triangle and the pale green triangle butterflies.
