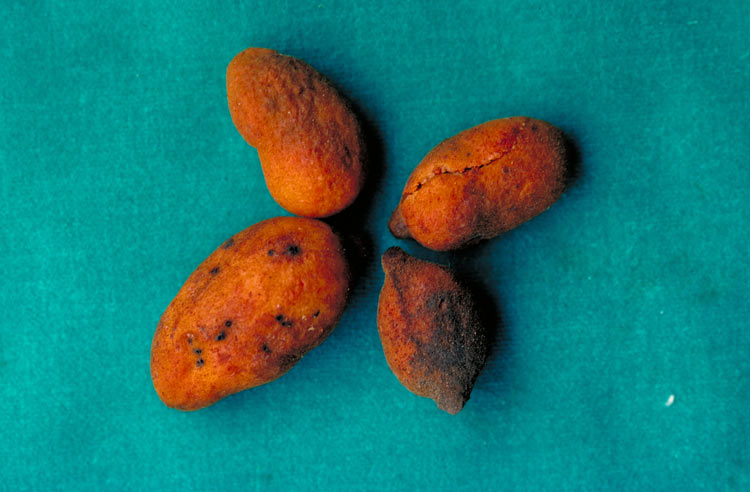
- Fruit

Conservation status
- Least Concern (NCA)

Scientific classification
- Kingdom: Plantae
- Clade: Embryophytes
- Clade: Tracheophytes
- Clade: Angiosperms
- Clade: Magnoliids
- Order: Magnoliales
- Family: Annonaceae
- Genus: Uvaria
- Species: U. scabridula

Binomial name
- Uvaria scabridula R.M.K.Saunders

Synonyms
- Melodorum scabridulum Jessup

= Uvaria scabridula =

Species of flowering plant

Uvaria scabridula is a species of plants in the custard apple family Annonaceae endemic to Cape York Peninsula, Queensland, Australia. It is a vine with a stem diameter up to 6 cm (2.4 in) which grows in gallery forest and monsoon forest at altitudes from sea level up to 200 m (660 ft). It was first described (as Melodorum scabridulum) in 2007 by Australian botanist Laurence W. Jessup, then transferred to its current name in 2010 by Linlin Zhou et al. The Queensland Herbarium does not accept the latter combination.

== Conservation ==
This species is listed as least concern under the Queensland Government's Nature Conservation Act. As of 15 April 2025, it has not been assessed by the International Union for Conservation of Nature (IUCN).

== Ecology ==
Uvaria scabridula is a host plant for larvae of the Fourbar Swordtail, Green Spotted Triangle and the Pale Green Triangle butterflies.
