= Desmos zeylanicus =

Scientific classification
- Kingdom: Plantae
- Clade: Tracheophytes
- Clade: Angiosperms
- Clade: Magnoliids
- Order: Magnoliales
- Family: Annonaceae
- Genus: Desmos
- Species: D. zeylanicus

Binomial name
- Desmos zeylanicus (Hook.f. & Thomson) Saff.

Species of flowering plant

Desmos zeylanicus is a species of plant in the family Annonaceae endemic to Sri Lanka. In antiquity it was sometimes used as a folk remedy for genital warts, however, there is no scientific evidence to support its efficacy for such.
