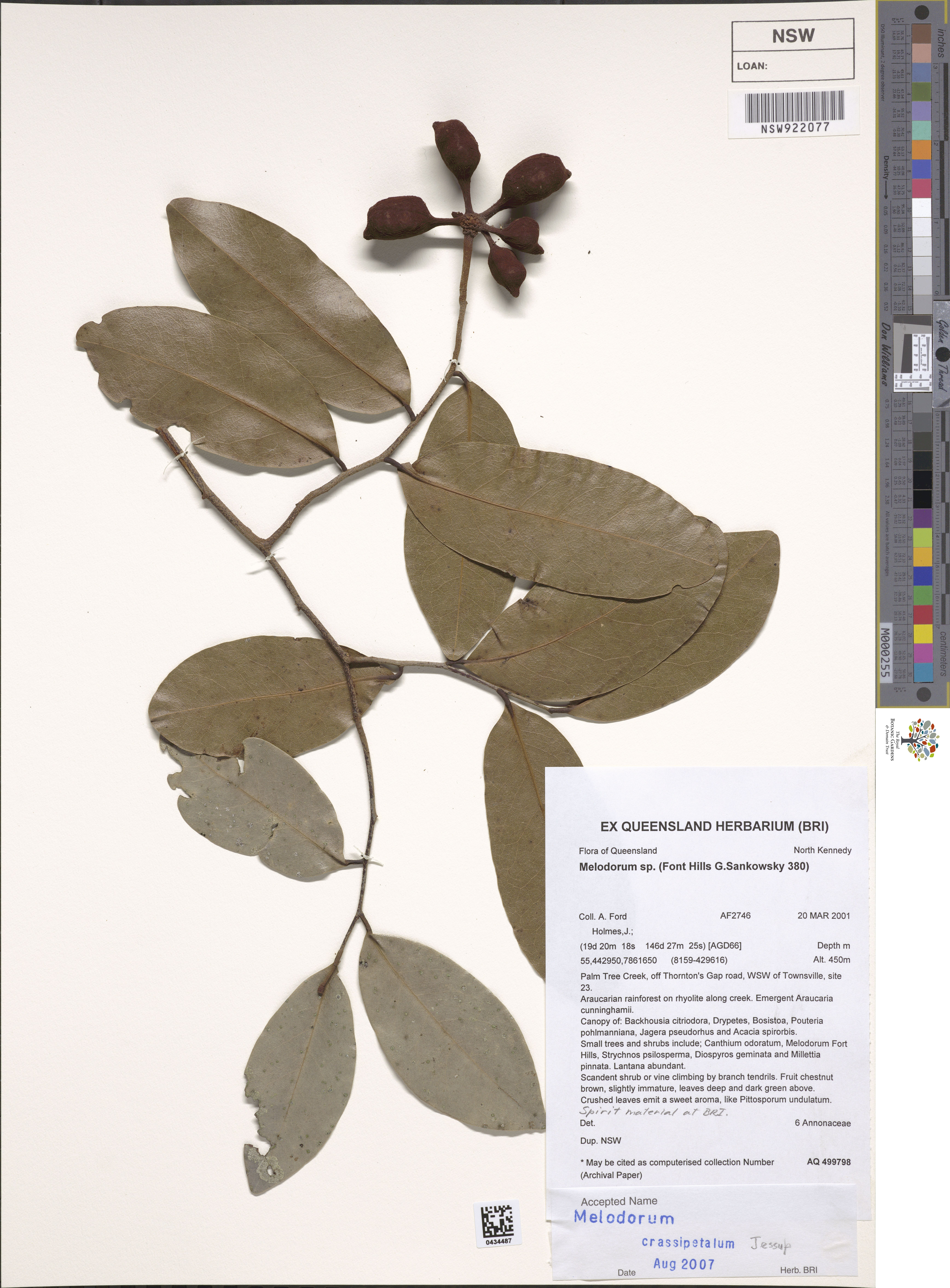
- Fruit

Conservation status
- Least Concern (NCA)

Scientific classification
- Kingdom: Plantae
- Clade: Tracheophytes
- Clade: Angiosperms
- Clade: Magnoliids
- Order: Magnoliales
- Family: Annonaceae
- Genus: Uvaria
- Species: U. sankowskyi

Binomial name
- Uvaria sankowskyi L.L.Zhou, Y.C.F.Su & R.M.K.Saunders

Synonyms
- Melodorum crassipetalum Jessup

= Uvaria sankowskyi =

Species of flowering plant

Uvaria sankowskyi is a species of plant in the custard apple family Annonaceae native to Queensland, Australia. It is a vine with a stem diameter up to 5 cm (2.0 in) which inhabits monsoon forest and vine thickets from about Coen south to the Eungella National Park west of Mackay. It was previously named Melodorum crassipetalum and is still recognised under that name by the Queensland Herbarium.

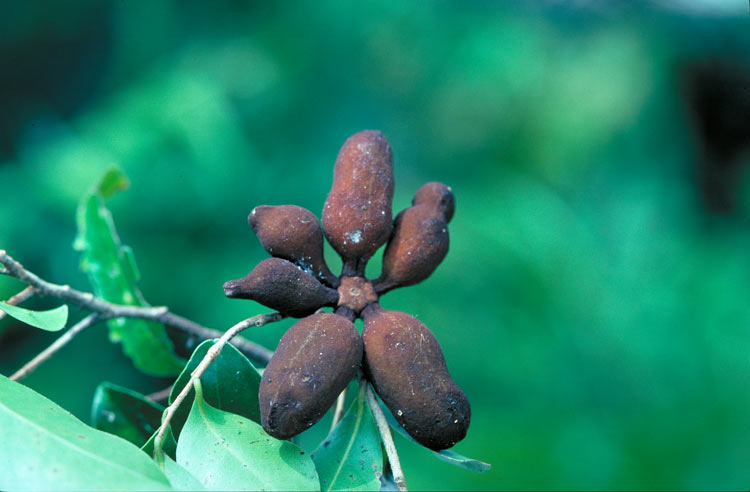
Fruit

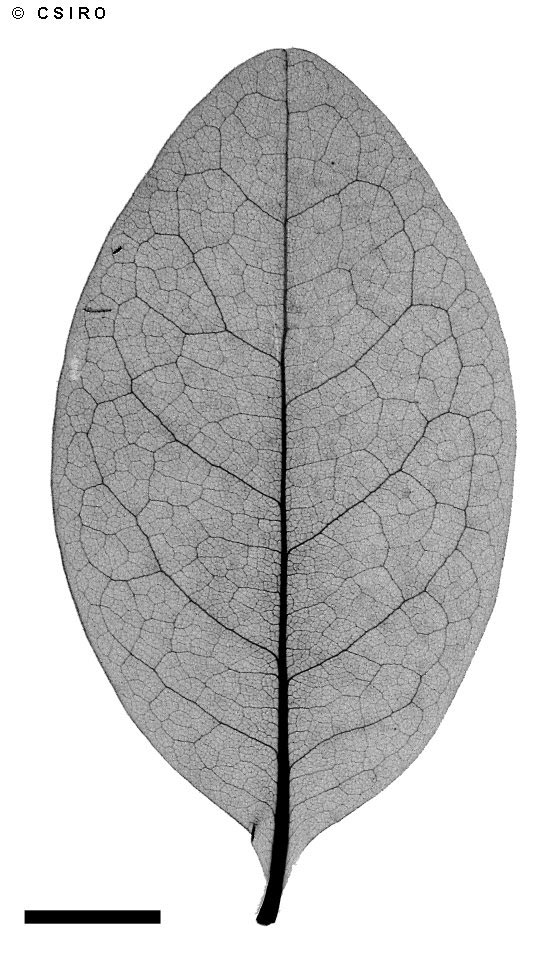
Xray of leaf

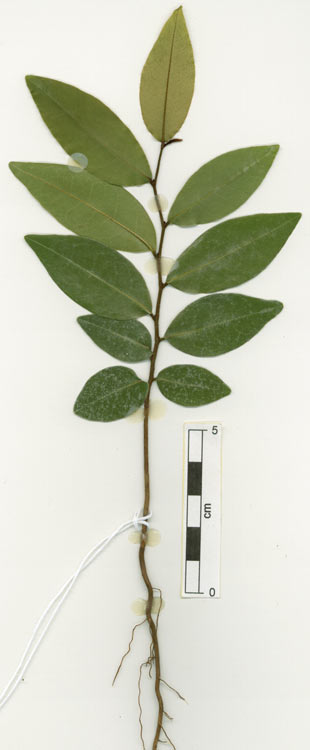
Seedling
