= Uvaria unguiculata =

Conservation status
- Least Concern (NCA)

Scientific classification
- Kingdom: Plantae
- Clade: Tracheophytes
- Clade: Angiosperms
- Clade: Magnoliids
- Order: Magnoliales
- Family: Annonaceae
- Genus: Uvaria
- Species: U. unguiculata

Binomial name
- Uvaria unguiculata R.M.K.Saunders

Synonyms
- Melodorum unguiculatum Jessup

Species of flowering plant

Uvaria unguiculata is a species of plant in the custard apple family Annonaceae native to Cape York Peninsula in Queensland, Australia. It is a tendril climber with a stem diameter of up to 8 cm (3.1 in), which inhabits lowland gallery forest at altitudes up to about 100 m (330 ft). Its range extends from about Coen to the northern tip of Cape York.
