= Uvaria micrantha =

Scientific classification
- Kingdom: Plantae
- Clade: Tracheophytes
- Clade: Angiosperms
- Clade: Magnoliids
- Order: Magnoliales
- Family: Annonaceae
- Genus: Uvaria
- Species: U. micrantha

Binomial name
- Uvaria micrantha (A.DC.) Hook.f. & Thomson

Synonyms
- Cyathostemma micranthum (A.DC.) J.Sinclair; Guatteria micrantha A.DC.; Uva micrantha (A.DC.) Kuntze; Anaxagorea sumatrana Miq.; Cyathostemma sumatranum (Miq.) Boerl.; Polyalthia fruticans A.DC.; Popowia nitida King; Uva sumatrana (Miq.) Kuntze; Uvaria lanceolata Scheff.; Uvaria sumatrana (Miq.) Kurz

Species of flowering plant

Uvaria micrantha is a plant in the custard apple family Annonaceae native to Indo-China, Malesia, New Guinea, and northern parts of Western Australia and Queensland. It is a scrambling shrub or vine with a stem diameter up 5 cm (2.0 in) which inhabits monsoon forest and gallery forest.

It is a host plant for larvae of the green-spotted triangle butterfly.
