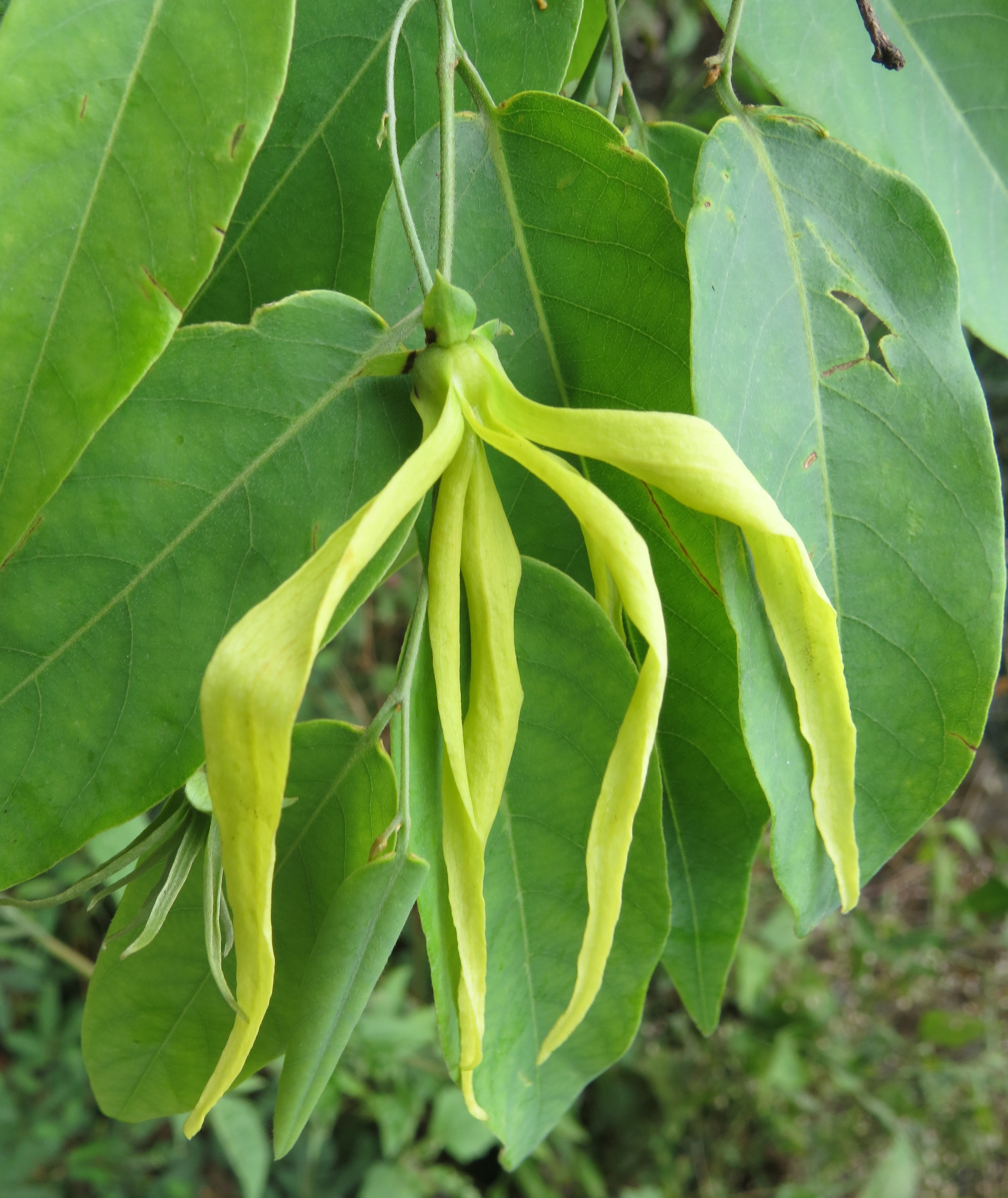
- Desmos chinensis; detail of the flower

Scientific classification
- Kingdom: Plantae
- Clade: Tracheophytes
- Clade: Angiosperms
- Clade: Magnoliids
- Order: Magnoliales
- Family: Annonaceae
- Genus: Desmos
- Species: D. chinensis

Binomial name
- Desmos chinensis Lour.

Synonyms
- List: Unona chinensis (Lour.) DC.; Artabotrys esquirolii H.Lév.; Desmos chinensis var. brevifolius (Teijsm. & Binn. ex Boerl.) Bân; Desmos chinensis var. jarawae Chakrab. & Diwakar; Desmos chinensis var. laevigatus (Hook.f. & Thomson) D.Mitra; Desmos chinensis var. latifolia (Hook.f. & Thomson) Karthik. & Moorthy; Desmos chinensis var. lawii (Hook.f. & Thomson) Bân; Desmos chinensis var. macropetalus (Teijsm. & Binn. ex Boerl.) Bân; Desmos chinensis var. pubescens (Hook.f. & Thomson) Deb; Desmos chinensis var. pubiflora (Hook.f. & Thomson) Karthik. & Moorthy; Desmos lawii (Hook.f. & Thomson) Saff.; Polyalthia lawii (Hook.f. & Thomson) Finet & Gagnep.; Unona amherstiana Wall. ex A.DC.; Unona biglandulosa Blume; Unona cordifolia Roxb. ex Hook.f. & Thomson; Unona discolor Vahl; Unona discolor var. angustipetala Boerl.; Unona discolor var. bracteata Blume; Unona discolor var. brevifolia Teijsm. & Binn. ex Boerl.; Unona discolor var. laevigata Hook.f. & Thomson; Unona discolor var. latifolia Hook.f. & Thomson; Unona discolor var. macropetala Teijsm. & Binn. ex Boerl.; Unona discolor var. neglecta Boerl.; Unona discolor var. pachypetala Teijsm. & Binn. ex Boerl.; Unona discolor var. parviflora Miq.; Unona discolor var. pubescens Hook.f. & Thomson; Unona discolor var. pubiflora Hook.f. & Thomson; Unona discolor var. siamensis Scheff. ex Boerl.; Unona laevigata Wall.; Unona lawii Hook.f. & Thomson; Unona lessertiana Dunal; Unona monilifera (Gaertn.) DC.; Unona moniliformis Steud.; Unona roxburghiana Wall.; Unona undulata Wall.; Uvaria amherstiana (Wall. ex A.DC.) Walp.; Uvaria cordifolia Roxb.; Uvaria discolor (Vahl) Walp.; Uvaria monilifera Gaertn.; Uvaria uncata Vahl ex DC.; Uvaria undulata Roxb.; Uvaria undulata Walp.; Magnolia echinina P.Parm.

= Desmos chinensis =

Species of flowering plant

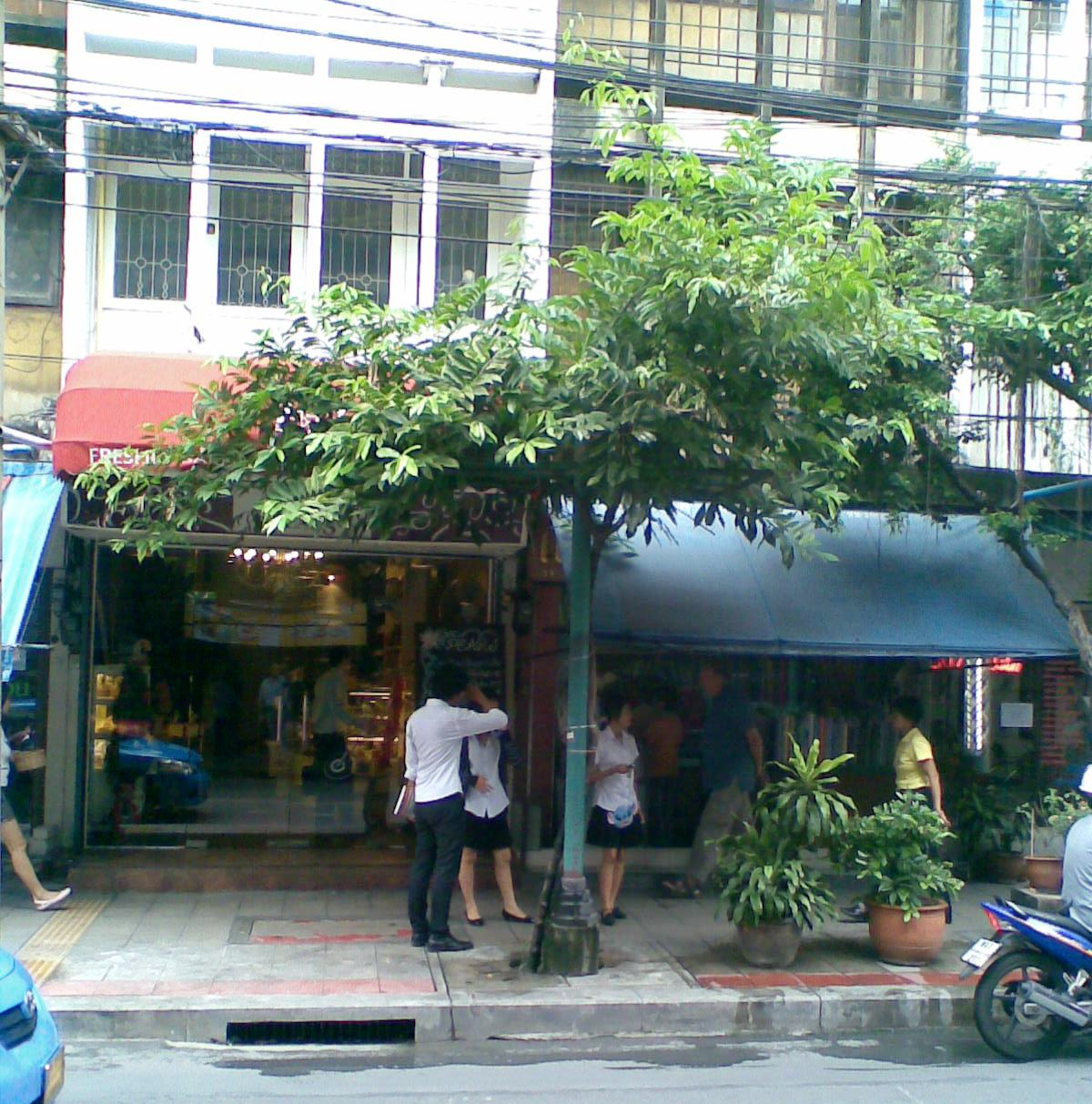
Desmos chinensis growing as a shade tree in Bangkok; note the blue metal support

Desmos chinensis is a species of flowering plant in the family Annonaceae. The yellowish-green flowers are similar to the Ylang-ylang flowers, therefore this plant is sometimes known as dwarf ylang-ylang. Their smell, however, is much less strong and is only felt in the morning. By midday it has mostly faded away.

== Description and habitat ==
It is a vine or spreading shrub that may grow up to 4 m high if it finds an adequate support, otherwise it rarely grows taller than 150 cm. Its pollen is shed as permanent tetrads.

Desmos chinensis is found throughout Southeast Asia from Nepal to the Philippines. It grows at the edge of forests in flat areas at elevations up to 600 m. It may grow as a ruderal plant on the sides of roads, rural causeways and other disturbed terrain. It thrives in slightly shady places.

This tree is commonly used within the Bangkok urban landscape. Desmos chinensis is used to create shade along various sidewalks and bus stops. It is widely utilised in city settings, due to its dense leaf growth which provides cool shade, a relatively thin trunk and a root system that doesn't break sidewalk pavement.
