= Uvaria dac =

Scientific classification
- Kingdom: Plantae
- Clade: Tracheophytes
- Clade: Angiosperms
- Clade: Magnoliids
- Order: Magnoliales
- Family: Annonaceae
- Genus: Uvaria
- Species: U. dac

Binomial name
- Uvaria dac Pierre ex Finet & Gagnep.

Synonyms
- Uvaria varaigneana Pierre ex Finet & Gagnep.

Species of plant

Uvaria dac is a species of flowering plant in the family Annonaceae, native to Indochina. Anti-austerity agents can be derived from its leaves.
