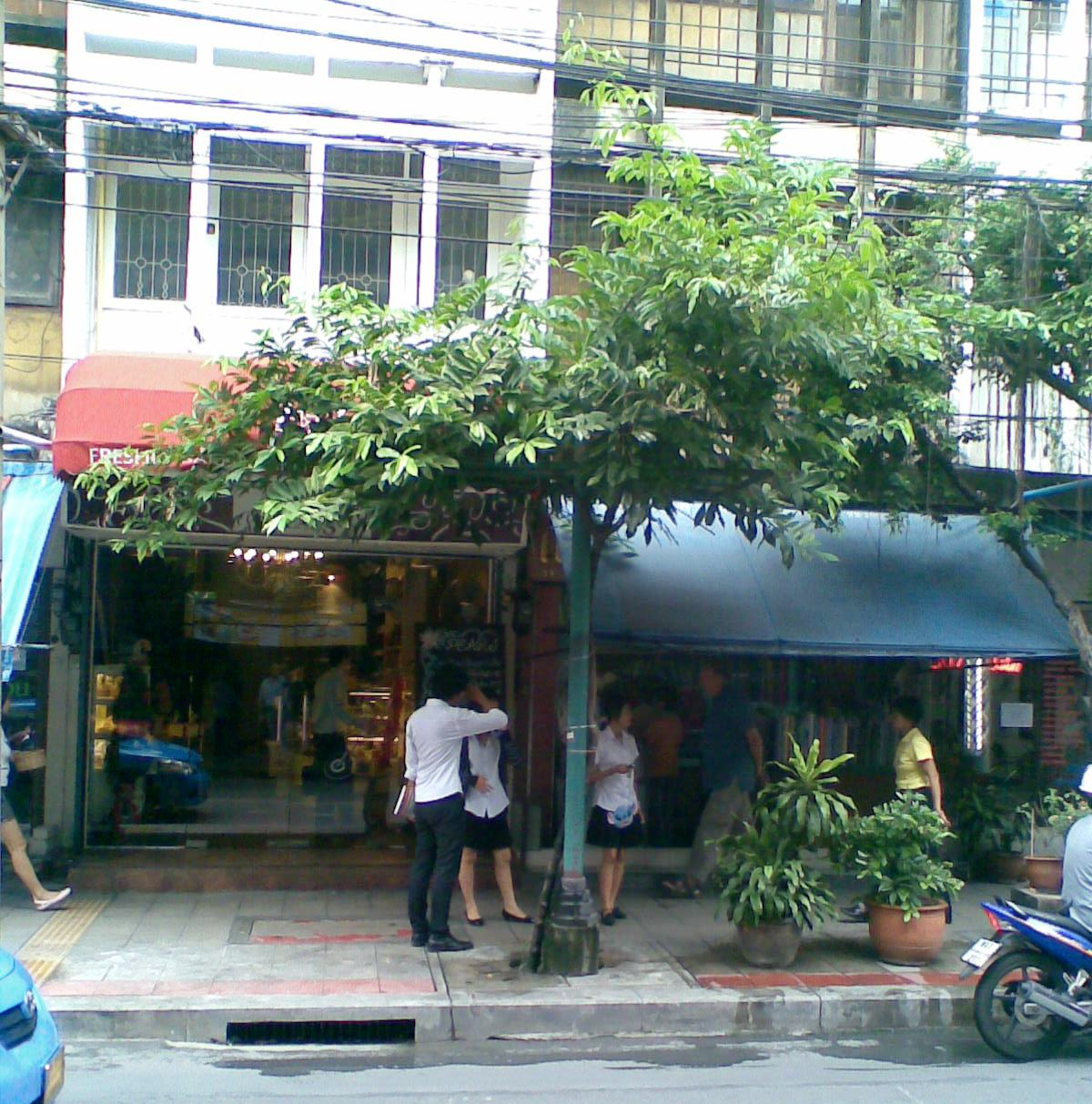
- Desmos chinensis growing as a shade tree in Bangkok

Scientific classification
- Kingdom: Plantae
- Clade: Tracheophytes
- Clade: Angiosperms
- Clade: Magnoliids
- Order: Magnoliales
- Family: Annonaceae
- Subfamily: Annonoideae
- Tribe: Uvarieae
- Genus: Desmos; Lour.

Synonyms
- Camphorina Noronha

= Desmos (plant) =

Genus of flowering plants

Desmos is a genus of plants in the custard apple family Annonaceae, native to areas from India and China, through tropical Asia to northern Australia.

== Description ==
Plants in this genus are vines, shrubs, or occasionally small trees. Flowers are mostly solitary and terminal, or in some species are produced in the leaf axils. They are bisexual, i.e. they have both male and female organs. There are 3 sepals and 6 petals arranged in two rings of 3. Stamens and carpels both numerous. The fruits are apocarps.

== Distribution ==
The genus is native to the following areas:

- Indian subcontinent – Assam, Bangladesh, East Himalaya, India, Nepal, Sri Lanka.
- China – China South-Central, China Southeast, Hainan.
- Indo-China – Cambodia, Laos, Myanmar, Thailand, Vietnam.
- Malesia – Borneo, Jawa, Lesser Sunda Is., Malaya, Nicobar Is., Philippines, Sulawesi, Sumatera.
- Australia – Northern Territory, Queensland.

== Species ==
As of January 2025, Plants of the World Online and World Flora Online accept the following 18 species:

- Desmos acutus (Teijsm. & Binn.) I.M.Turner
- Desmos chinensis Lour.
- Desmos chryseus (Miq.) Merr.
- Desmos cochinchinensis Lour.
- Desmos costatus (Miq.) Merr.
- Desmos dinhensis (Pierre ex Finet & Gagnep.) Merr.
- Desmos dumosus (Roxb.) Saff.
- Desmos dunalii (Wall. ex Hook.f. & Thomson) Saff.
- Desmos elegans (Thwaites) Saff.
- Desmos goezeanus (F.Muell.) Jessup
- Desmos grandifolius (Finet & Gagnep.) C.Y.Wu ex P.T.Li
- Desmos macrocarpus Bân
- Desmos pedunculosus (A.DC.) Bân
- Desmos polycarpus Jessup
- Desmos subbiglandulosus (Miq.) Merr.
- Desmos viridiflorus Saff.
- Desmos wardianus (F.M.Bailey) Jessup
- Desmos zeylanicus (Hook.f. & Thomson) Saff.
