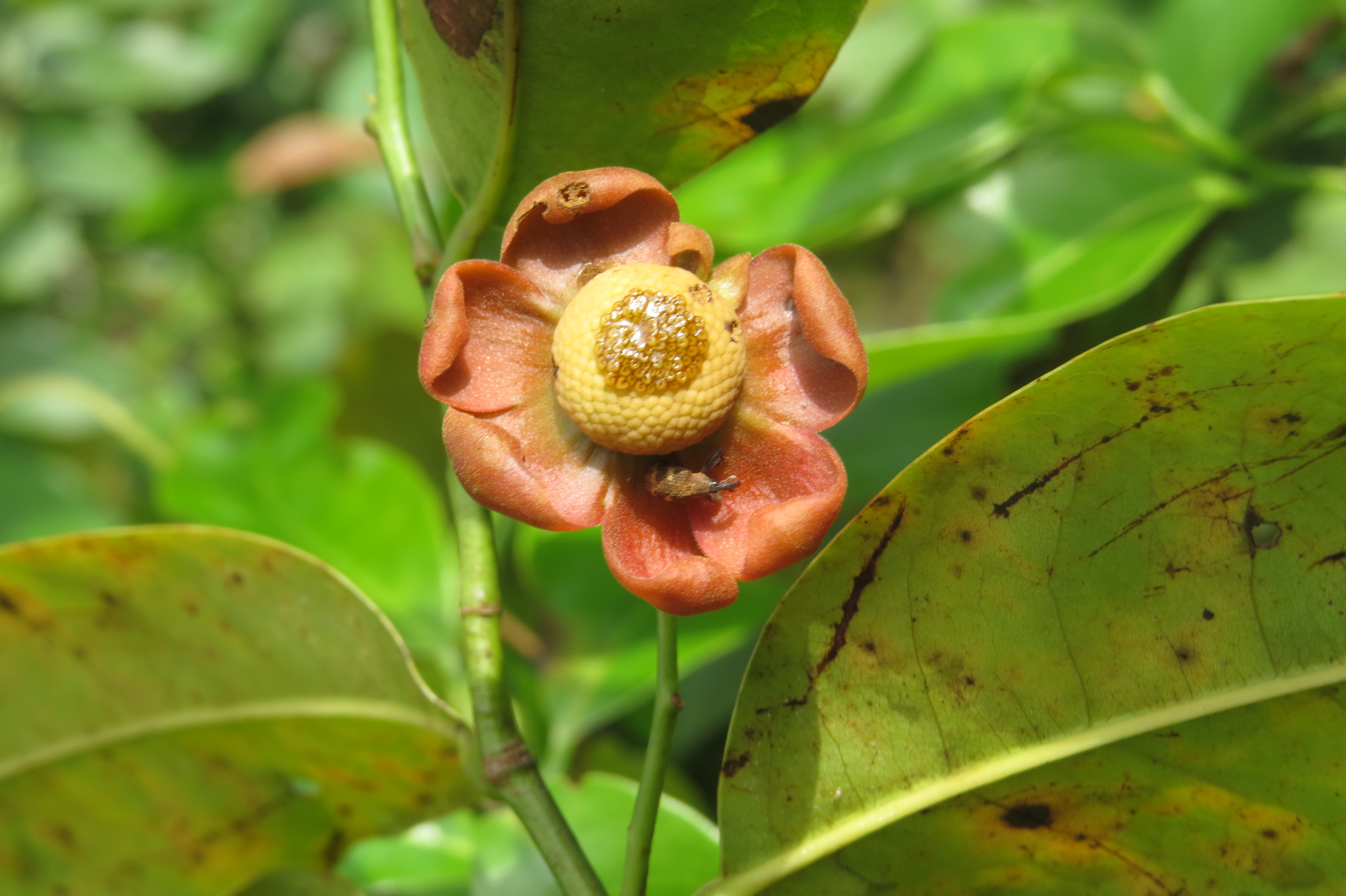

Scientific classification
- Kingdom: Plantae
- Clade: Tracheophytes
- Clade: Angiosperms
- Clade: Magnoliids
- Order: Magnoliales
- Family: Annonaceae
- Genus: Uvaria
- Species: U. narum

Binomial name
- Uvaria narum (Dunal) Wall.

= Uvaria narum =

Species of flowering plant

Uvaria narum is a large woody climber belonging to the family Annonaceae which occurs in the hilly regions of western peninsular India and Sri Lanka. It was described by Nathaniel Wallich in his catalogue at serial 6473 in 1829. Essential oils can be extracted from the leaves of the plant.

== Gallery ==
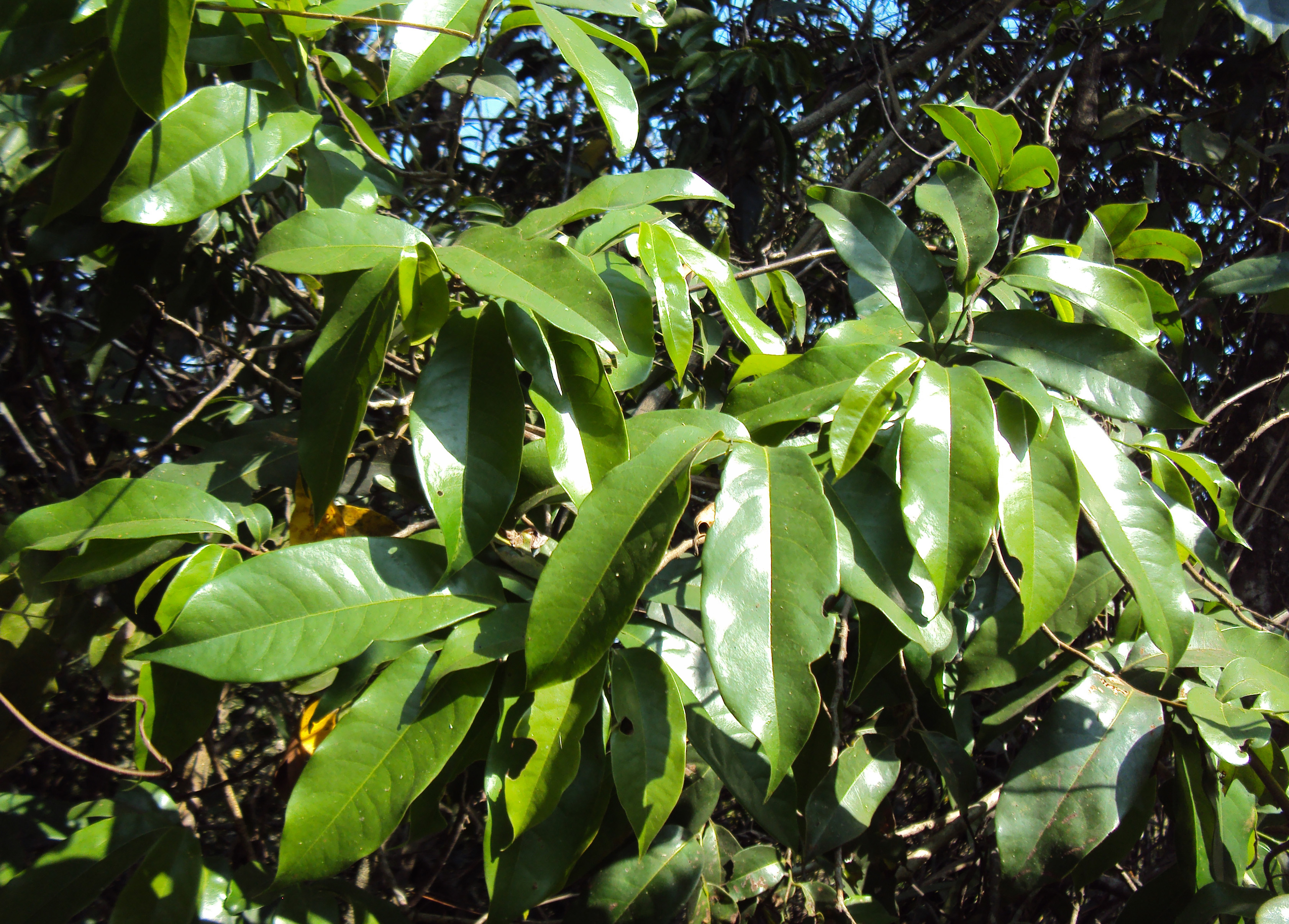
Plant

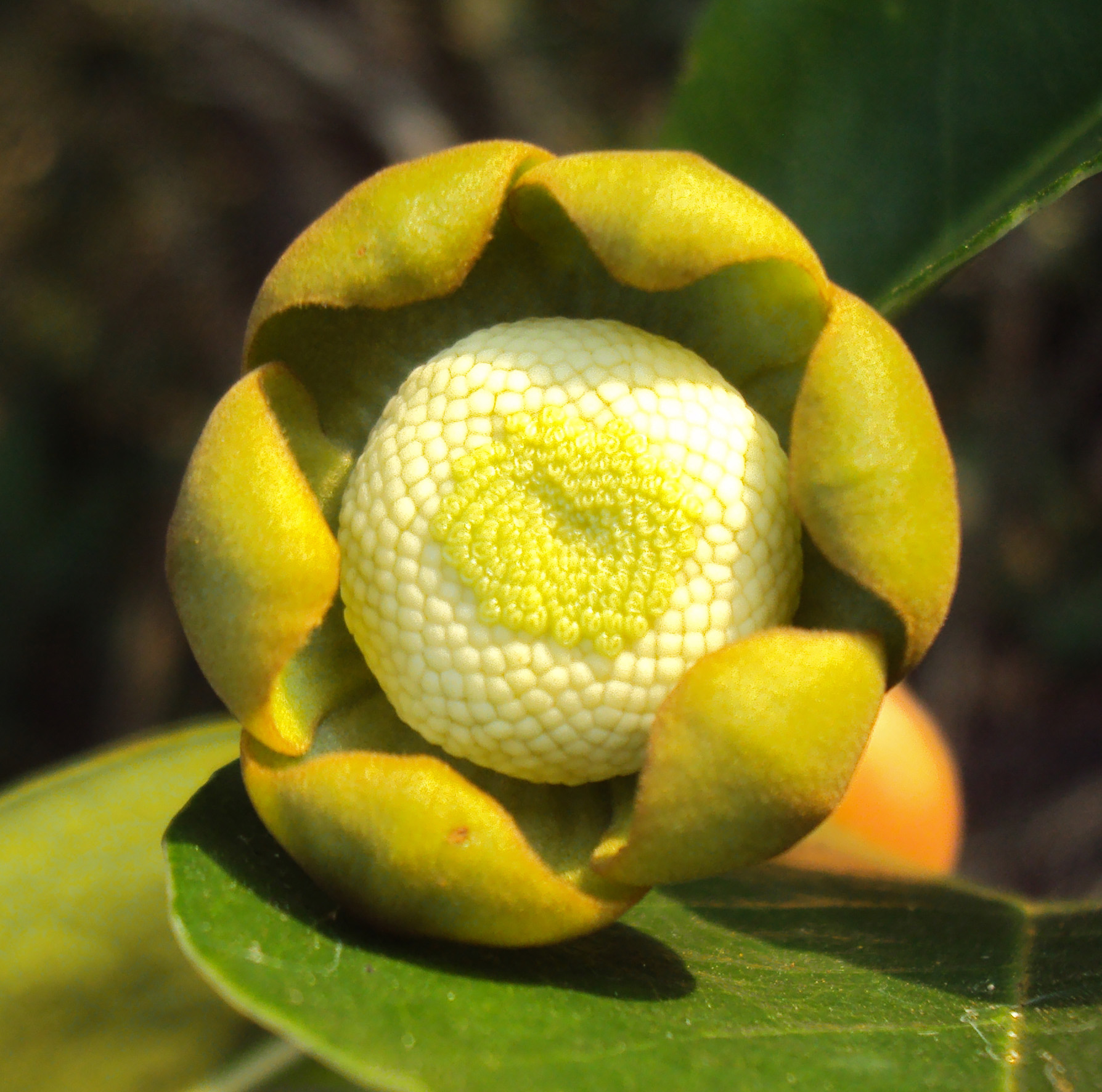
Flower

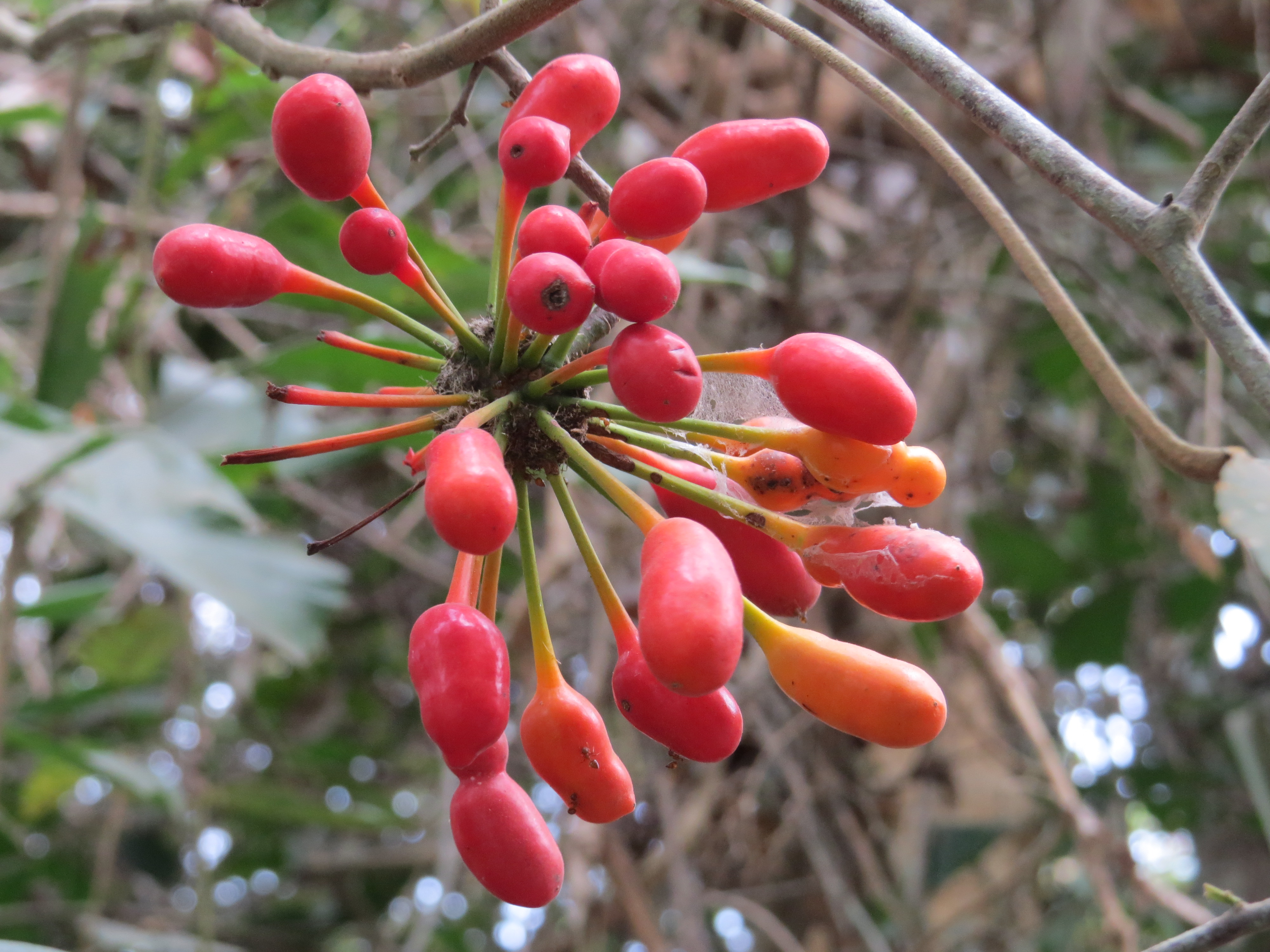
Fruits

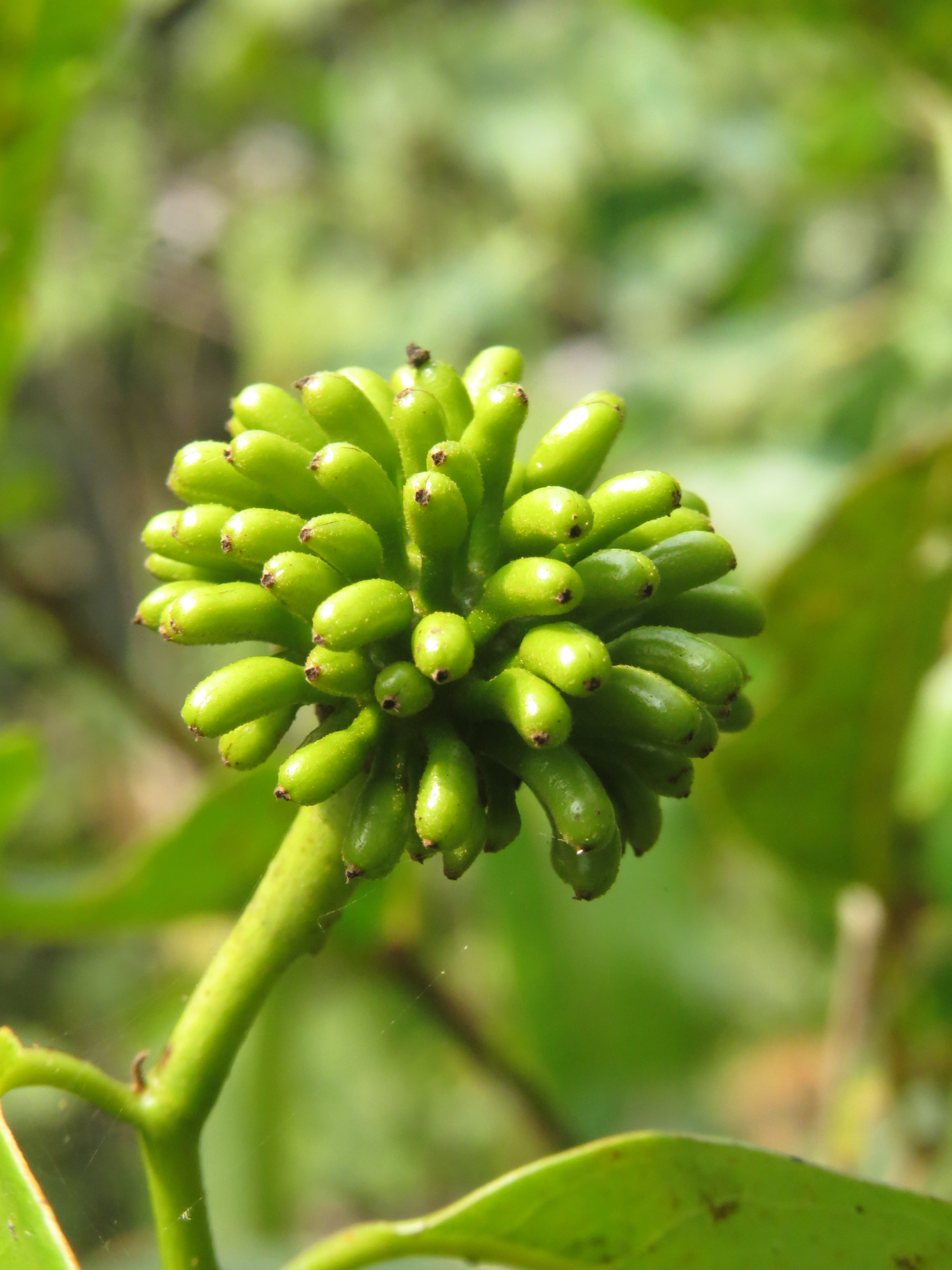
Fruits

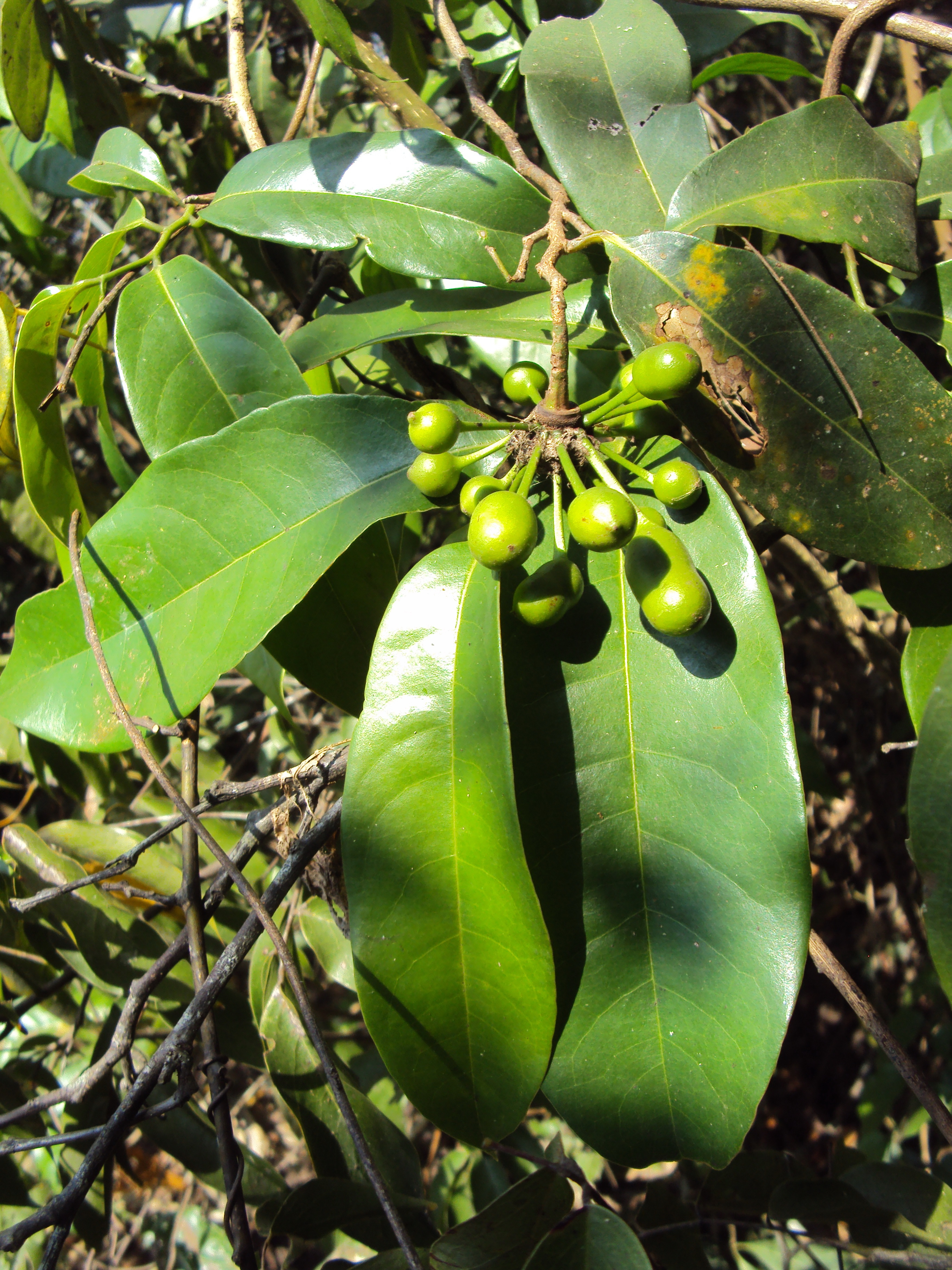
Fruits
