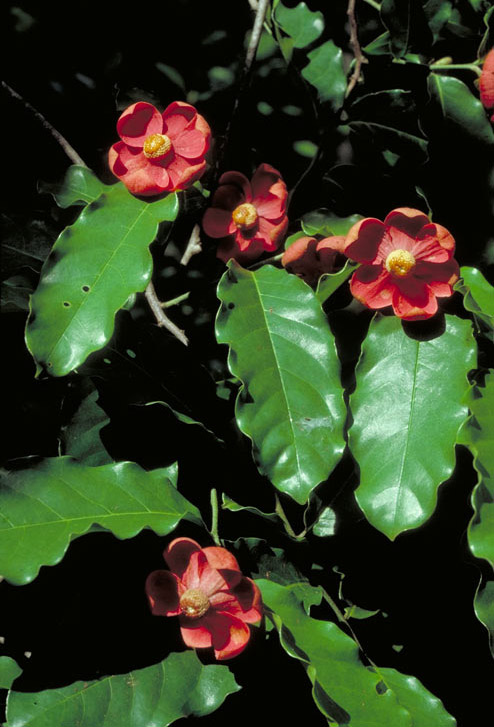
- Flower

Conservation status
- Least Concern (NCA)

Scientific classification
- Kingdom: Plantae
- Clade: Embryophytes
- Clade: Tracheophytes
- Clade: Spermatophytes
- Clade: Angiosperms
- Clade: Magnoliids
- Order: Magnoliales
- Family: Annonaceae
- Genus: Uvaria
- Species: U. concava

Binomial name
- Uvaria concava Teijsm. & Binn.

Synonyms
- 18 synonyms: Uva concava (Teijsm. & Binn.) Kuntze; Unona leytensis Elmer; Uva lurida (Hook.f. & Thomson) Kuntze; Uva membranacea (Benth.) Kuntze; Uvaria celebica Scheff.; Uvaria eucincta Bedd. ex Dunn; Uvaria hookeri King; Uvaria lauterbachiana Diels; Uvaria leytensis (Elmer) Merr.; Uvaria lurida Hook.f. & Thomson; Uvaria lurida var. macrophylla Hook.f. & Thomson; Uvaria lurida var. sikkimensis King; Uvaria membranacea Benth.; Uvaria narum var. macrophylla (Hook.f. & Thomson) Hook.f. & Thomson; Uvaria nudistellata Elmer; Uvaria sessiliflora Rchb.f. & Zoll.; Uvaria stellata Merr.; Uvaria sympetala Merr.

= Uvaria concava =

Calabao

Species of flowering plant

Uvaria concava, commonly known as calabao, is a plant in the custard apple family Annonaceae that is native throughout tropical Asia, from India to northern Australia. It is a rainforest climber, first described in 1855.

== Description ==
This is a scrambling shrub or woody vine with a stem diameter up to 5 cm (2 in). Young branches are covered in reddish-brown or golden hairs. Leaves arranged alternately on the twigs and are hairless on both sides. They are elliptic to obovate in shape and can grow to be 25 cm (9.8 in) long and 9 cm (3.5 in) wide.

Large red flowers appear singly on the twigs, opposite the leaves. They have three sepals and six petals arranged in two whorls of three, each measuring about 28 mm (1.1 in) long and 22 mm (0.9 in) wide. The flowers have about 120 stamens and 30 to 40 carpels. The fruit is a cluster of fruiting carpels.

== Distribution and habitat ==
It grows in and near rainforest, monsoon forest and gallery forest up to about 100 m (330 ft) above sea level. In Queensland it occurs on the east coast, from near Cairns to the top of Cape York Peninsula.

It is native to the following regions as defined in the World Geographical Scheme for Recording Plant Distributions:

- Indian Subcontinent: Assam, Bangladesh, East Himalaya, India
- Indo-China: Andaman Is., Nicobar Is., Thailand, Vietnam
- Malesia: Borneo, Jawa, Lesser Sunda Is., Malaya, Philippines, Sulawesi, Sumatera
- Papuasia: New Guinea
- Australia: Queensland

== Conservation ==
This species is listed as least concern under the Queensland Government's Nature Conservation Act. As of 1 July 2026, it has not been assessed by the International Union for Conservation of Nature.
