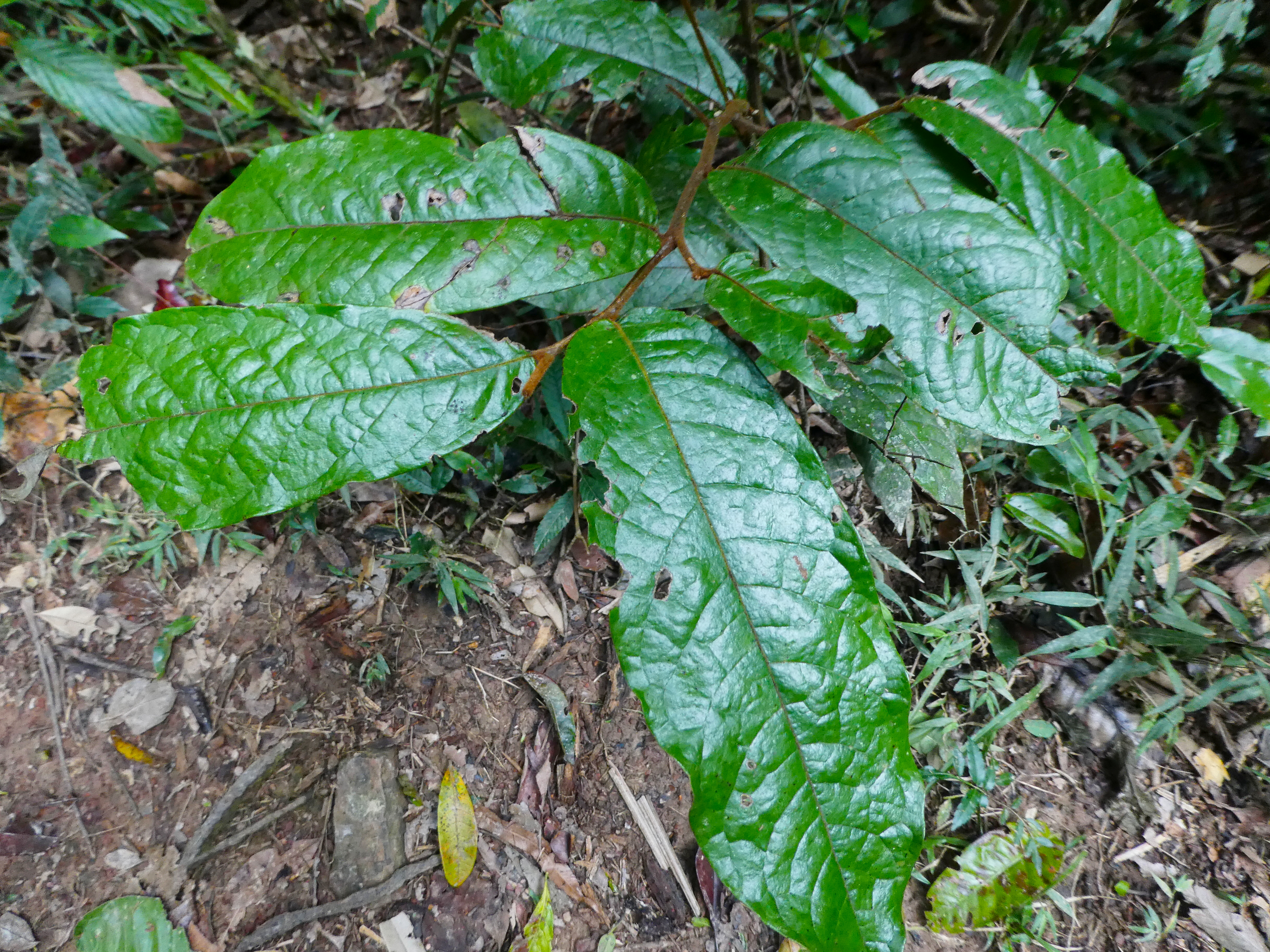

Conservation status
- Least Concern (NCA)

Scientific classification
- Kingdom: Plantae
- Clade: Tracheophytes
- Clade: Angiosperms
- Clade: Magnoliids
- Order: Magnoliales
- Family: Annonaceae
- Genus: Uvaria
- Species: U. uhrii

Binomial name
- Uvaria uhrii (F.Muell.) L.L.Zhou, Y.C.F.Su & R.M.K.Saunders

Synonyms
- Melodorum uhrii F.Muell.

= Uvaria uhrii =

Species of flowering plant

Uvaria uhrii is a plant in the custard apple family Annonaceae endemic to Queensland, Australia. It is a vine with a stem diameter up to 9 cm (3.5 in), first described as Melodorum uhrii by Ferdinand von Mueller in 1867, and transferred to the genus Uvaria in 2010 by botanists Linlin Zhou, Yvonne Su, and Richard Saunders. It inhabits rainforest from Cooktown southwards to Proserpine.

== Taxonomy ==
The name Uvaria uhrii is not recognised by the Queensland Herbarium, and is considered a synonym of the original name Melodorum uhrii.

== Conservation ==
This species is listed as least concern under the Queensland Government's Nature Conservation Act. As of 7 November 2024, it has not been assessed by the International Union for Conservation of Nature (IUCN).

== Gallery ==
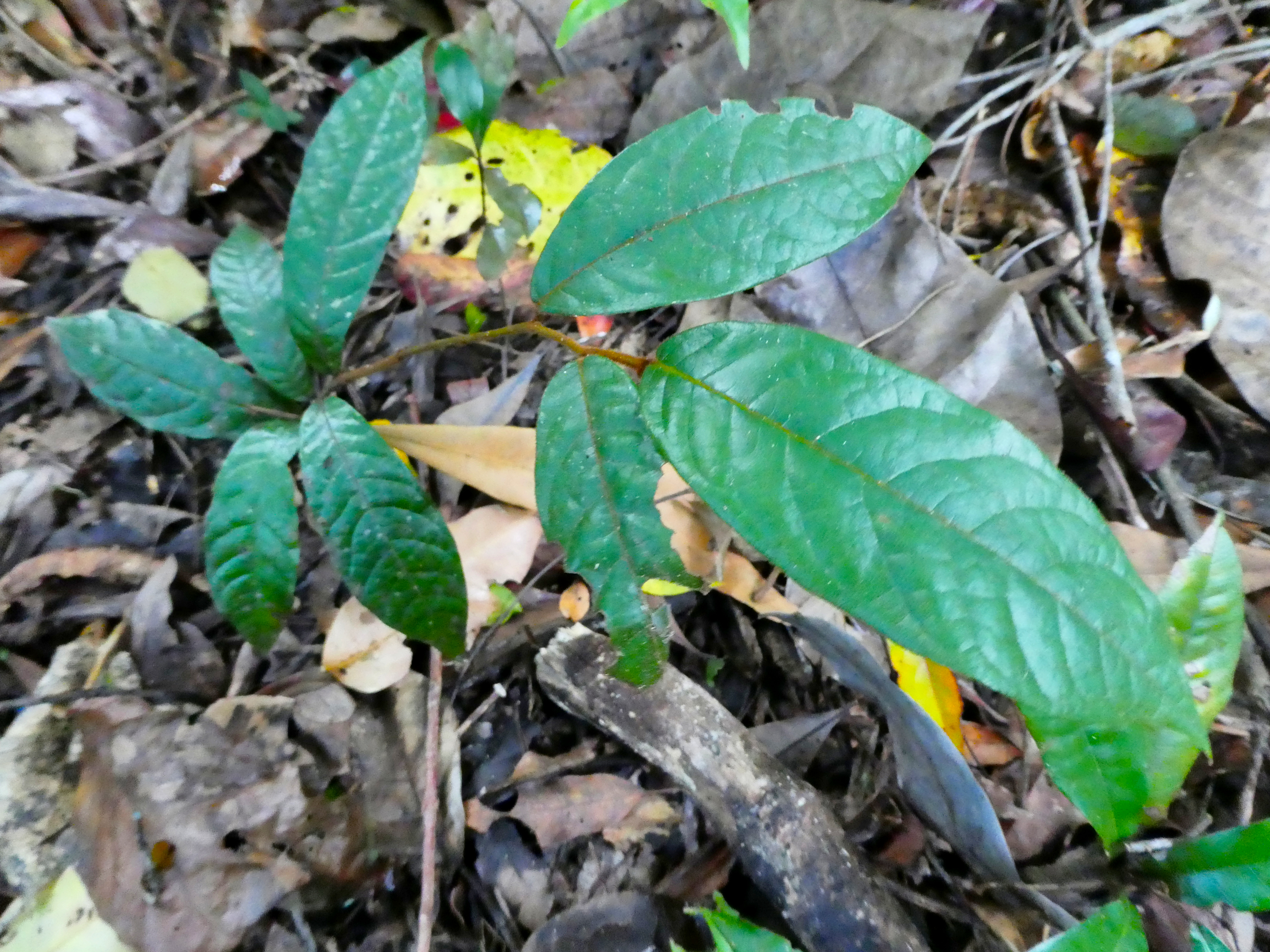
Foliage

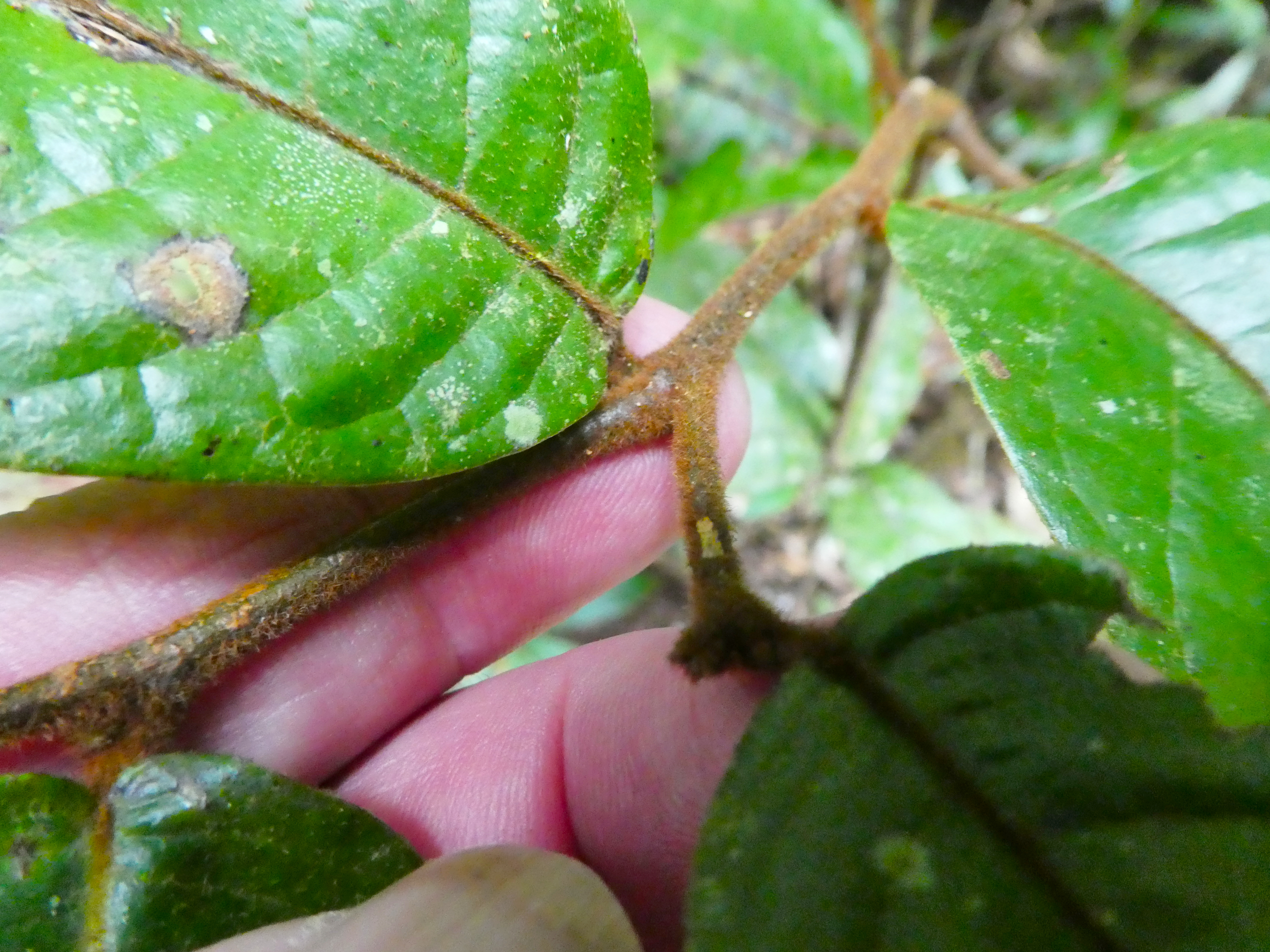
Hairy twigs

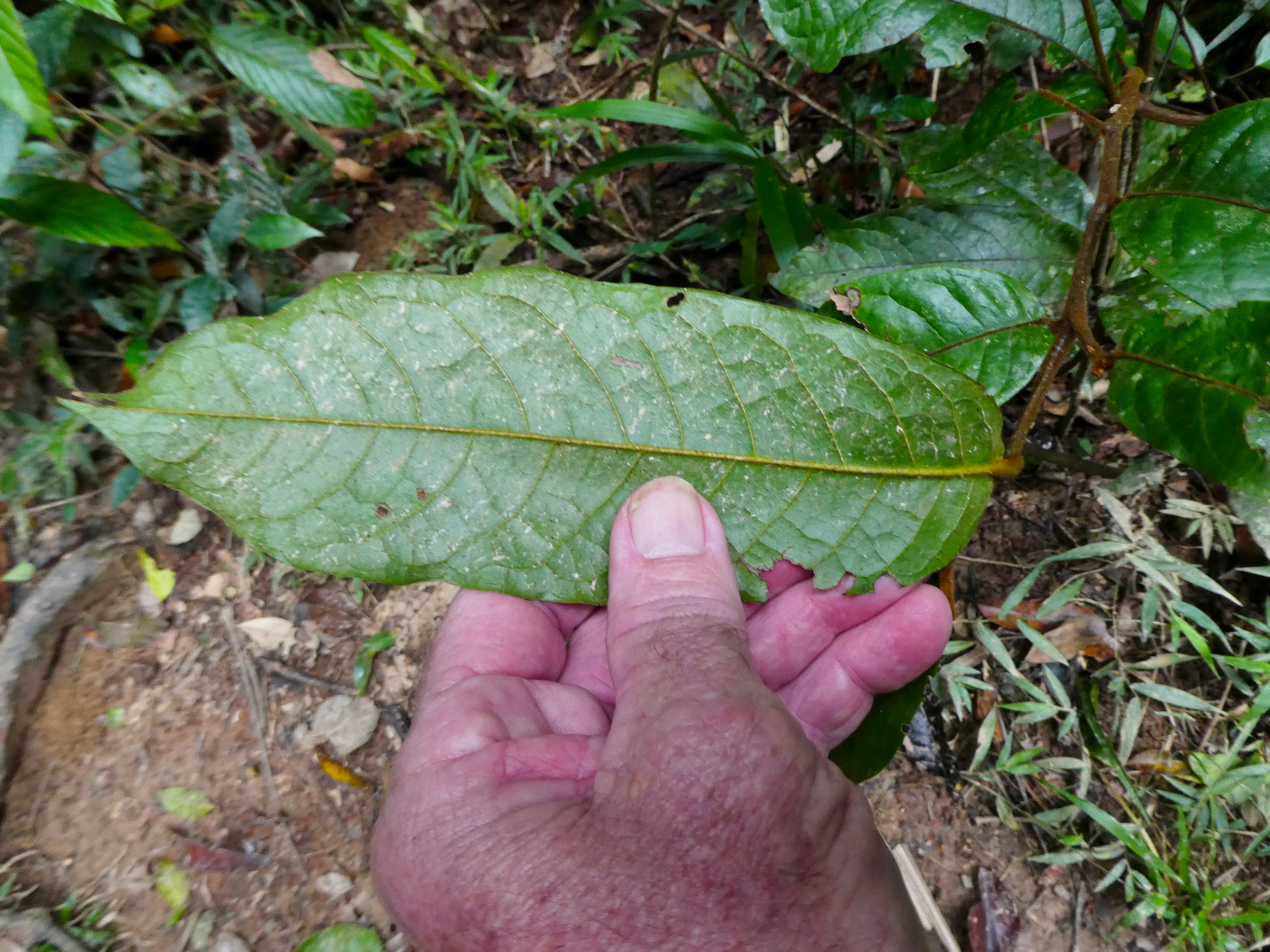
Underside of leaf
