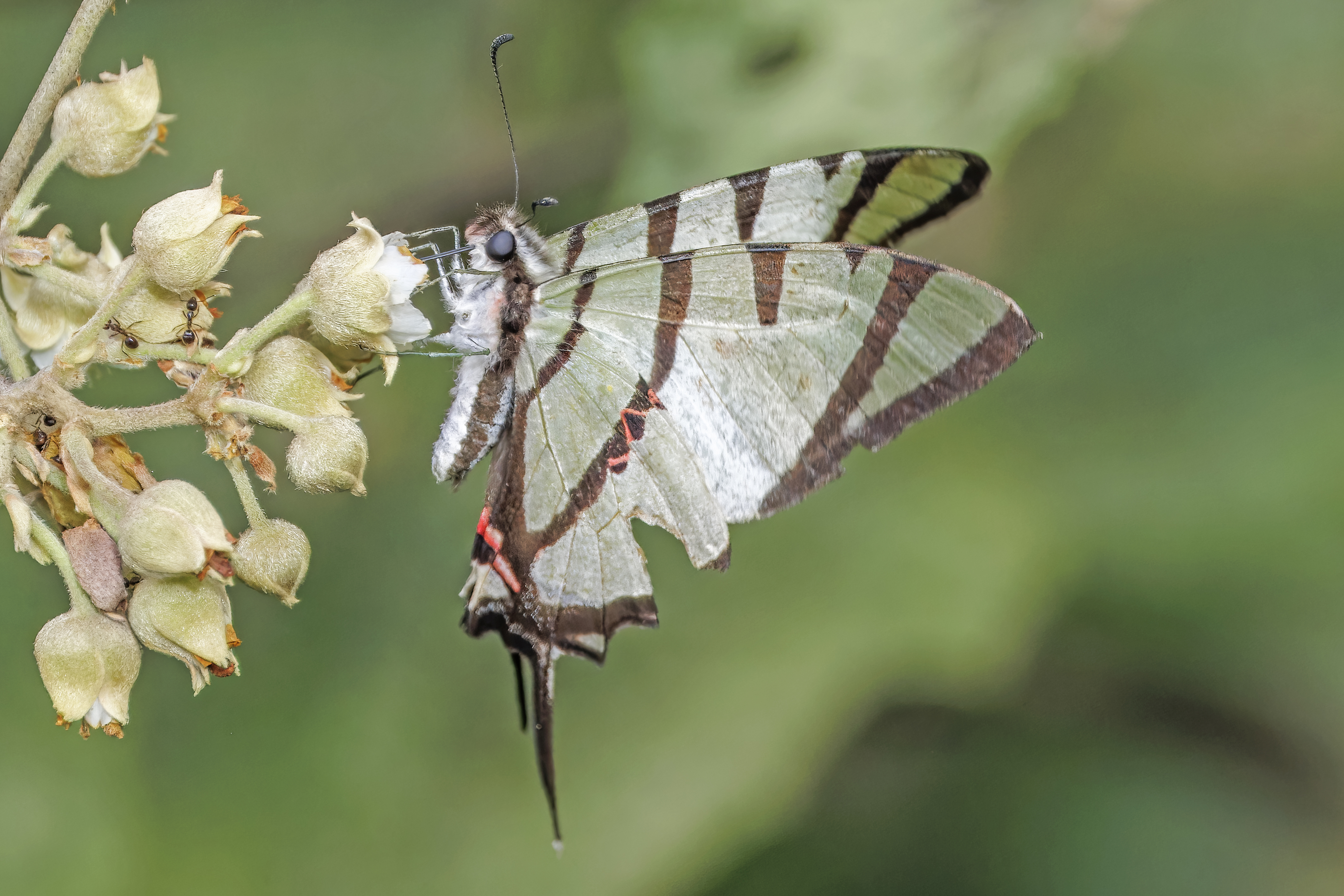
- Graphium agetes agetes, Laos

Scientific classification
- Kingdom: Animalia
- Phylum: Arthropoda
- Class: Insecta
- Order: Lepidoptera
- Family: Papilionidae
- Genus: Graphium
- Species: G. agetes

Binomial name
- Graphium agetes Westwood, 1841

= Graphium agetes =

Species of butterfly

Graphium agetes, the fourbar swordtail, is a widespread species of swallowtail butterfly found in tropical Asia. It is common and not threatened.

== Description ==
Males and females upperside white. Forewing: cell crossed by three comparatively broad, oblique black bands, the innermost produced across interspaces 1 and la to the dorsal margin, the next to vein 1, sometimes a little beyond into interspace 1a, the third to the median vein; these are followed by a triangular costal black spot above the upper apex of the cell; a postdiscal oblique band similar to the others that extends from the costa to just above the tornus, where it joins a broad black terminal edging that lies between the apex of the wing and the tornus; the costal margin edged with a black thread which widens slightly beyond the postdiscal band. The white ground colour in the anterior half of the cell, beyond the apex of the latter to the postdiscal black band, and in the area between the postdiscal and terminal bands, is hyaline (glass like) with a greenish-yellow tinge. Hindwing: a spot at the tornal angle, the anal lobe, tail and terminal margin black; above the tornal spot is a short, comparatively broad, red band edged anteriorly by a fine black line that joins the spot to the black on the anal lobe; superposed on the black of the terminal margin there are some obscure white scalings; a triangular transverse subterminal white spot in interspace 3 and occasionally a sub-terminal short white line in interspace 4; also the anterior edge of the tail at base is touched with white. Seen by transparency from the underside are two convergent transverse black bands, the outer one of which is traversed by short transverse lines of red in interspaces 2, 6, 7 and 8. Underside similar; hindwing with the addition of the two black bands mentioned above, which coalesce above the tornal area. Antennae, head, thorax and abdomen black, the head marked with red, the thorax on the sides with greyish pubescence; abdomen with lateral white stripes; beneath, white.

Karl Jordan in Seitz (page 87) provides a description differentiating agetes from nearby taxa and discussing some forms.

== See also ==
- List of butterflies of India (Papilionidae)

== Gallery ==
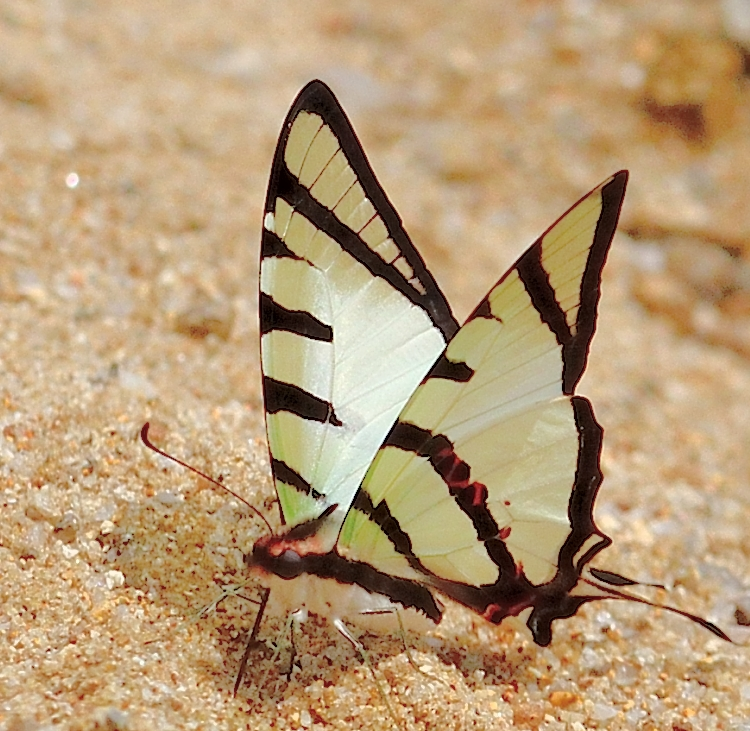
Partly open wings, Fraser's Hill, Malaysia

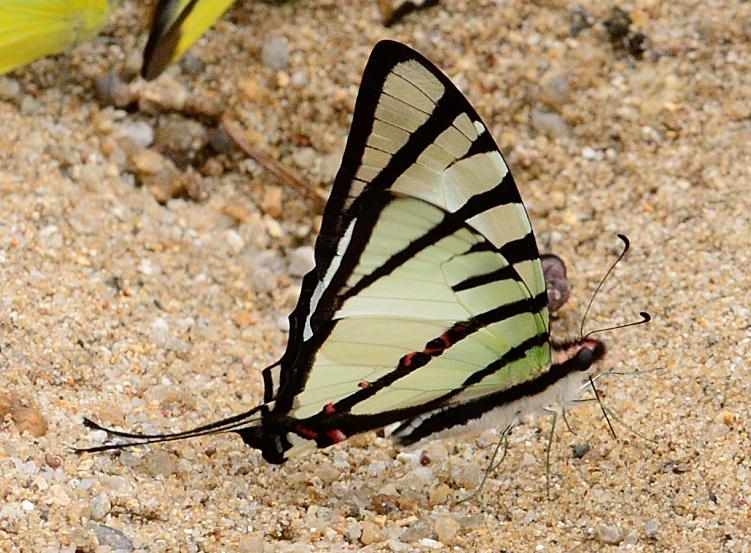
At Fraser's Hill, Malaysia

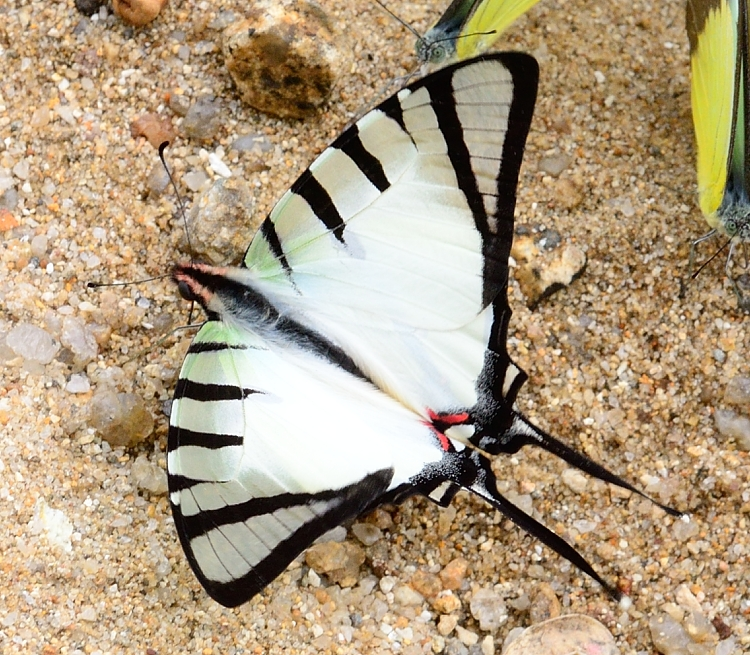
Open wings, Fraser's Hill, Malaysia
