= Laurence Woodward Jessup =

Laurence Woodward Jessup is an Australian botanist born in 1947. Jessup was born in Brisbane, and initially studied architecture at the University of Queensland before taking a Bachelor degree with honours in botany. The standard author abbreviation Jessup is used to indicate this person as the author when citing a botanical name.
