= List of trees of the Andaman Islands =

The Andaman Islands fall within the Indo-Burma biodiversity hotspot. While endemism estimated to be a modest 17%, the islands share about 65% of its tree species with south-west Myanmar. Early explorers like Wilhelm Sulpiz Kurz documented the flora of the region, and Charles Edward Parkinson published a Flora of the Andaman Islands with important tree species of the region. Since then, a number of tree species have been described. A comprehensive checklist of flora of the Andaman and Nicobar Islands has been published by the Botanical Survey of India - a 3-volume flora is currently under preparation of which the first volume was published in 2008.

== List of species ==
This checklist includes trees and other flora listed in Parkinson (1923). It includes most native tree species and some exotic trees species.

| Family | Scientific name | Old name (as per Parkinson 1923) |
|---|---|---|
| Dilleniaceae | Dillenia pilosa | |
| Dilleniaceae | Dillenia scabrella | |
| Dilleniaceae | Dillenia pentagyna | |
| Dilleniaceae | Delima sarmentosa | |
| Magnoliceae | Magnolia andamanica | Talauma andamanica |
| Schisandraceae | Kadsura roxburghiana | |
| Annonaceae | Orophea hexandra | |
| Annonaceae | Orophea polycarpa | |
| Annonaceae | Miliusa tectona | |
| Annonaceae | Polyalthia andamanica | |
| Annonaceae | Maasia glauca | Polyalthia parkinsonii |
| Annonaceae | Polyalthia simiarum | |
| Annonaceae | Goniothalamus macranthus | Melodorum macranthum |
| Annonaceae | Goniothalamus meeboldii | Mitrephora prainii |
| Annonaceae | Sageraea elliptica | |
| Annonaceae | Unona dasymaschala | |
| Annonaceae | Popowia nitida | |
| Annonaceae | Popowia kurzii | |
| Annonaceae | Phaeanthus andamanicus | |
| Annonaceae | Anaxagorea luzonensis | |
| Annonaceae | Artabotrys speciosus | |
| Annonaceae | Oxymitra fornicata | |
| Annonaceae | Uvaria hamiltonii | |
| Annonaceae | Uvaria andamanica | |
| Menispermaceae | Tinospora cordifolia | |
| Menispermaceae | Antitaxis calocarpa | |
| Capparidaceae | Capparis sepiaria | |
| Capparidaceae | Capparis floribunda | |
| Capparidaceae | Capparis ambigua | |
| Capparidaceae | Capparis tenera | |
| Capparidaceae | Capparis horrida | |
| Capparidaceae | Capparis micracantha | |
| Capparidaceae | Alsodeia roxburghii | |
| Capparidaceae | Alsodeia bengalensis | |
| Flacourtiaceae | Scolopia crenata | |
| Flacourtiaceae | Ryparosa kurzii | |
| Euphorbiaceae | Drypetes longifolia | |
| Polygalaceae | Xanthophyllum andamanicum | |
| Hypericaceae | Cratoxylon formosum | |
| Calophyllaceae | Calophyllum inophyllum | |
| Calophyllaceae | Calophyllum spectabile | |
| Calophyllaceae | Calophyllum amoenum | |
| Calophyllaceae | Mesua ferrea | |
| Calophyllaceae | Mesua manii | Kayea manii |
| Clusiaceae | Garcinia mangostana | |
| Clusiaceae | Garcinia xanthochymus | |
| Clusiaceae | Garcinia andamanica | |
| Clusiaceae | Garcinia cowa | |
| Clusiaceae | Garcinia speciosa | |
| Clusiaceae | Garcinia microstigma | |
| Clusiaceae | Garcinia kydia | |
| Clusiaceae | Garcinia cadelliana | |
| Pentaphylacaceae | Ternstroemia penangiana | |
| Dipterocarpaceae | Dipterocarpus grandiflorus | Dipterocarpus griffithii |
| Dipterocarpaceae | Dipterocarpus gracilis | Dipterocarpus turbinatus var. andamanicus |
| Dipterocarpaceae | Dipterocarpus kerrii | |
| Dipterocarpaceae | Dipterocarpus alatus | Dipterocarpus incanus |
| Dipterocarpaceae | Dipterocarpus costatus | |
| Dipterocarpaceae | Hopea odorata | |
| Dipterocarpaceae | Hopea andamanica / sp | |
| Ancistrocladaceae | Ancistrocladus extensus | |
| Ancistrocladaceae | Ancistrocladus attenuatus | |
| Malvaceae | Hibiscus tiliaceus | |
| Malvaceae | Hibiscus abelmoschus | |
| Malvaceae | Hibiscus scandens | |
| Malvaceae | Thespesia populnea | |
| Malvaceae | Eriodendron anfractuosum | |
| Malvaceae | Bombax insigne | |
| Malvaceae | Pterygota alata | Sterculia alata |
| Malvaceae | Pterocymbium tinctorium | Sterculia campanulata |
| Malvaceae | Sterculia parviflora | |
| Malvaceae | Sterculia rubiginosa | |
| Malvaceae | Sterculia villosa | |
| Malvaceae | Sterculia colorata | |
| Malvaceae | Heritiera littoralis | |
| Malvaceae | Pterospermum aceroides | |
| Malvaceae | Leptonychia glabra | |
| Malvaceae | Berrya ammonilla | |
| Malvaceae | Grewia calophylla | |
| Malvaceae | Grewia laevigata | |
| Malvaceae | Grewia microcos | |
| Malvaceae | Brownlowia lanceolata | |
| Malvaceae | Elaeocarpus aristatus | |
| Malvaceae | Elaeocarpus robustus | |
| Rutaceae | Acronychia laurifolia | |
| Rutaceae | Atalantia monophylla | |
| Rutaceae | Evodia glabra | |
| Rutaceae | Limonia alata | |
| Rutaceae | Zanthoxylum budrunga | |
| Rutaceae | Zanthoxylum andamanicum | |
| Rutaceae | Micromelum pubescens | |
| Rutaceae | Murraya exotica | |
| Rutaceae | Glycosmis pentaphylla | |
| Simaroubaceae | Samadera lucida | |
| Simaroubaceae | Picrasma javanica | |
| Simaroubaceae | Ailanthus kurzii | |
| Ochnaceae | Ochna wallichii | |
| Ochnaceae | Gomphia hookeriii | |
| Burseraceae | Garuga pinnata | |
| Burseraceae | Canarium euphyllum | |
| Burseraceae | Canarium coccineo-bracteatum | |
| Burseraceae | Canarium denticulatum | Canarium manii |
| Burseraceae | Ganophyllum falcatum | |
| Meliaceae | Sandoricum indicum | |
| Meliaceae | Carapa moluccensis | |
| Meliaceae | Carapa obovata | |
| Meliaceae | Chukrasia tabularis | |
| Meliaceae | Chisocheton grandiflorus | |
| Meliaceae | Dysoxylum arborescens | |
| Meliaceae | Dysoxylum thyrsoideum | |
| Meliaceae | Dysoxylum andamanicum | |
| Meliaceae | Aglaia ganggo | |
| Meliaceae | Aglaia glaucescens | |
| Meliaceae | Aglaia fusca | |
| Meliaceae | Aglaia andamanica | |
| Meliaceae | Walsura candollei | |
| Meliaceae | Walsura hypoleuca | |
| Meliaceae | Walsura robusta | |
| Meliaceae | Amoora wallichii | |
| Meliaceae | Amoora rohituka | |
| Meliaceae | Azadirachta indica | |
| Dichapetalaceae | Dichapetalum gelonioides subsp. andamanicum | Chailletia andamanica |
| Olacaceae | Ximenia americana | |
| Icacinaceae | Gomphandra andamanica | |
| Celastraceae | Glyptopetalum calocarpum | |
| Celastraceae | Elaeodendron subrotundum | |
| Celastraceae | Kurrimia pulcherrima | |
| Sapindaceae | Pometia pinnata | |
| Sapindaceae | Harpullia cupanioides | |
| Sapindaceae | Erioglossum rubiginosum | |
| Sapindaceae | Mischocarpus sundaicus | |
| Sapindaceae | Arytera littoralis | |
| Sapindaceae | Lepisanthus andamanica | |
| Sapindaceae | Nephelium sp | |
| Anacardiaceae | Mangifera andamanica | |
| Anacardiaceae | Mangifera sylvatica | |
| Anacardiaceae | Buchanania platyneura | |
| Anacardiaceae | Semecarpus prainii | |
| Anacardiaceae | Semecarpus kurzii | |
| Anacardiaceae | Drimycarpus racemosus | |
| Anacardiaceae | Anacardium occidentale | |
| Anacardiaceae | Bouea burmanica | |
| Anacardiaceae | Spondias mangifera | |
| Anacardiaceae | Odina/lannea wodier/coromandelia | |
| Anacardiaceae | Parishia insignis | |
| Anacardiaceae | Dracantomelum mangiferum | |
| Connaraceae | Ellipanthus calophyllus | |
| Fabaceae | Desmodium umbellatum | |
| Fabaceae | Sophora tomentosa | |
| Fabaceae | Erythrina indica | |
| Fabaceae | Pongamia glabra | |
| Fabaceae | Pterocarpus dalbergioides | |
| Fabaceae | Cynometra ramiflora | |
| Fabaceae | Afzelia bijuga | |
| Fabaceae | Cassia nodosa | |
| Fabaceae | Peltophorum ferrugineum | |
| Fabaceae | Adenanthera pavonina | |
| Fabaceae | Albizzia stipulata | |
| Fabaceae | Albizzia lebbek | |
| Fabaceae | Albizzia procera | |
| Fabaceae | Pithecelobium angulatum | |
| Rosaceae | Prunus martabanica | |
| Rosaceae | Pygeum acuminatum | |
| Escalloniaceae | Polyosma integrifolia | |
| Rhizophoraceae | Rhizophora mucronata | |
| Rhizophoraceae | Rhizophora conjugata | |
| Rhizophoraceae | Bruguiera gymnorhiza | |
| Rhizophoraceae | Bruguiera parviflora | |
| Rhizophoraceae | Ceriops candolleana | |
| Rhizophoraceae | Carallia lucida | |
| Combretaceae | Terminalia procera | |
| Combretaceae | Terminalia catappa | |
| Combretaceae | Terminalia bialata | |
| Combretaceae | Terminalia manii | |
| Combretaceae | Lumnitzera coccinea | |
| Combretaceae | Lumnitzera racemosa | |
| Combretaceae | Gyrocarpus americanus | |
| Myrtaceae | Eugenia javanica | |
| Myrtaceae | Eugenia manii | |
| Myrtaceae | Eugenia kurzii | |
| Myrtaceae | Eugenia acuminatissima | |
| Myrtaceae | Eugenia claviflora | |
| Myrtaceae | Eugenia jambolana | |
| Myrtaceae | Eugenia andamanica | |
| Myrtaceae | Eugenia grata | |
| Myrtaceae | Eugenia cymosa | |
| Myrtaceae | Barringtonia speciosa | |
| Myrtaceae | Barringtonia racemosa | |
| Myrtaceae | Planchonia andamanica | |
| Myrtaceae | Careya valida | |
| Melastomataceae | Memecylon caeruleum | |
| Melastomataceae | Memecylon edule | |
| Melastomataceae | Memecylon andamanicum | |
| Melastomataceae | Memecylon pauciflorum | |
| Melastomataceae | Memecylon elegans | |
| Lythraceae | Pemphis acidula | |
| Lythraceae | Sonneratia acida | |
| Lythraceae | Sonneratia alba | |
| Lythraceae | Lagerstroemia hypoleuca | |
| Lythraceae | Duabanga sonneratioides | |
| Lythraceae | Crypteronia paniculata | |
| Salicaceae | Casearia andamanica | |
| Tetramelaceae | Tetrameles nudiflora | |
| Araliaceae | Brassaiopsis palmata | |
| Araliaceae | Heteropanax fragrans | |
| Araliaceae | Arthrophyllum diversifoium | |
| Rubiaceae | Stephegyne diversifolia | |
| Rubiaceae | Anthocephalus cadamba | |
| Rubiaceae | Nauclea gageana | |
| Rubiaceae | Nauclea pururascens | |
| Rubiaceae | Morinda citrifolia | |
| Rubiaceae | Uncaria pedicellata | |
| Rubiaceae | Mussaenda macrophylla | |
| Rubiaceae | Webera kurzii | |
| Rubiaceae | Ixora brunnescens | |
| Rubiaceae | Ixora finlaysoniana | |
| Rubiaceae | Guettarda speciosa | |
| Rubiaceae | Scyphiphora hydrophyllaceae | |
| Rubiaceae | Randia densiflora | |
| Rubiaceae | Randia exaltata | |
| Rubiaceae | Canthium glabrum | |
| Rubiaceae | Timonius jambosella | |
| Rubiaceae | Gardenia coronaria | |
| Myrsinaceae | Ardisia humilis | |
| Myrsinaceae | Ardisia andamanica | |
| Myrsinaceae | Aegiceras majus | |
| Myrsinaceae | Maesa ramentaceae | |
| Sapotaceae | Mimosops littoralis | |
| Sapotaceae | Mimosops elengi | |
| Sapotaceae | Bassia butyraceae | |
| Sapotaceae | Planchonella longipetiolata | Sideroxylon longipetiolatum |
| Sapotaceae | Sideroxylon ferrugineum | |
| Ebenaceae | Diospyros kurzii | |
| Ebenaceae | Diospyros oocarpa | |
| Ebenaceae | Diospyros pyrhocarpa | |
| Ebenaceae | Diospyros undulata | |
| Ebenaceae | Diospyros pilosula | |
| Ebenaceae | Diospyros montana | |
| Symplocaceae | Symplocos racemosa | |
| Oleaceae | Chionanthus parkinsonii | Linociera parkinsonii |
| Oleaceae | Chionanthus mala-elengi subsp. terniflorus | Linociera terniflora |
| Apocynaceae | Ochrosia borbonica | |
| Apocynaceae | Alstonia kurzii | |
| Apocynaceae | Hunteria corymbosa | |
| Apocynaceae | Tabernaemontana crispa | |
| Apocynaceae | Wrightia tomentosa | |
| Apocynaceae | Cerbera odallam | |
| Loganiaceae | Fagraea morindaefolia | |
| Boraginaceae | Cordia subcordata | |
| Boraginaceae | Cordia grandis | |
| Boraginaceae | Ehretia laevis | |
| Boraginaceae | Tournefortia argentea | |
| Bignoniaceae | Dolichandrone rheedii | |
| Bignoniaceae | Heterophragma adenophyllum | |
| Bignoniaceae | Pajanella rheedii | |
| Bignoniaceae | Oroxylum indicum | |
| Verbenaceae | Premna integrifolia | |
| Verbenaceae | Avicennia officinalis | |
| Verbenaceae | Gmelina arborea | |
| Verbenaceae | Vitex diversifolia | |
| Verbenaceae | Vitex glabrata | |
| Nyctaginaceae | Pisonia umbellifera | Pisonia excelsa |
| Myristicaceae | Knema andamanica | Myristica glaucescens |
| Myristicaceae | Myristica andamanica | |
| Myristicaceae | Endocomia macrocoma var. prainii | Myristica prainii |
| Myristicaceae | Horsfieldia irya | Myristica irya |
| Myristicaceae | Horsfieldia glabra | Myristica glabra |
| Lauraceae | Cinnamomum obtusifolium | |
| Lauraceae | Litsea chinensis | |
| Lauraceae | Litsea leiantha | |
| Lauraceae | Litsea panamonja | |
| Lauraceae | Litsea kurzii | |
| Lauraceae | Cryptocarya andamanica | |
| Lauraceae | Cryptocarya ferrarsi | |
| Lauraceae | Cryptocarya caesia | |
| Lauraceae | Cryptocarya amygdalina | |
| Lauraceae | Dehaasia kurzii | |
| Hernandiaceae | Hernandia peltata | |
| Proteaceae | Helicia excelsa | |
| Opiliaceae | Champereia manillana | |
| Euphorbiaceae | Euphorbia trigona | |
| Euphorbiaceae | Euphorbia epiphylloides | |
| Euphorbiaceae | Phyllanthus columnaris | |
| Euphorbiaceae | Bridelia tomentosa | |
| Euphorbiaceae | Glochidion calocarpum | |
| Euphorbiaceae | Glochidion andamanicum | |
| Euphorbiaceae | Glochidion hirsutum | |
| Euphorbiaceae | Cyclostemon assamicus | |
| Euphorbiaceae | Cyclostemon macrophyllus | |
| Euphorbiaceae | Gelonium multiflorum | |
| Euphorbiaceae | Gelonium bifarium | |
| Euphorbiaceae | Cliesanthus myrianthus | |
| Euphorbiaceae | Aporosa villosula | |
| Euphorbiaceae | Macaranga andamanica | |
| Euphorbiaceae | Macaranga indica | |
| Euphorbiaceae | Macaranga tanarius | |
| Euphorbiaceae | Endospermum malaccense | |
| Euphorbiaceae | Baccaurea sapida | |
| Euphorbiaceae | Sapium baccatum | |
| Euphorbiaceae | Croton argyratus | |
| Euphorbiaceae | Mallotus acuminatus | |
| Euphorbiaceae | Mallotus philippinensis | |
| Euphorbiaceae | Mallotus andamanicus | |
| Euphorbiaceae | Mallotus kurzii | |
| Euphorbiaceae | Excoecaria agallocha | |
| Euphorbiaceae | Hemicyclia andamanica | |
| Euphorbiaceae | Cleidion javanicum | |
| Euphorbiaceae | Cleidion nitidum | |
| Euphorbiaceae | Homonoia riparia | |
| Euphorbiaceae | Claoxylon indicum | |
| Euphorbiaceae | Bischofia javanica | |
| Cannabaceae | Celtis wightii | |
| Cannabaceae | Celtis cinnamomea | |
| Cannabaceae | Trema amboinensis | |
| Cannabaceae | Gironniera subaequalis | |
| Cannabaceae | Gironniera luidca | |
| Moraceae | Ficus hispida | |
| Moraceae | Ficus brevicuspis | |
| Moraceae | Ficus rumphfii | |
| Moraceae | Ficus glomerata | |
| Moraceae | Ficus variegata | |
| Moraceae | Ficus benjamina | |
| Moraceae | Ficus retusa | |
| Moraceae | Ficus glabella | |
| Moraceae | Ficus gibbosa | |
| Moraceae | Ficus scandens | |
| Moraceae | Ficus obtusifolia | |
| Moraceae | Ficus indica | |
| Moraceae | Ficus infectoria | |
| Moraceae | Ficus altissima | |
| Moraceae | Ficus ramentacea | |
| Moraceae | Ficus callosa | |
| Moraceae | Ficus nervosa | |
| Moraceae | Ficus glaberrima | |
| Moraceae | Artocarpus gomeziana | |
| Moraceae | Artocarpus lakoocha | |
| Moraceae | Artocarpus chaplasha | |
| Moraceae | Antiaris toxicaria | |
| Moraceae | Morus laevigata | |
| Moraceae | Streblus asper | |
| Moraceae | Phyllochlamys spinosa | |
| Moraceae | Plecospermum andamanicum | |
| Urticaceae | Pipturus veluntinus | |
| Casuarinaceae | Casuarina equisetifolia | |
| Podocarpaceae | Podocarpus neerifolia | |
| Cycadaceae | Cycas rumphfii | |
| Marantaceae | Donax canniformis | Clinogyne grandis |
| Flagellariaceae | Flagellaria indica | |
| Pandanaceae | Pandanus tectorius | |
| Pandanaceae | Pandanus andamanensium | |
| Pandanaceae | Pandanus leram | |
| Pandanaceae | Freycinetia sp | |
| Asparagaceae | Dracaena angustifolia | |
| Asparagaceae | Dracaena spicata | |
| Arecaceae | Phoenix paludosa | |
| Arecaceae | Nipa fruticans | |
| Arecaceae | Pinanga manii | |
| Arecaceae | Pinanga kuhlii | |
| Arecaceae | Calamus andamanicus | |
| Arecaceae | Calamus pseudorivalis | |
| Arecaceae | Calamus palustris | |
| Arecaceae | Calamus longisetus | |
| Arecaceae | Calamus viminalis | |
| Arecaceae | Daemonorops kurzianus | |
| Arecaceae | Daemonorops manii | |
| Arecaceae | Korthalasia laciniosa | |
| Arecaceae | Caryota mitis | |
| Arecaceae | Corypha umbraculifera | |
| Arecaceae | Licuala peltata | |
| Arecaceae | Licuala spinosa | |
| Poaceae | Phragmites karka | |
| Poaceae | Tripidium arundinaceum (syn. Saccharum arundinaceum) | |
| Poaceae | Thysanolaena agrostis | |
| Poaceae | Oxytenanthera nigrociliata | |
| Poaceae | Bambusa lineata | |
| Poaceae | Bambusa schizostachyoides | |
| Poaceae | Schizostachyum rogersii | |
| Poaceae | Dinochloa andamanica | |

== See also ==
- Kwangtung Island Wildlife Sanctuary
