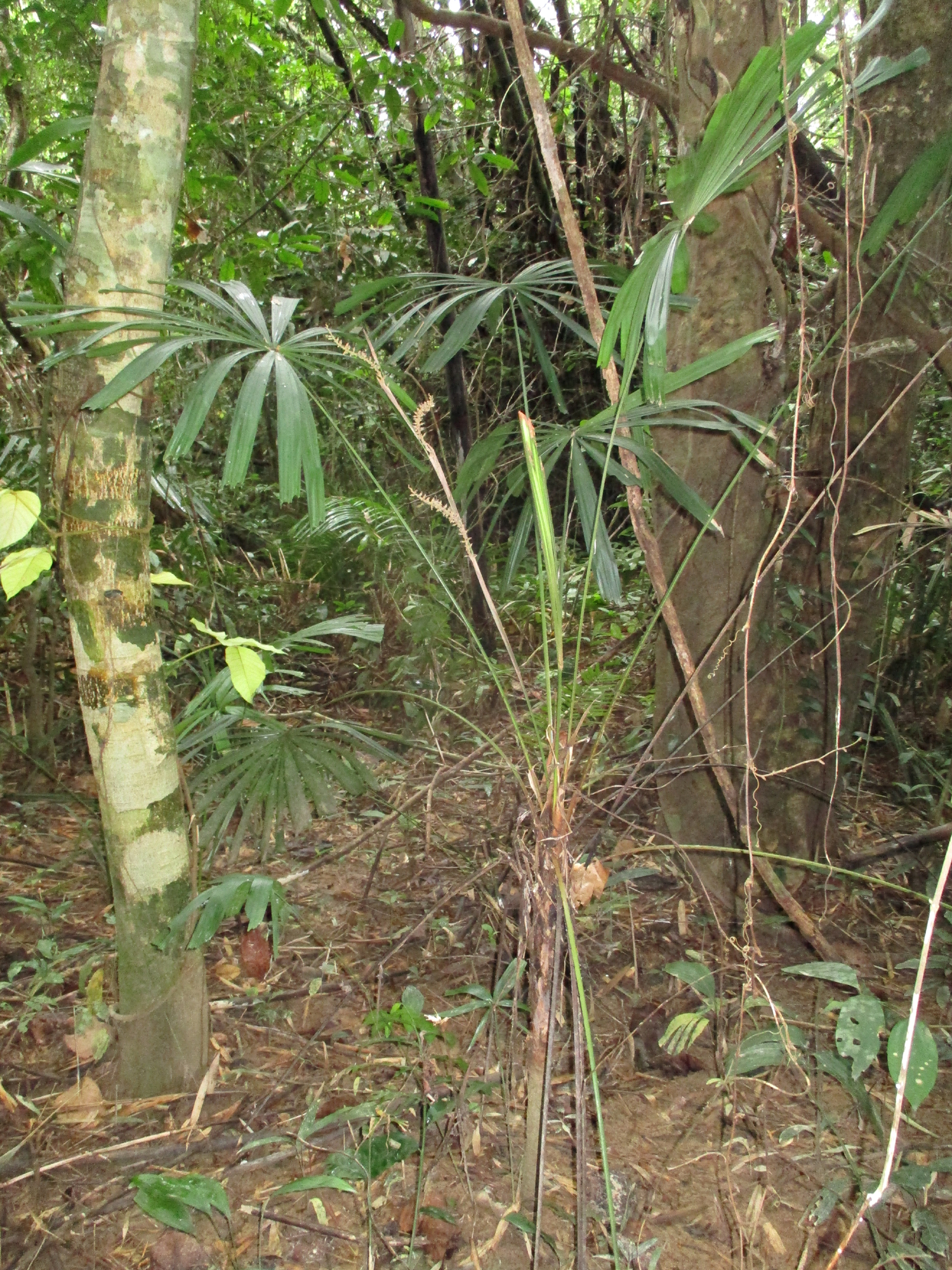
- Specimen photographed in Cát Tiên National Park (Roy Bateman)

Scientific classification
- Kingdom: Plantae
- Clade: Tracheophytes
- Clade: Angiosperms
- Clade: Monocots
- Clade: Commelinids
- Order: Arecales
- Family: Arecaceae
- Tribe: Trachycarpeae
- Genus: Licuala
- Species: L. cattienensis

Binomial name
- Licuala cattienensis Henderson A, Ban NK, Dung NQ (2008)

= Licuala cattienensis =

Species of palm

Licuala cattienensis, is a small fan palm, endemic to southern Vietnam. The type locality is in Cát Tiên National Park in Đồng Nai Province, growing in seasonal tropical forest in flat areas near rivers at low elevations. It is recognisable by being much smaller (<2m) and single-stemmed, in comparison the larger L. spinosa, which is common in the Park and grows in grows in clumps.

The local name for fan palms is mật cật; the authors also cite lá toi. No uses have been recorded.

== Description ==
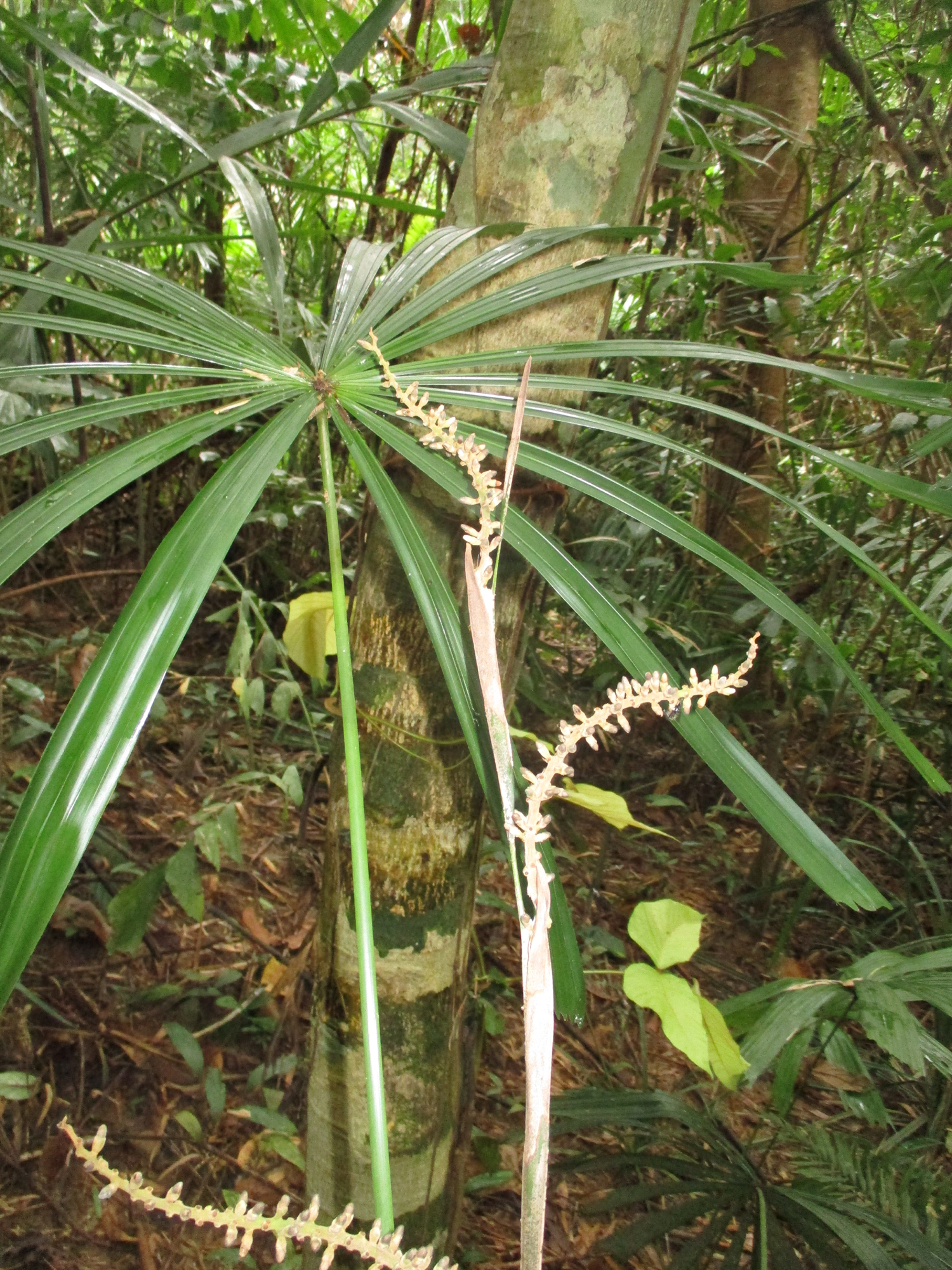
Inflorescence (as above)

The plants have solitary stems (but sometimes with basal shoots), maximum: 2 m tall and 40 mm in diameter. There are typically 18 leaves; leaf sheaths are not known in their entirety, they are extended above the petioles into "ocreas" (extensions of the leaf sheath), which are 200 mm long. Petioles are 1.36 m long, 4 mm wide at the apices, with widely spaced, recurved, thorns. Leaf blades are approximately 800 mm wide, split into 12 segments, these with straight sides; middle segment not wider than the others (and not split with no petiolules) 465 mm long, 65 mm wide at the apex; indentations leading to adaxial folds 5 mm deep, those leading to abaxial folds 3 mm deep, indentations deeper on lateral segments.

Plants are monoecious: with inflorescences up to 1.2 m long, erect among the leaves; prophylls and peduncles are not known. The rachis is 0.5 m long, with 2–4 partial spiky inflorescences, subtended by tubular bracts; rachillae 1 on each partial inflorescence, 160–220 mm long, 1.5–2 mm diameter, covered with scattered, very short, glandular hairs, with prominent floral stalks giving the rachillae a bumpy appearance. Flowers are not known to date, borne in pairs.

Fruits are 8 mm long, 6 mm diam., globose to ellipsoid, with the perianth appressed to base of the fruit, ripening from green to yellow to bright red.

Note: In Gagnepain and Conrard the plant would key-out to Licuala radula. L. cattienensis differs from the latter in its segments which have straight sides (versus curved) and rachillae which are not zigzag and are covered with scattered, very short, glandular hairs (versus zigzag and densely covered with golden brown hairs). It also differs in habitat: L. radula occurs on steep slopes in montane forest more than 500 km to the north, in Thừa Thiên-Hue Province.
