= Licuala dasyantha =

Conservation status
- Vulnerable (IUCN 3.1)

Scientific classification
- Kingdom: Plantae
- Clade: Tracheophytes
- Clade: Angiosperms
- Clade: Monocots
- Clade: Commelinids
- Order: Arecales
- Family: Arecaceae
- Tribe: Trachycarpeae
- Genus: Licuala
- Species: L. dasyantha

Binomial name
- Licuala dasyantha Burret

Species of palm

Licuala dasyantha is a species of palm tree in the family Arecaceae.

== Distribution ==
Licuala dasyantha is found only in and endemic to China. Its natural habitat is subtropical or tropical moist lowland forests.

It is a Vulnerable species threatened by habitat loss.
