= Walsura sarawakensis =

Conservation status
- Critically Endangered (IUCN 3.1)

Scientific classification
- Kingdom: Plantae
- Clade: Tracheophytes
- Clade: Angiosperms
- Clade: Eudicots
- Clade: Rosids
- Order: Sapindales
- Family: Meliaceae
- Genus: Walsura
- Species: W. sarawakensis

Binomial name
- Walsura sarawakensis T.Clark

Species of tree in the family Meliaceae

Walsura sarawakensis is a tree in the family Meliaceae. It is named for Sarawak in Borneo.

== Description ==
Walsura sarawakensis grows as a small tree up to 6 metres (20 ft) tall. The leaves are lanceolate and measure up to 36 cm (14 in) long. The inflorescences feature green flowers. The ellipsoid fruits are purplish brown.

== Distribution and habitat ==
Walsura sarawakensis is endemic to Borneo, where it is confined to the Tatau District of Sarawak. Its habitat is lowland forests to elevations of 300 m (1,000 ft).

== Conservation ==
Walsura sarawakensis has been assessed as critically endangered on the IUCN Red List. It is mainly threatened by logging and conversion of its habitat for tree plantations.
