= Walsura monophylla =

Conservation status
- Endangered (IUCN 3.1)

Scientific classification
- Kingdom: Plantae
- Clade: Tracheophytes
- Clade: Angiosperms
- Clade: Eudicots
- Clade: Rosids
- Order: Sapindales
- Family: Meliaceae
- Genus: Walsura
- Species: W. monophylla

Binomial name
- Walsura monophylla Elmer ex Merr.

Species of plant

Walsura monophylla is a plant in the family Meliaceae, native to the Philippines.

== Description ==
Walsura monophylla grows as a shrub or tree up to 10 metres (30 ft) tall. The species can absorb nickel in high concentrations from the ultramafic soils in its habitat.

== Distribution and habitat ==
Walsura monophylla is endemic to the Philippines, where it is confined to Palawan. Its habitat is in woodlands, on ultramafic soils, at elevations of around 75 m (200 ft).

== Conservation ==
Walsura monophylla has been assessed as endangered on the IUCN Red List. It is threatened by conversion of its habitat for plantations, agriculture and urban development. It is also threatened by logging for its timber and by mining operations in its habitat.
