= Walsura dehiscens =

Scientific classification
- Kingdom: Plantae
- Clade: Tracheophytes
- Clade: Angiosperms
- Clade: Eudicots
- Clade: Rosids
- Order: Sapindales
- Family: Meliaceae
- Genus: Walsura
- Species: W. dehiscens

Binomial name
- Walsura dehiscens T.Clark

Species of tree

Walsura dehiscens is a tree in the family Meliaceae. The specific epithet dehiscens means 'splitting open', referring to the fruit.

== Description ==
Walsura dehiscens grows up to 9 metres (30 ft) tall, occasionally to 13 m (40 ft). The smooth bark is grey. The leaves measure up to 16 cm (6 in) long. The inflorescences are in thyrses. The immature fruits are winged.

== Distribution and habitat ==
Walsura dehiscens is endemic to Borneo. Its habitat is hill and lowland forests to elevations of about 1,000 m (3,300 ft).
