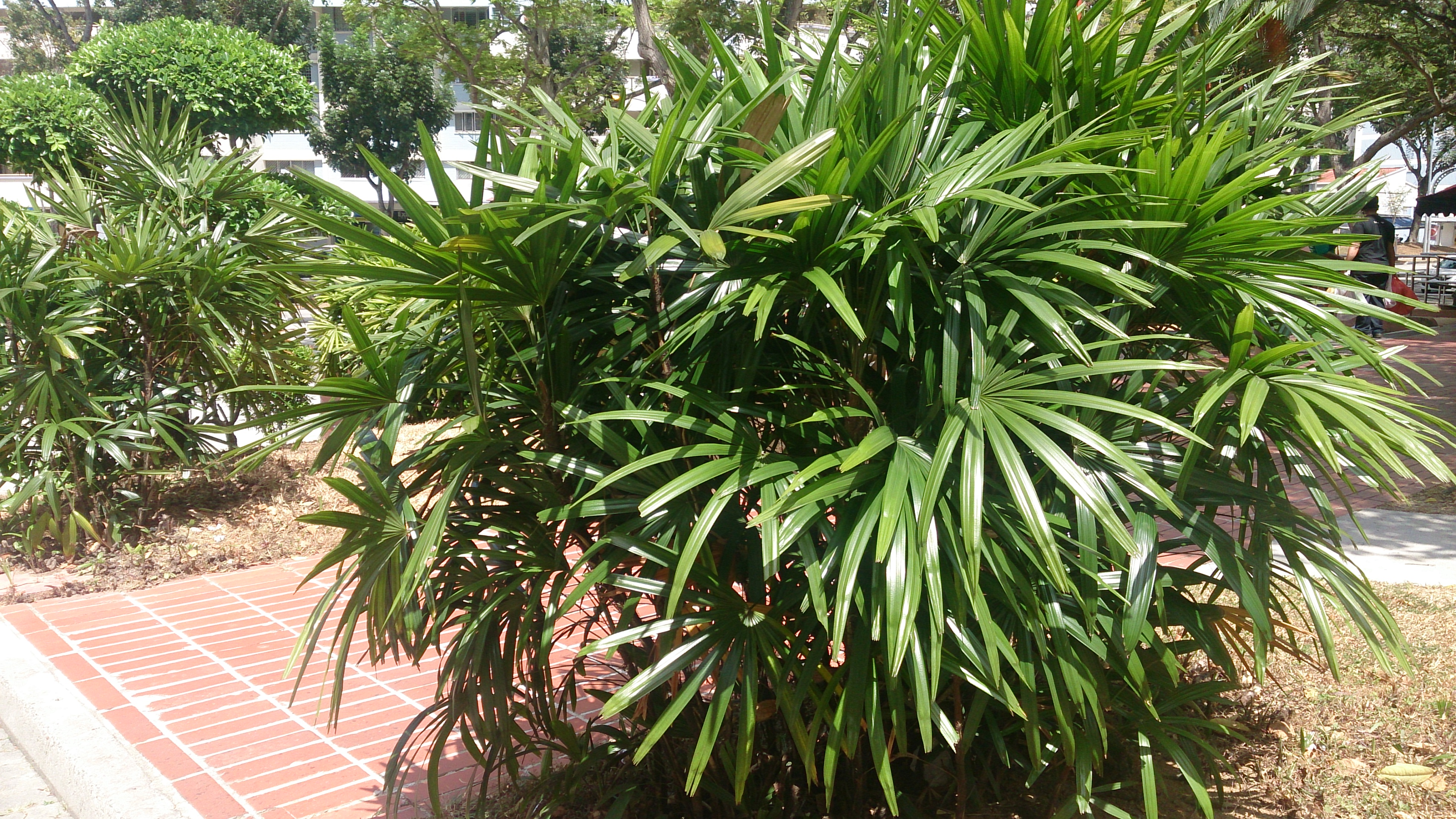

Scientific classification
- Kingdom: Plantae
- Clade: Tracheophytes
- Clade: Angiosperms
- Clade: Monocots
- Clade: Commelinids
- Order: Arecales
- Family: Arecaceae
- Tribe: Trachycarpeae
- Genus: Licuala
- Species: L. ferruginea

Binomial name
- Licuala ferruginea Becc.

= Licuala ferruginea =

Species of palm

Licuala ferruginea is a species of palm tree from the genus Licuala. It is found in Singapore, including in the Bukit Timah Nature Reserve. It is also found in Peninsular Malaysia. It is a small palm with a short stem. It has between 10 and 13 leaflets. The central leaflet is the longest and can grow to up to one meter long. The flowers have hairy ovaries. The fruits are pink when young and black when mature.
