= Walsura gardneri =

Conservation status
- Critically Endangered (IUCN 2.3)

Scientific classification
- Kingdom: Plantae
- Clade: Tracheophytes
- Clade: Angiosperms
- Clade: Eudicots
- Clade: Rosids
- Order: Sapindales
- Family: Meliaceae
- Genus: Walsura
- Species: W. gardneri

Binomial name
- Walsura gardneri Thwaites

Species of flowering plant

Walsura gardneri is a species of plant in the family Meliaceae. It is endemic to Sri Lanka.
