= Walsura pinnata =

Scientific classification
- Kingdom: Plantae
- Clade: Tracheophytes
- Clade: Angiosperms
- Clade: Eudicots
- Clade: Rosids
- Order: Sapindales
- Family: Meliaceae
- Genus: Walsura
- Species: W. pinnata

Binomial name
- Walsura pinnata Hassk.

Synonyms
- List: Heynea cochinchinensis Baill.; Napeodendron altissimum Ridl.; Walsura angulata Craib; Walsura cochinchinensis (Baill.) Harms; Walsura elata Pierre; Walsura hypoleuca Kurz; Walsura neurodes Hiern; Walsura yunnanensis C.Y.Wu

Species of tree

Walsura pinnata is a tree in the family Meliaceae. The specific epithet pinnata is from the Latin meaning 'feather-like', referring to the leaves.

== Description ==
Walsura pinnata grows up to 37 metres (120 ft) tall with a trunk diameter of up to 38 centimetres (15 in). The bark is smooth and pale. The fruits are reddish when fresh, round to ovoid and measure up to 2.8 cm (1 in) in diameter.

== Distribution and habitat ==
Walsura pinnata grows naturally in southern China, Indochina and Malesia. Its habitat is lowland tropical forest.
