= Walsura decipiens =

Conservation status
- Vulnerable (IUCN 3.1)

Scientific classification
- Kingdom: Plantae
- Clade: Tracheophytes
- Clade: Angiosperms
- Clade: Eudicots
- Clade: Rosids
- Order: Sapindales
- Family: Meliaceae
- Genus: Walsura
- Species: W. decipiens

Binomial name
- Walsura decipiens Mabb.

Species of tree

Walsura decipiens is a tree in the family Meliaceae. The specific epithet decipiens means 'deceiving', referring to how the species has been mistaken for species in other plant families.

== Description ==
Walsura decipiens grows as a tree up to 28 metres (90 ft) tall, with a bole height of up to 6 m (20 ft) and a diameter of up to 30 cm (12 in). The red-brown bark is scaly. The leaves are ovate and measure up to 14.5 cm (6 in) long.

== Distribution and habitat ==
Walsura decipiens is endemic to Borneo. Its habitat is lowland forests to elevations of 150 m (500 ft).

== Conservation ==
Walsura decipiens has been assessed as vulnerable on the IUCN Red List. It is mainly threatened by conversion of its habitat for plantations and agriculture. The species is present in the Danum Valley Forest Reserve in Sabah, where it is afforded a level of protection.
