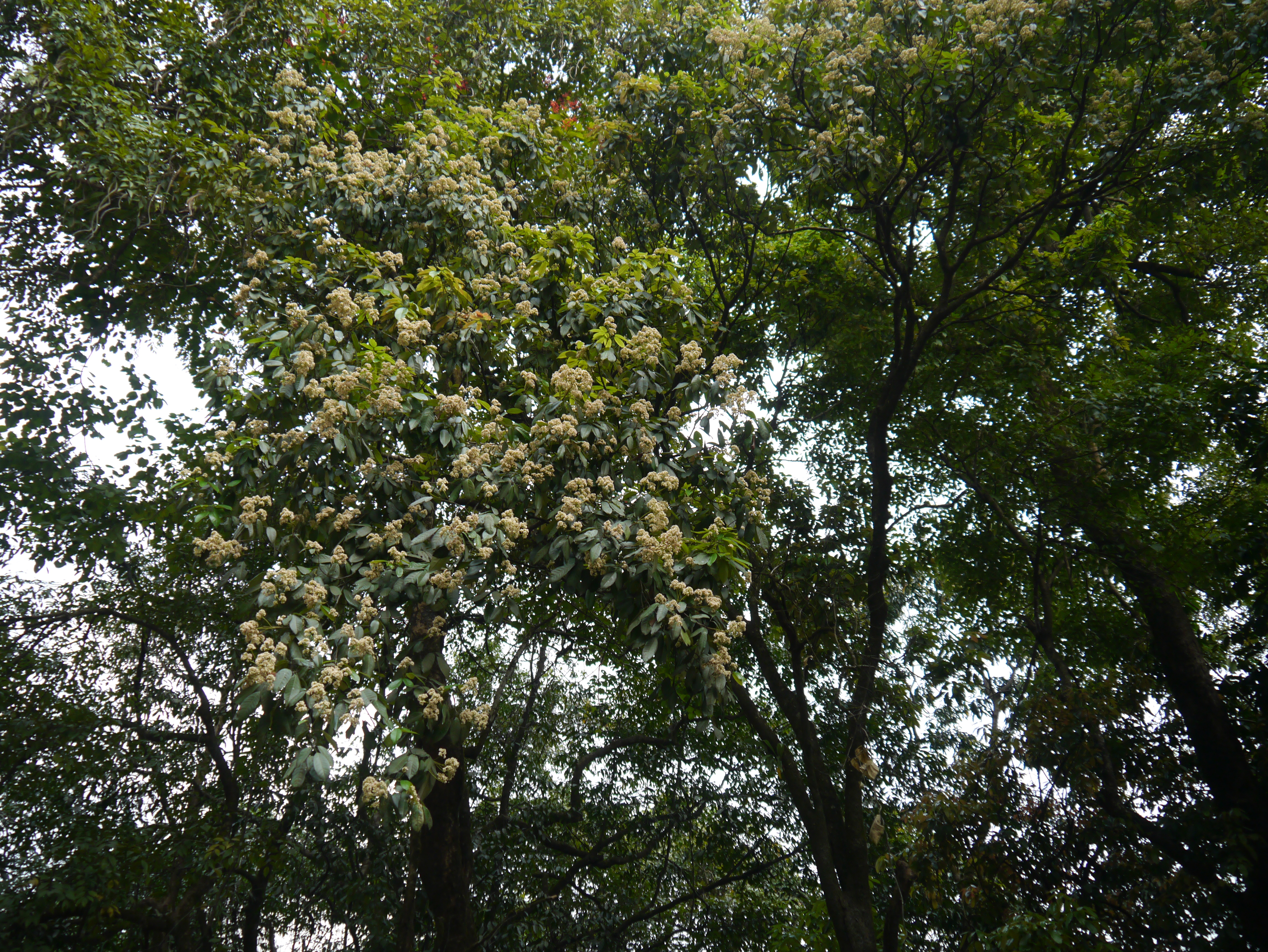
- Walsura trifoliolata

Scientific classification
- Kingdom: Plantae
- Clade: Tracheophytes
- Clade: Angiosperms
- Clade: Eudicots
- Clade: Rosids
- Order: Sapindales
- Family: Meliaceae
- Subfamily: Melioideae
- Genus: Walsura; Roxb.

Synonyms
- Monocyclis Wall. ex Voigt; Napeodendron Ridl.; Surwala M.Roem.

= Walsura =

Genus of flowering plants

Walsura is a genus of plants in the family Meliaceae.

== Species ==
Species accepted by the Plants of the World Online as of February 2023:

- Walsura bonii Pellegr.
- Walsura candollei King
- Walsura decipiens Mabb.
- Walsura dehiscens T.Clark
- Walsura gardneri Thwaites
- Walsura monophylla Elmer ex Merr.
- Walsura oxycarpa Kurz
- Walsura pachycaulon Mabb. ex T.Clark
- Walsura pinnata Hassk.
- Walsura poilanei Pellegr.
- Walsura robusta Roxb.
- Walsura sarawakensis T.Clark
- Walsura trichostemon Miq.
- Walsura trifoliolata (A.Juss.) Harms
- Walsura tubulata Hiern
- Walsura villosa Wall. ex Hiern

== Medicinal uses ==
Some Walsura species may be used for skin troubles and strengthening loose teeth.
