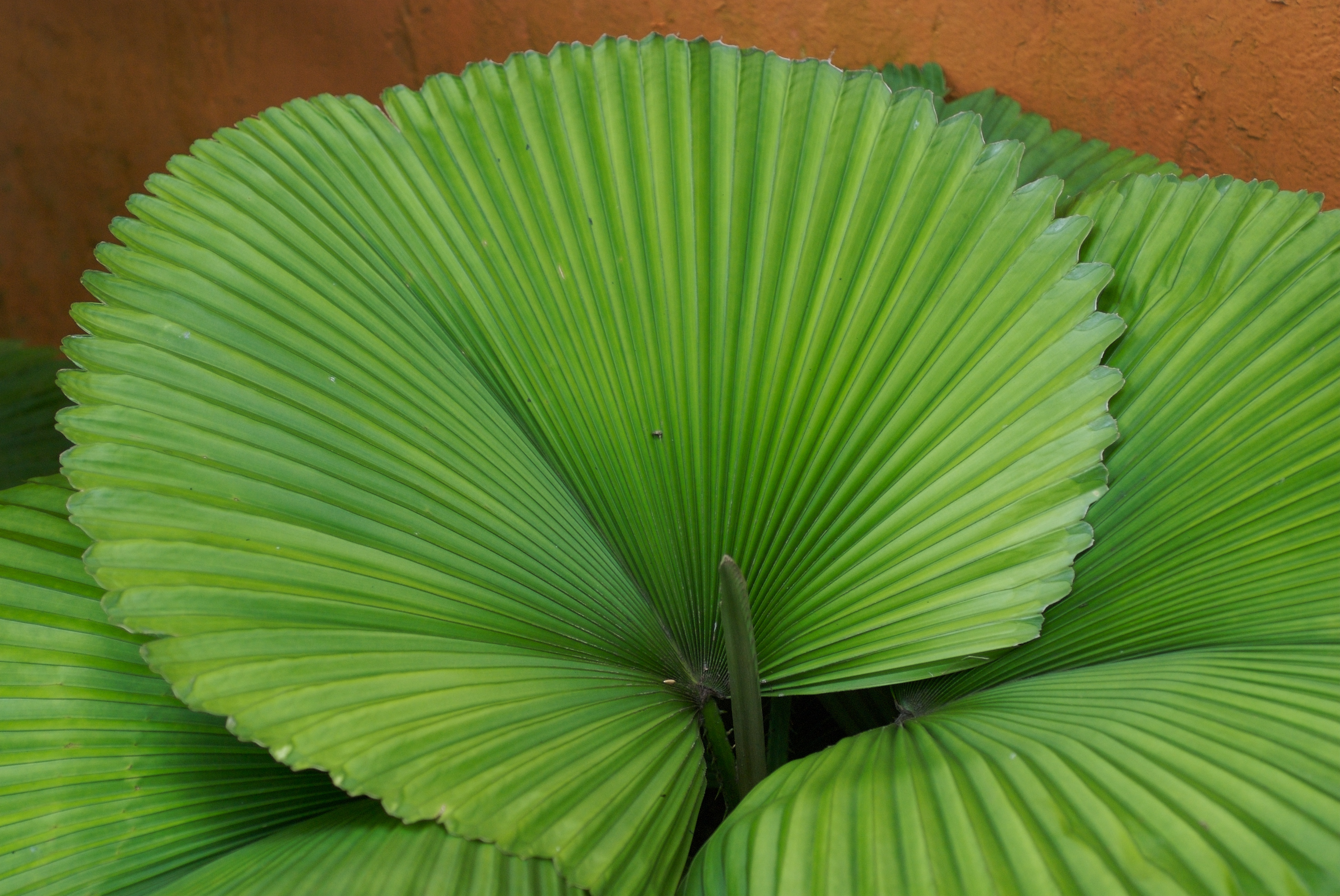

Scientific classification
- Kingdom: Plantae
- Clade: Tracheophytes
- Clade: Angiosperms
- Clade: Monocots
- Clade: Commelinids
- Order: Arecales
- Family: Arecaceae
- Tribe: Trachycarpeae
- Genus: Licuala
- Species: L. orbicularis

Binomial name
- Licuala orbicularis Becc.

Synonyms
- Licuala veitchii W.Watson ex Hook.f.; Pritchardia grandis H.J.Veitch

= Licuala orbicularis =

Species of palm

Licuala orbicularis is a species of palm in the genus Licuala. It is endemic to southwestern Sarawak on the island of Borneo.

It grows as a rainforest understorey plant in mixed dipterocarp forest and kerangas forests, in moist valleys and on hill slopes, from 20 to 550 metres elevation.
