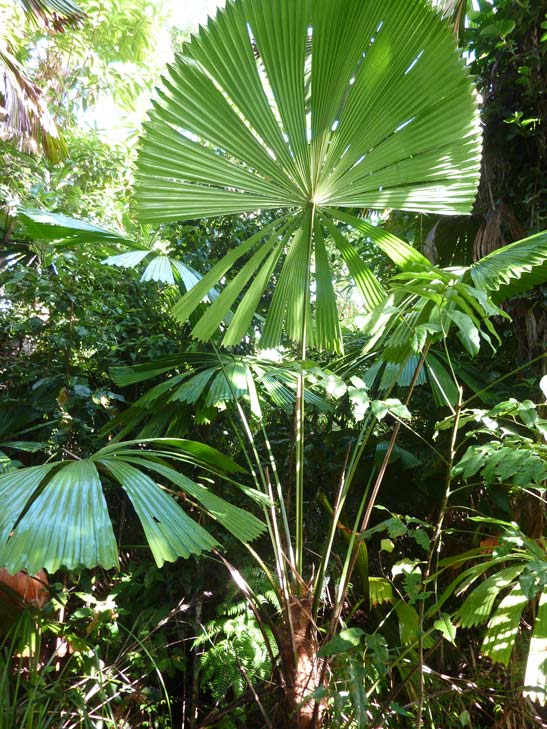
- Licuala ramsayi near Mission Beach, Queensland

Scientific classification
- Kingdom: Plantae
- Clade: Tracheophytes
- Clade: Angiosperms
- Clade: Monocots
- Clade: Commelinids
- Order: Arecales
- Family: Arecaceae
- Tribe: Trachycarpeae
- Genus: Licuala
- Species: L. ramsayi

Binomial name
- Licuala ramsayi F.Muell.

= Licuala ramsayi =

Species of palm endemic to Queensland

Licuala ramsayi, commonly known as the Queensland fan palm or Australian fan palm, is a species of tree in the palm family Arecaceae which is endemic to northeastern Queensland, Australia. Two varieties are recognised: Licuala ramsayi var. ramsayi, and Licuala ramsayi var. tuckeri. It is the only species of the genus Licuala present in Australia.

== Description ==
L. ramsayi is a distinctive palm with a single trunk to 16 m (52 ft) tall and 20 cm (7.9 in) diameter. It has large, pleated, circular leaves up to 2 m (6 ft 7 in) in diameter. Petioles have formidable spines to 5 mm (0.20 in) long. The fruits are a red drupe around 10 mm (0.39 in) diameter containing a single seed.

== Distribution and habitat ==
The species grows in swamps, along riverbanks, and in rainforests in Australia. In favourable conditions it may dominate small areas, forming a "fan palm forest". L. ramsayi var. tuckeri is found in Cape York Peninsula southwards to about Cooktown, while L. ramsayi var. ramsayi occurs from Cooktown to the Paluma Range north of Townsville.

== Ecology ==
Trees provided an edible cabbage to Aboriginals, as well as thatch, food wrapping, and cigarette papers (from young leaves) Fruits are eaten by cassowaries.

== Gallery ==
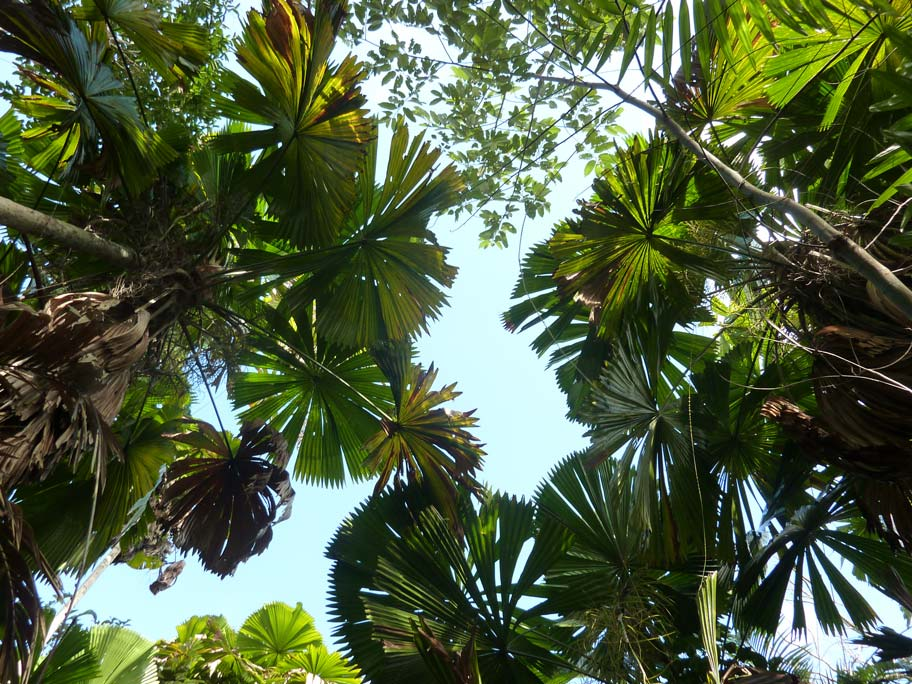
Licuala Walking Track near Wongaling Beach, Queensland

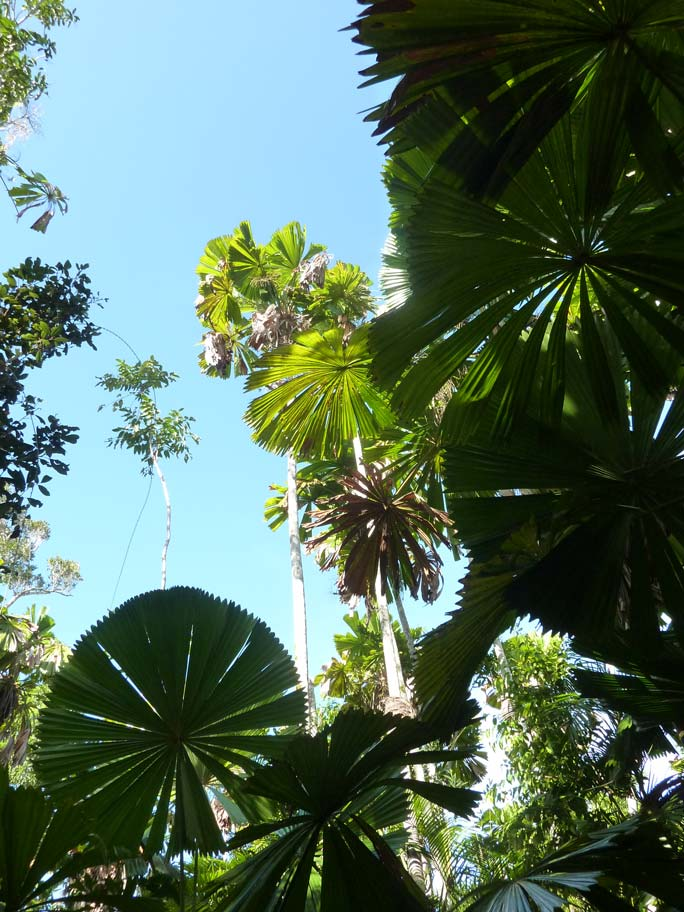

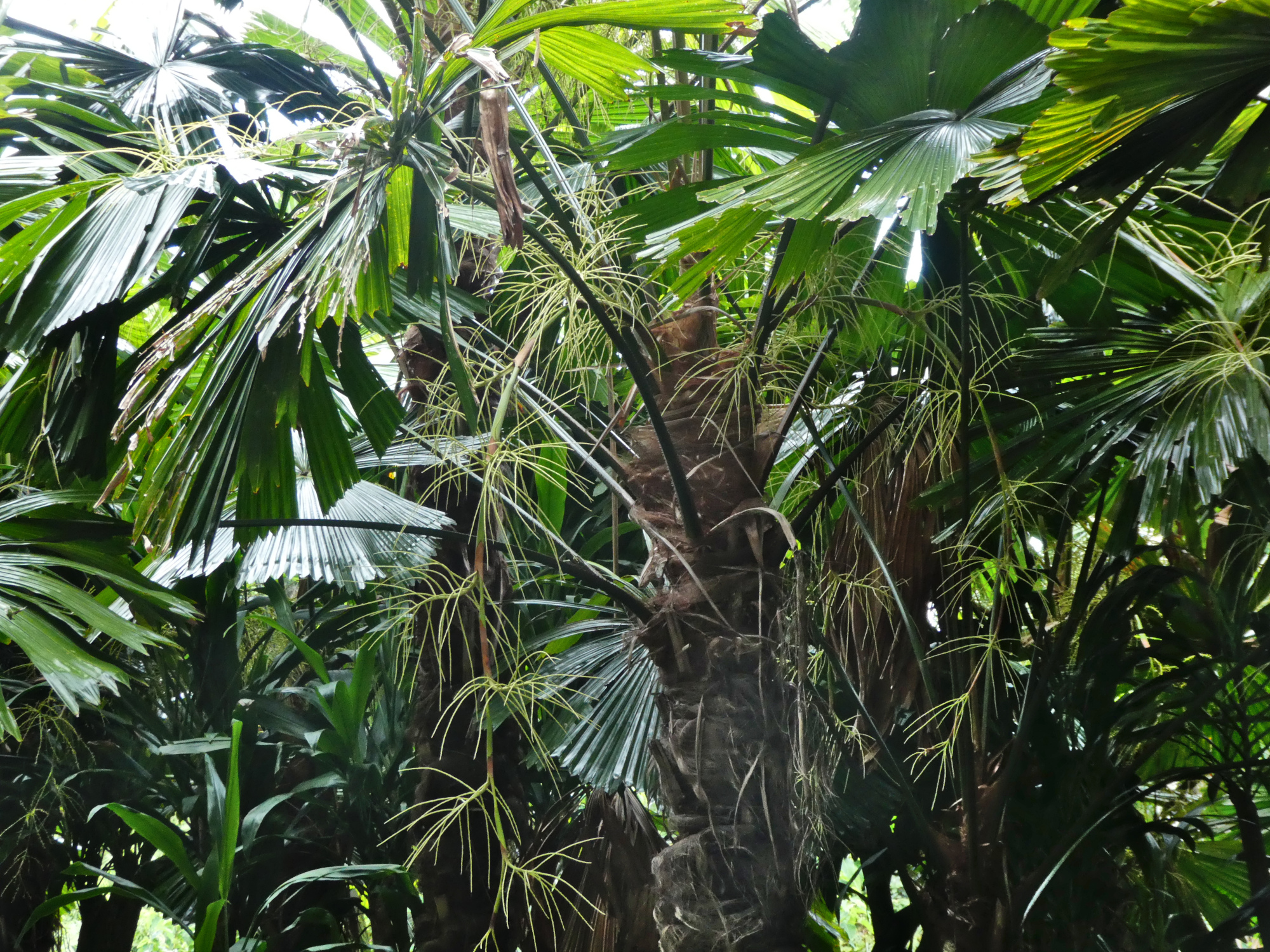
The spidery inflorescence

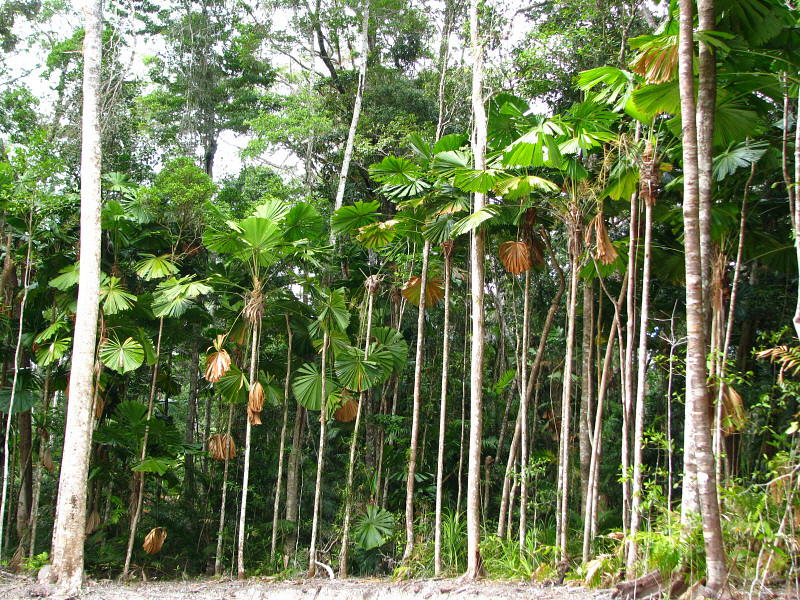
Dominating a section of rainforest
