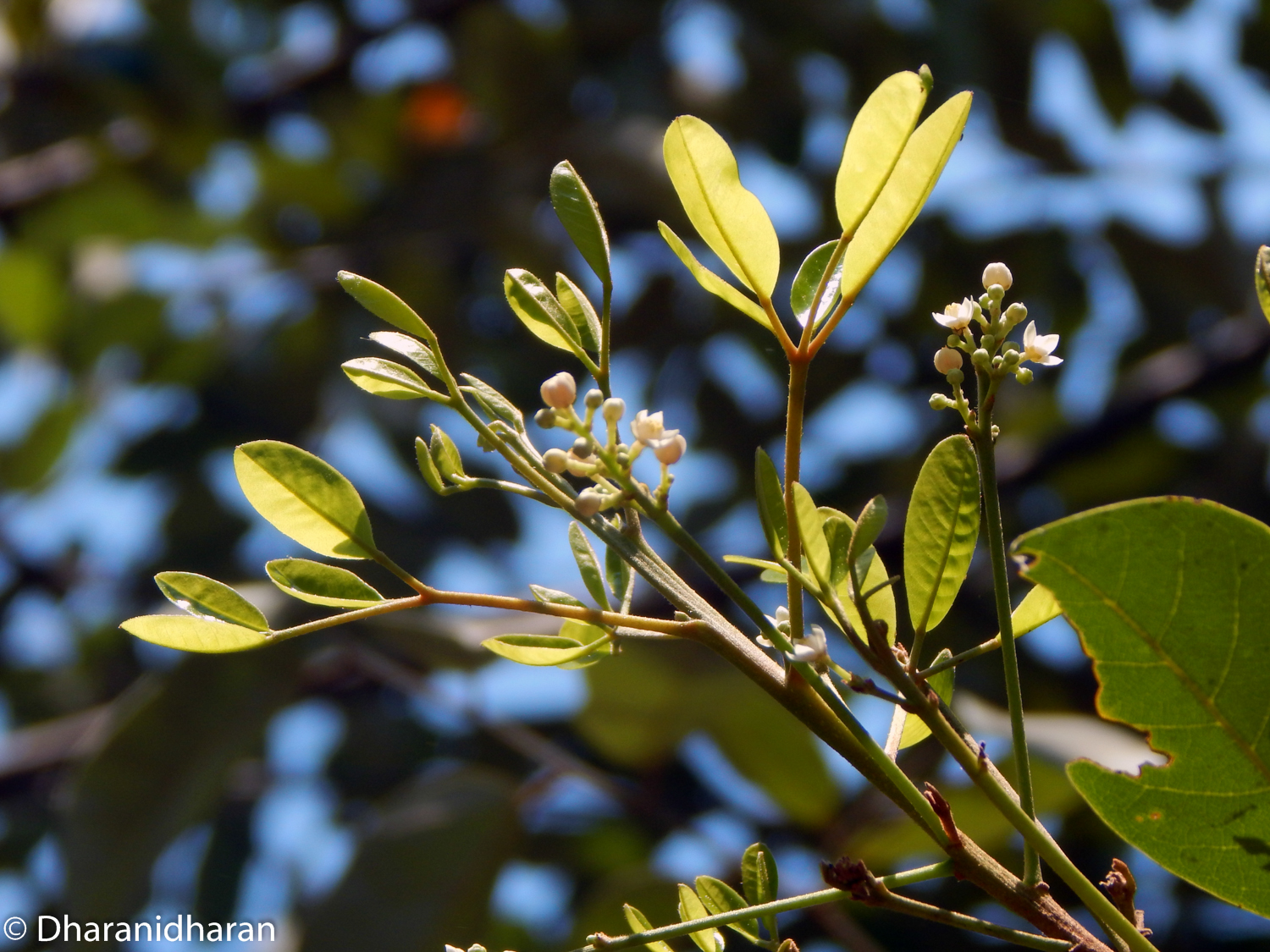

Scientific classification
- Kingdom: Plantae
- Clade: Tracheophytes
- Clade: Angiosperms
- Clade: Eudicots
- Clade: Rosids
- Order: Sapindales
- Family: Meliaceae
- Genus: Walsura
- Species: W. trifoliolata

Binomial name
- Walsura trifoliolata (A.Juss.) Harms

Synonyms
- Heynea trifolia A.Juss.

= Walsura trifoliolata =

Species of tree

Walsura trifoliolata is a tree in the family Meliaceae. The correct scientific name is unresolved up to date, where some name the plant as Heynea trifolia and some others as Walsura trifoliolata. The specific epithet trifoliolata is due to its trifoliate leaves. The plant is native to India and Sri Lanka.

== Description ==
Walsura trifoliolata grows up to 15 metres (50 ft) tall with a trunk with pale brown bark. Leaves are compound, trifoliate, alternate; lamina narrow oblong to elliptic or narrow obovate; apex acuminate or rounded with retuse tip; base acute to cuneate and margin entire. Flowers are greenish yellow and show terminal or axillary panicles inflorescence. Fruit is pale brown 1 or 2 seeded ovoid berry. Flowering and fruiting may occur during November–June.
