= Walsura pachycaulon =

Scientific classification
- Kingdom: Plantae
- Clade: Tracheophytes
- Clade: Angiosperms
- Clade: Eudicots
- Clade: Rosids
- Order: Sapindales
- Family: Meliaceae
- Genus: Walsura
- Species: W. pachycaulon

Binomial name
- Walsura pachycaulon Mabb. ex T.Clark

Species of tree

Walsura pachycaulon is a tree in the family Meliaceae. The specific epithet pachycaulon means 'thick stems', referring to the leaf stems.

== Description ==
Walsura pachycaulon grows up to 29 metres (100 ft) tall, with a bole diameter of up to 25 cm (10 in). The bark is black to brown. The leaves are oblong to elliptic to oblanceolate and measure up to 19.5 cm (8 in) long. The round fruits are brown.

== Distribution and habitat ==
Walsura pachycaulon is endemic to Borneo. Its habitat is hill and lowland forests to elevations of about 1,000 m (3,300 ft).
