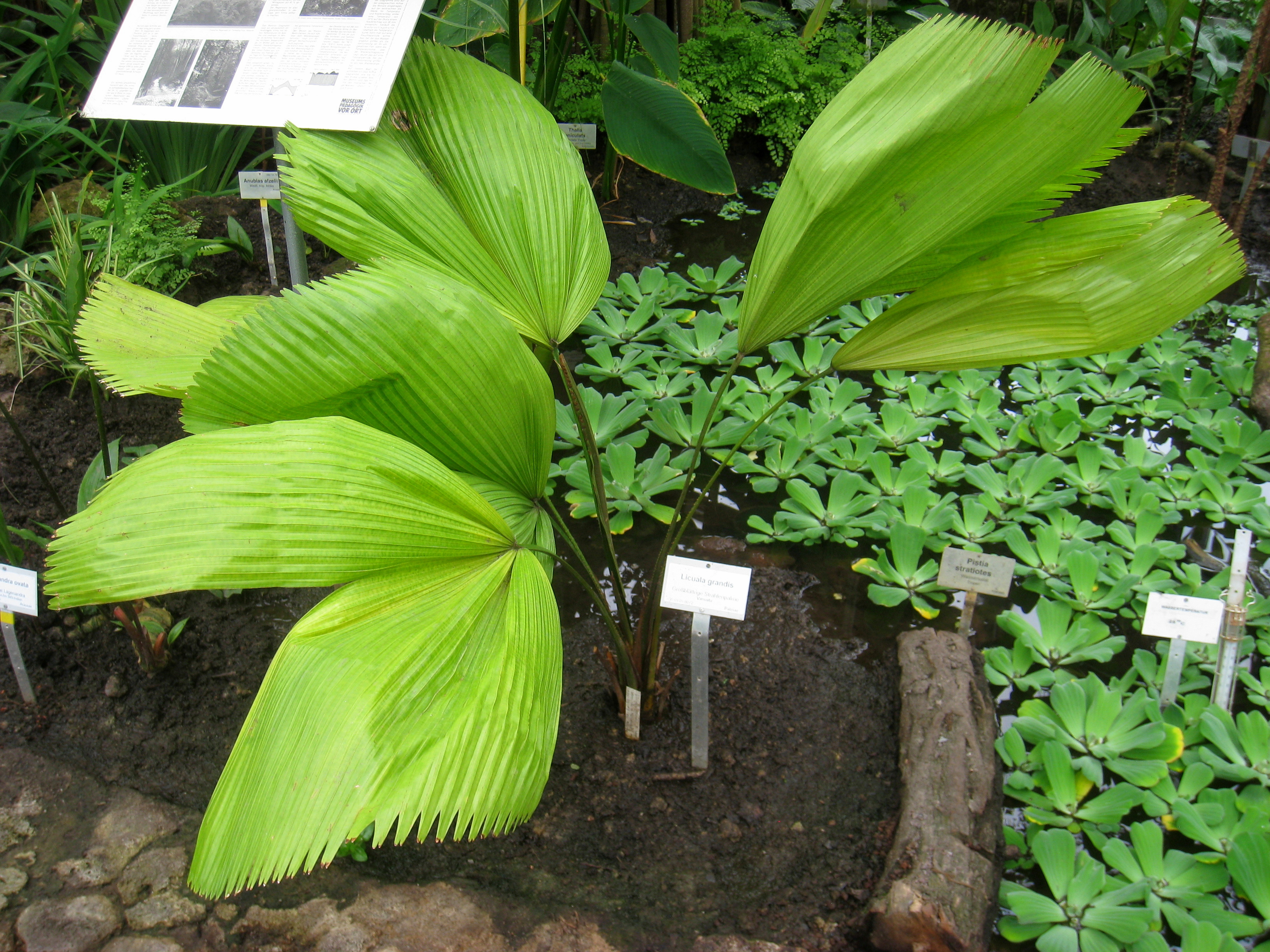
- Licuala grandis with Water lettuce, Anubias, Alligator flag, and Lagenandra ovata

Scientific classification
- Kingdom: Plantae
- Clade: Tracheophytes
- Clade: Angiosperms
- Clade: Monocots
- Clade: Commelinids
- Order: Arecales
- Family: Arecaceae
- Genus: Licuala
- Species: L. grandis

Binomial name
- Licuala grandis (T.Moore) H.Wendl.

Synonyms
- Homotypic Synonyms: Pritchardia grandis T.Moore

= Licuala grandis =

Species of palm

Licuala grandis is a species of flowering plant in the palm family, Arecaceae. It is sometimes referred to by the common names Licuala palm, Palas palm, Ruffled Fan Palm, and Vanuatu fan palm.

It is native to the Santa Cruz Islands, and Vanuatu. It grows in the understory of primary and secondary tropical rain forests. It produces hermaphroditic inflorescences. It bears round green fruit that redden as they ripen, each containing a single seed.

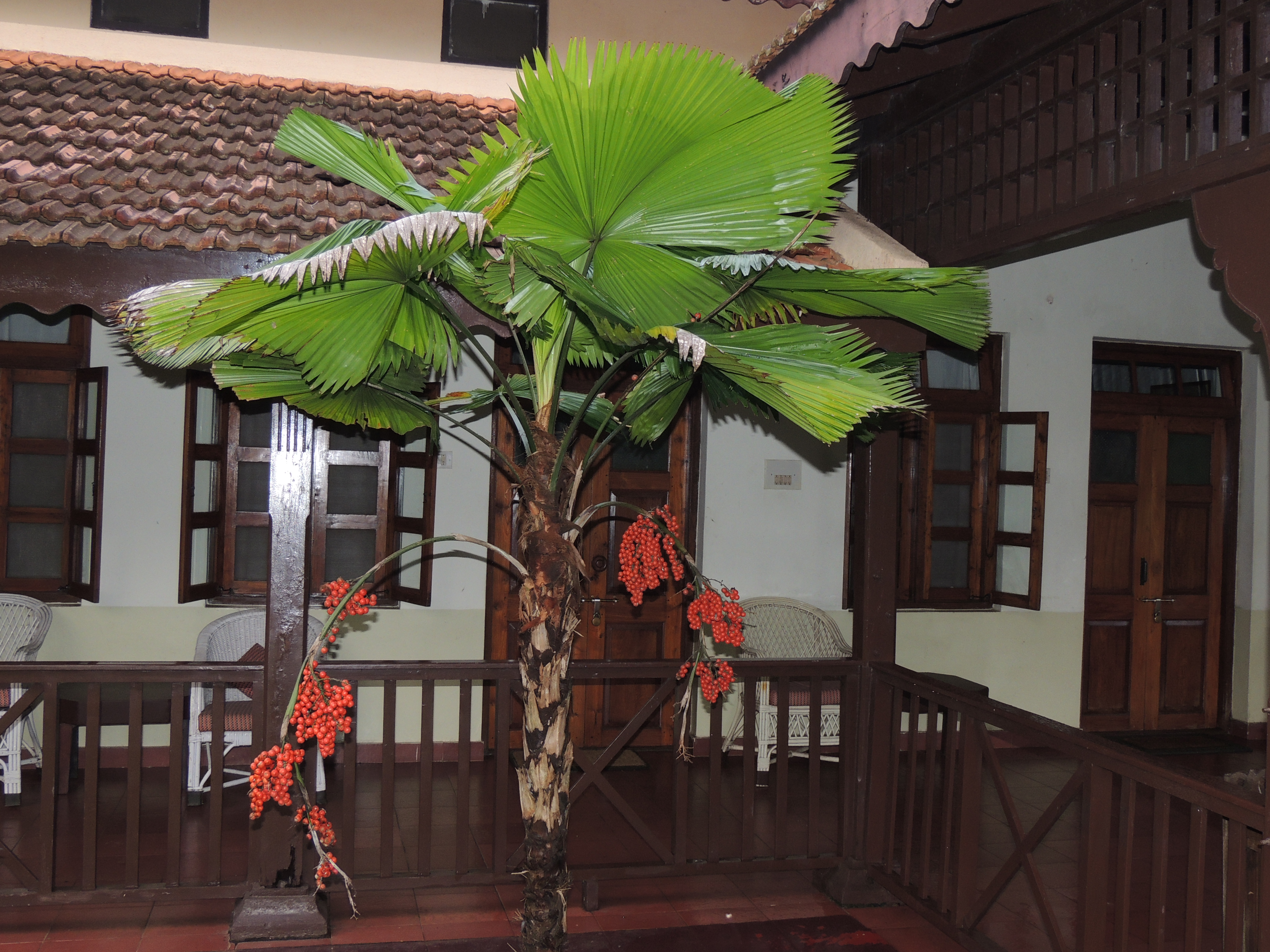
Licuala grandis in 2013

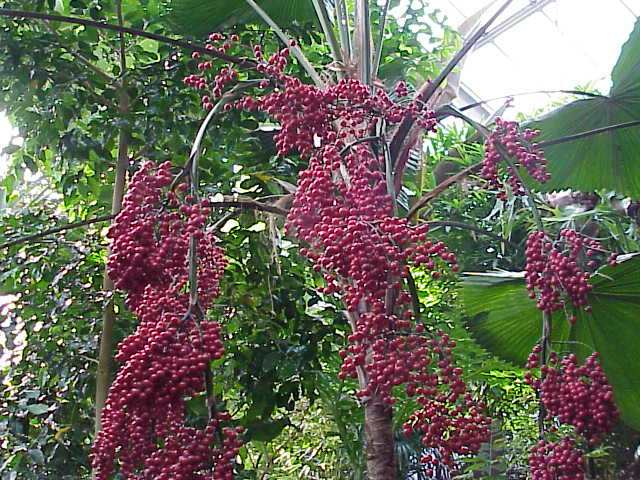
Licuala grandis in 2004
