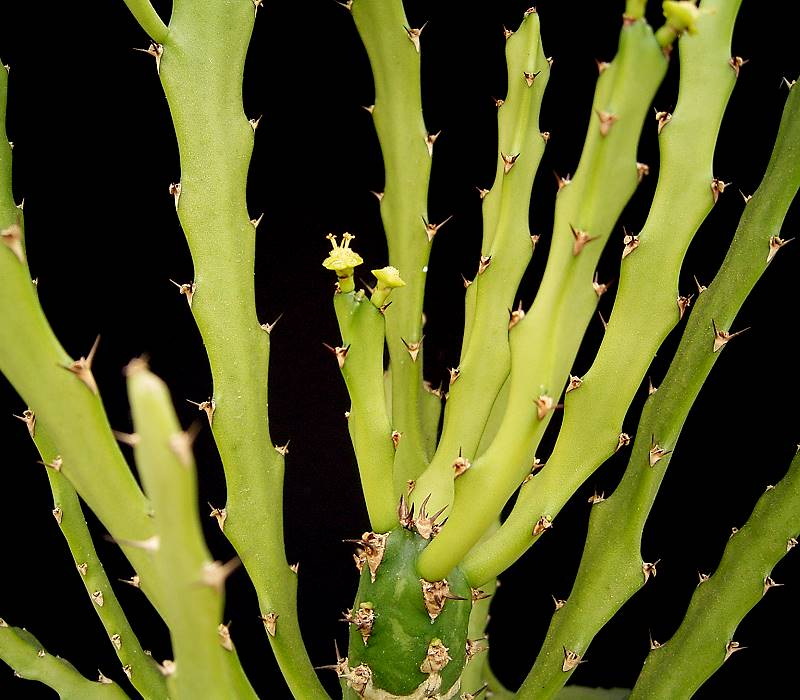

Conservation status
- Endangered (IUCN 2.3)

Scientific classification
- Kingdom: Plantae
- Clade: Tracheophytes
- Clade: Angiosperms
- Clade: Eudicots
- Clade: Rosids
- Order: Malpighiales
- Family: Euphorbiaceae
- Genus: Euphorbia
- Species: E. epiphylloides

Binomial name
- Euphorbia epiphylloides Kurz

= Euphorbia epiphylloides =

Species of flowering plant

Euphorbia epiphylloides is a species of flowering plant in the family Euphorbiaceae. It is endemic to the Andaman Islands.
