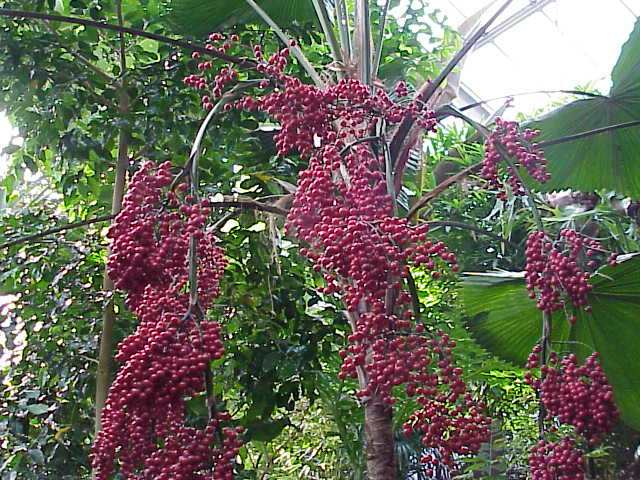
- Licuala grandis

Scientific classification
- Kingdom: Plantae
- Clade: Tracheophytes
- Clade: Angiosperms
- Clade: Monocots
- Clade: Commelinids
- Order: Arecales
- Family: Arecaceae
- Subfamily: Coryphoideae
- Tribe: Trachycarpeae
- Genus: Licuala; Wurmb

Synonyms
- Pericycla Blume; Dammera K.Schum. & Lauterb.

= Licuala =

Genus of palms

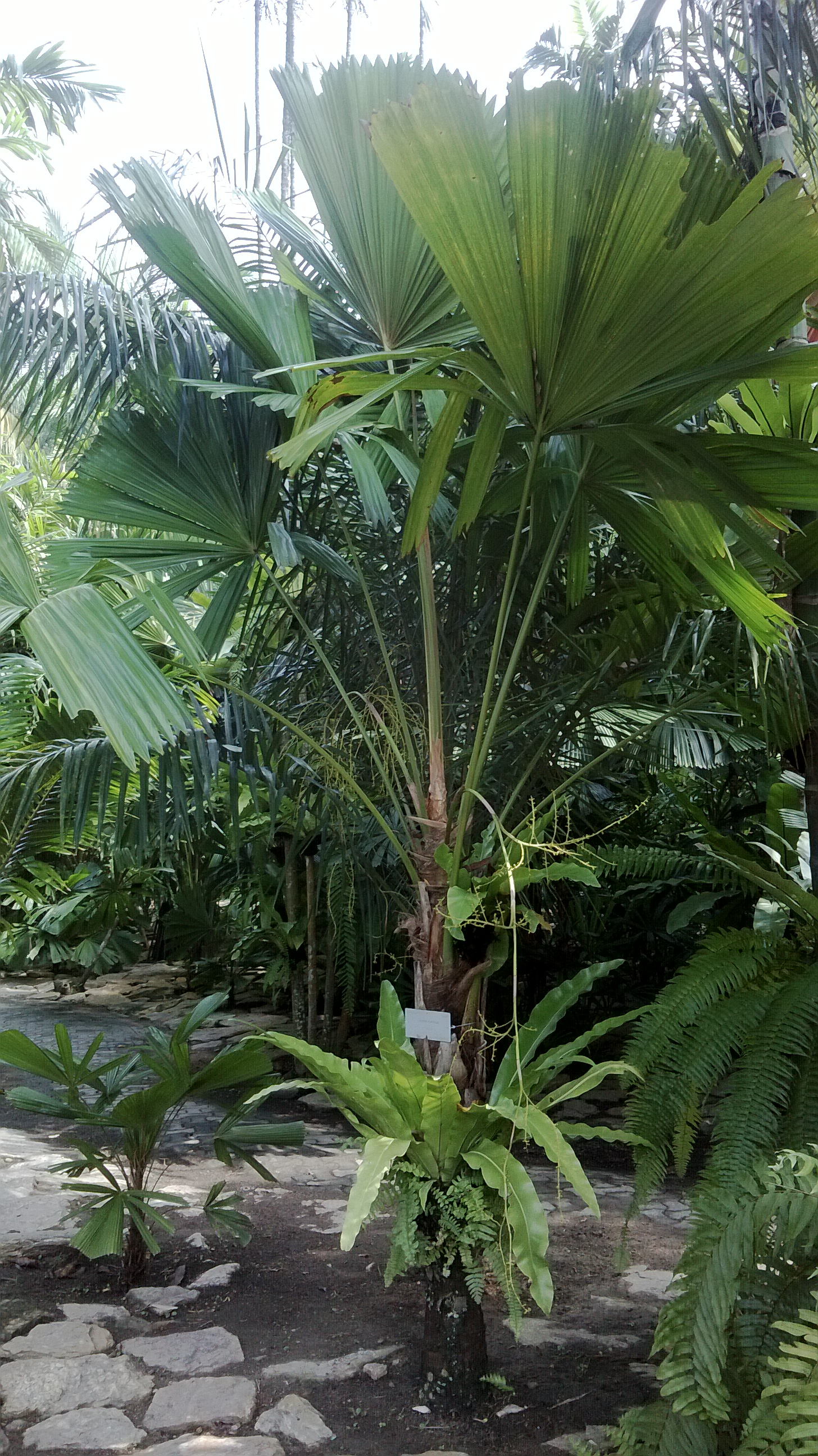
Licuala ramsayi

Licuala is a genus of palms, in the tribe Trachycarpeae, commonly found in tropical forests of southern China, Southeast Asia, the Himalayas, New Guinea and the western Pacific Ocean islands.

== Description and uses ==
Licuala spp. are fan palms, with the leaves mostly circular in outline, sometimes undivided but more usually divided into wedge-shaped segments. Licuala acutifida is the source of cane for the walking stick nicknamed the Penang-lawyer by colonials, probably from the Malay phrase pinang liyar for a wild areca, although the term may also refer to the use of these canes as deadly knobkerries to assassinate litigious enemies. Several species of Licuala have been transferred into a new genus Lanonia.

== Species ==
As of March 2026, Plants of the World Online accepts the following 149 species:

- Licuala acuminata Burret
- Licuala acutifida Mart.
- Licuala adscendens Barfod & Heatubun
- Licuala ahlidurii Saw
- Licuala anomala Becc.
- Licuala atrovirens Saw
- Licuala atroviridis A.J.Hend., N.K.Ban & N.Q.Dung
- Licuala averyanovii A.J.Hend., N.K.Ban & N.Q.Dung
- Licuala bachmaensis A.J.Hend., N.K.Ban & N.Q.Dung
- Licuala bacularia Becc.
- Licuala bakeri Barfod & Heatubun
- Licuala bankae Barfod & Heatubun
- Licuala bayana Saw
- Licuala bellatula Becc.
- Licuala bidentata Becc.
- Licuala bidoupensis A.J.Hend., N.K.Ban & N.Q.Dung
- Licuala bifida Heatubun & Barfod
- Licuala bintulensis Becc.
- Licuala bissula Miq.
- Licuala borneensis Becc.
- Licuala bracteata Gagnep.
- Licuala brevicalyx Becc.
- Licuala bruneiana Saw
- Licuala burretii Saw
- Licuala cabalionii Dowe
- Licuala caespitosa A.J.Hend. & N.Q.Dung
- Licuala cameronensis Saw
- Licuala campestris Saw
- Licuala cattienensis A.J.Hend., N.K.Ban & N.Q.Dung
- Licuala celebica Miq.
- Licuala chaiana Saw
- Licuala coccinisedes Barfod & Heatubun
- Licuala collina Saw
- Licuala cordata Becc.
- Licuala corneri Furtado
- Licuala dakrongensis A.J.Hend., N.K.Ban & B.V.Thanh
- Licuala densiflora Becc.
- Licuala distans Ridl.
- Licuala egregia Saw
- Licuala elegans Blume
- Licuala ellipsoidalis A.J.Hend., N.K.Ban & N.Q.Dung
- Licuala elliptica Saw
- Licuala essigii Barfod & Heatubun
- Licuala exigua Saw
- Licuala ferruginea Becc.
- Licuala ferruginoides Becc.
- Licuala flammula Saw
- Licuala flexuosa Burret
- Licuala fordiana Becc.
- Licuala fractiflexa Saw
- Licuala glaberrima Gagnep.
- Licuala glabra Griff.
- Licuala graminifolia Heatubun & Barfod
- Licuala grandiflora Ridl.
- Licuala grandis (T.Moore) H.Wendl.
- Licuala hairulii Saw
- Licuala hallieriana Becc.
- Licuala heatubunii Barfod & W.J.Baker
- Licuala honbaensis A.J.Hend. & N.Q.Dung
- Licuala honheoensis A.J.Hend. & N.Q.Dung
- Licuala insignis Becc.
- Licuala intermedia Saw
- Licuala kamarudinii Saw
- Licuala kemamanensis Furtado
- Licuala khoonmengii Saw
- Licuala kiahii Furtado
- Licuala kingiana Becc.
- Licuala kuchingensis Saw
- Licuala kunstleri Becc.
- Licuala lambii Saw
- Licuala lamdongensis A.J.Hend. & N.Q.Dung
- Licuala lanata J.Dransf.
- Licuala lanuginosa Ridl.
- Licuala lauterbachii Dammer & K.Schum.
- Licuala leopoldii Saw
- Licuala leucocarpa Saw
- Licuala longicalycata Furtado
- Licuala longiflora A.J.Hend., N.K.Ban & N.Q.Dung
- Licuala longipes Griff.
- Licuala longispadix Banka & Barfod
- Licuala maculata Saw
- Licuala malajana Becc.
- Licuala mattanensis Becc.
- Licuala meijeri Saw
- Licuala merguensis Becc.
- Licuala micholitzii Ridl.
- Licuala mirabilis Furtado
- Licuala miriensis Saw
- Licuala modesta Becc.
- Licuala montana Dammer & K.Schum.
- Licuala moyseyi Furtado
- Licuala mukahensis Saw
- Licuala multibracteata Barfod & Heatubun
- Licuala mustapana Saw
- Licuala nana Blume
- Licuala nuichuaensis A.J.Hend. & N.Q.Dung
- Licuala olivifera Becc.
- Licuala oliviformis Becc.
- Licuala orbicularis Becc.
- Licuala oryzoides Saw
- Licuala pahangensis Furtado
- Licuala palas Saw
- Licuala paludosa Griff.
- Licuala parviflora Dammer ex Becc.
- Licuala parvula A.J.Hend. & N.Q.Dung
- Licuala patens Ridl.
- Licuala peekelii Lauterb.
- Licuala peltata Roxb. ex Buch.-Ham.
- Licuala penduliflora (Blume) Zipp. ex Blume
- Licuala petiolulata Becc.
- Licuala pilosa Saw
- Licuala pitta Vatch. ex Barfod & Pongsatt.
- Licuala poonsakii Hodel
- Licuala pseudovalida Saw
- Licuala pumila Blume
- Licuala punctulata Burret
- Licuala pusilla Becc.
- Licuala radula Gagnep.
- Licuala ramsayi (F.Muell.) Domin
- Licuala reptans Becc.
- Licuala rheophytica Saw
- Licuala ridleyana Becc.
- Licuala robinsoniana Becc.
- Licuala rubiginosa Saw
- Licuala rumphii Blume
- Licuala ruthiae Saw
- Licuala sabahana Saw
- Licuala sallehana Saw
- Licuala sandsiana Barfod & Heatubun
- Licuala sarawakensis Becc.
- Licuala scortechinii Becc.
- Licuala simplex (K.Schum. & Lauterb.) Becc.
- Licuala spathellifera Becc.
- Licuala spectabilis Miq.
- Licuala spicata Becc.
- Licuala spinosa Wurmb
- Licuala stipitata Burret
- Licuala stongensis Saw
- Licuala suprafolia Barfod & Heatubun
- Licuala taynguyensis Barfod & Borchs.
- Licuala telifera Becc.
- Licuala tenuissima Saw
- Licuala terengganuensis Saw
- Licuala thoana Saw & J.Dransf.
- Licuala tiomanensis Furtado
- Licuala triphylla Griff.
- Licuala urciflora Barfod & Heatubun
- Licuala whitmorei Saw
- Licuala yiiana Saw
