= Walsura robusta =

Scientific classification
- Kingdom: Plantae
- Clade: Tracheophytes
- Clade: Angiosperms
- Clade: Eudicots
- Clade: Rosids
- Order: Sapindales
- Family: Meliaceae
- Genus: Walsura
- Species: W. robusta

Binomial name
- Walsura robusta Roxb.

Synonyms
- Surwala robusta M. Roem. Scytalia glabra Buch.-Ham. ex Wall. Scutinanthe boerlagii Hochr. Monocyclis obusta Wall. ex Voigt

Species of tree

Walsura robusta is a tree species described by William Roxburgh; it is included in the family Meliaceae. No subspecies are listed in the Catalogue of Life. In Vietnamese its name is lòng tong.
