= Kwangtung Island Wildlife Sanctuary =

Protected area on North Andaman Island

Kwangtang Island Wildlife Sanctuary
- Kwangtung Island Wildlife Sanctuary
- IUCN category IV (habitat/species management area)
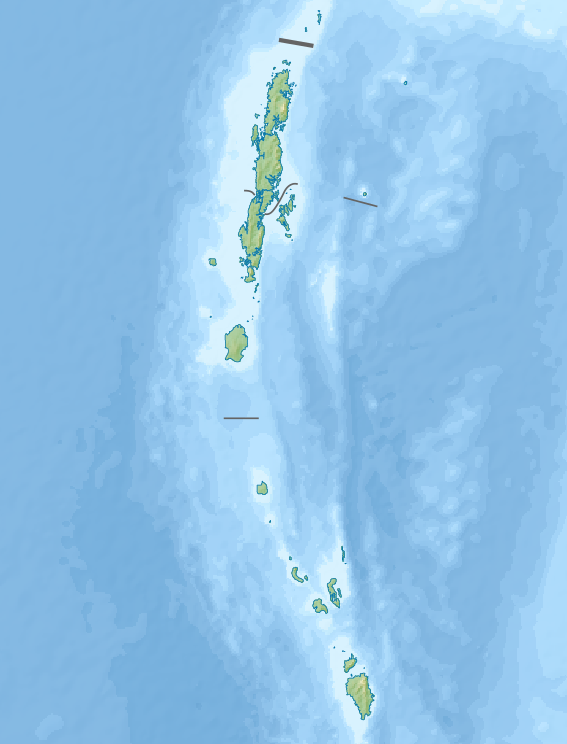
- Location within Andaman and Nicobar Islands Location within India
- Interactive map of Kwangtang Island Wildlife Sanctuary
- Location: North Andaman Island, Andaman and Nicobar Islands, India
- Coordinates: 13.4100°N 93.0300°E
- Area: 0.57 km^{2} (0.22 sq mi)
- Established: 1987
- Governing body: Forest Department, Andaman & Nicobar Islands

Kwangtang Island Wildlife Sanctuary (also spelled Kwangtung Island Wildlife Sanctuary) is a protected area located on North Andaman Island in the Andaman and Nicobar Islands, India. It spans approximately 0.57 km² and was officially notified in 1987 as part of the Union Territory’s network of wildlife sanctuaries under IUCN Category IV. It lies southeast of the McPherson Bay.

== History ==
The sanctuary was established in 1987 through a notification by the Government of India under the Wildlife Protection Act, 1972, as one of the 96 designated wildlife sanctuaries in the Andaman and Nicobar Islands.

== Biodiversity ==
The animals found here are: Nicobar Pigeon, Andaman Teal, Andaman Water Monitor Lizard, Wild Boar, Green Sea Turtle, Saltwater Crocodile and Marine Turtles.

The flora includes: Dipterocarpus, Ficus retusa, Manilkara littoralis, Pongamia pinnata, and Terminalia bialata.

== Management ==
Kwangtang Island Wildlife Sanctuary is administered by the Department of Environment and Forests of the Andaman & Nicobar Administration. Public access is restricted, and prior permission is required for tourism, photography, or scientific research under the Wildlife Protection Act.

== See also ==
- List of wildlife sanctuaries in India
