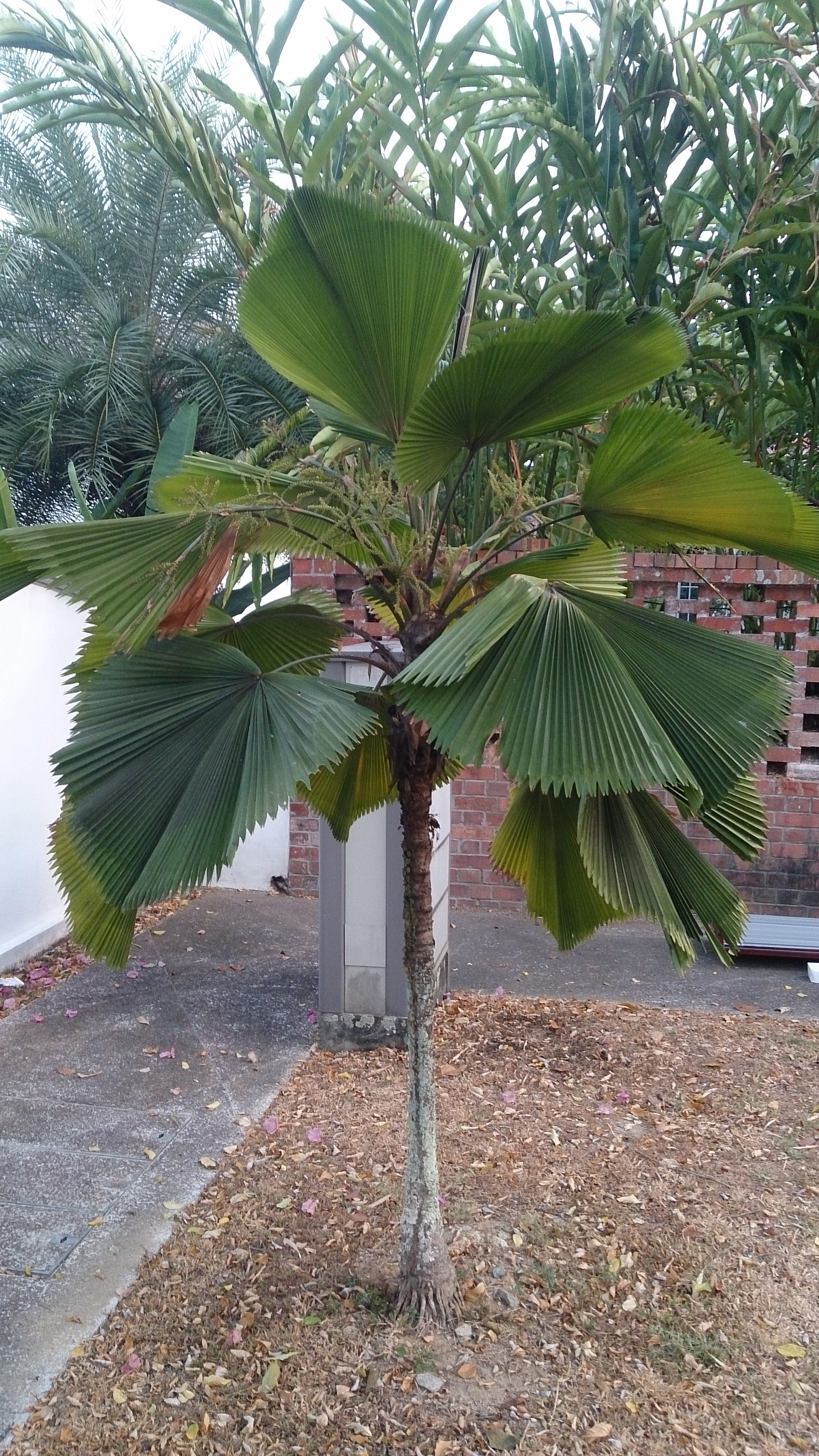

Scientific classification
- Kingdom: Plantae
- Clade: Tracheophytes
- Clade: Angiosperms
- Clade: Monocots
- Clade: Commelinids
- Order: Arecales
- Family: Arecaceae
- Tribe: Trachycarpeae
- Genus: Licuala
- Species: L. peltata

Binomial name
- Licuala peltata Roxb. ex Buch.-Ham.

= Licuala peltata =

Species of palm

Licuala peltata is a species of palm tree in the family Arecaceae. It is found in South Asia and Southeast Asia. The triangular leaves are not truly peltate, or if so only marginally so.

== Varieties ==
- Licuala peltata var. sumawongii, found in Malaysia and southern Thailand
- Licuala peltata var. peltata, found in South and Southeast Asia

== Gallery ==
Licuala peltata var. sumawongii

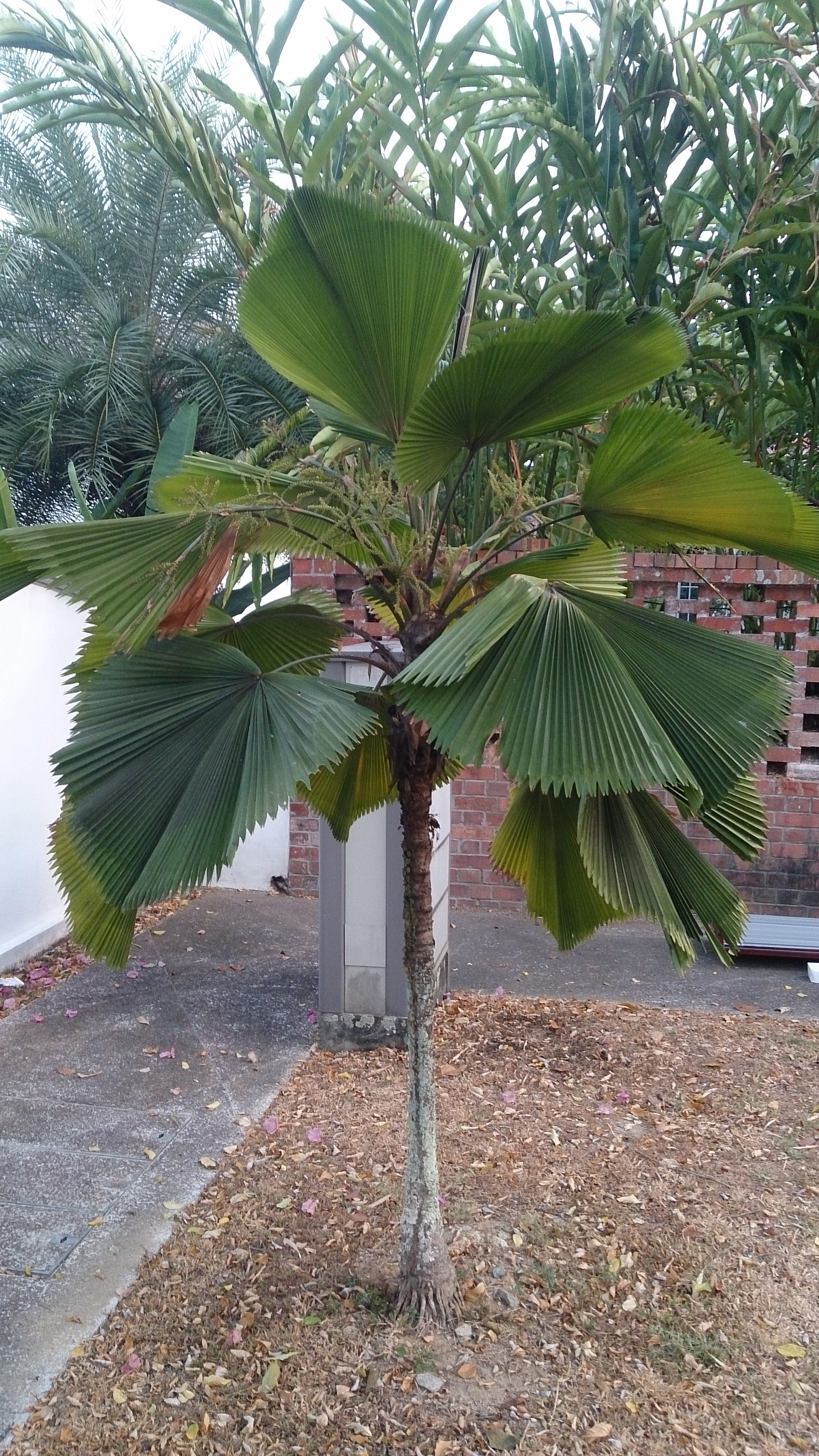

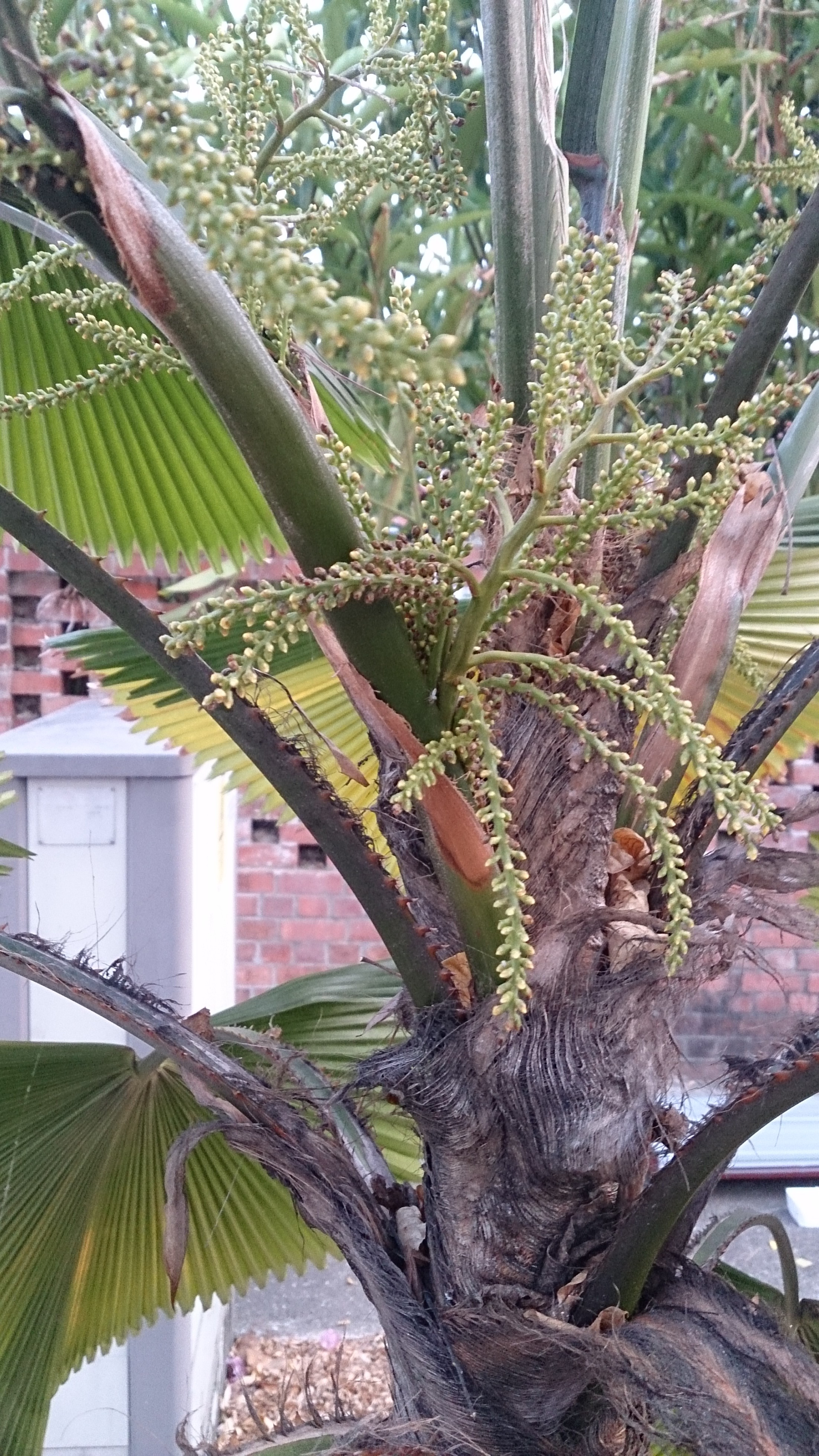

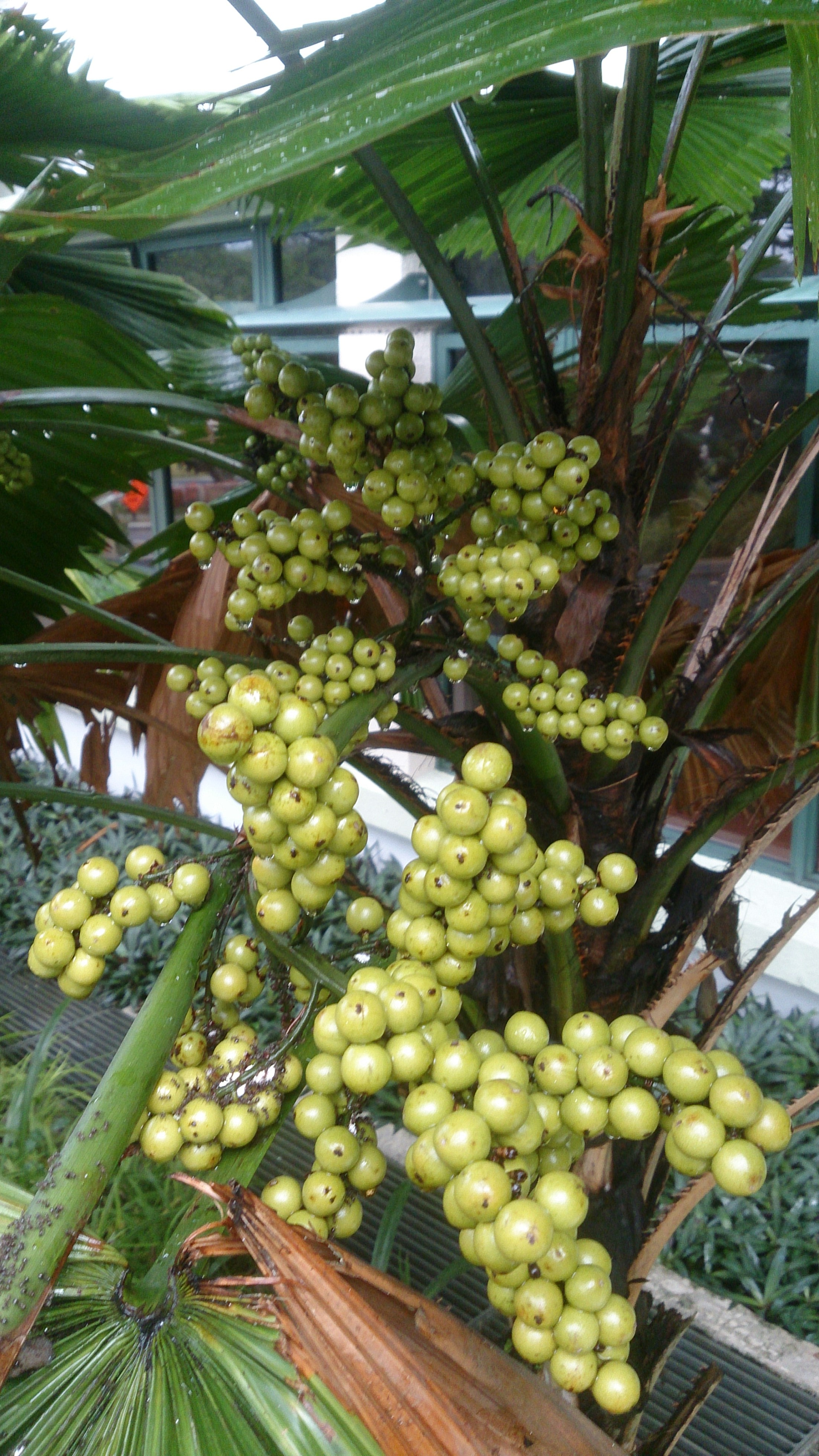

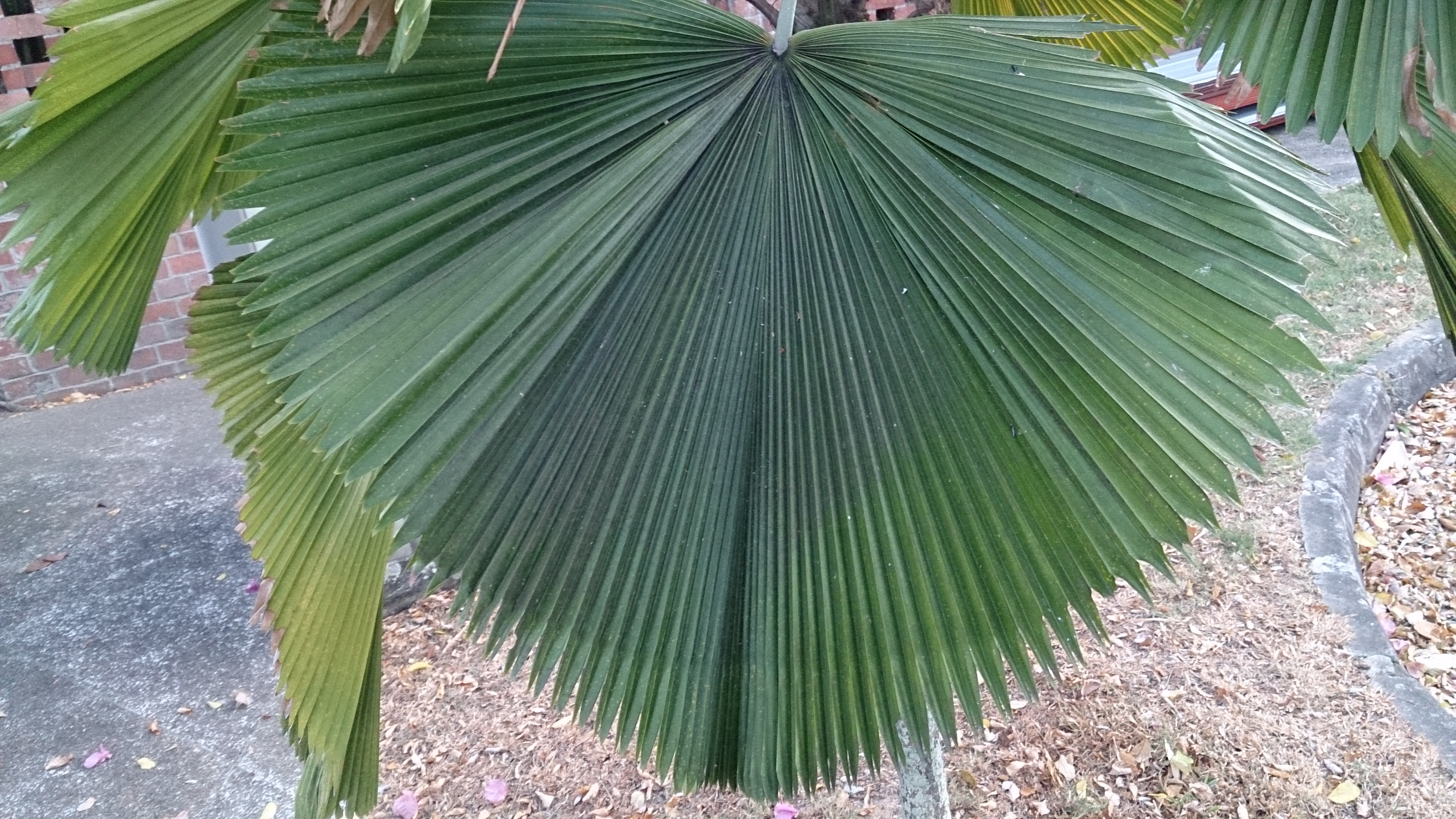
