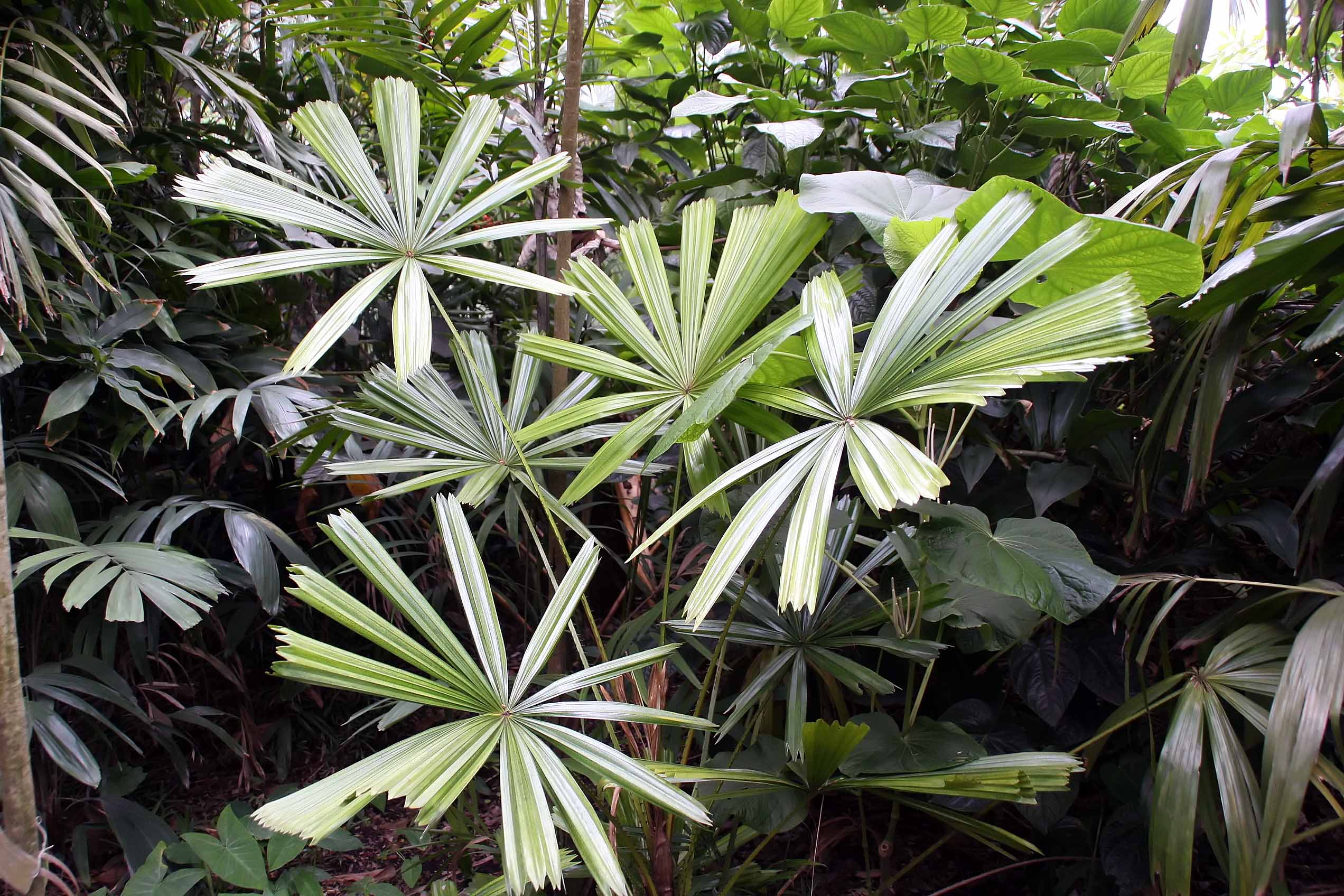

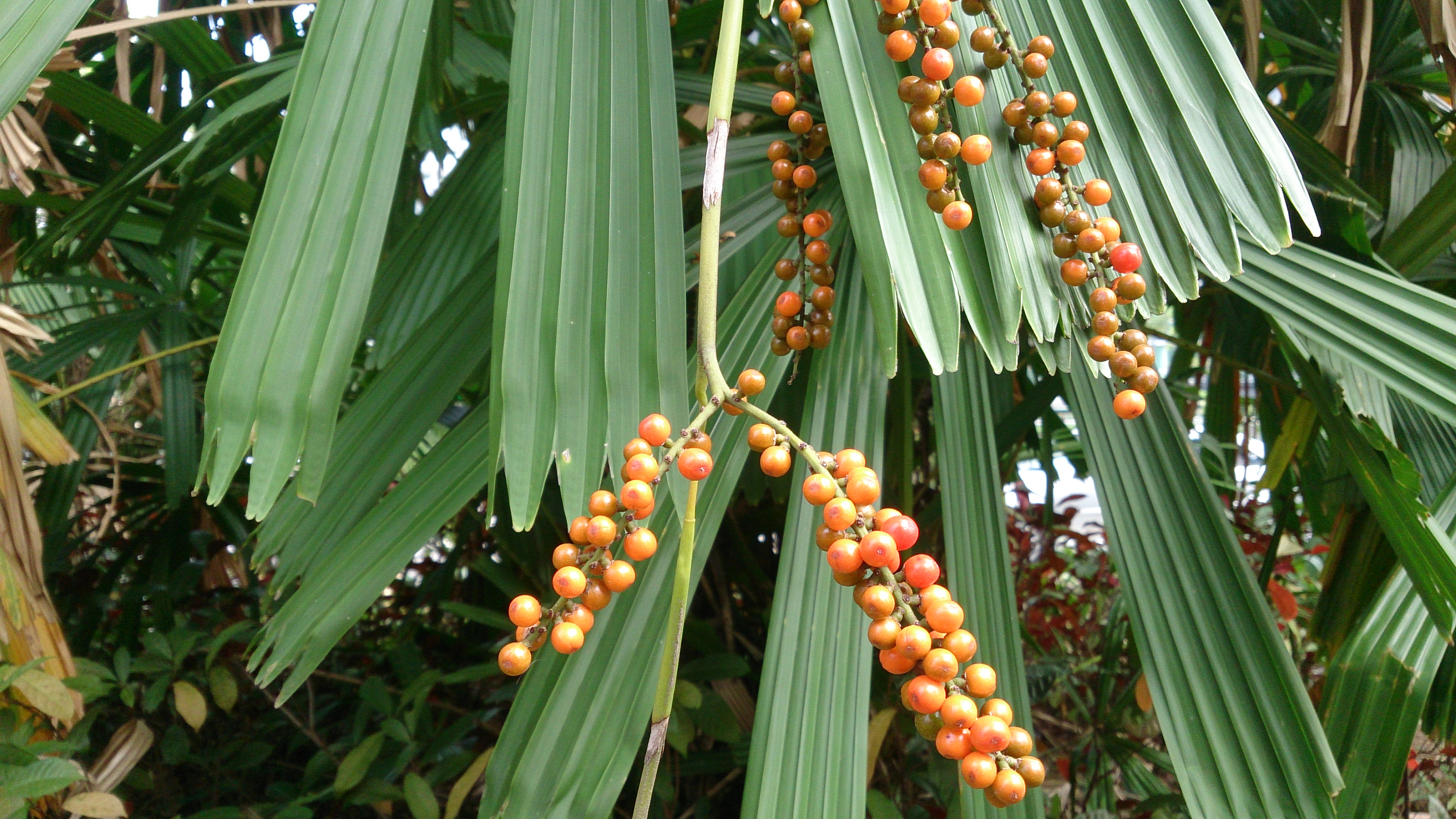

Scientific classification
- Kingdom: Plantae
- Clade: Tracheophytes
- Clade: Angiosperms
- Clade: Monocots
- Clade: Commelinids
- Order: Arecales
- Family: Arecaceae
- Tribe: Trachycarpeae
- Genus: Licuala
- Species: L. spinosa

Binomial name
- Licuala spinosa Roxb.

Synonyms
- Corypha pilearia Lour.; Licuala acutifida var. peninsularis Becc.; Licuala horrida Blume; Licuala pilearia (Lour.) Blume; Licuala ramosa Blume

= Licuala spinosa =

Species of palm

Licuala spinosa, also known as the mangrove fan palm, is a species of palm in the genus Licuala. The plant is native to the wet places of fresh and salt water of Southeast Asia.

== Botany ==
Mangrove fan palms grow up to 2 to 7 m (6.6 to 23.0 ft) high, with a trunk of 4-7 cm. It may grow in clumps. It prefers full sun, a lot of water, and is more cold hardy than most Licuala species.

== Uses ==
A Cambodian name for L. spinosa is pha'aw, in that region its leaves are used to make hats and wrap food. Its heart and terminal bud prepared as a vegetable are appreciated by Cambodians. In traditional Cambodian medicine, both a febrifuge remedy and for a preparation for the health of the foetus, use the root of the palm in compounds, while the bark of the trunk is used to treat tuberculosis.

== Gallery ==
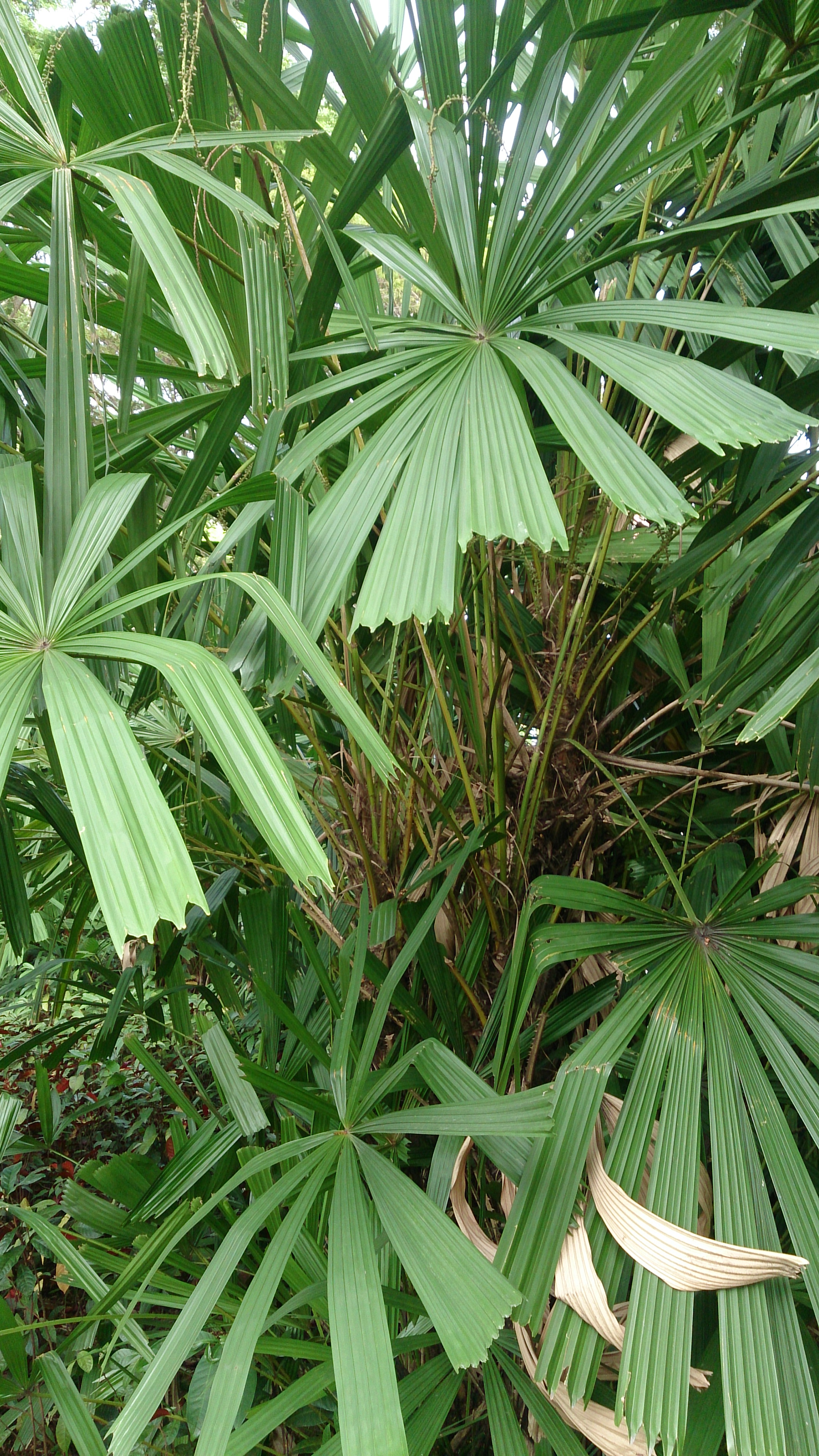

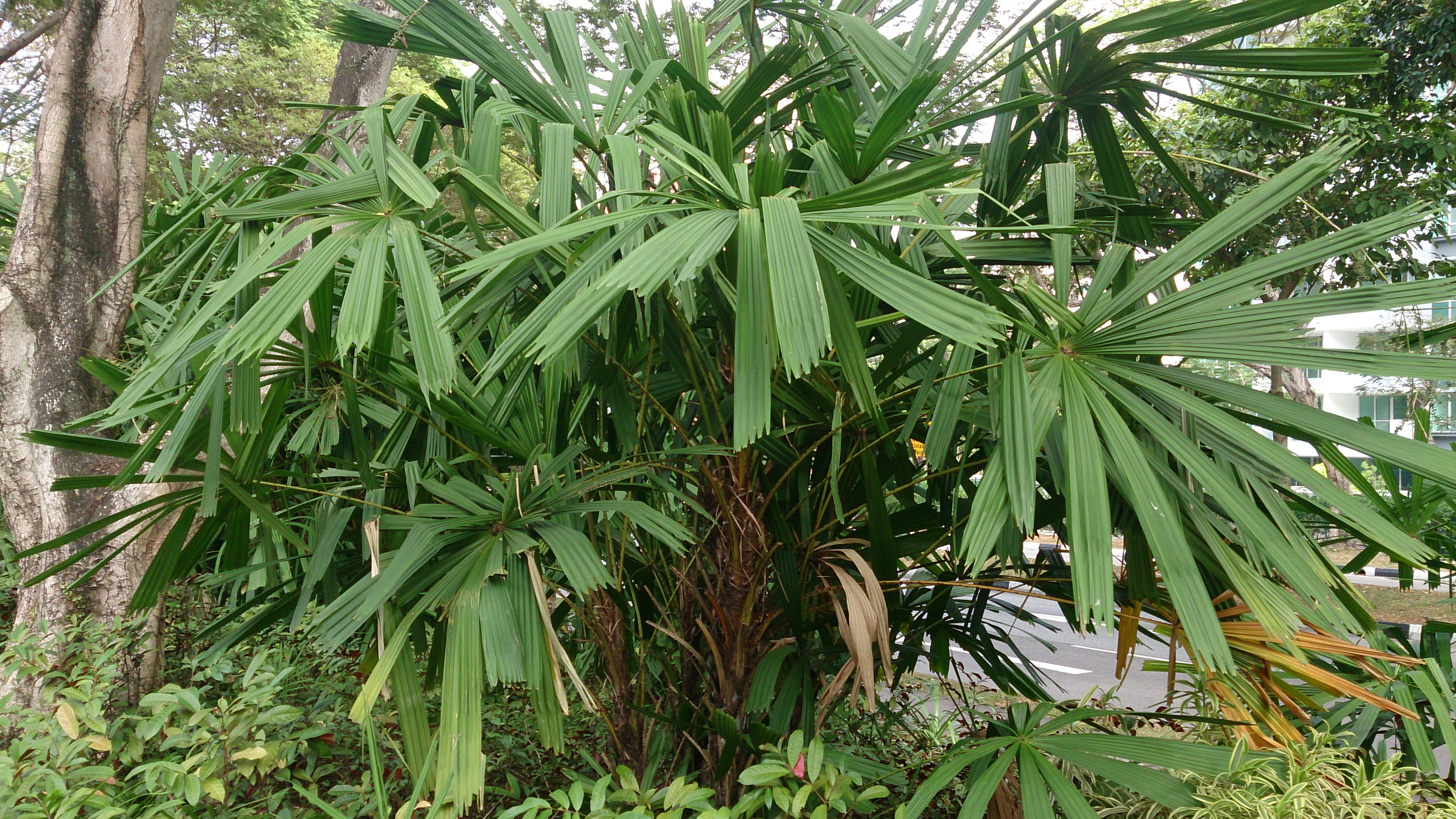

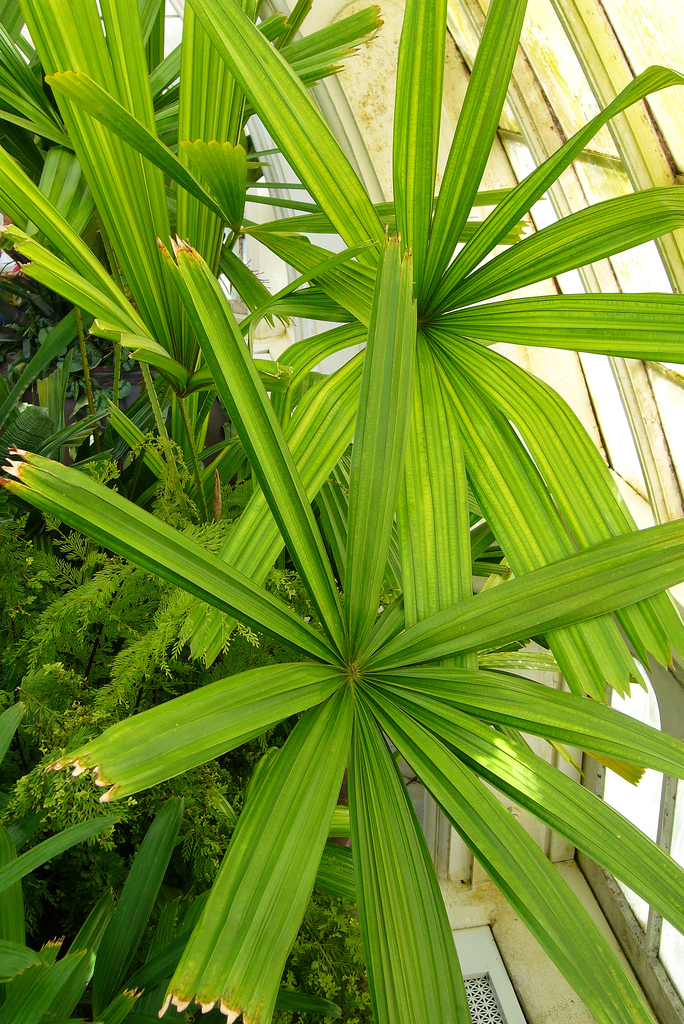
conservatory specimen

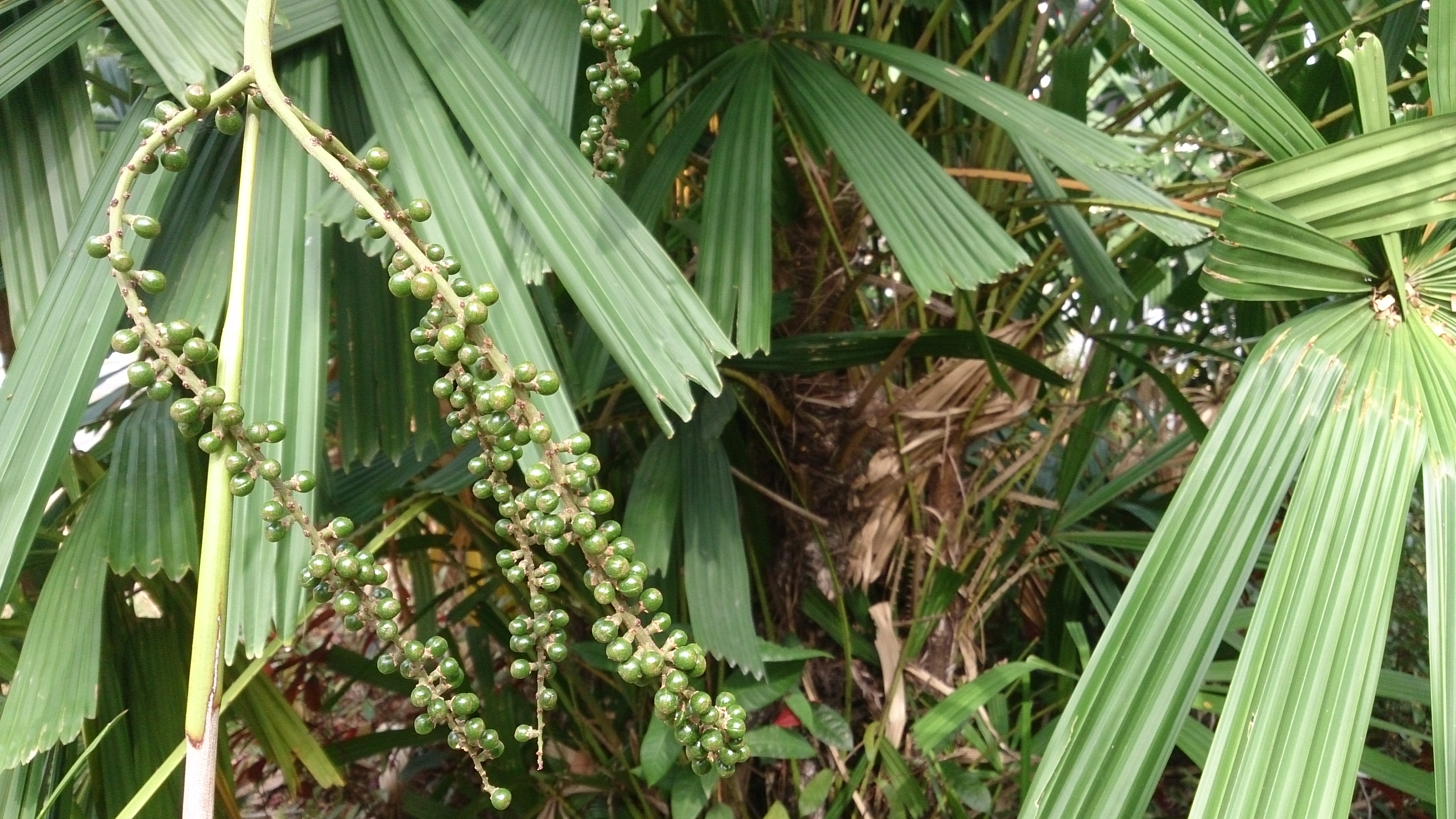
