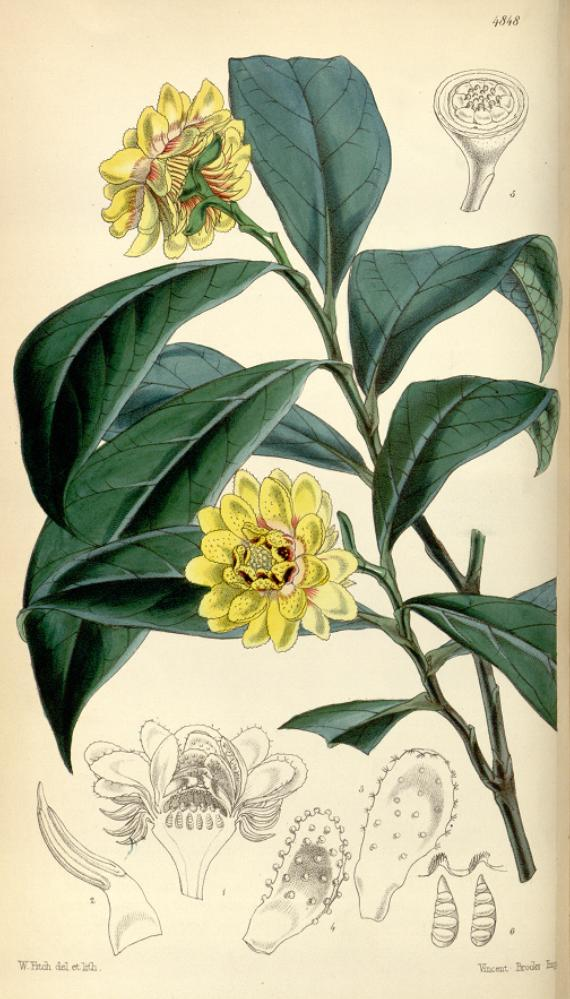
- 1855 illustration of Eupomatia bennettii

Scientific classification
- Kingdom: Plantae
- Clade: Embryophytes
- Clade: Tracheophytes
- Clade: Angiosperms
- Clade: Magnoliids
- Order: Magnoliales
- Family: Eupomatiaceae
- Genus: Eupomatia; R.Br.

Type species
- Eupomatia laurina

Species
- Eupomatia barbata Jessup; Eupomatia bennettii F. Muell.; Eupomatia laurina R. Br.

= Eupomatia =

Genus of flowering plants

Eupomatia is a genus of three species of plants in the ancient family Eupomatiaceae, and is the sole genus in the family. Eupomatiaceae is recognised by most taxonomists and classified in the plant order Magnoliales. The three described species are shrubs or small trees, native to the rainforests and humid eucalypt forests of eastern Australia and New Guinea. The type species Eupomatia laurina was described in 1814 by Robert Brown.

== Description ==
Plants of this family are evergreen shrubs or small trees. The leaves are simple and alternate, without hairs or stipules, and may be distichous or spirally arranged. Leaf blades are somewhat leathery, with pinnate venation (with a midrib and pairs of veins branching off on either side) and entire (not toothed) margins. Tertiary venation is reticulate, i.e. net-like.

The flowers are fragrant, bisexual, axillary or terminal, usually single but occasionally in clusters of 2 or 3. They are initially fully covered by a cap known as a calyptra. The perianth (i.e. petals and sepals) is absent. Female parts mature before the males parts. Stamens and staminodes are numerous and petal-like, arranged in a spiral following the Fibonacci sequence, and detaching as a whole after maturity. The ovary is inferior, locules are numerous, style is absent and the stigma sessile.

The fleshy fruit is an aggregate and berry-like with numerous seeds. The endosperm is ruminate (i.e. grooved or wrinkled).

== Systematics ==
The APG IV system of 2016 places this family in the order Magnoliales under the clade magnoliids, where it has been through the history of the Angiosperm Phylogeny Group. It is most closely related to the family Annonaceae. The Angiosperm Phylogeny Website also considers Eupomatiaceae a sister group of the family Annonaceae in the terminal clade in the order's evolution.

- Magnoliidae
  - - Canellales
    - Piperales
  - - - Magnoliales
        - Myristicaceae
        - - Magnoliaceae
          - - - Degeneriaceae
              - Himantandraceae
            - - Eupomatiaceae
              - Annonaceae
    - Laurales

== Species ==
As of 9 November 2023, Eupomatia contains the following three species.

- Eupomatia barbata Jessup – northeastern Queensland
- Eupomatia bennettii F. Muell. – northeastern New South Wales and southeastern Queensland
- Eupomatia laurina R. Br. – eastern Australia and New Guinea

The species occur in tropical and subtropical rainforests

== Ecology ==
Protogynous and autocompatible flowers, with a reduction in selfing through herkogamy, diurnal synchronization of anthesis and the tendency of the same plant to not flower on two consecutive days. Anthesis lasts one or two days, at the height the flower behaves functionally as a female, showing its gynoecium and with open staminodes, while the stamens remain below the flower. The flower later behaves as a male with the intrastaminal staminodes folded inwards hiding the gynoecium and with erect stamens. The staminodes secrete an oily exudate and emit a fruity smell that attracts beetles, particularly of the genus Elleschodes (Curculionidae), that visit the flowers in both phases, in addition the synandria fall to the ground (cantharophily pollination). The fruit is sweet and aromatic and it is dispersed by birds and mammals (zoochory). The fruit is also eaten by humans.

== Phytochemistry ==
Plants contain unusual lignans and alkaloids (sampangine, eupolauridine, eupomatidine-1, liriodenine and lanuginosine, antimicrobials and antifungals) such as proanthocyanidins, cyanidin and flavonoids, in particular velutin. Iridoids, flavonols and ellagic acid are absent. Cyanogenesis absent.
