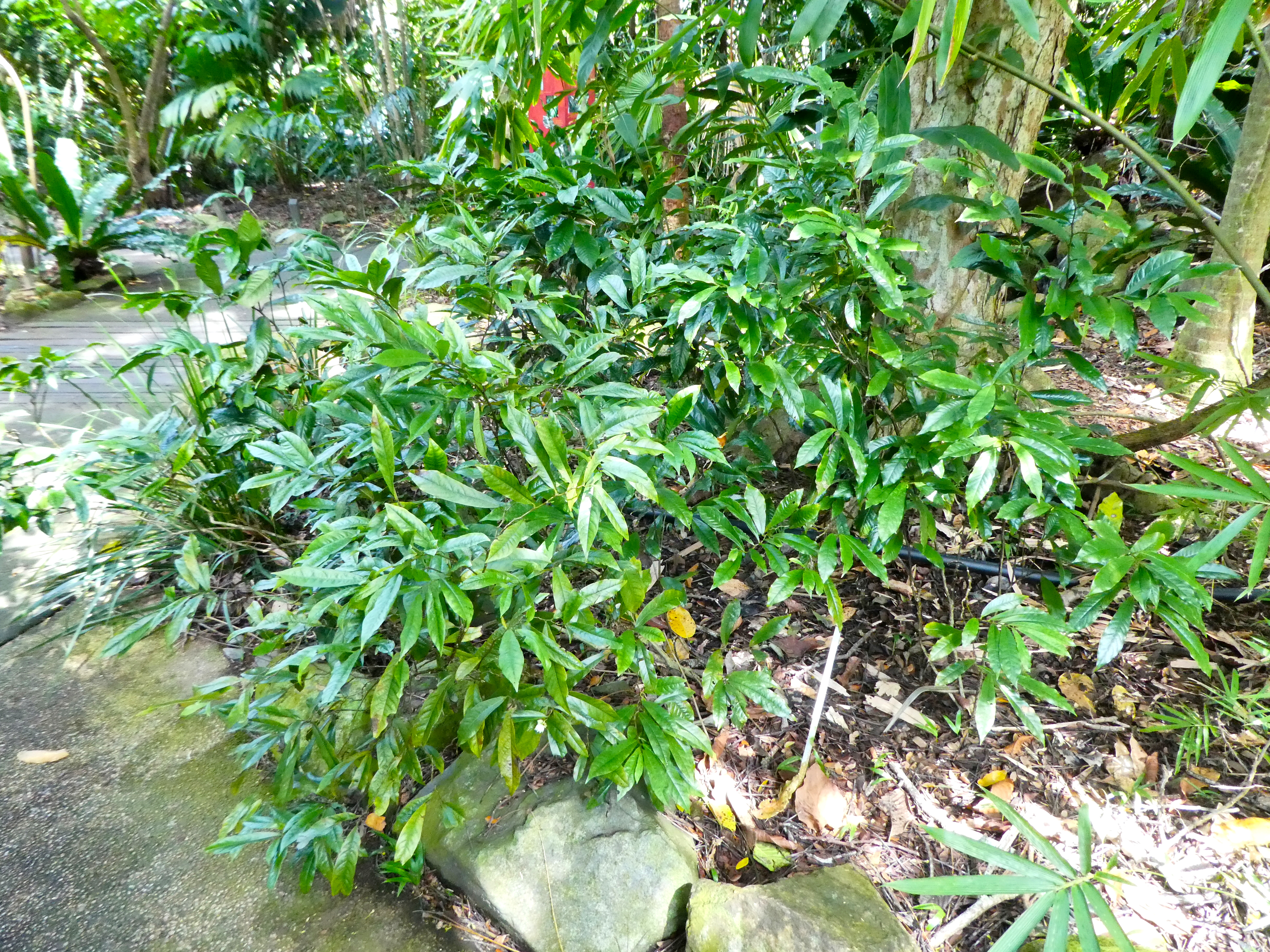
- At Cairns Botanic Gardens

Conservation status
- Least Concern (IUCN 3.1)

Scientific classification
- Kingdom: Plantae
- Clade: Tracheophytes
- Clade: Angiosperms
- Clade: Magnoliids
- Order: Magnoliales
- Family: Eupomatiaceae
- Genus: Eupomatia
- Species: E. barbata

Binomial name
- Eupomatia barbata Jessup

= Eupomatia barbata =

Small bolwarra

Species of flowering plant

Eupomatia barbata, also known as the small bolwarra, is a species of plant in the primitive family Eupomatiaceae. It is endemic to Queensland, Australia, and was first described in 2002.

== Description ==
Eupomatia barbata is a bushy compact shrub growing to about 1 m (3.3 ft) tall. The leaves are arranged alternately on the twigs, and the twigs form a zig-zag pattern from one leaf to the next. The petioles (leaf stalks) are 4 to 6 mm (0.16 to 0.24 in) long with narrow wings that extend along the twigs to the next-lower leaf. The leaf blades are glabrous, up to 20 cm (7.9 in) long by 6 cm (2.4 in) wide, and oblanceolate in shape with a drip tip. They have 16–22 pairs of lateral veins that form distinct loops inside the margin of the leaf.

The flowers are solitary and terminal, and petals and sepals are absent. The developing bud is protected by a green cap (known as an operculum) which splits and detaches when the flower reaches maturity. What appears to me a mass of white petals is numerous staminodes and stamens arranged in several whorls. In the centre of the flower numerous carpels are fused together forming a more-or-less flat disk. The fruit is a botanical berry containing numerous brown or black seeds about 4 mm (0.16 in) long.

== Taxonomy ==
This plant had been collected as far back as 1948, but it wasn't until 2002 that it was formally described and named. The Australian botanist Laurence W. Jessup published his description in the journal of the Queensland Herbarium Austrobaileya.

=== Etymology ===
The genus name Eupomatiaceae comes from the Ancient Greek eu, well or good, and poma, lid or cover. It is a reference to the operculum on the flower buds. The species epithet barbata comes from the Latin word barba, beard, and refers to the fringed margin of the stamens and staminodes.

== Distribution and habitat ==
The small bolwarra inhabits well developed rainforests of coastal and sub-coastal Queensland, from the Cooktown area to just north of Ingham. The altitudinal range is from sea level to about 1,100 m (3,600 ft).

== Conservation ==
As of September 2024, this species is considered to be of least concern by the International Union for Conservation of Nature (IUCN) and by the Queensland Government under its Nature Conservation Act.

== Ecology ==
Flowers of this species (and of the other two species of Eupomatia) are pollinated by weevils of the genus Elleschodes, and the weevils have only ever been observed on Eupomatia flowers. Additionally, no other pollinators have ever been observed on Eupomatia flowers.

== Gallery ==
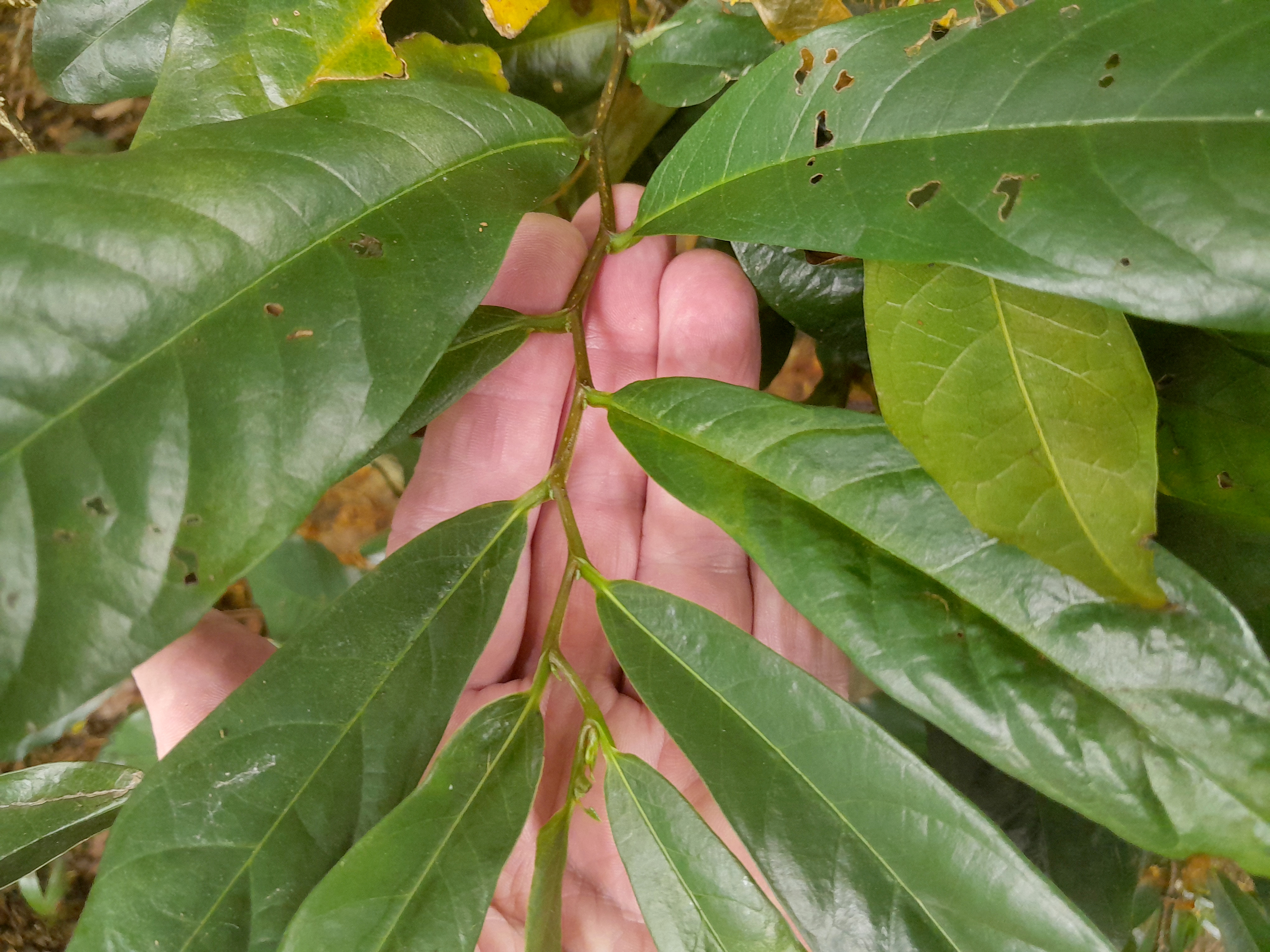
"Zig zag" twigs

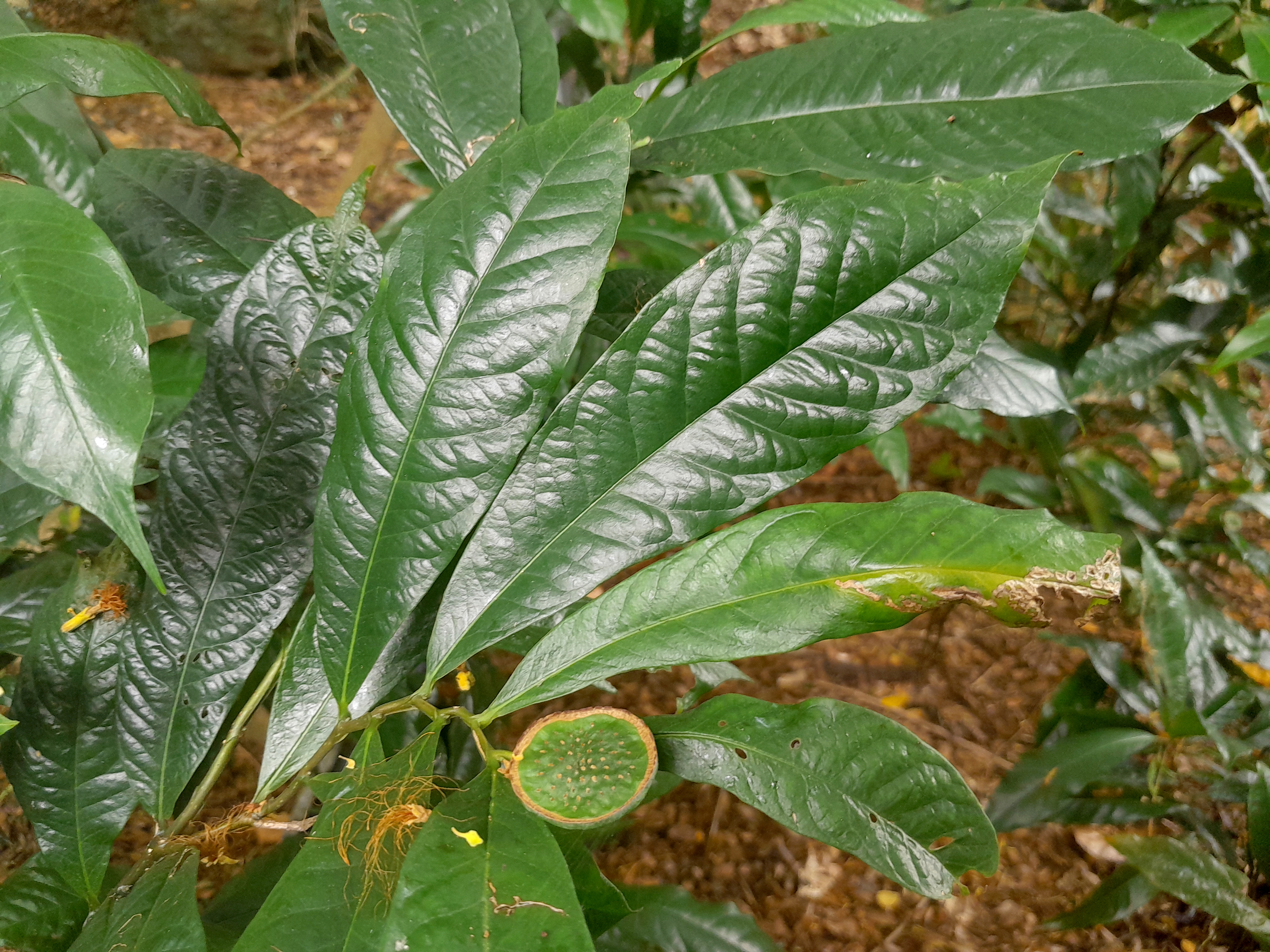
Foliage and a fruit

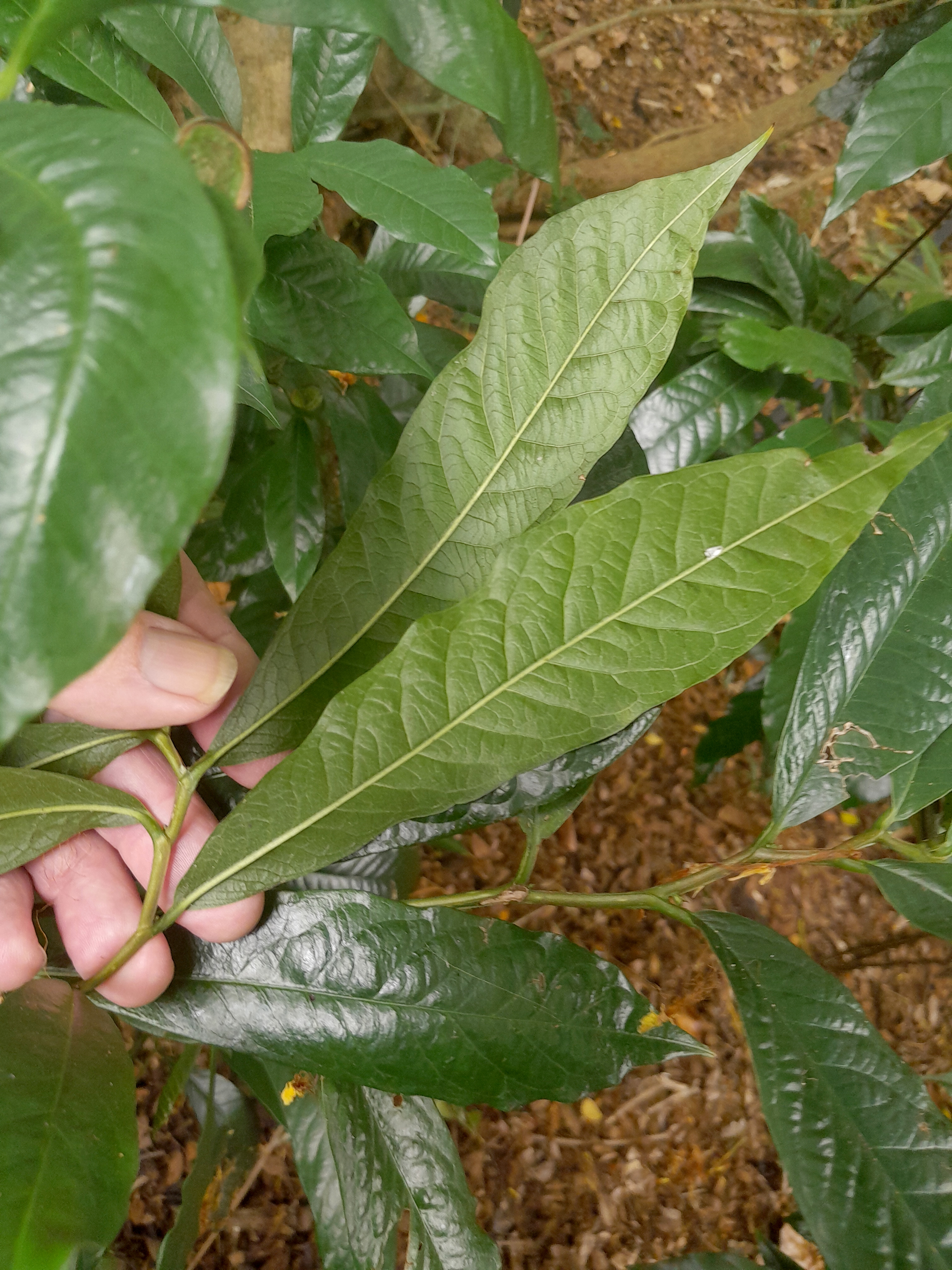
Foliage (underside)

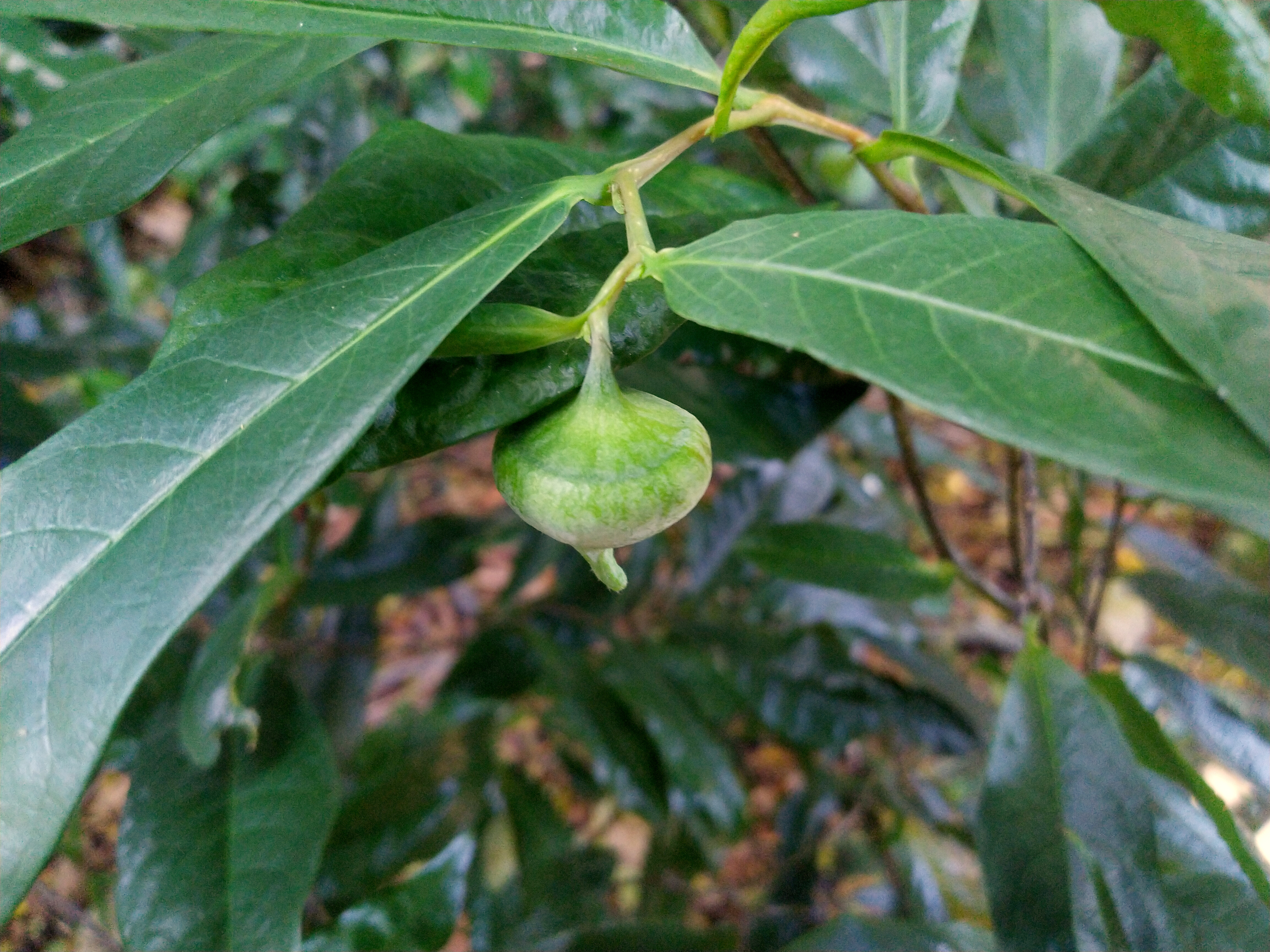
Flower bud with operculum still attached

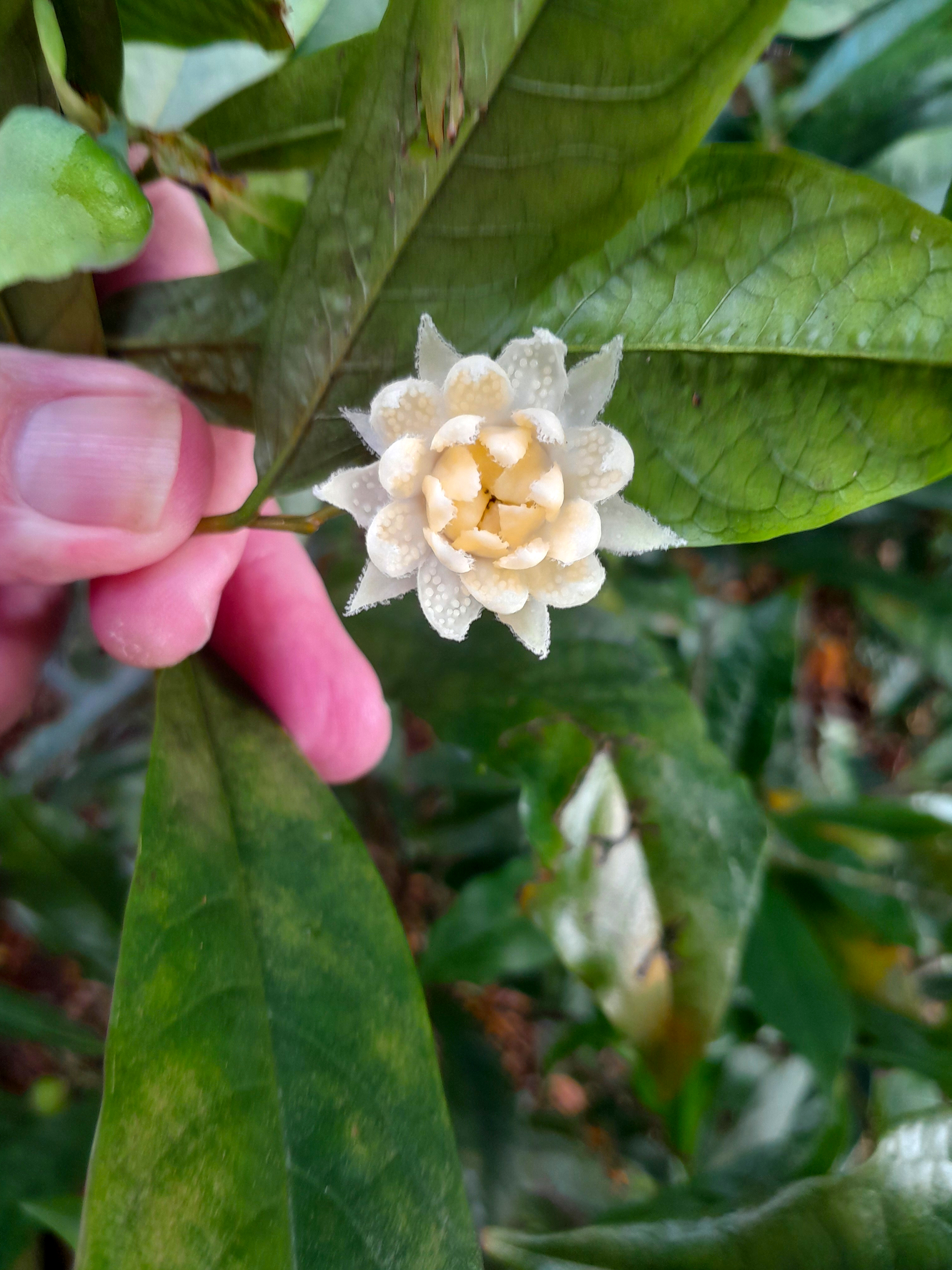
Flower

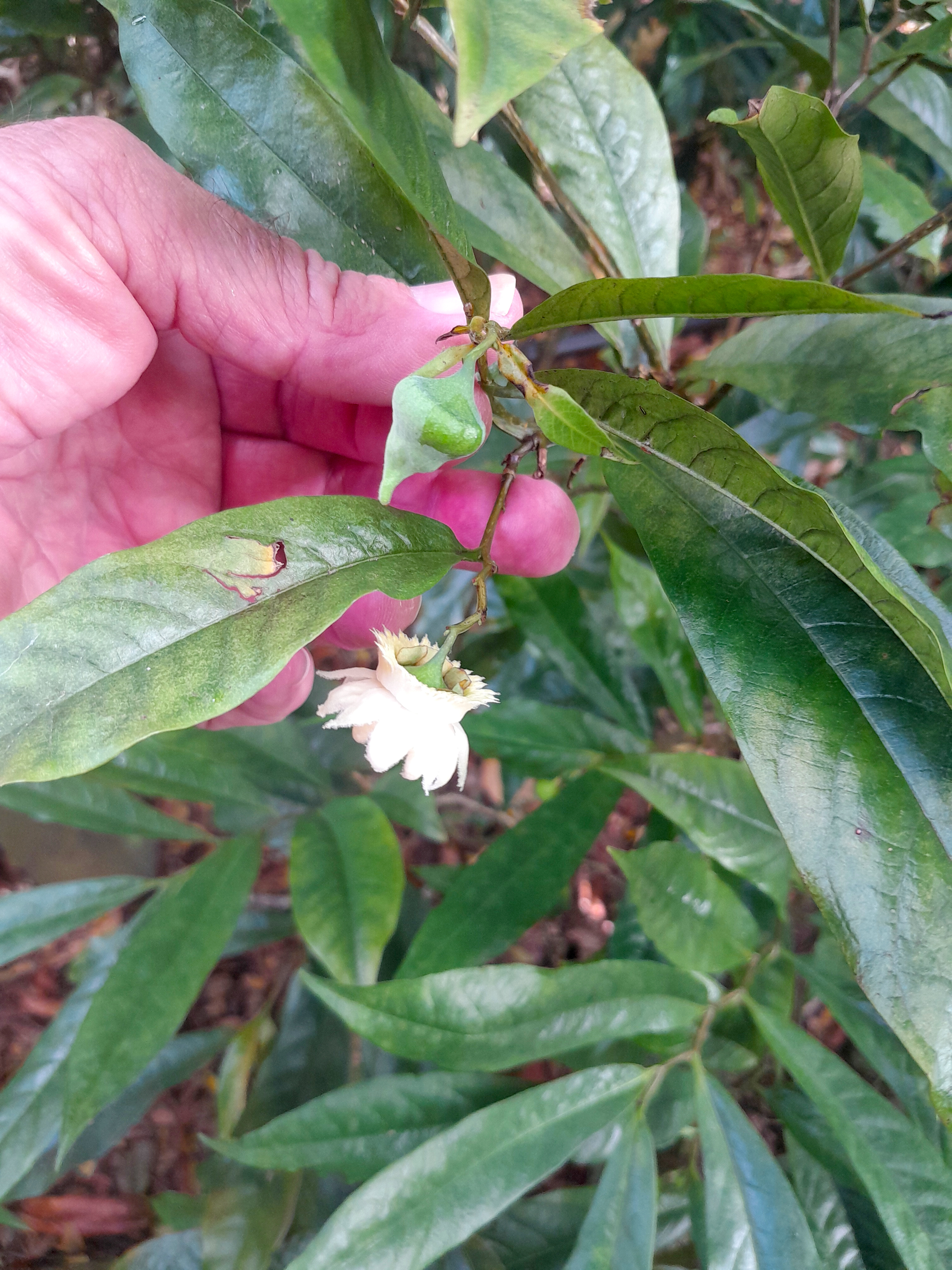
Flower side-on, and a flower bud
