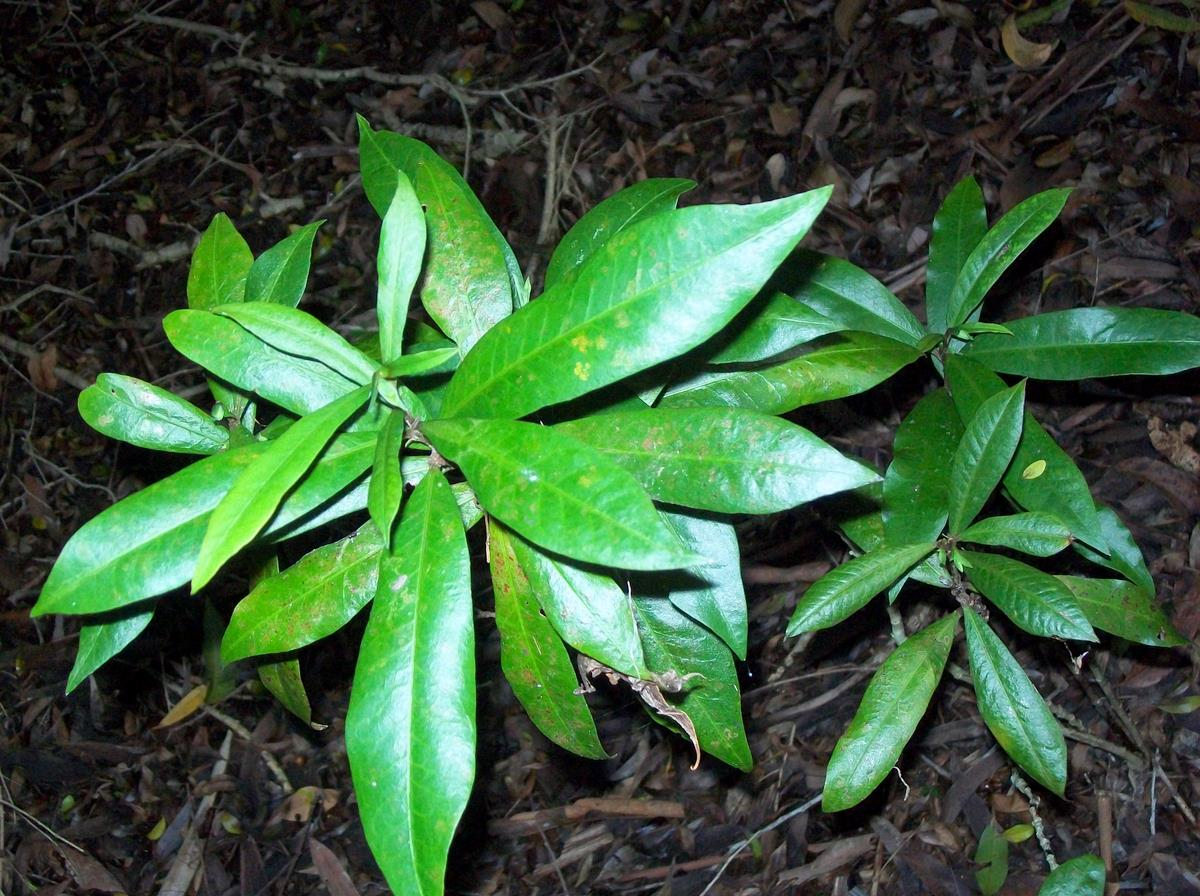

Scientific classification
- Kingdom: Plantae
- Clade: Tracheophytes
- Clade: Angiosperms
- Clade: Magnoliids
- Order: Magnoliales
- Family: Eupomatiaceae
- Genus: Eupomatia
- Species: E. bennettii

Binomial name
- Eupomatia bennettii F.Muell.
- It is native to Queensland and New South Wales

Synonyms
- Eupomatia laurina Hook.

= Eupomatia bennettii =

Species of flowering plant

Eupomatia bennettii, commonly named small bolwarra, is a species of shrubs of the Australian continent ancient plant family Eupomatiaceae, found in sub-tropical rainforest in eastern Australia. They grow naturally north from the Nambucca River and are sometimes found in moist gullies dominated by Eucalyptus trees.

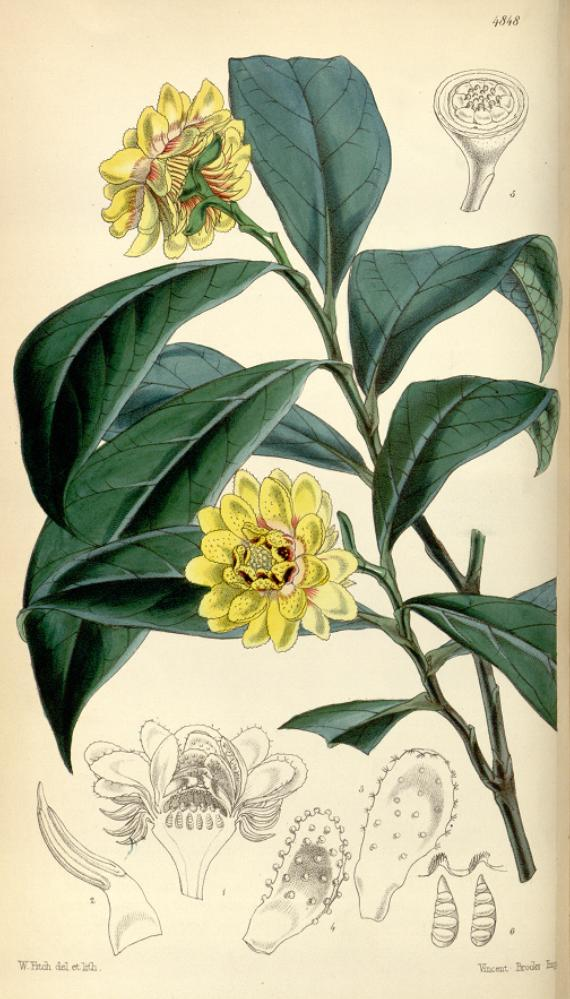
Botanical illustration of Eupomatia bennettii

== Description ==
Usually seen from 70 cm to 140 cm high. Leaves are hairless, reverse lanceolate in shape, 8 to 20 cm long, 2.5 to 5 cm wide.

Attractive cream and red flowers form in spring, 25 mm in diameter. The fruit is an obconical berry; starting green then turning a yellowish colour. 2 to 3 cm in diameter.

== Taxonomy ==
It was described by Ferdinand Jacob Heinrich von Mueller in 1858.

== Distribution and habitat ==
It is native to the wet sclerophyll and notophyll vine forests of Queensland and New South Wales.
