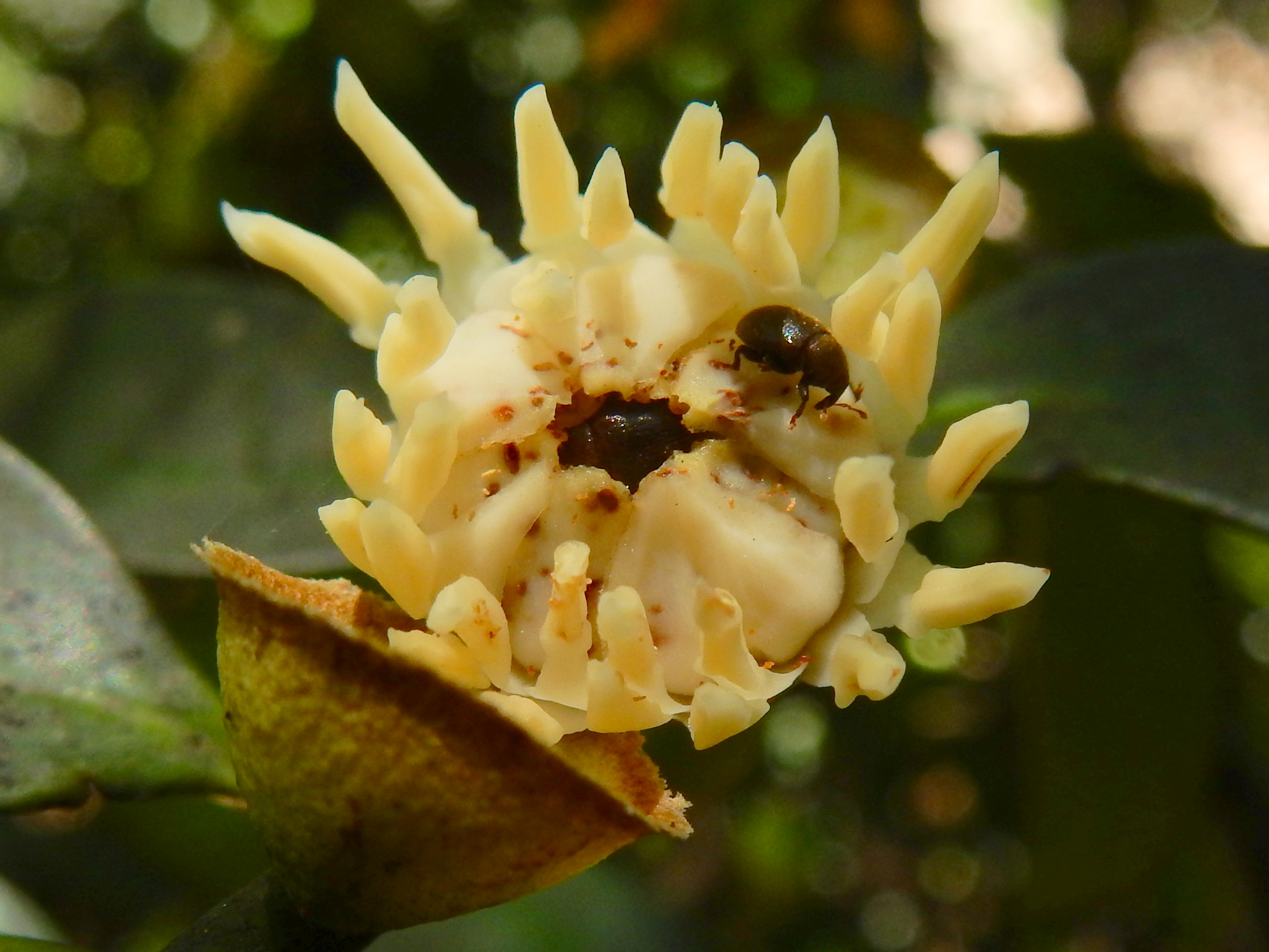
- Weevils on the flower of the bolwarra at Lane Cove, Australia

Scientific classification
- Kingdom: Animalia
- Phylum: Arthropoda
- Clade: Pancrustacea
- Class: Insecta
- Order: Coleoptera
- Suborder: Polyphaga
- Infraorder: Cucujiformia
- Superfamily: Curculionoidea
- Family: Curculionidae
- Genus: Elleschodes
- Species: E. hamiltoni

Binomial name
- Elleschodes hamiltoni Blackburn, 1897

= Elleschodes hamiltoni =

Species of beetle

Elleschodes hamiltoni is a species of true weevil in the beetle family Curculionidae. It is one of the pollinators of the Australian relict plant Eupomatia laurina.
