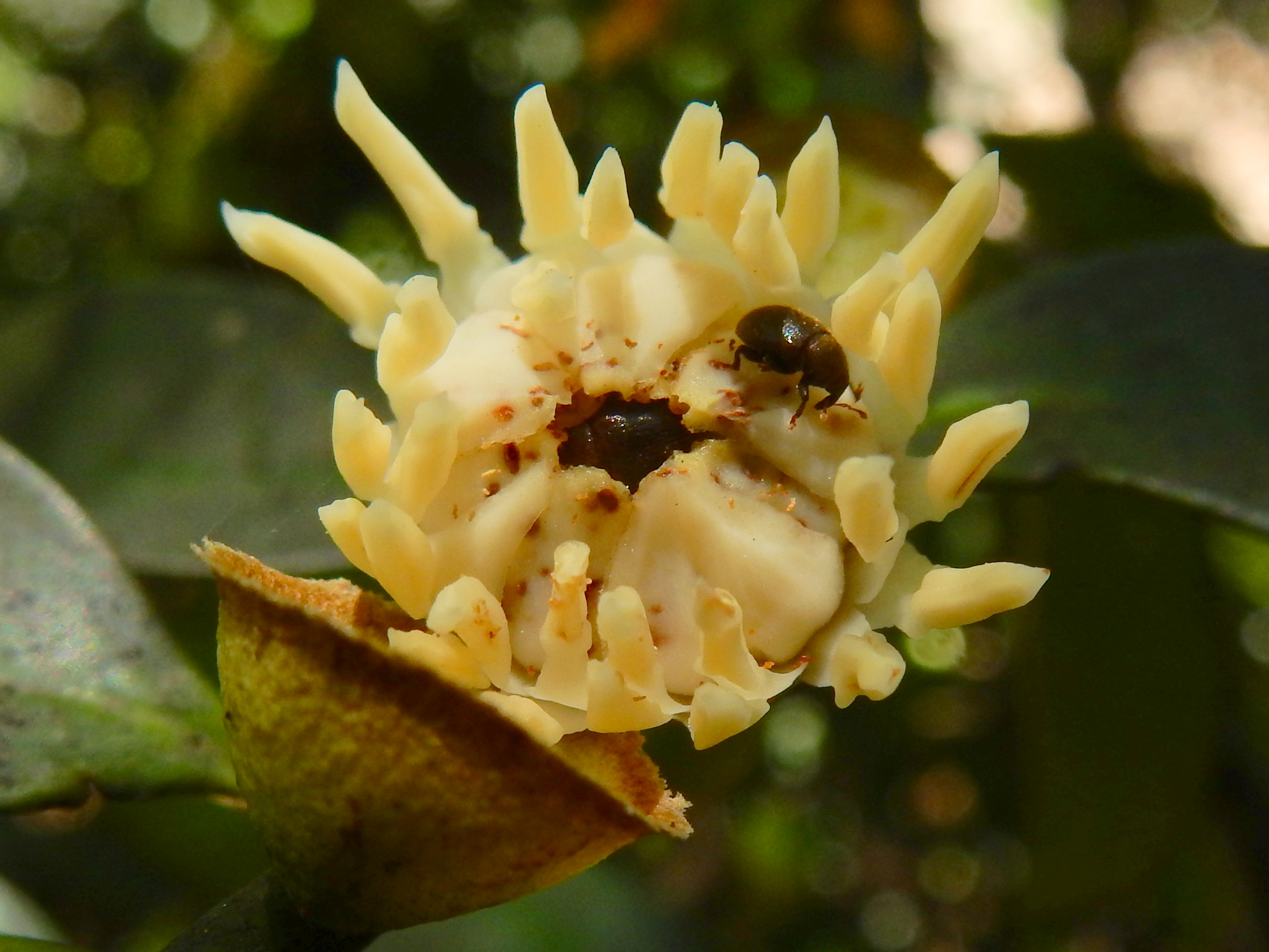
- weevil on Eupomatia laurina

Scientific classification
- Domain: Eukaryota
- Kingdom: Animalia
- Phylum: Arthropoda
- Class: Insecta
- Order: Coleoptera
- Suborder: Polyphaga
- Infraorder: Cucujiformia
- Family: Curculionidae
- Tribe: Storeini
- Genus: Elleschodes; Blackburn, 1897

Species
- See text

= Elleschodes =

Genus of beetles

Elleschodes is a genus of true weevils (family Curculionidae) occurring in Australia, particularly Queensland. Some species are pollinators of trees in the genus Eupomatia.

== Species ==
The genus contains the following species:

- Elleschodes basipennis
- Elleschodes compactus
- Elleschodes ellipticus
- Elleschodes eucalypti
- Elleschodes hamiltoni
- Elleschodes hystricosus
- Elleschodes inconstans
- Elleschodes macrops
- Elleschodes modicus
- Elleschodes nigrirostris
- Elleschodes pallidus
- Elleschodes pictus
- Elleschodes placidus
- Elleschodes rufimanus
- Elleschodes rufulus
- Elleschodes scutellaris
- Elleschodes suturalis
- Elleschodes tenuirostris
- Elleschodes uniformis
- Elleschodes v-albus
