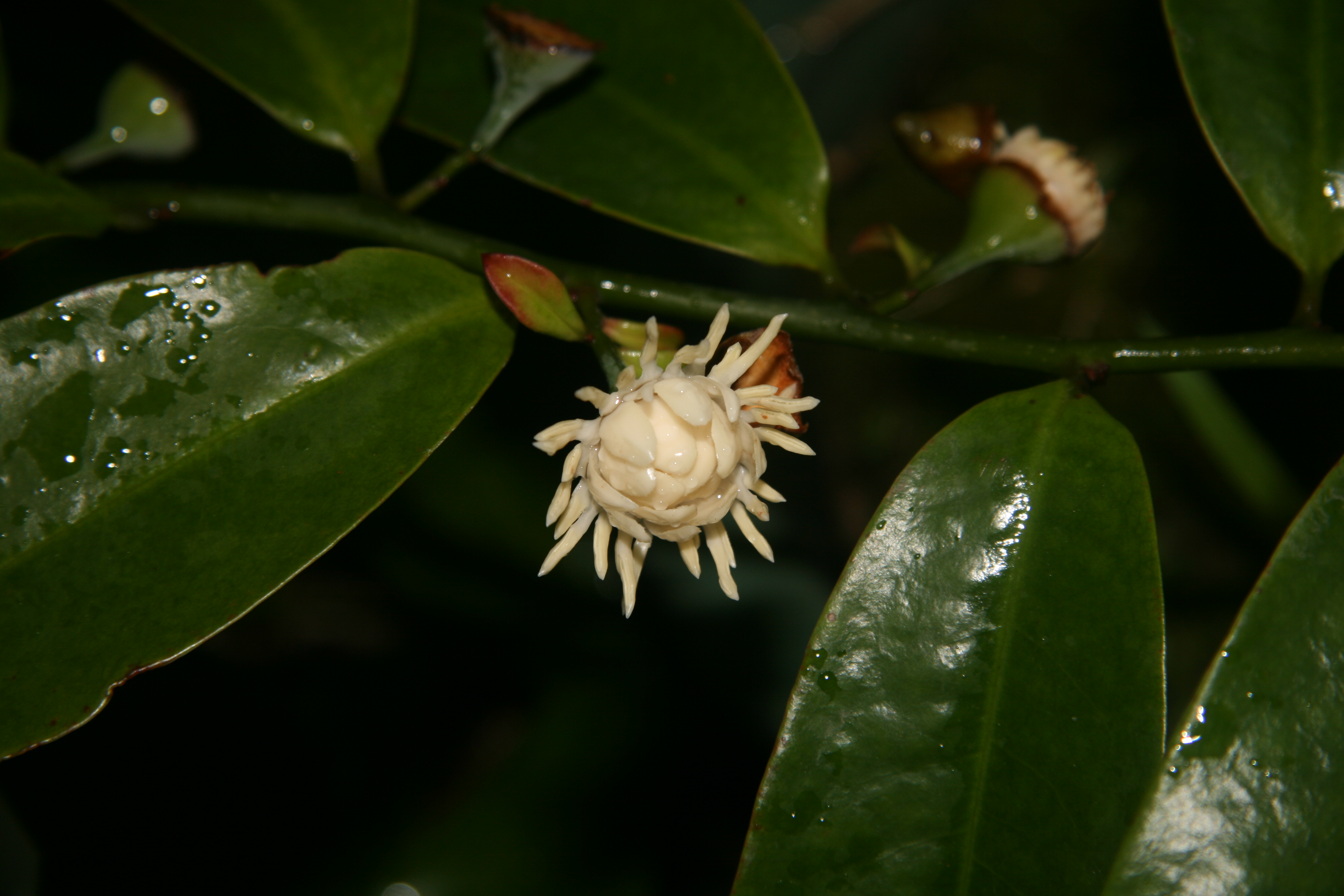
- Bolwarra flowering in cultivation in Sydney

Conservation status
- Least Concern (IUCN 3.1)

Scientific classification
- Kingdom: Plantae
- Clade: Embryophytes
- Clade: Tracheophytes
- Clade: Spermatophytes
- Clade: Angiosperms
- Clade: Magnoliids
- Order: Magnoliales
- Family: Eupomatiaceae
- Genus: Eupomatia
- Species: E. laurina

Binomial name
- Eupomatia laurina R.Br.

= Eupomatia laurina =

Species of flowering plants

Eupomatia laurina, commonly named bolwarra, native guava or copper laurel, is a species of plant in the primitive flowering-plant family Eupomatiaceae endemic to Australia and New Guinea.

== Description ==
It grows to between 3 and 5 m (10 and 16 ft) tall, but larger specimens may attain a height of 15 m (50 ft) and a trunk diameter of 30 cm (12 in). It has glossy, ovate to elliptic leaves, from 5 to 20 cm (2 to 8 in) long. The branches bear globose to urn-shaped fruit which are green in colour and measure 15–20 mm (0.6–0.8 in) in diameter. They yellow when ripe and contain pale-coloured, edible, jelly-like flesh inside, with many non-edible seeds (similar appearance to guava contents).

== Taxonomy ==
This species was first described by the Scottish botanist Robert Brown, based on material collected by himself and other crew members between 1801 and 1803, during the circumnavigation of Australia with Matthew Flinders in HMS Investigator. His work was published as appendix III of volume 2 of Flinders' book A Voyage to Terra Australis.

Brown created the new genus Eupomatia to accommodate this plant, and placed it in the family Annonaceae, but in 1845 the French botanist Charles Henry Dessalines d'Orbigny transferred it to the new family Eupomatiaceae.

== Ecology ==
Flowers are pollinated by small weevils, including Elleschodes hamiltoni and others in the same genus.

== Distribution and habitat ==
In Australia, it is found in humid forests of the east coast, from as far south as Nowa Nowa, Victoria, north through New South Wales and Queensland to Cape York Peninsula. In New Guinea, it is found throughout the island's eastern half (Papua New Guinea). It usually grows as an understory plant in rainforests or humid Eucalyptus forests.

== Horticulture ==
In cultivation E. laurina is frost sensitive and prefers a protected, semi-shaded site. It can be propagated from seed or cuttings. Cutting propagated trees produce fruit after two years. Seedlings take four to six years to fruit. Cuttings are not advised as a method of regeneration. Germination from fresh seed commences after around three weeks and completes after five weeks, with a high rate of germination.

== Gallery ==
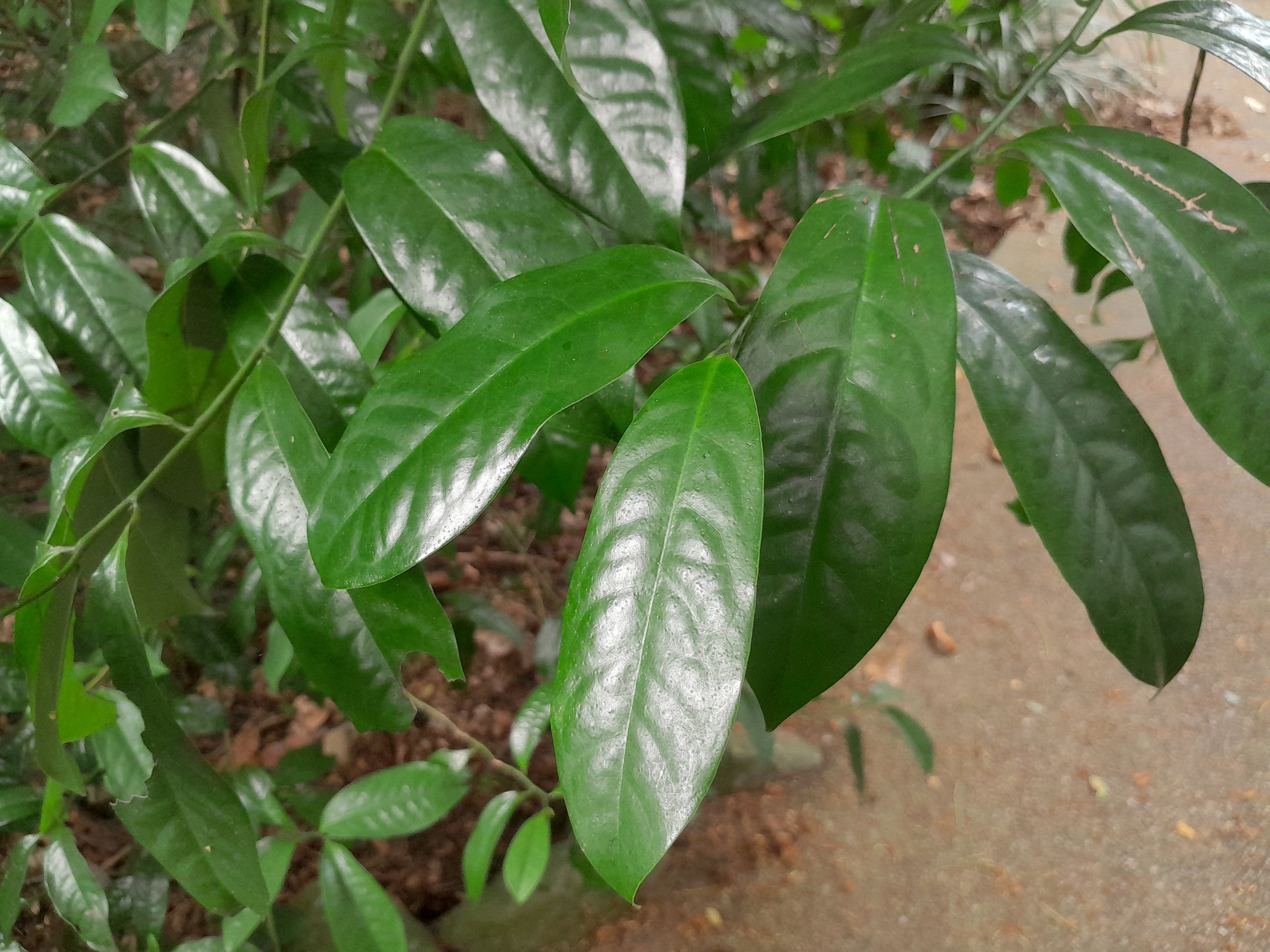
Foliage

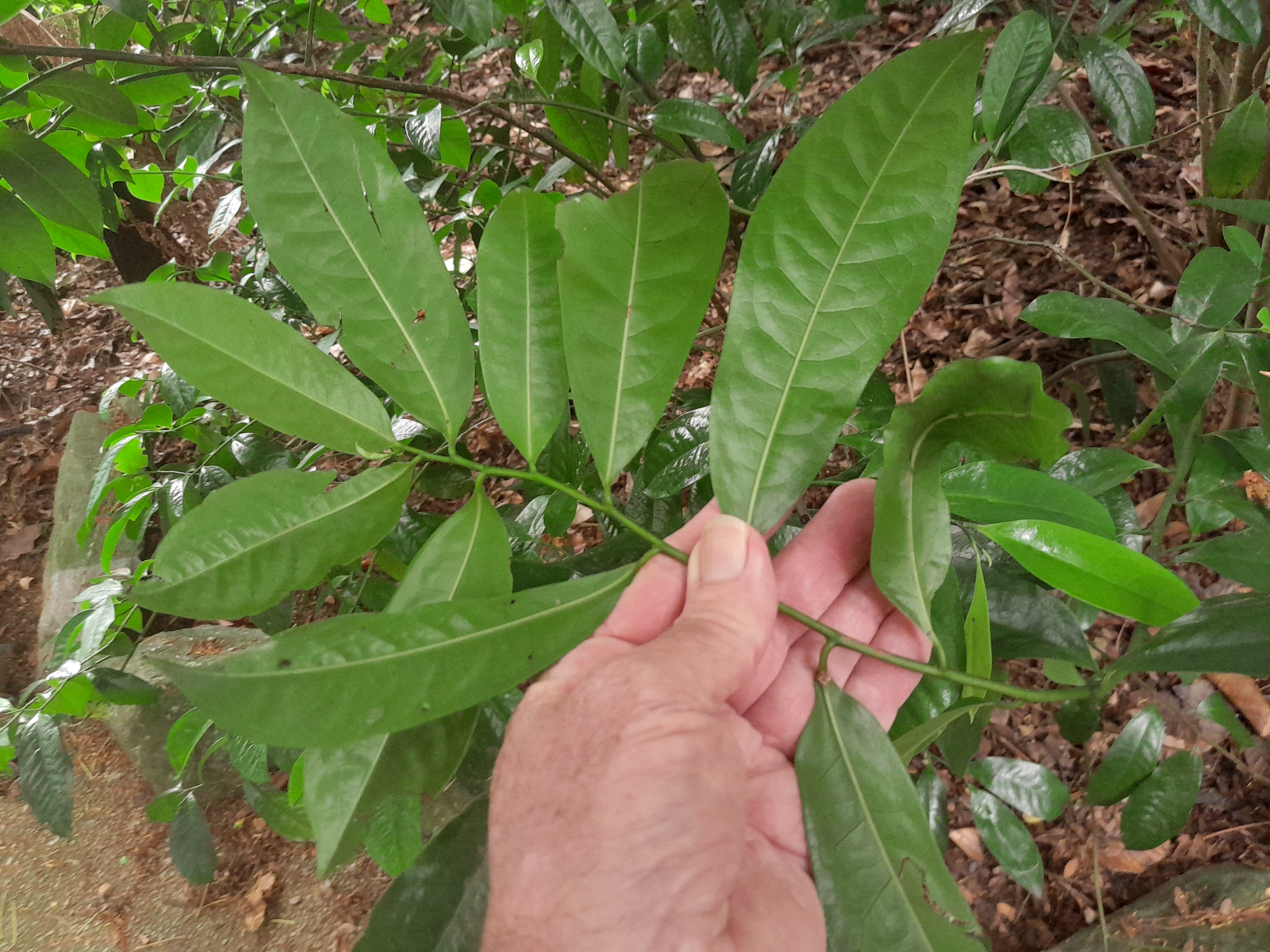
Foliage

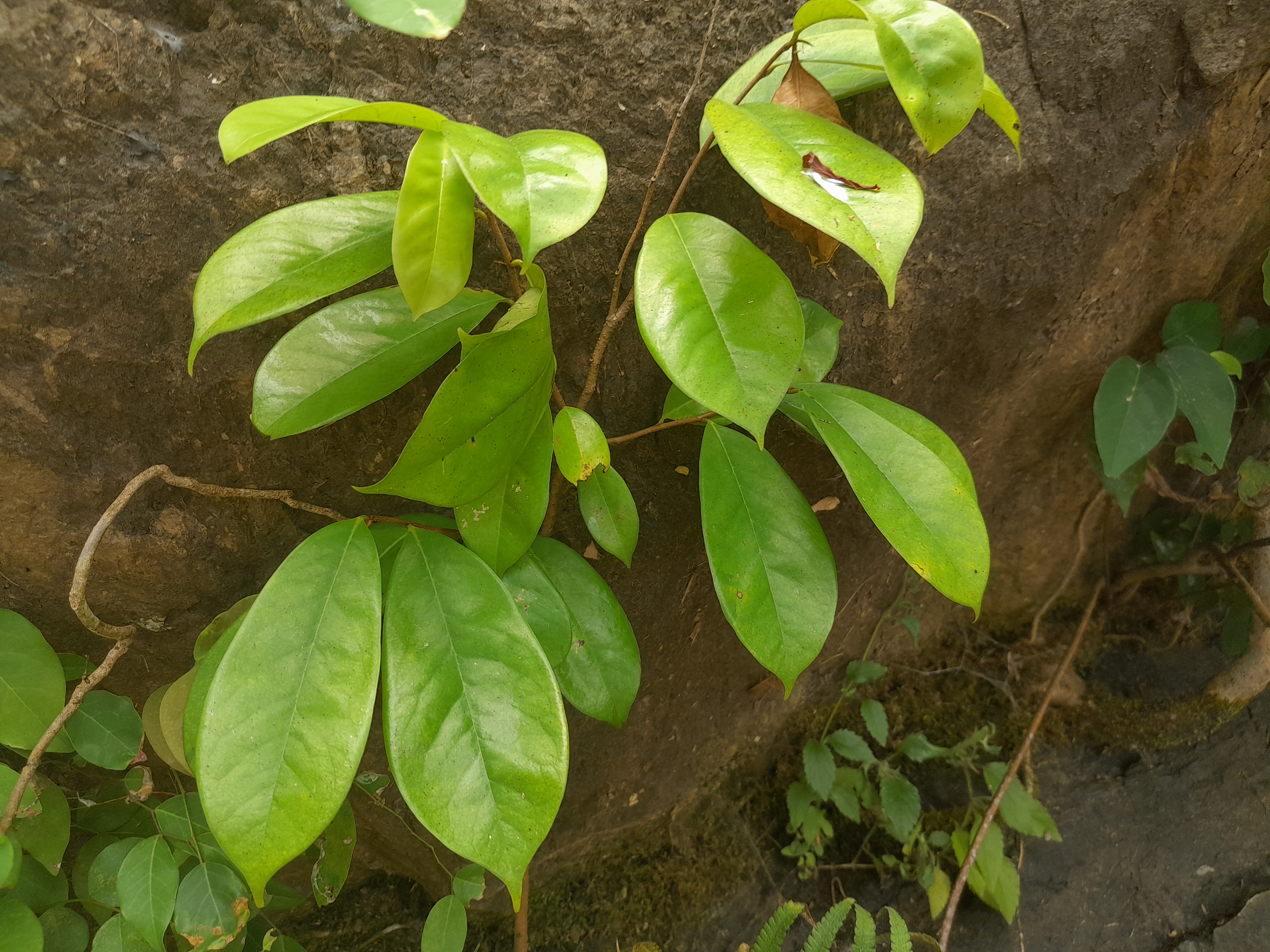
Juvenile plant

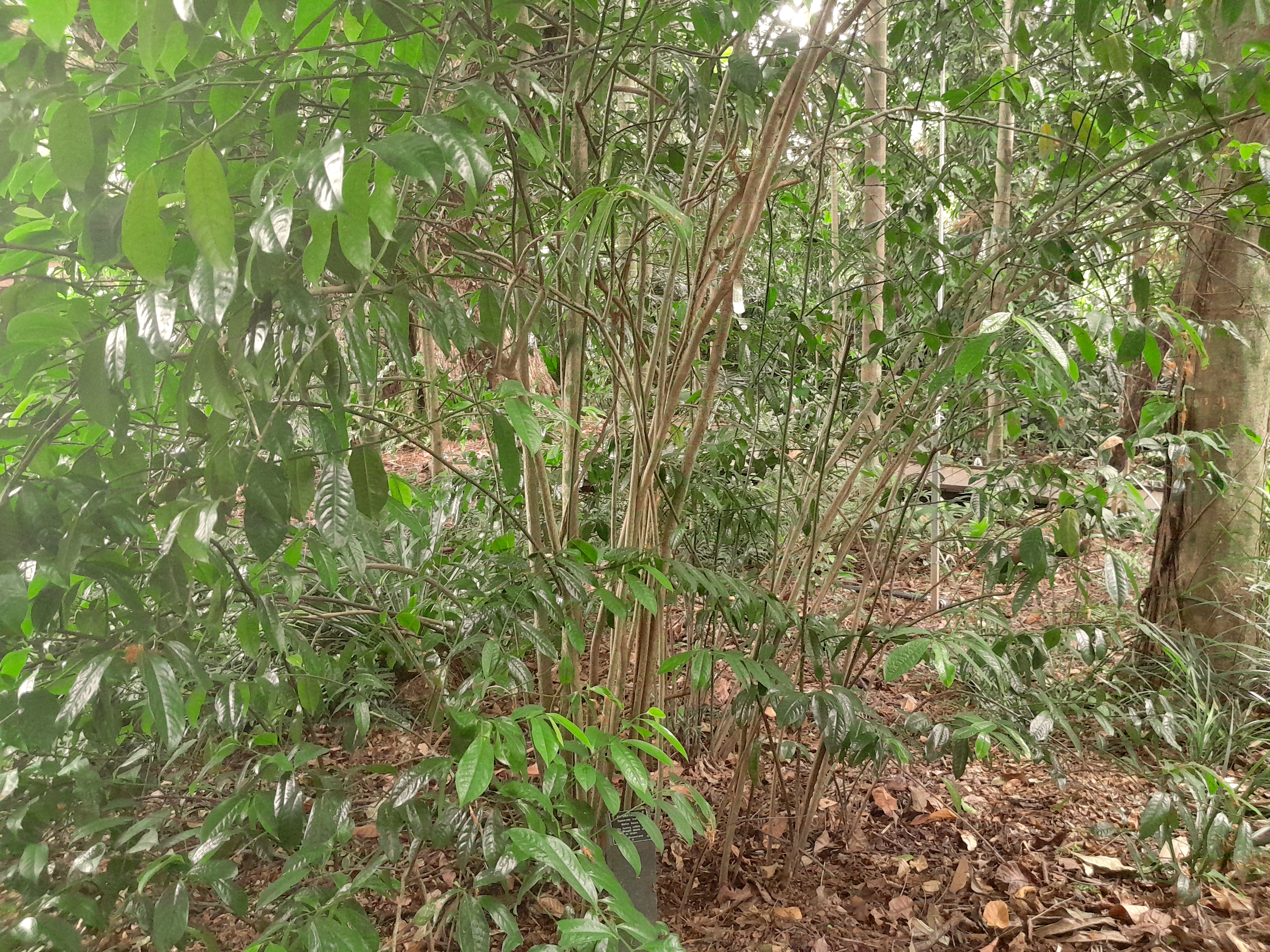
Habit

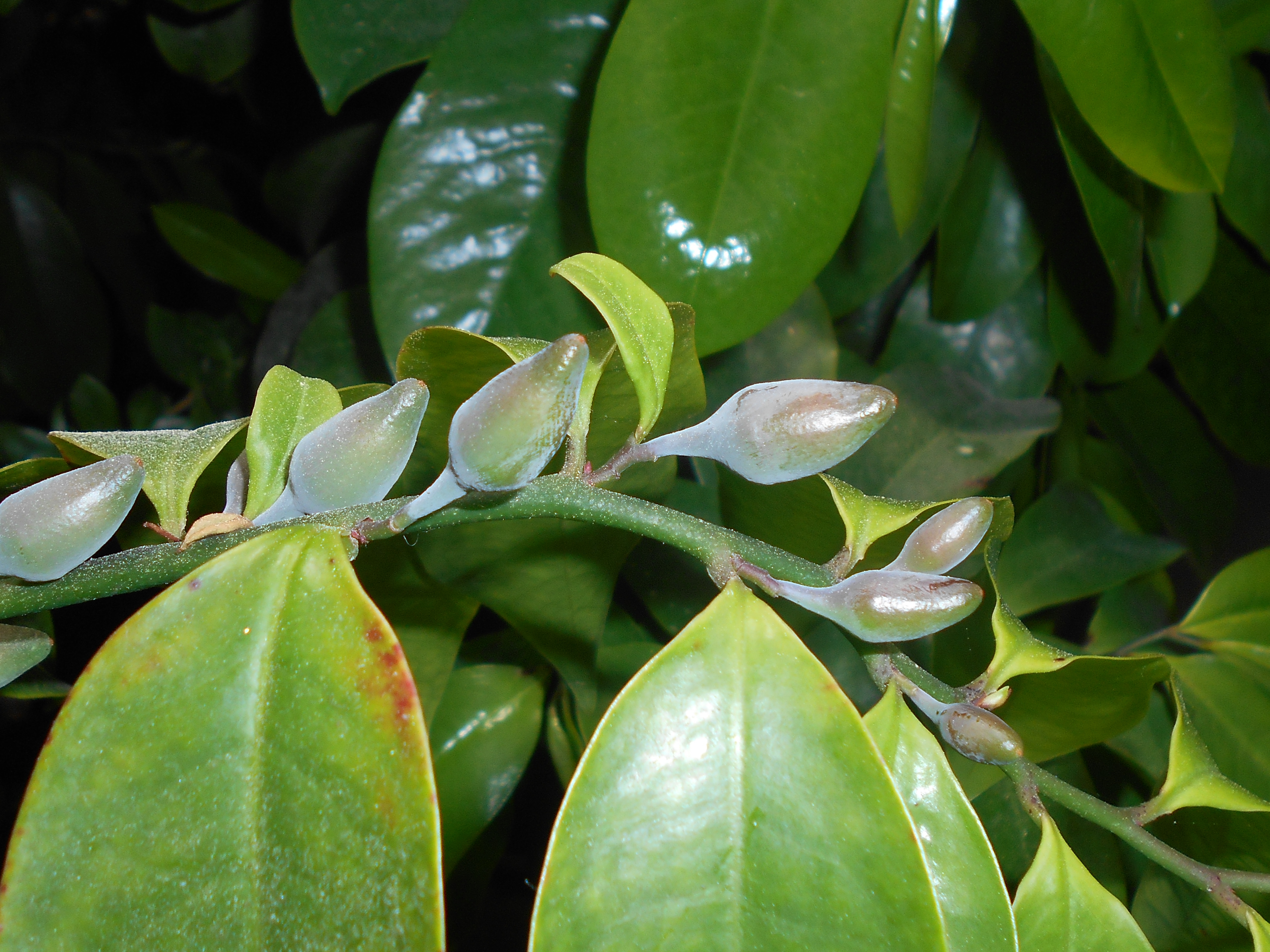
Flower buds

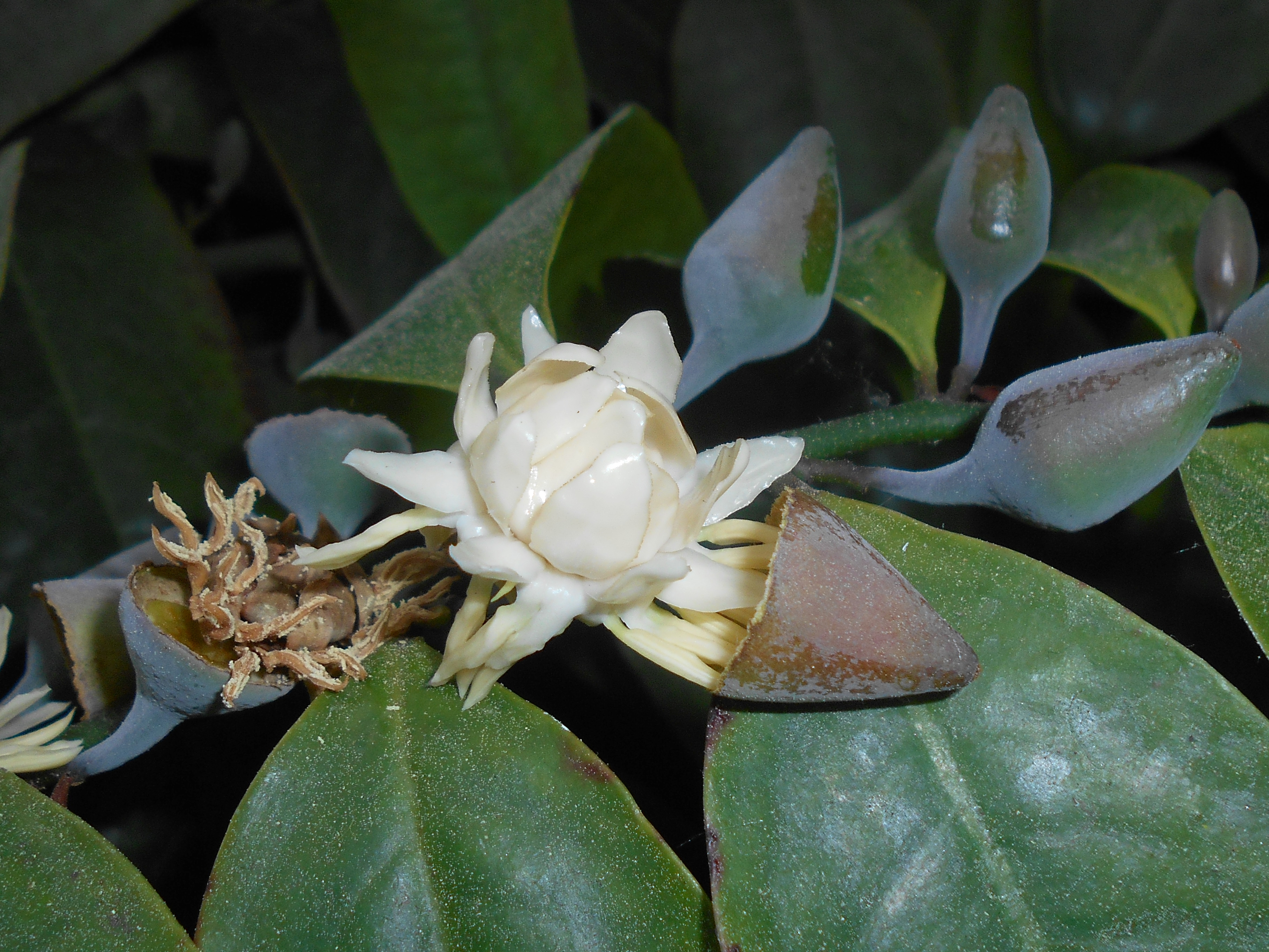
Operculum (the 'cap' of the flower bud) detaching

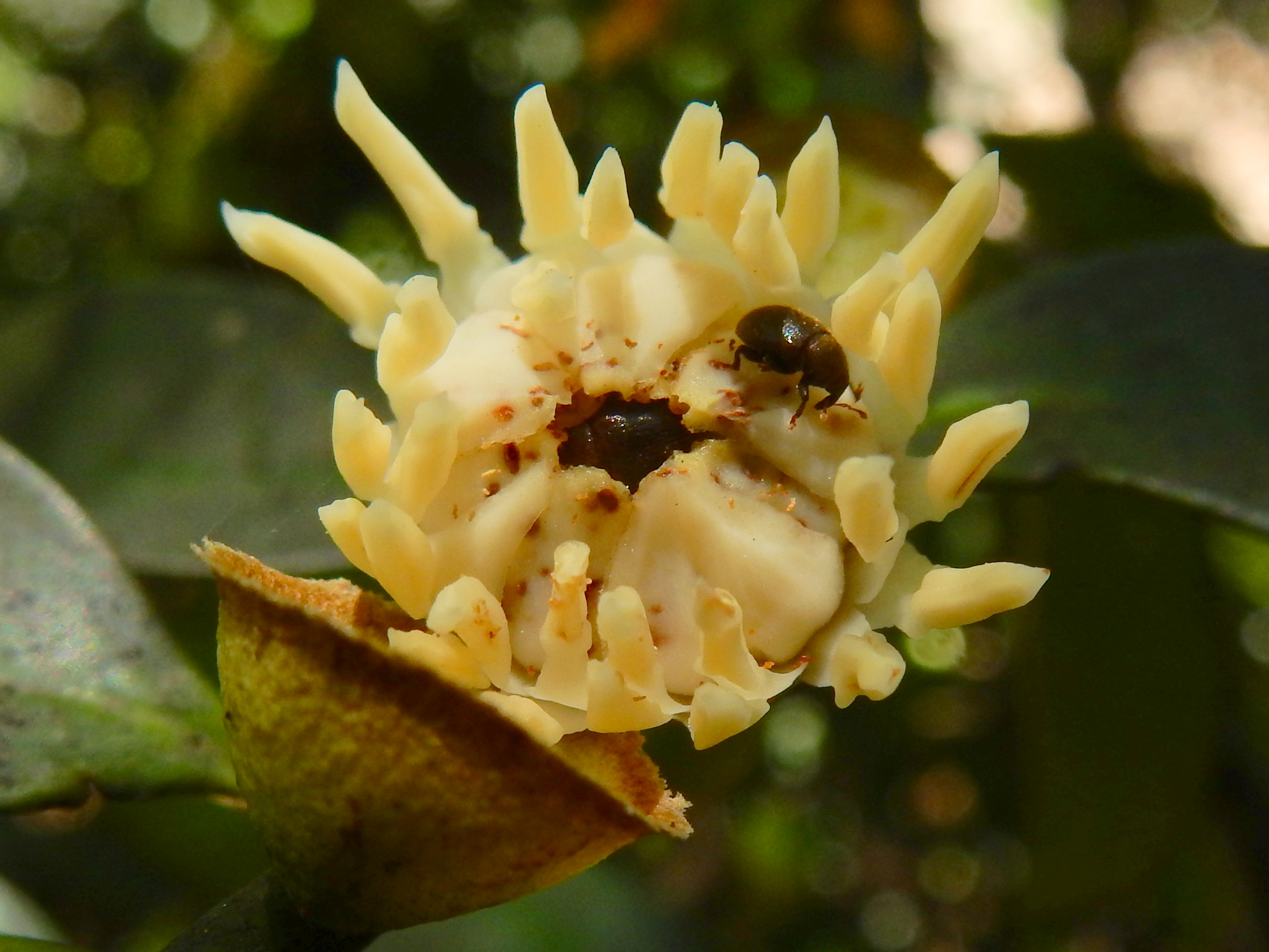
Flower with weevils

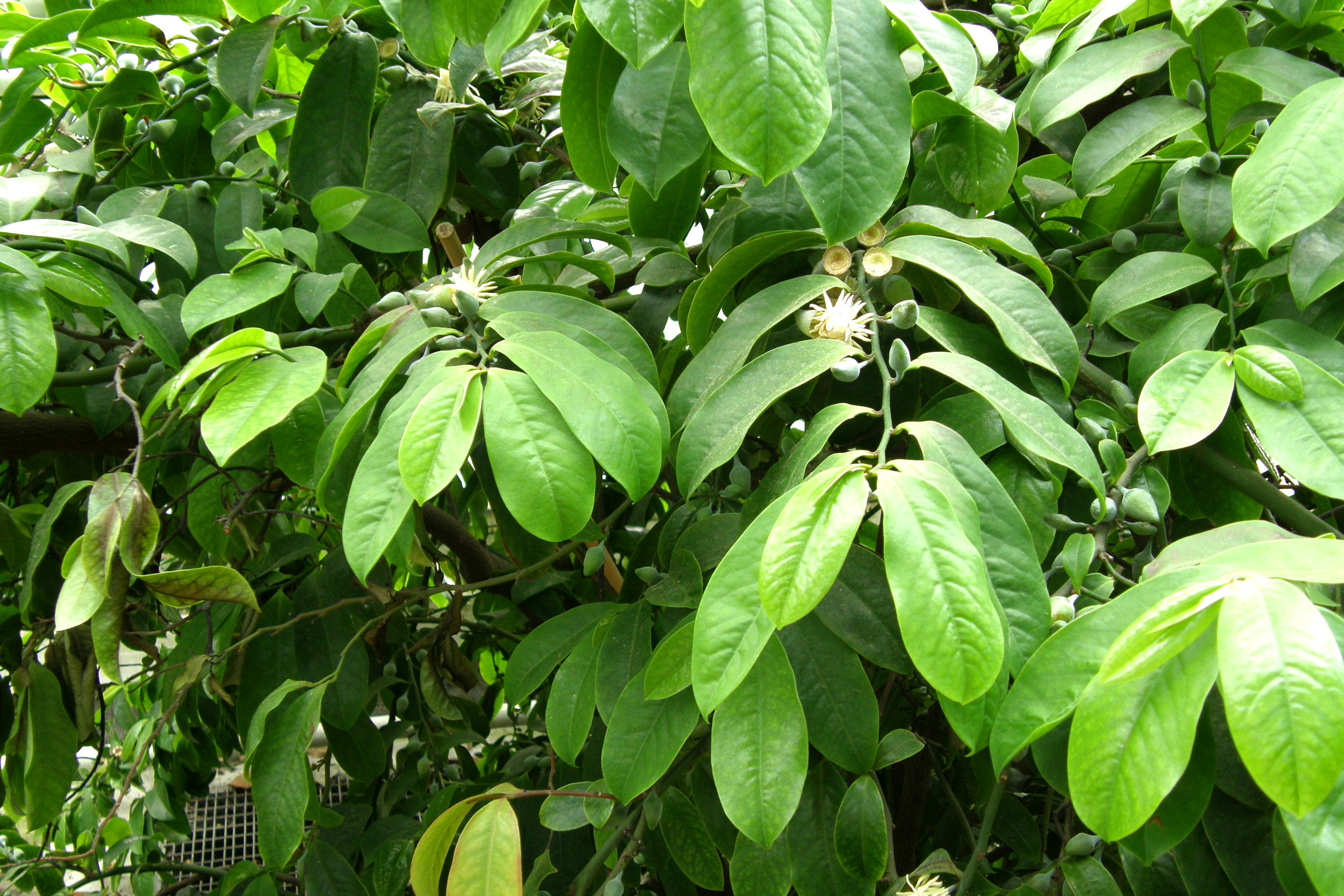
With flowers and buds

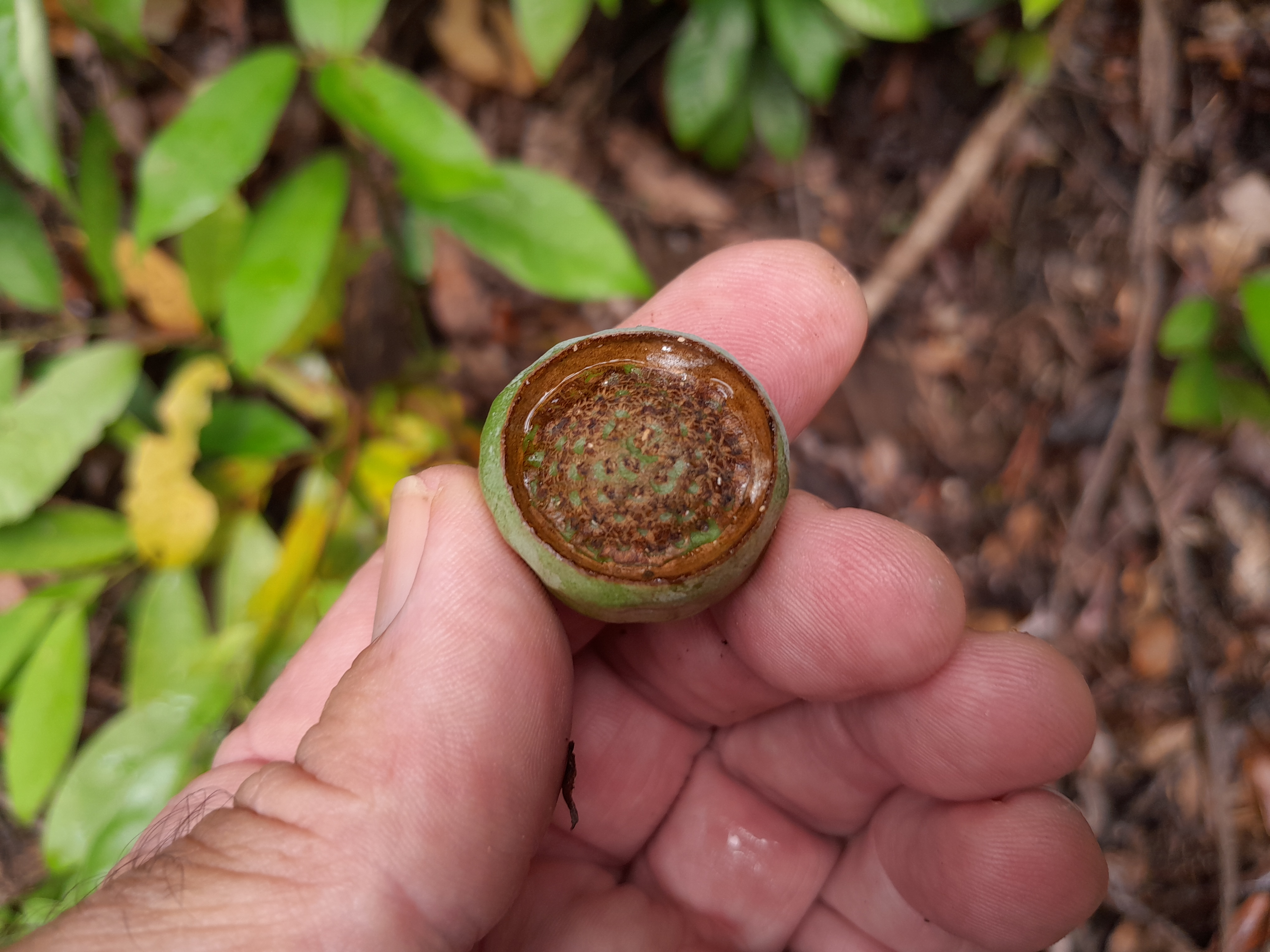
Undeveloped fruit

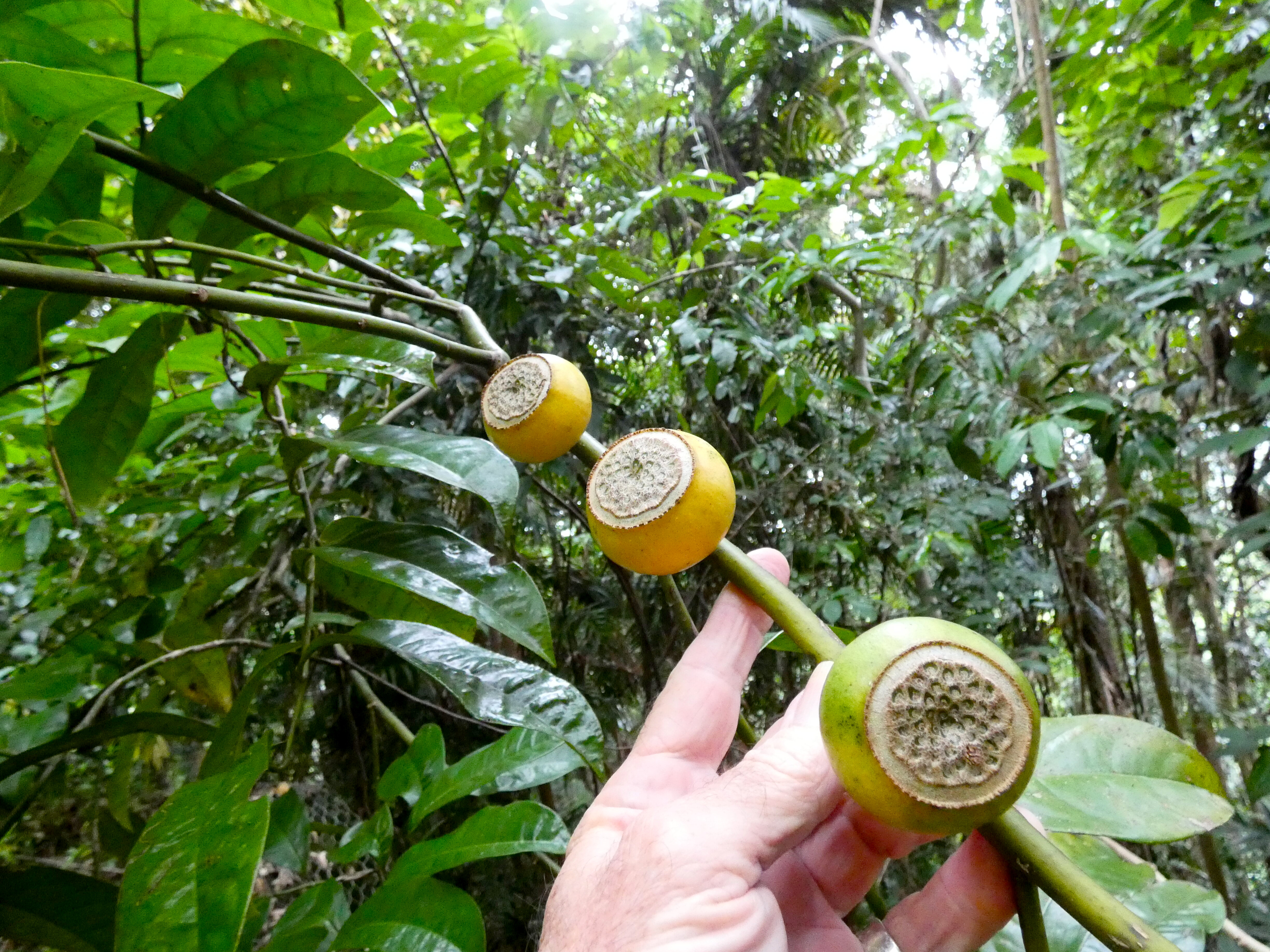
Mature fruit
