= Velutin =

Chemical compound

Names
- IUPAC name 4′,5-Dihydroxy-3′,7-dimethoxyflavone
- Systematic IUPAC name 5-Hydroxy-2-(4-hydroxy-3-methoxyphenyl)-7-methoxy-4H-1-benzopyran-4-one
- Other names Flavoyadorigenin B

Identifiers
CAS Number	25739-41-7
3D model (JSmol)	Interactive image
ChEBI	CHEBI:177047
ChEMBL	ChEMBL508292
ChemSpider	4576639
PubChem CID	5464381
UNII	CT1Q4E0I0W
CompTox Dashboard (EPA)	DTXSID90180421
- InChI: InChI=1S/C17H14O6/c1-21-10-6-12(19)17-13(20)8-14(23-16(17)7-10)9-3-4-11(18)15(5-9)22-2/h3-8,18-19H,1-2H3 Key: ROCUOVBWAWAQFD-UHFFFAOYSA-N; InChI=1/C17H14O6/c1-21-10-6-12(19)17-13(20)8-14(23-16(17)7-10)9-3-4-11(18)15(5-9)22-2/h3-8,18-19H,1-2H3 Key: ROCUOVBWAWAQFD-UHFFFAOYAA
- SMILES: COC1=CC(=C2C(=C1)OC(=CC2=O)C3=CC(=C(C=C3)O)OC)O

Properties
Chemical formula	C_{17}H_{14}O_{6}
Molar mass	314.293 g·mol^{−1}
- Except where otherwise noted, data are given for materials in their standard state (at 25 °C [77 °F], 100 kPa). Infobox references

Velutin is a chemical compound isolated from Xylosma velutina and açaí fruit. It is classified as a flavone.

Velutin has various biological activities, such as skin whitening (anti-melanogenic) effects, as well as potential anti-inflammatory, anti-allergic, antioxidant, and antimicrobial activities.
