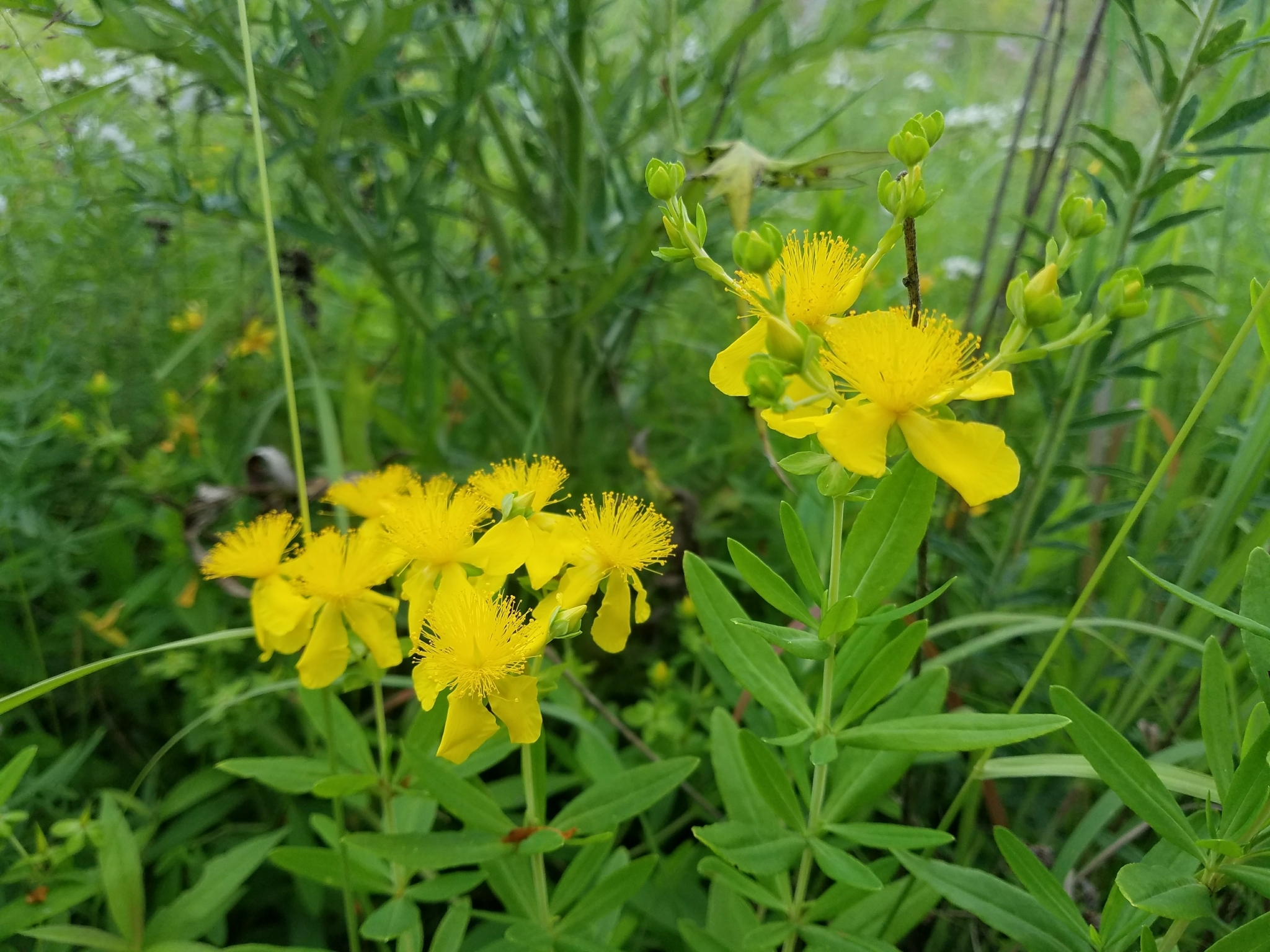

Scientific classification
- Kingdom: Plantae
- Clade: Tracheophytes
- Clade: Angiosperms
- Clade: Eudicots
- Clade: Rosids
- Order: Malpighiales
- Family: Hypericaceae
- Genus: Hypericum
- Section: H. sect. Myriandra
- Subsection: H. subsect. Centrosperma
- Species: H. swinkianum

Binomial name
- Hypericum swinkianum G.Wilh. & L.Rericha, 2016
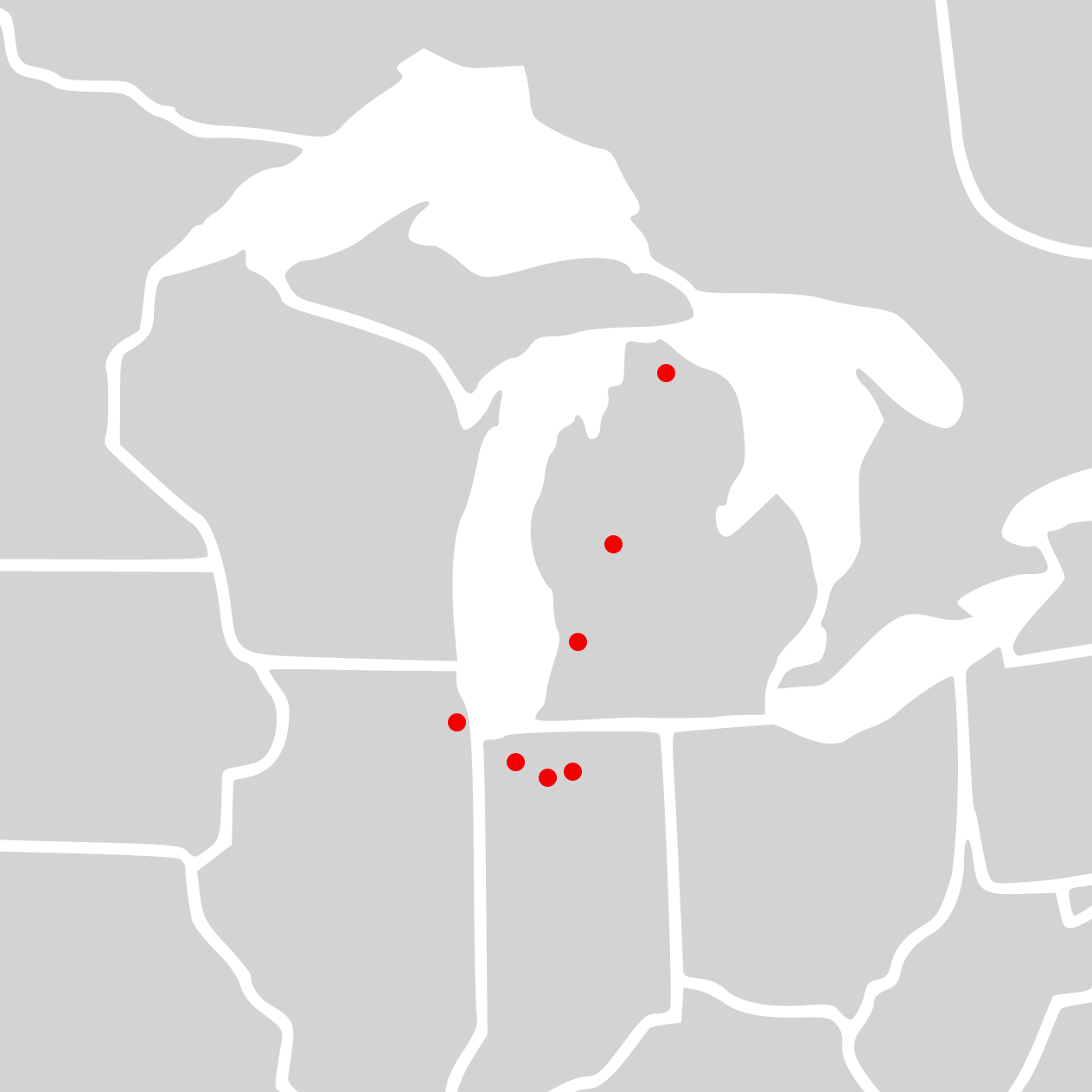
- Known occurrences of Hypericum swinkianum

= Hypericum swinkianum =

Species of plant

Hypericum swinkianum, known as Swink's St. John's wort, is a shrub in the St. John's wort family. It was named after Chicago Region botanist Floyd Swink (1921-2000).

== Description ==
Swink's St. John's wort is a many-branched shrub up to 1.8 meters (5.9 ft) high. It has exfoliating bark. The leathery, oblong leaves reach 2 centimeters (3/4 in) in width and 5 centimeters (2.0 in) in length, with weakly revolute edges. The flowers are produced in terminal flowerheads known as dichasia. Each dichasium produces 7-31 bright yellow flowers, each with 5 petals and numerous yellow stamens. The capsules are 5-parted. In the Chicago Region, it blooms between July and August.

Hypericum swinkianum differs from the closely related Hypericum kalmianum by its notably larger vegetative features, flowerheads each averaging more than 7 flowers, and an affinity toward acidic rather than calcareous habitats.

== Distribution and habitat ==
Swink's St. Johns wort is known to occur in sand flatwoods and acidic wet to wet-mesic sand prairies in the western Great Lakes region in the United States, including Illinois, Indiana, and Michigan. It is a highly conservative species with a coefficient of conservatism of 10 in the Chicago Region and in Michigan.
