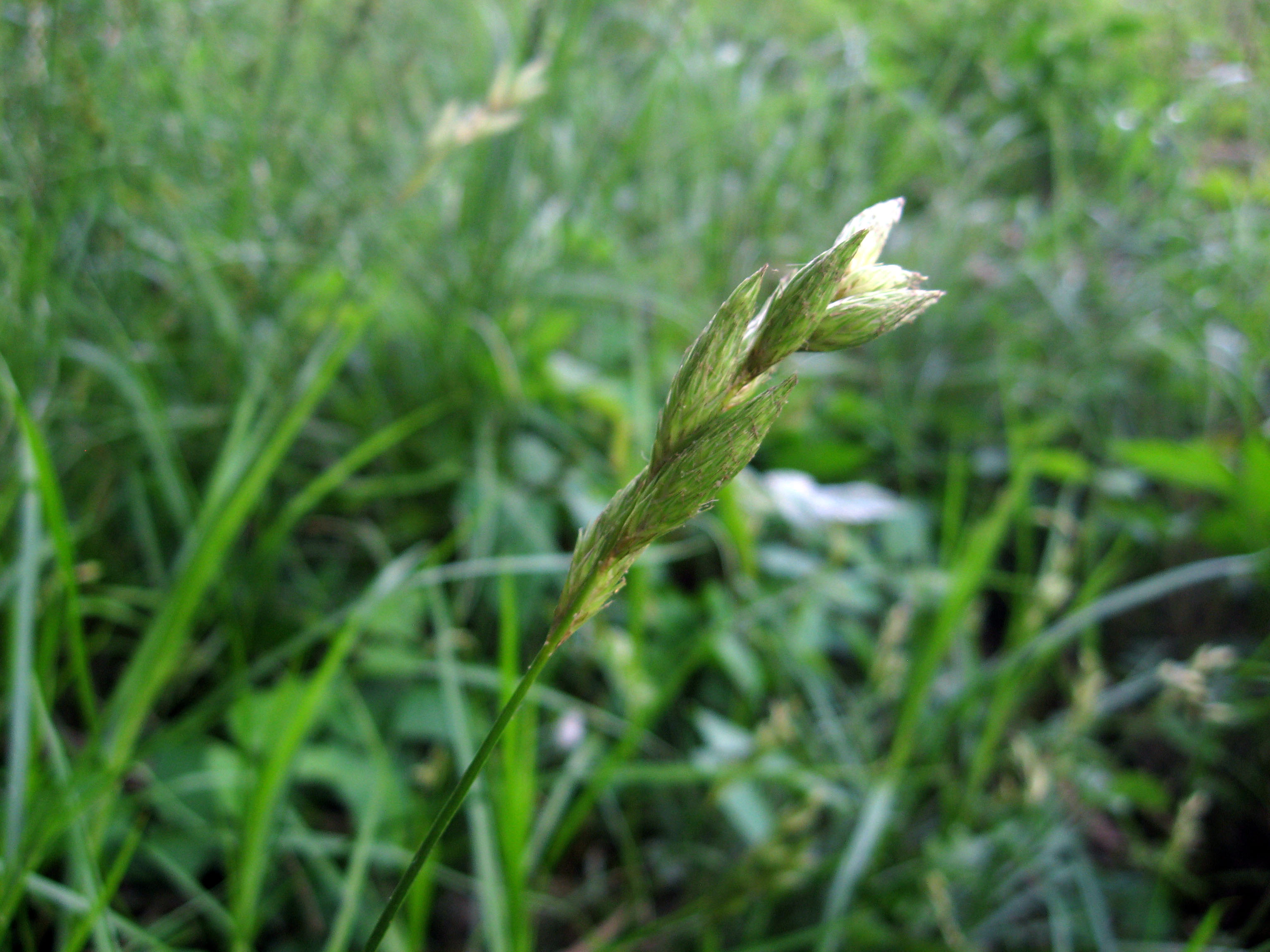

Conservation status
- Apparently Secure (NatureServe)

Scientific classification
- Kingdom: Plantae
- Clade: Tracheophytes
- Clade: Angiosperms
- Clade: Monocots
- Clade: Commelinids
- Order: Poales
- Family: Cyperaceae
- Genus: Carex
- Subgenus: Carex subg. Vignea
- Section: Carex sect. Ovales
- Species: C. muskingumensis

Binomial name
- Carex muskingumensis Schwein.

= Carex muskingumensis =

Species of grass-like plant

Carex muskingumensis is a species of sedge known by the common names Muskingum sedge and palm sedge. It is native primarily to the Midwestern United States where it is found in wet areas such as swamps, low woods, and sedge meadows. It is a fairly conservative species, usually being found in areas where native vegetation is intact.
