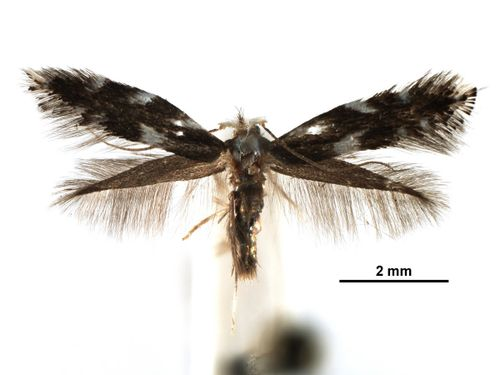

Scientific classification
- Kingdom: Animalia
- Phylum: Arthropoda
- Clade: Pancrustacea
- Class: Insecta
- Order: Lepidoptera
- Family: Bucculatricidae
- Genus: Bucculatrix
- Species: B. cuneigera

Binomial name
- Bucculatrix cuneigera Meyrick, 1919

Synonyms
- Bucculatrix errans Braun, 1920

= Bucculatrix cuneigera =

Species of moth

Bucculatrix cuneigera is a moth in the family Bucculatricidae. It is found in North America, where it has been recorded from Quebec, Ontario, New Brunswick, Nova Scotia, Maine, Ohio, New York, Massachusetts and North Carolina. It was described by Edward Meyrick in 1919.

The wingspan is 9–10.5 mm. Adults have been recorded on wing from May to July.

The larvae feed on Aster species, including Aster shortii. They mine the leaves of their host plant.
