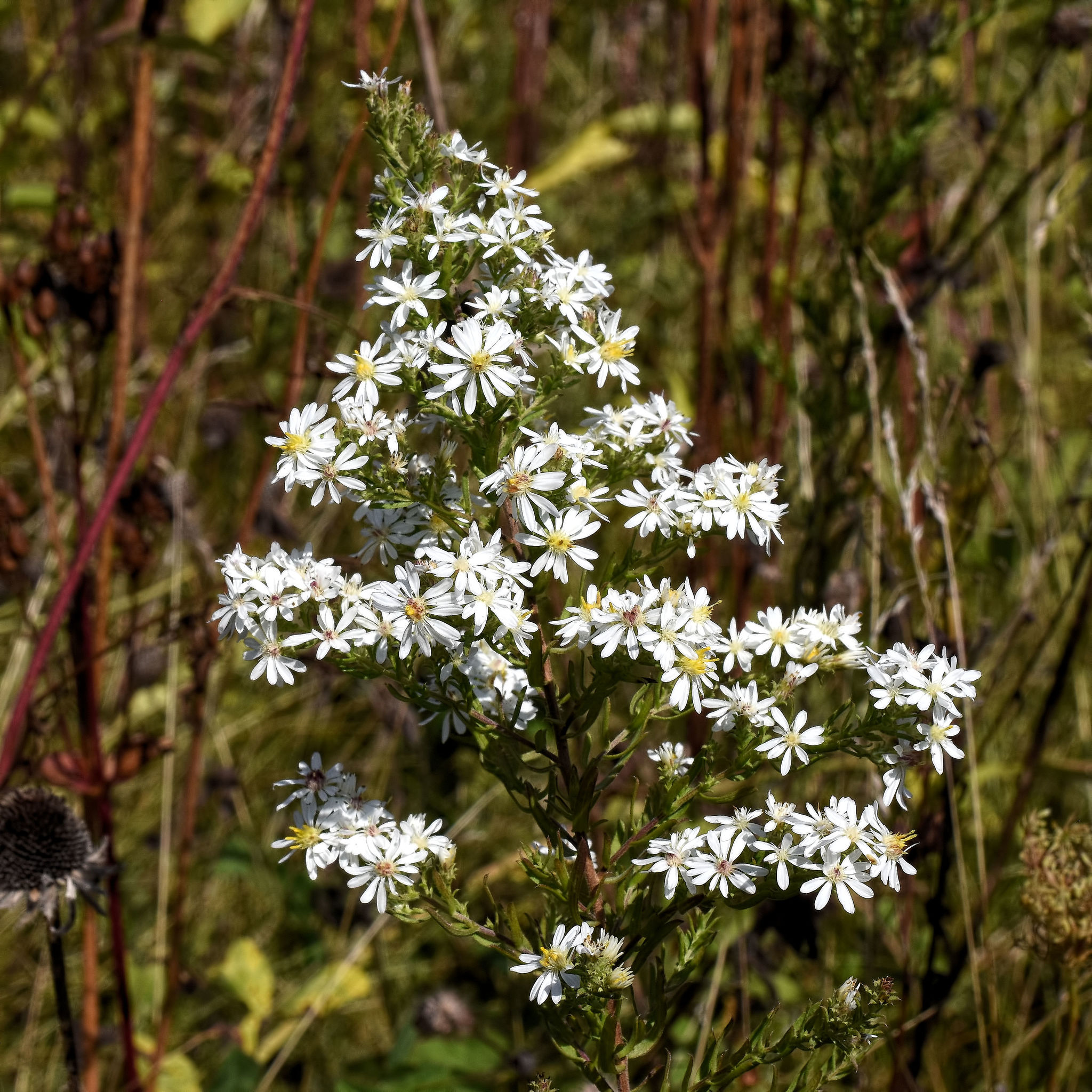
- Symphyotrichum ericoides in Green Lake County, Wisconsin

Conservation status
- Secure (NatureServe)

Scientific classification
- Kingdom: Plantae
- Clade: Tracheophytes
- Clade: Angiosperms
- Clade: Eudicots
- Clade: Asterids
- Order: Asterales
- Family: Asteraceae
- Genus: Symphyotrichum
- Subgenus: Symphyotrichum subg. Virgulus
- Species: S. ericoides

Binomial name
- Symphyotrichum ericoides (L.) G.L.Nesom

Varieties
- S. ericoides var. ericoides; S. ericoides var. pansum (S.F.Blake) G.L.Nesom
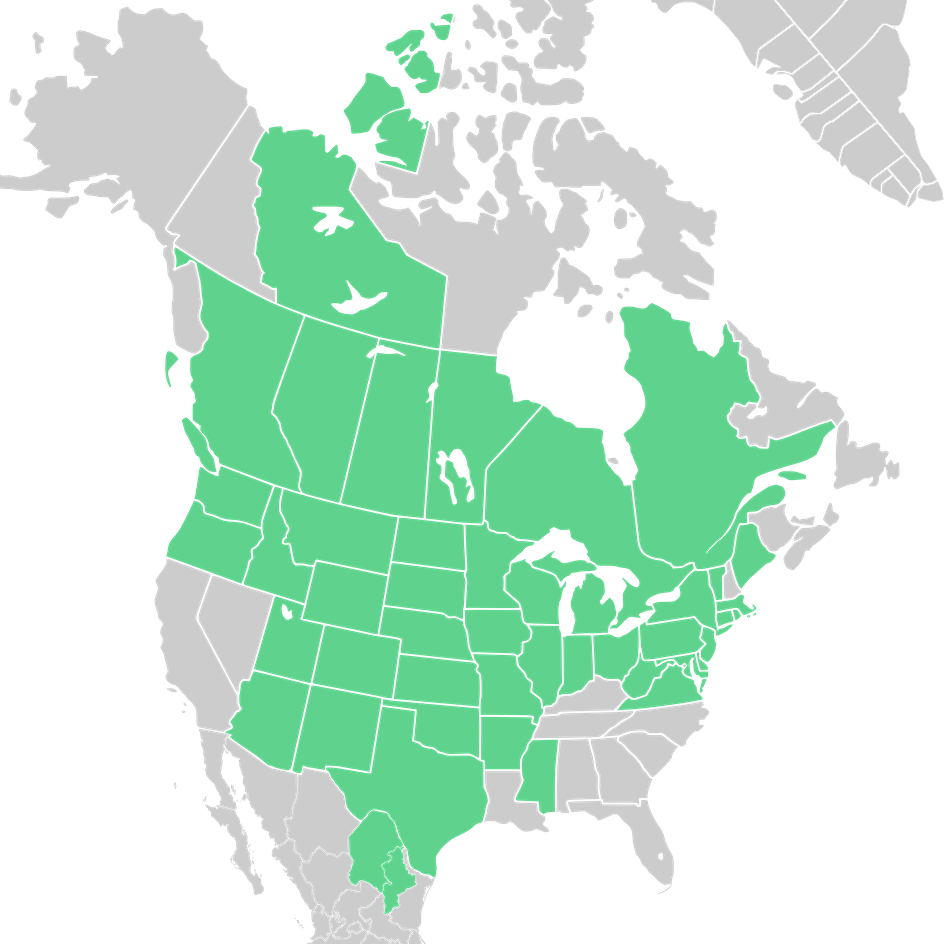
- Native distribution

Synonyms
- Basionym: Aster ericoides L.; Species: Aglotoma multiflora Raf.; Aster ciliatus Willd.; Aster commutatus var. polycephalus (Rydb.) S.F.Blake; Aster ericoides f. caeruleus S.F.Blake; Aster ericoides f. exiguus Fernald; Aster ericoides f. gramsii Benke; Aster ericoides f. polycephalus (Rydb.) F.C.Gates; Aster ericoides f. prostratus (Kuntze) Fernald; Aster ericoides var. prostratus S.F.Blake; Aster ericoides var. randii Britton; Aster ericoides var. reevesii A.Gray; Aster exiguus Rydb.; Aster glabellus Nees; Aster hebecladus DC.; Aster leptophyllus DC.; Aster multiflorus Aiton; Aster multiflorus var. caeruleus Benke; Aster multiflorus var. ciliatus (Willd.) W.P.C.Barton; Aster multiflorus var. exiguus Fernald; Aster multiflorus var. prostratus Kuntze; Aster pauciflorus M.Martens; Aster pilosus var. reevesii S.F.Blake; Aster polycephalus Rydb.; Aster × pseudodumosus (Thell.) Bergmans; Aster ramosissimus Mill.; Aster reevesii (A.Gray) G.Nicholson; Aster reversii Decne.; Aster scoparius DC.; Aster subulatus Steud.; Aster tenuifolius Willd.; Eucephalus ericoides Nutt.; Galatella leptophylla Nees; Lasallea ericoides (L.) Semple & Brouillet; Symphyotrichum ericoides f. gramsii (Benke) G.Wilh. & Rericha; Symphyotrichum ericoides var. prostratum (Kuntze) G.L.Nesom; Virgulus ericoides (L.) Reveal & Keener; var. pansum: Aster ericoides subsp. pansus (S.F.Blake) A.G.Jones; Aster ericoides var. pansus (S.F.Blake) B.Boivin; Aster ericoides var. stricticaulis (Torr. & A.Gray) F.C.Gates; Aster multiflorus var. pansus S.F.Blake; Aster multiflorus var. stricticaulis Torr. & A.Gray; Aster pansus (S.F.Blake) Cronquist; Aster stricticaulis Rydb.; Symphyotrichum ericoides subsp. pansum (S.F.Blake) Semple; Symphyotrichum ericoides var. stricticaule (Torr. & A.Gray) G.L.Nesom; Virgulus ericoides subsp. pansus (S.F.Blake) Á.Löve & D.Löve; Virgulus ericoides var. pansus (S.F.Blake) Reveal & Keener

= Symphyotrichum ericoides =

Species of flowering plant

Symphyotrichum ericoides (formerly Aster ericoides), with common names white heath aster, frost aster, and heath aster, is a species of flowering plant in the family Asteraceae native to much of central and eastern North America. It has been introduced to parts of Europe and western Asia.

The naturally occurring hybrid species of Symphyotrichum ericoides and Symphyotrichum novae-angliae (New England aster) is named Symphyotrichum × amethystinum and has the common name amethyst aster. It can grow where the two parents are in close proximity.

== Description ==
S. ericoides is a perennial herbaceous plant with stems from 30 to 91 centimeters (1 to 3 feet) tall. Its leaves are sessile (stalkless) and narrow, becoming smaller towards the top of the plant and tips of the branching stem. It has white (rarely pinkish), flower heads with yellow centers that begin blooming in late summer and last through fall. They are 8 to 10 millimeters (1/3 to 1/2 inch) across.

It is commonly confused with Symphyotrichum pilosum, which co-occurs throughout most of its range. S. pilosum has larger flower heads with longer ray petals. The phyllaries on S. pilosum are spine-tipped, while those of S. ericoides are not, although the curled edges may make them appear to be.

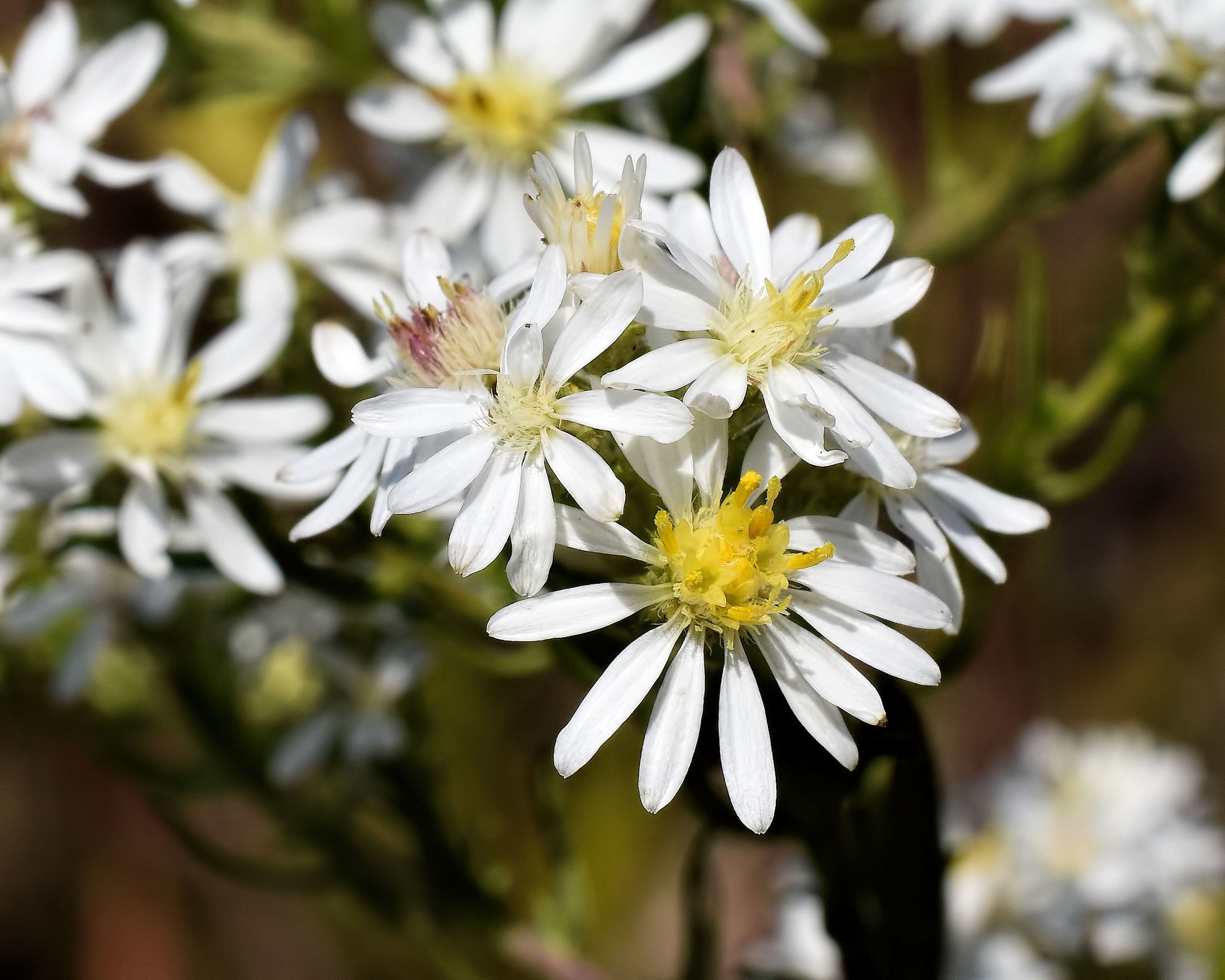
Close-up of the flowers

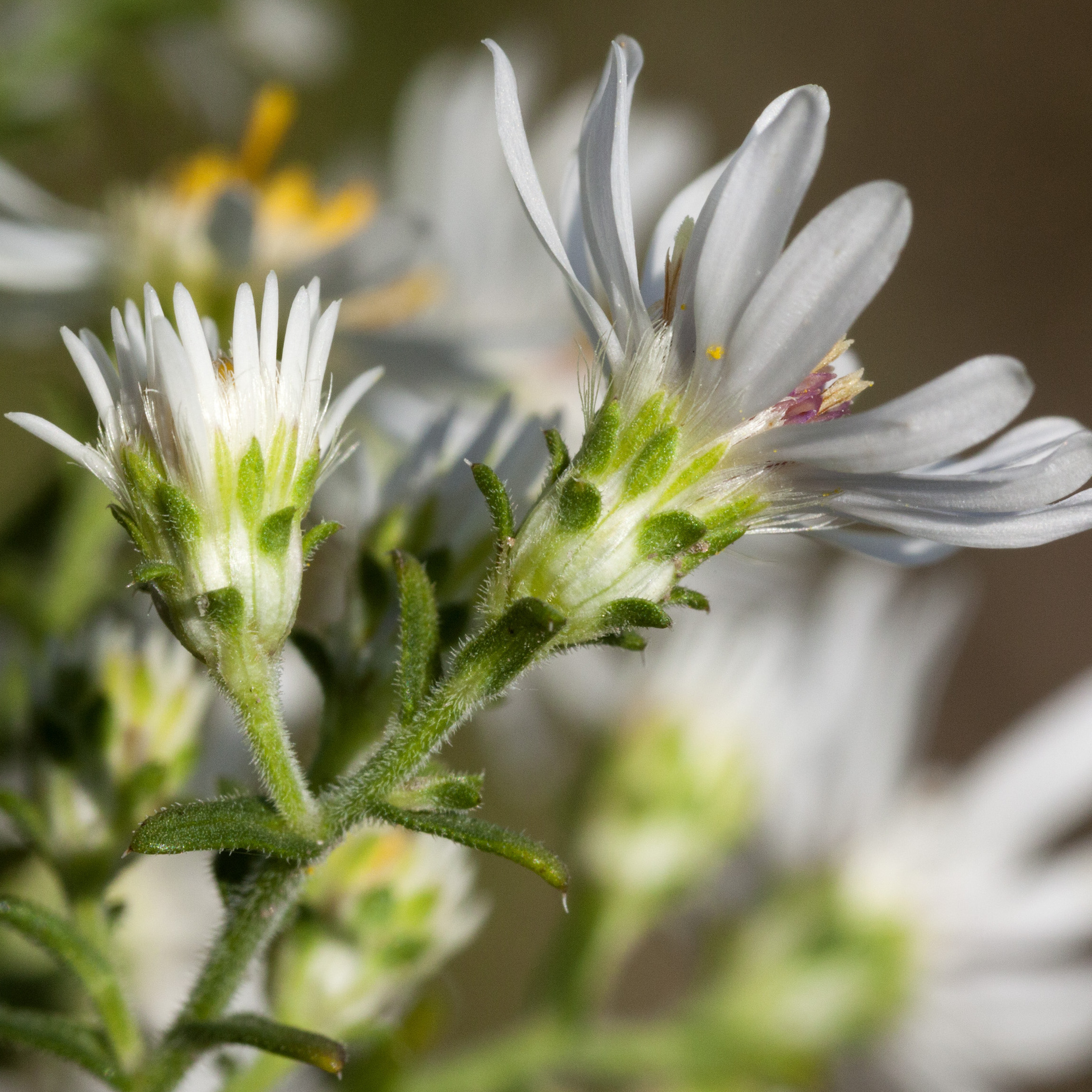
Involucres and phyllaries

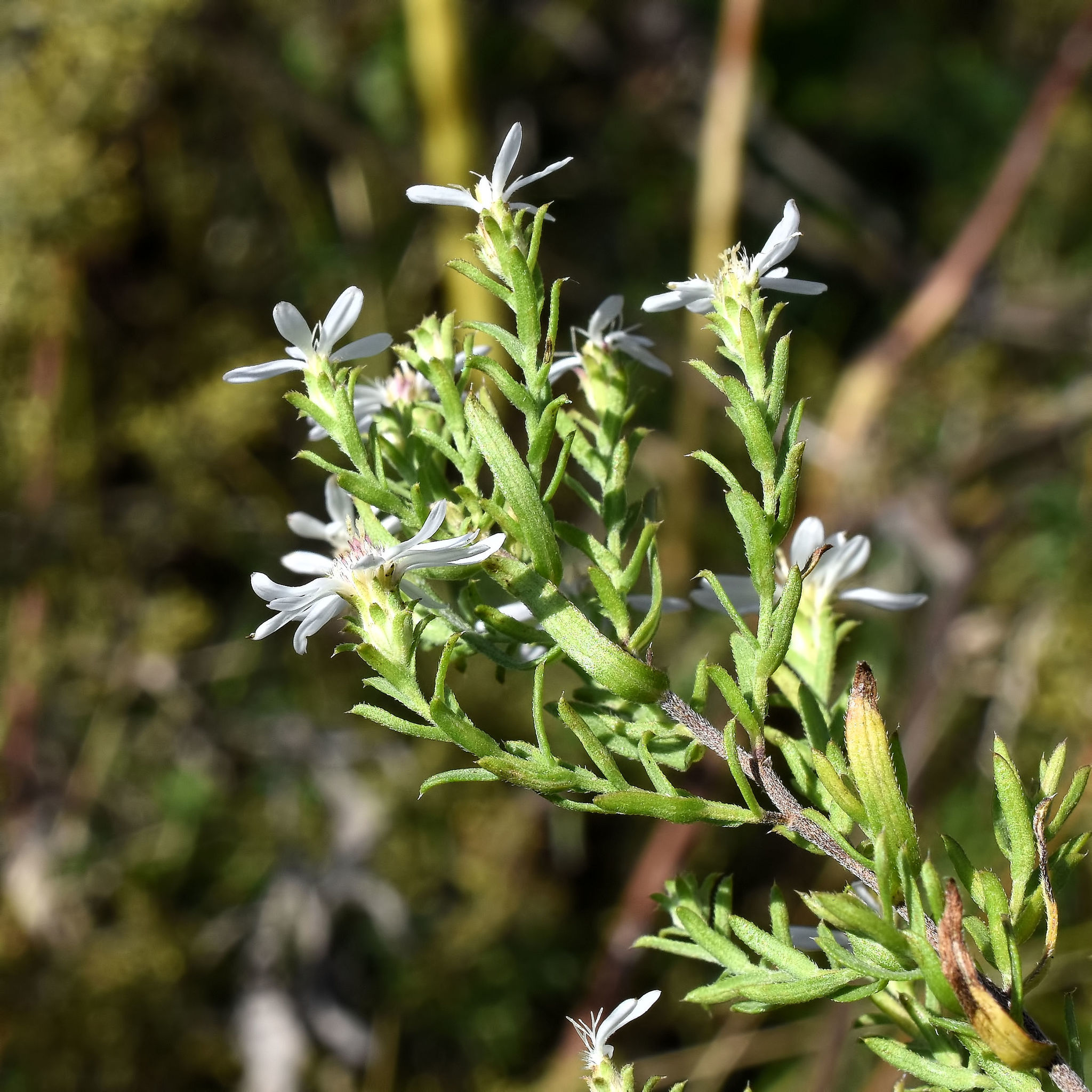
Bracts

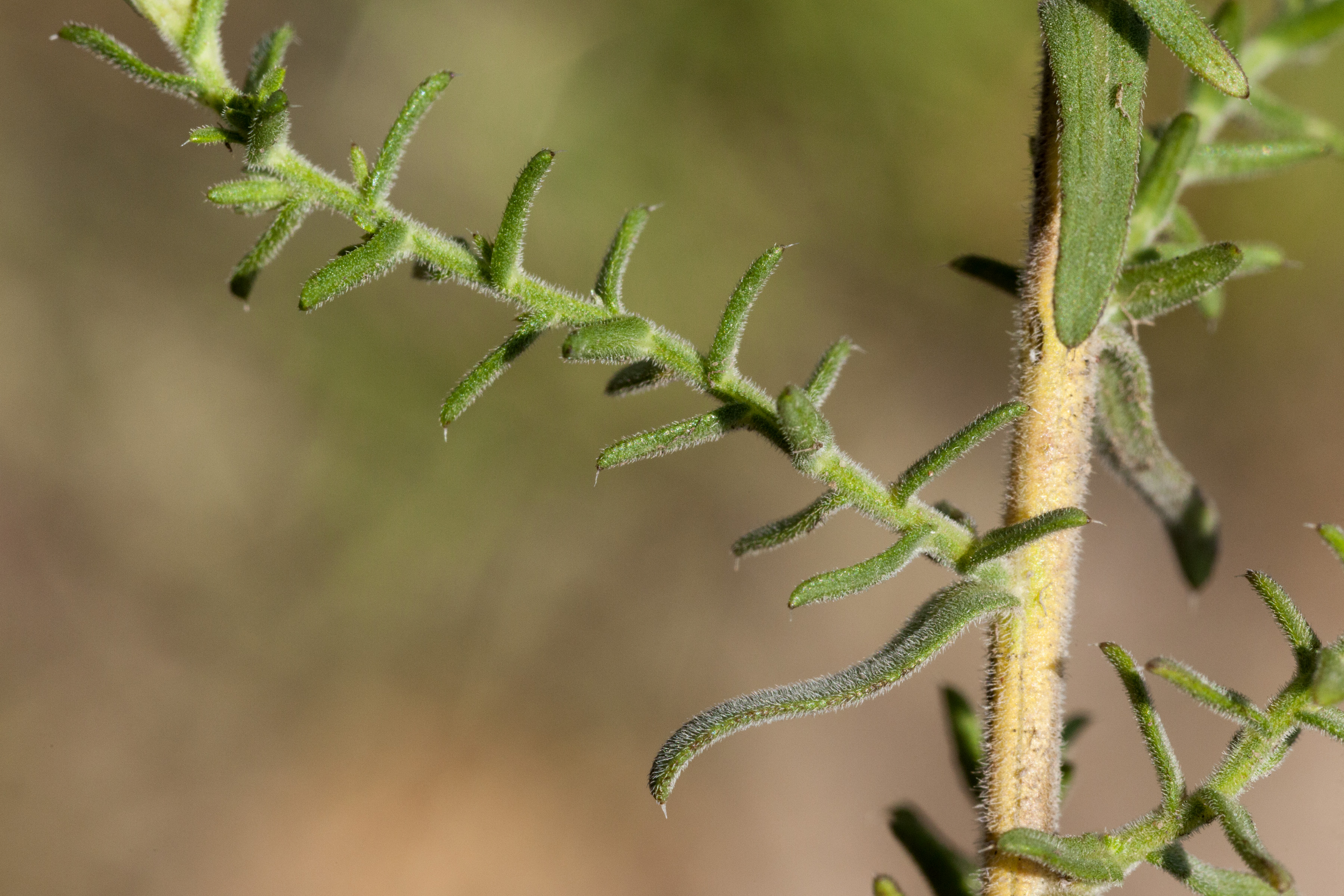
Leaves, stem, stem node, branch

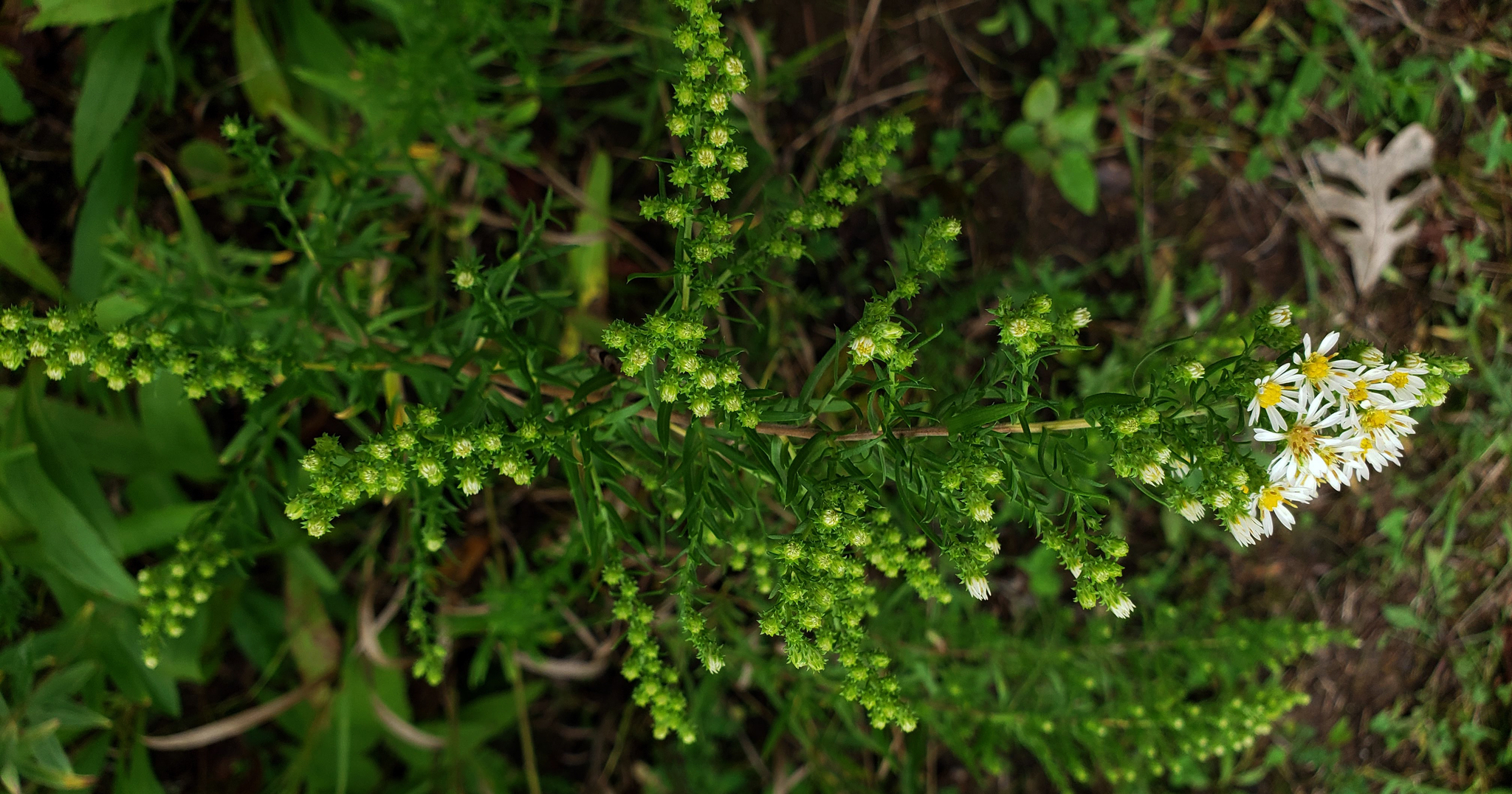
Just beginning to bloom

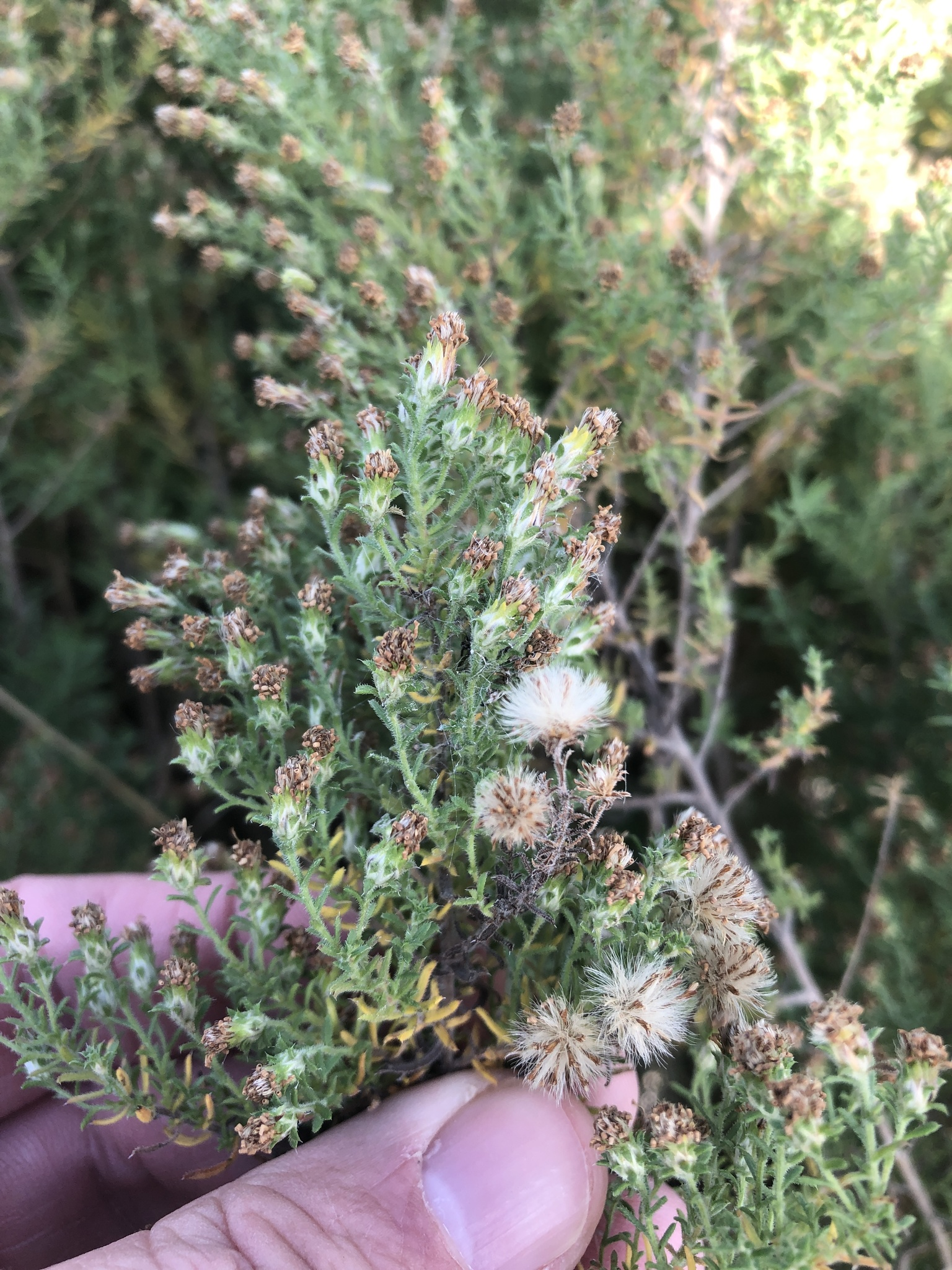
Fruiting

== Taxonomy ==
Symphyotrichum ericoides has two varieties: S. ericoides var. ericoides, which spreads by underground rhizomes to form colonies, and S. ericoides var. pansum (S.F.Blake) G.L.Nesom, which is cespitose, remaining in a clump, and has corm-like caudices.

F1 hybridization with Symphyotrichum novae-angliae can occur where the ranges of these two species overlap. The hybrid is called Symphyotrichum × amethystinum (amethyst aster) and is intermediate between the parent species in most respects.

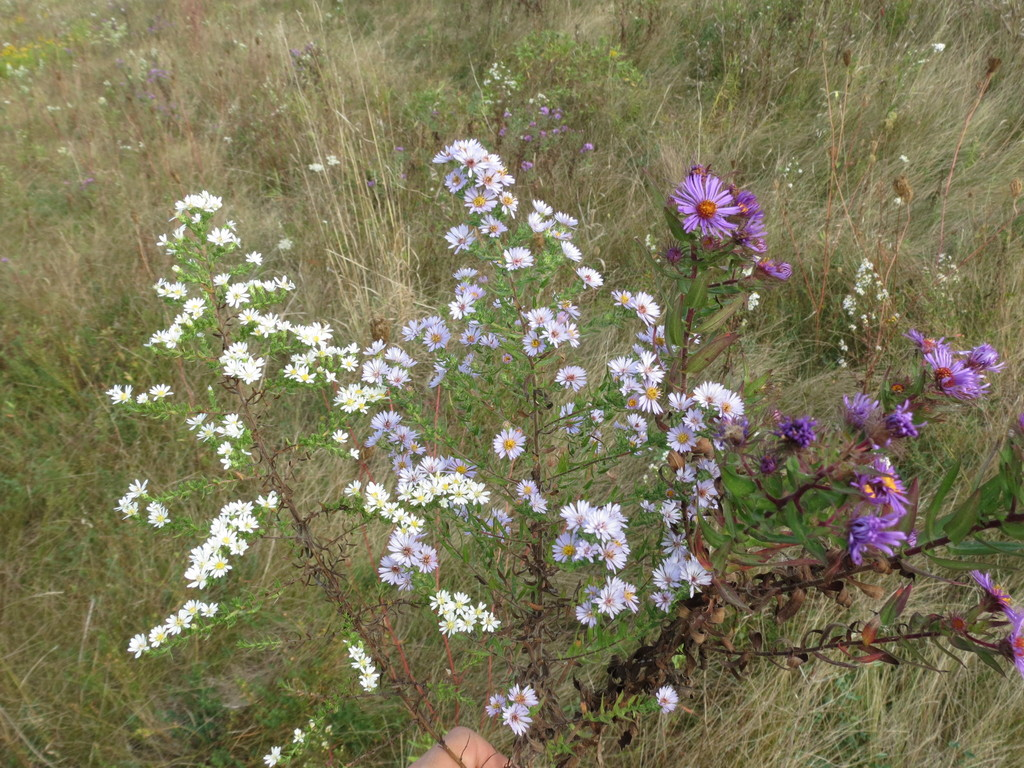
S. × amethystinum, center, is a hybrid between S. novae-angliae, right, and S. ericoides, left.

== Distribution and habitat ==
Symphyotrichum ericoides grows from Canada across much of the United States into the Mexican states of Coahuila and Nuevo León. The variety S. ericoides var. ericoides prefers open locations with sandy, gravelly, or disturbed soil.

== Conservation ==
As of October 2022, NatureServe listed S. ericoides as Secure (G5) globally, last reviewed on 16 May 2016. On a US state and Canadian province and territory basis, it listed the species as Vulnerable (S3) in New Jersey, Pennsylvania, and Virginia; Imperiled (S2) in Mississippi; Critically Imperiled (S1) in Georgia and Kentucky; Apparently Secure (S4) in Iowa, Manitoba, Maryland, and Northwest Territories; and, Secure (S5) in Alberta, British Columbia, Montana, New York, Ontario, and Saskatchewan. It is reported as an Exotic in Québec. The remaining states, territories, and provinces have not been ranked.

== Uses ==
=== Medicinal ===
Symphyotrichum ericoides has been used for medicinal purposes among Indigenous peoples of the Americas. It has been documented that the Meskwaki have used the plant both to revive an unconscious person and in a sweatbath as an herbal steam.

=== Gardening ===
Cultivars of Symphyotrichum ericoides are planted in gardens. Plants sold in the horticultural trade labeled as Aster ericoides, the old name of the plant, are usually cultivars or hybrids involving the species S. dumosum, S. lateriflorum, S. pilosum, or S. racemosum, a mistake that has occurred continuously since the 19th century.

The following are cultivars of S. ericoides that have gained the Royal Horticultural Society's Award of Garden Merit:

- 'Blue Star'
- 'Brimstone'
- 'Golden Spray'
- 'Pink Cloud'
- 'Ringdove'
- 'Snow Flurry' (of S. ericoides var. prostratum)
