= Blue aster =

Blue aster is a common name for several flowering plants in the aster family Asteraceae and may refer to:

- Symphyotrichum laeve, smooth blue aster
- Symphyotrichum oolentangiense (syn. Aster azureus), sky blue aster
