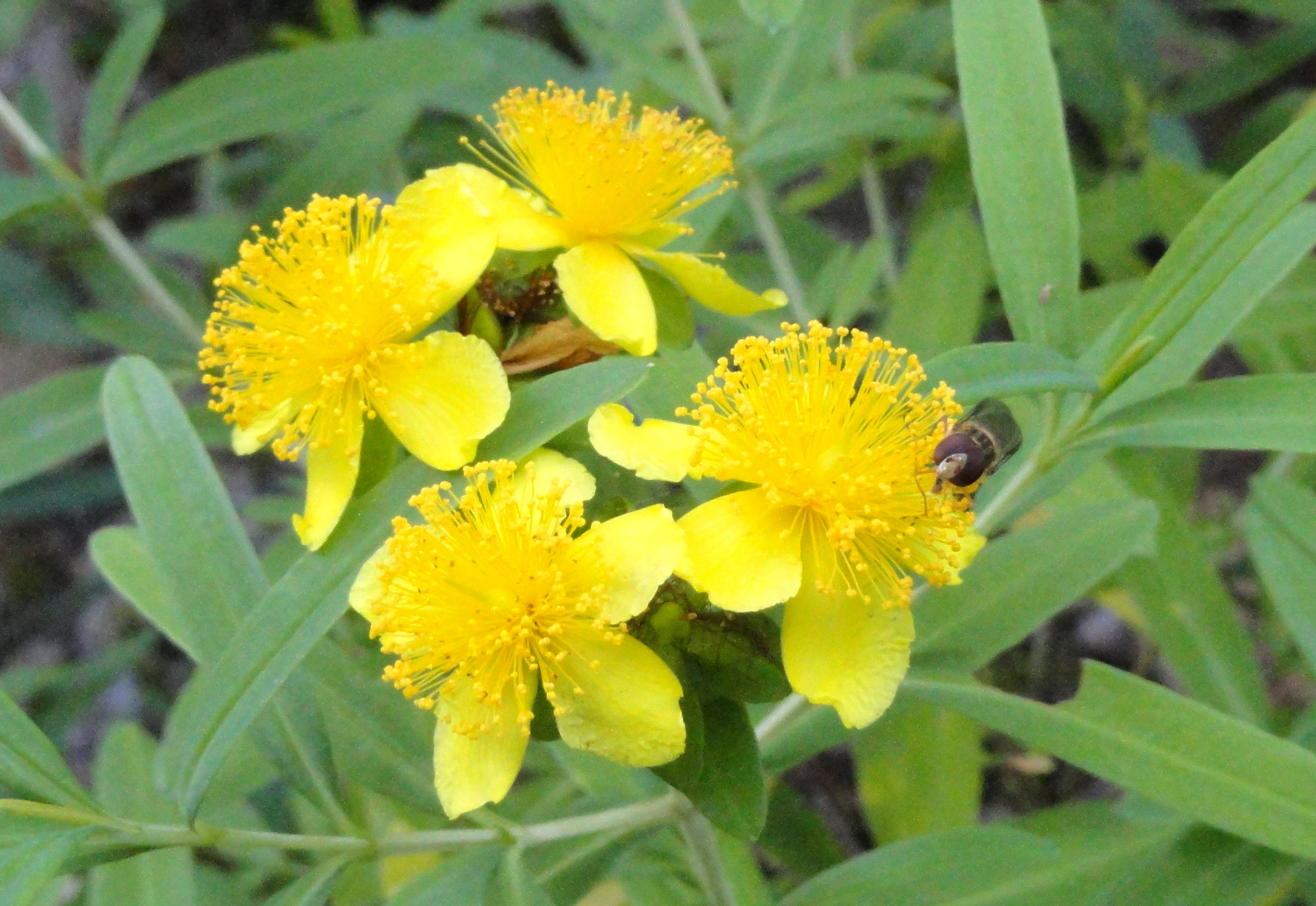
- In cultivation

Scientific classification
- Kingdom: Plantae
- Clade: Tracheophytes
- Clade: Angiosperms
- Clade: Eudicots
- Clade: Rosids
- Order: Malpighiales
- Family: Hypericaceae
- Genus: Hypericum
- Section: H. sect. Myriandra
- Subsection: H. subsect. Centrosperma
- Species: H. kalmianum

Binomial name
- Hypericum kalmianum L.

Synonyms
- Norysca kalmiana (L.) K. Koch

= Hypericum kalmianum =

Species of flowering plant in the St John's wort family

Hypericum kalmianum, commonly called Kalm's St. Johns wort or Kalm's St. Johnswort, is a flowering plant in the St. John's wort family Hypericaceae. It is native to the Great Lakes region in the northern United States and southern Canada. Hypericum kalmianum was named after its discoverer, Swedish botanist Pehr Kalm (1715–1779).

== Description ==
Hypericum kalmianum is a slender shrub that grows to a height of 20–60 cm (7.9–23.6 in). Its bark is whitish and papery. It has ascending four-edged branches that bear two-edged branchlets. The crowded bluish-green leaves are linear to oblanceolate and 3–4.5 cm (1.2–1.8 in) long. One to ten yellow flowers are borne on terminal and open corymbs, with each flower measuring 2–3.5 cm (0.8–1.4 in) wide. The leaf-like sepals are oblong and 5–15 mm (0.2–0.6 in) long. The ovoid capsules typically have five carpels and styles, though they can occasionally bear three, four, or six. The capsules are 7–10 mm (0.3–0.4 in) long and 4–7 mm (0.2–0.3 in) thick.

The plant flowers between June and August.

== Taxonomy ==
Formerly included within Hypericum kalmianum is another species first formally described in 2016, Hypericum swinkianum. Both species are part of the subsection Hypericum subsect. Centrosperma (H. sect. Myriandra). H. kalmianum can be differentiated from H. swinkianum by its narrower leaves, flowerheads averaging fewer than 7 flowers, and an affinity toward calcareous rather than acidic habitats. Additional species of Midwestern Hypericum closely related to these two may be yet to be described.

== Distribution and habitat ==
Kalm's St. Johnswort is primarily found around the Great Lakes in Ontario, Quebec, Illinois, Indiana, Michigan, New York, Ohio, and Wisconsin. In the Chicago Region, it is a highly conservative species that occur near Lake Michigan in calcareous sand prairies and marly pannés, and though rarely seen inland, can be found in prairie fens and mesic prairies. It is classified as an endangered species in Illinois and threatened in Ohio.

== Gallery ==
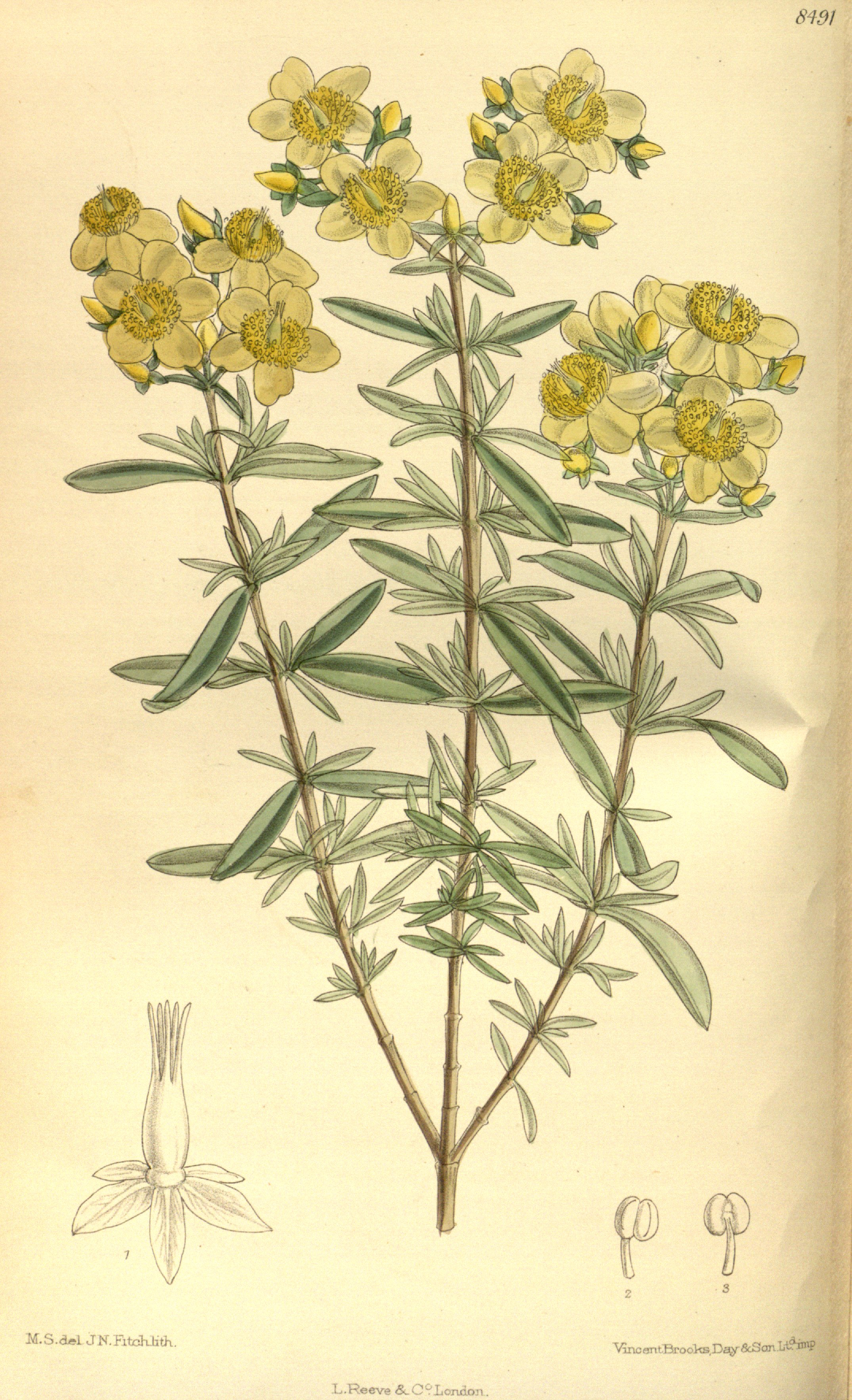
Botanical illustration, 1913

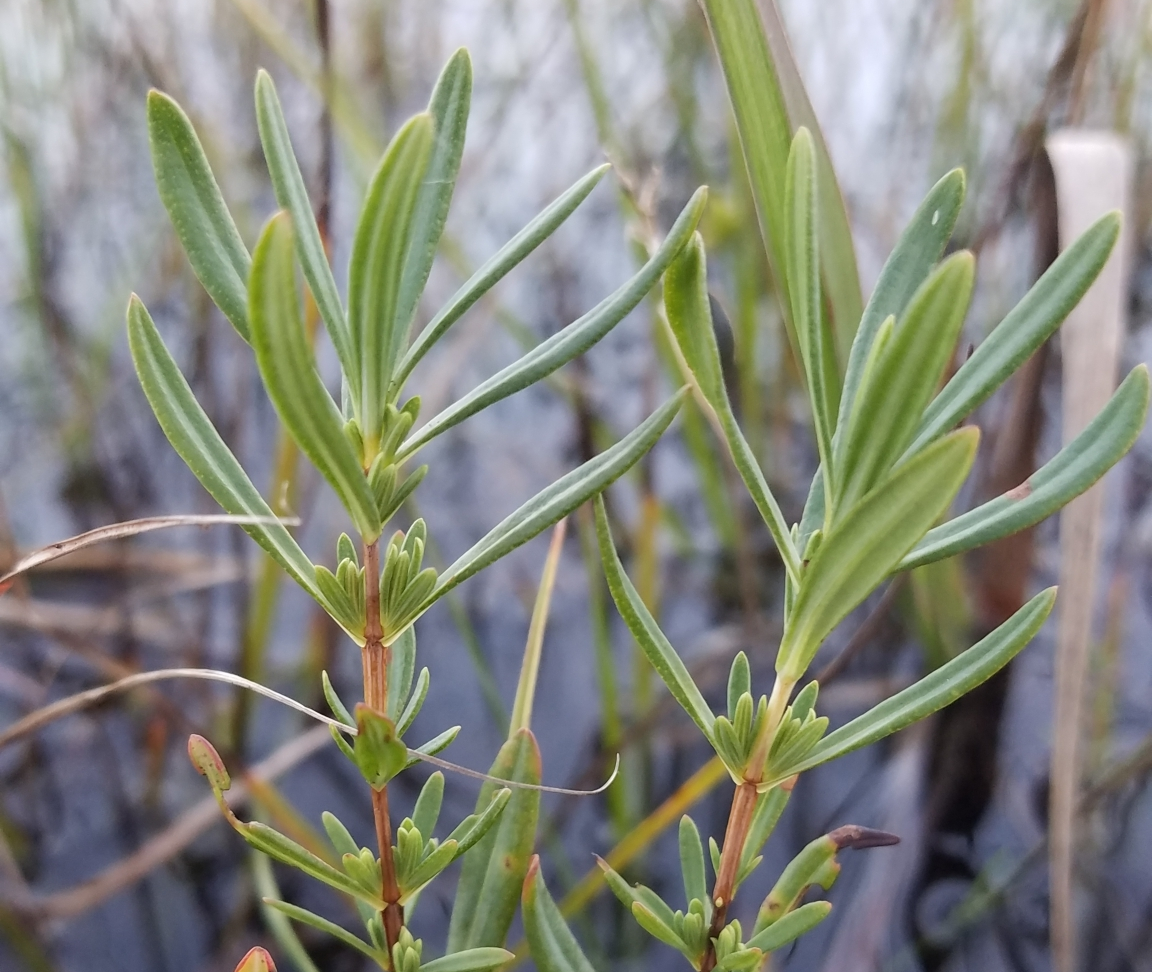
Leaves

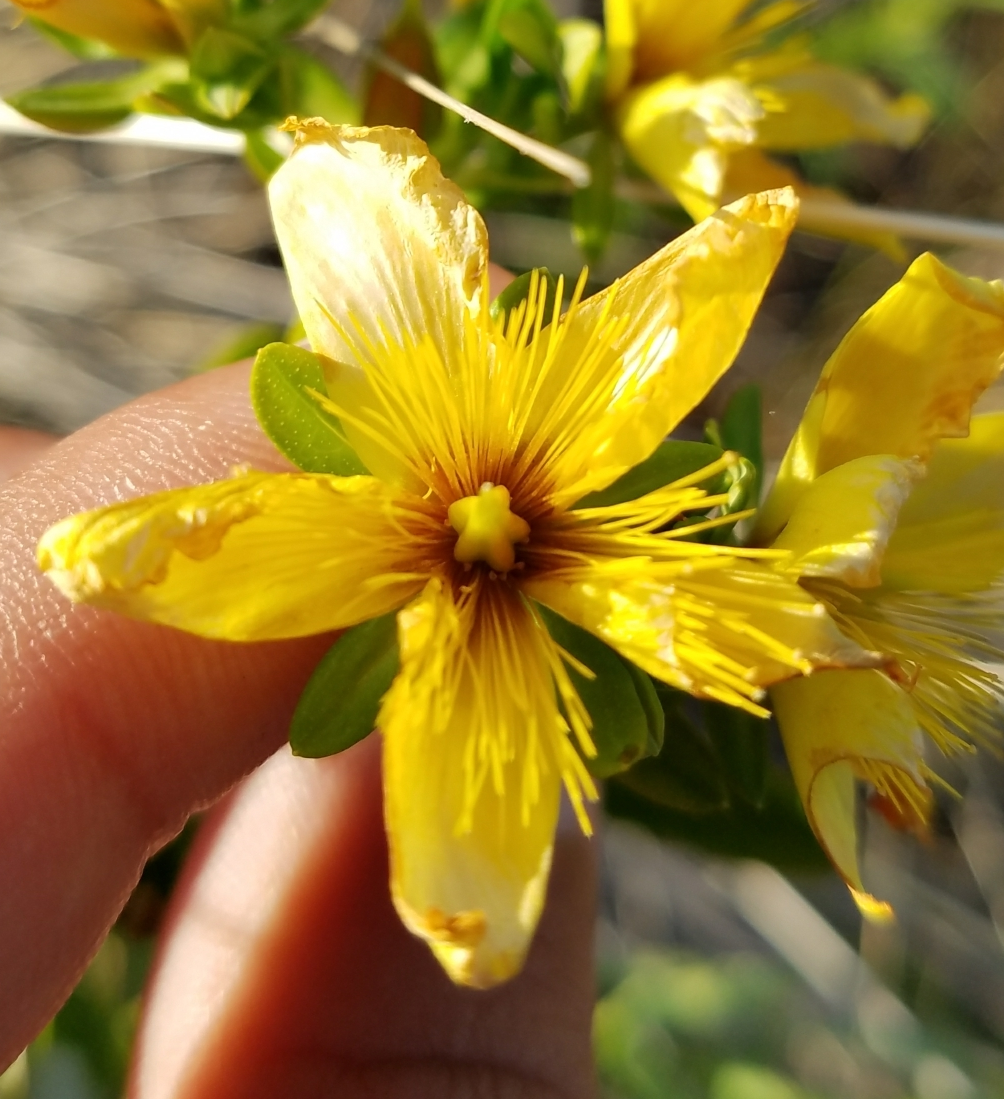
Flower

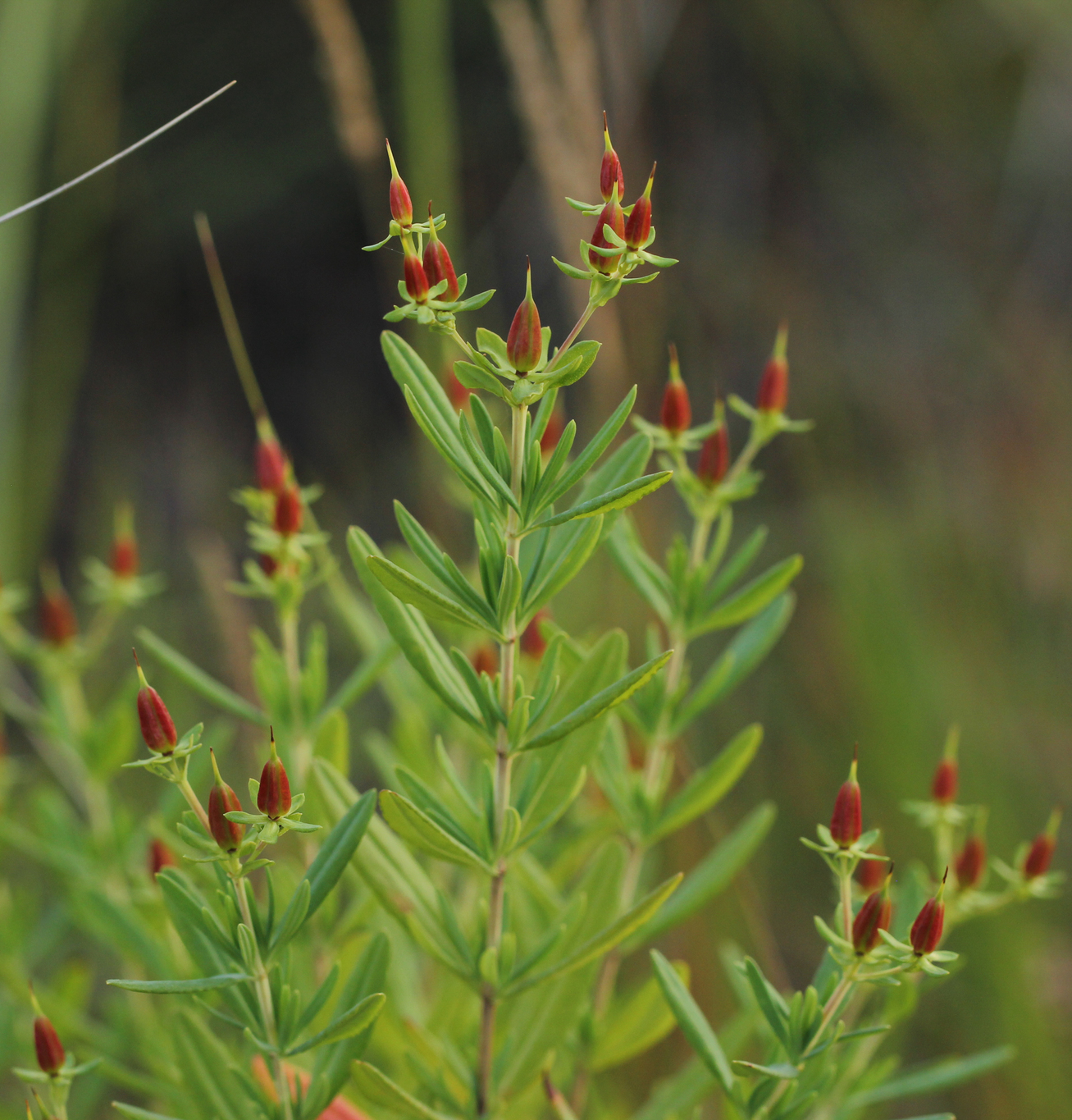
Fruits
