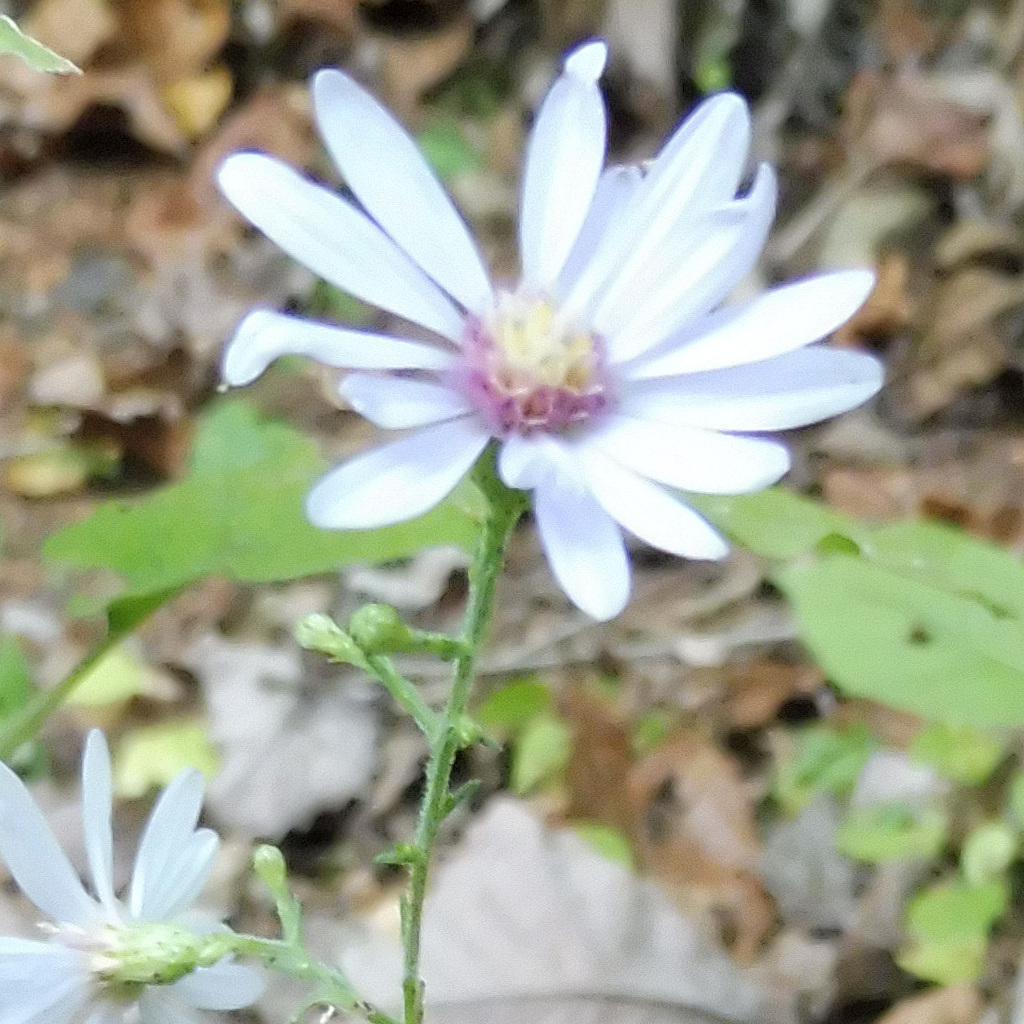

Conservation status
- Secure (NatureServe)

Scientific classification
- Kingdom: Plantae
- Clade: Tracheophytes
- Clade: Angiosperms
- Clade: Eudicots
- Clade: Asterids
- Order: Asterales
- Family: Asteraceae
- Tribe: Astereae
- Subtribe: Symphyotrichinae
- Genus: Symphyotrichum
- Subgenus: Symphyotrichum subg. Symphyotrichum
- Section: Symphyotrichum sect. Symphyotrichum
- Species: S. shortii

Binomial name
- Symphyotrichum shortii (Lindl.) G.L.Nesom
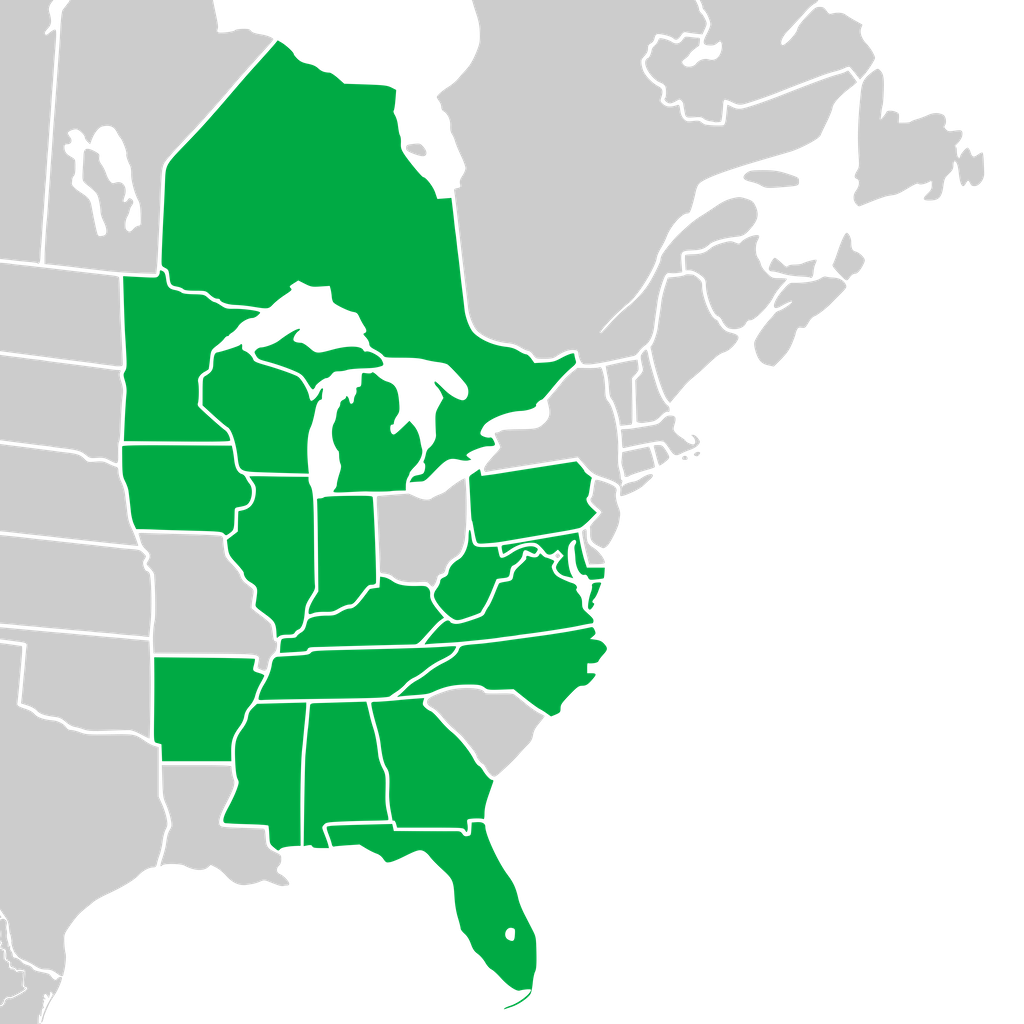
- Native distribution

Synonyms
- Basionym: Aster shortii Lindl. ex Hook.; Alphabetical list: Aster camptosorus Small; Aster shortii f. asper Shinners; Aster shortii subsp. azureus (Lindl. ex Hook.) Avers; Aster shortii var. camptosorus (Small) D.B.Ward; Aster shortii f. candidus Benke; Aster shortii f. gronemannii Benke; Aster shortii var. monroei Benke; Symphyotrichum shortii f. gronemannii (Benke) G.Wilh. & Rericha

= Symphyotrichum shortii =

Species of plant in the aster family

Symphyotrichum shortii (formerly Aster shortii), commonly called Short's aster, is a species of flowering plant in the family Asteraceae. It is native to North America, where it is primarily found in interior areas east of the Mississippi River. Its natural habitat is in thin rocky soils of woodlands and thickets often around limestone bluffs. It is common throughout much of its range, but it is usually restricted to intact natural communities.

== Description ==
Symphyotrichum shortii is a perennial herbaceous plant growing up to 110 centimeters (3.5 feet). It produces flower heads with purple ray florets in late summer and fall. Unlike many related Symphyotrichum species, its stem leaves are essentially entire and do not have a winged petiole. It bears a resemblance to the related Symphyotrichum oolentangiense of further west, from which S. shortii can be distinguished by its cordate stem leaves and pubescent phyllaries.

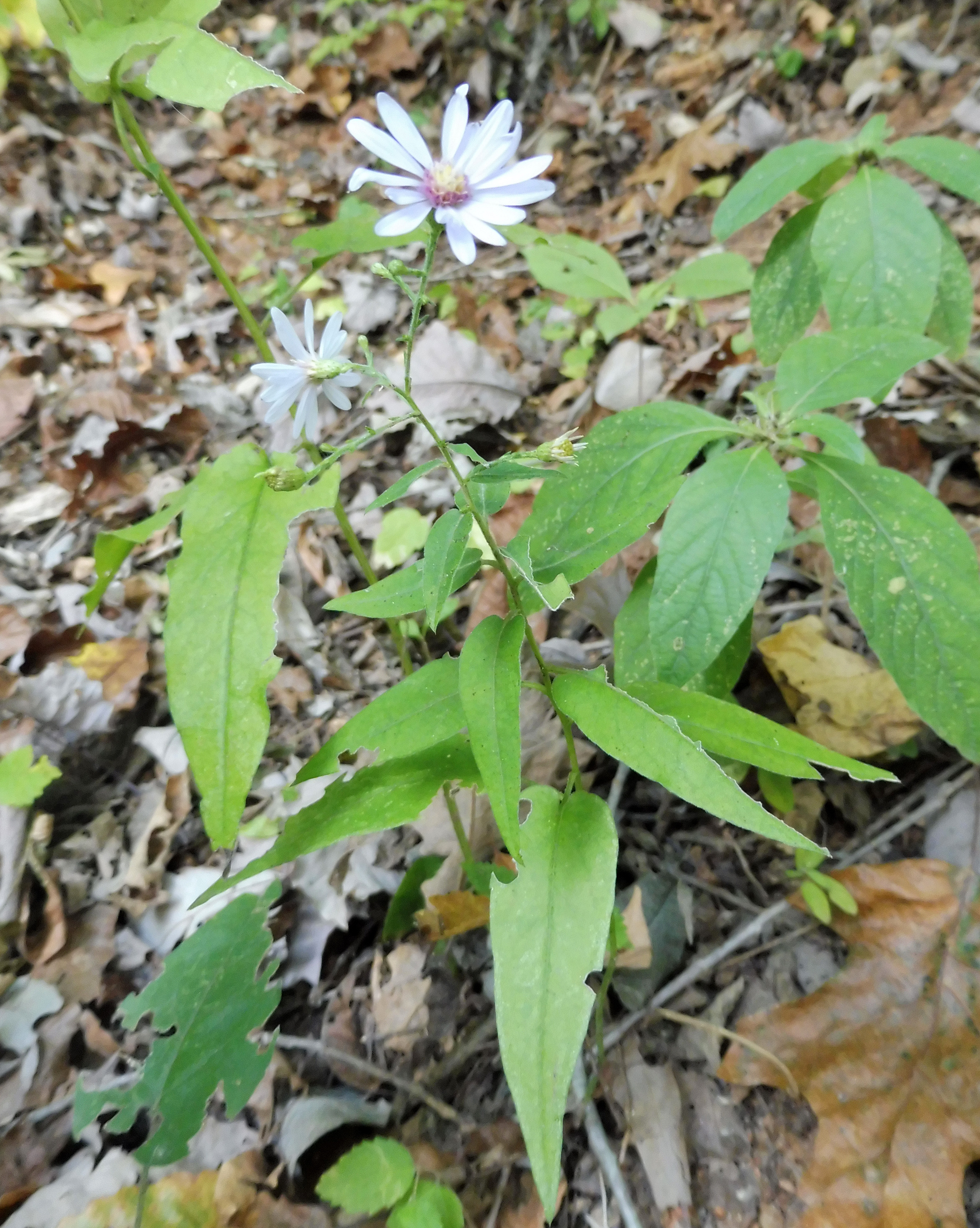

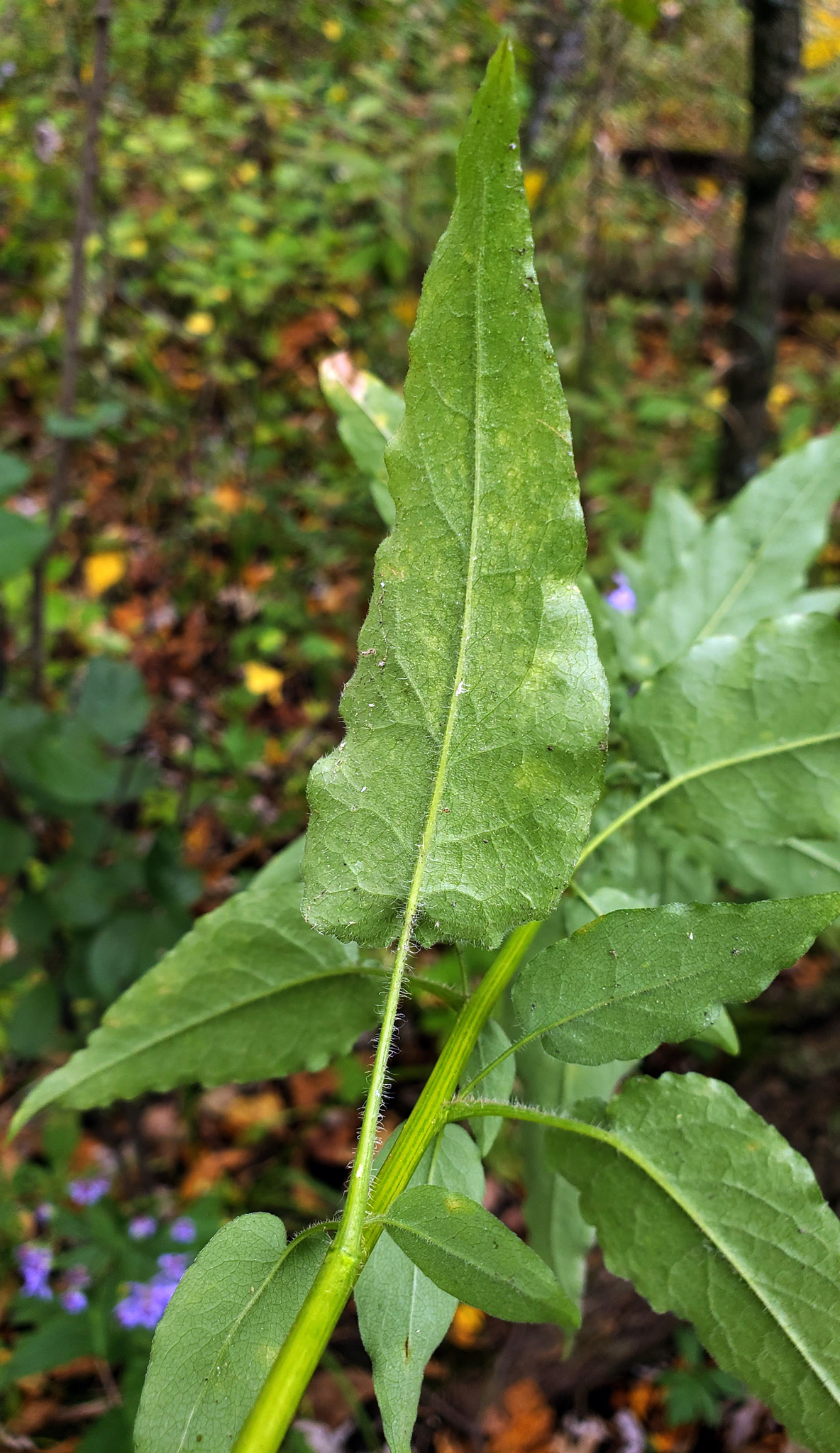

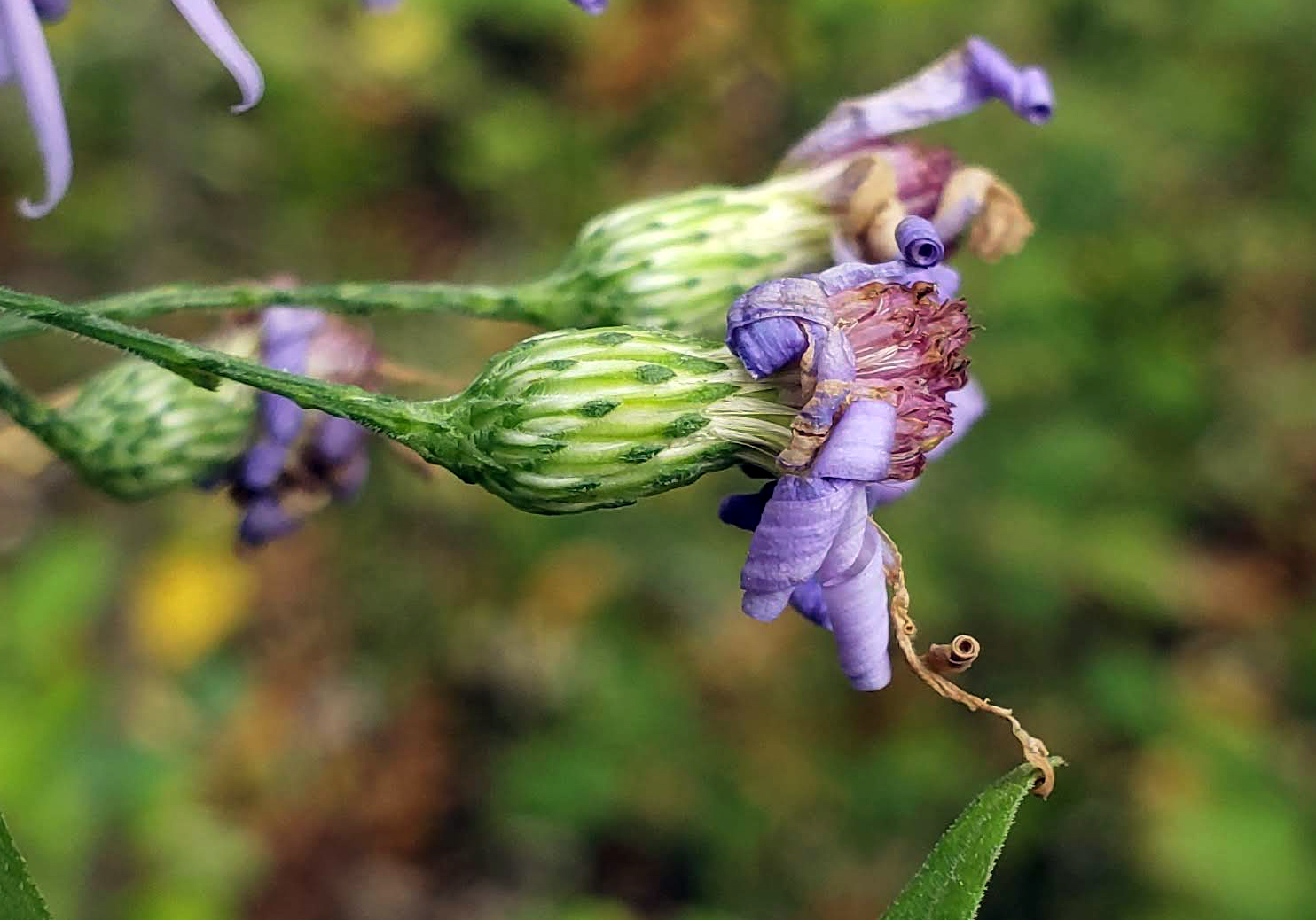

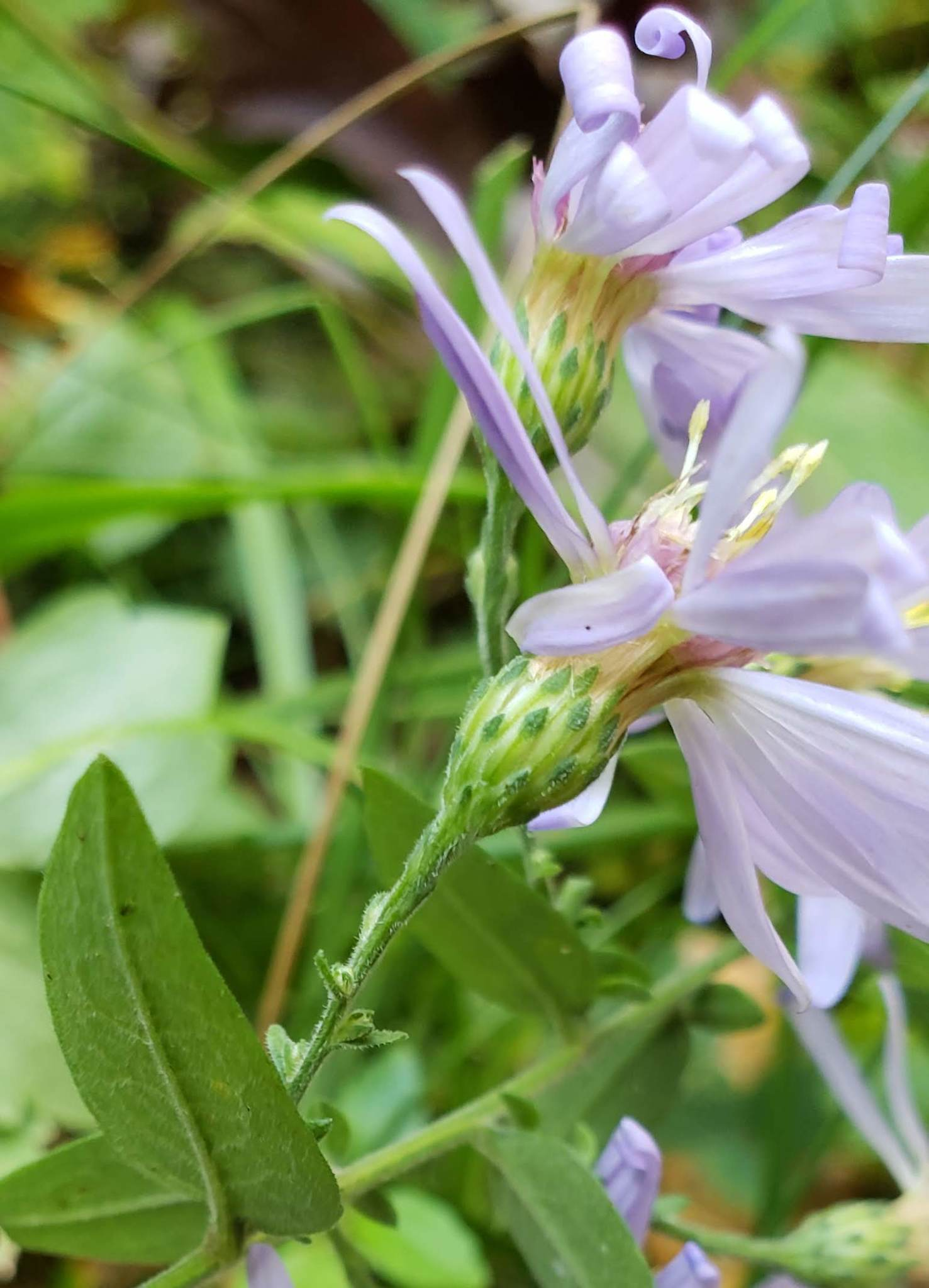

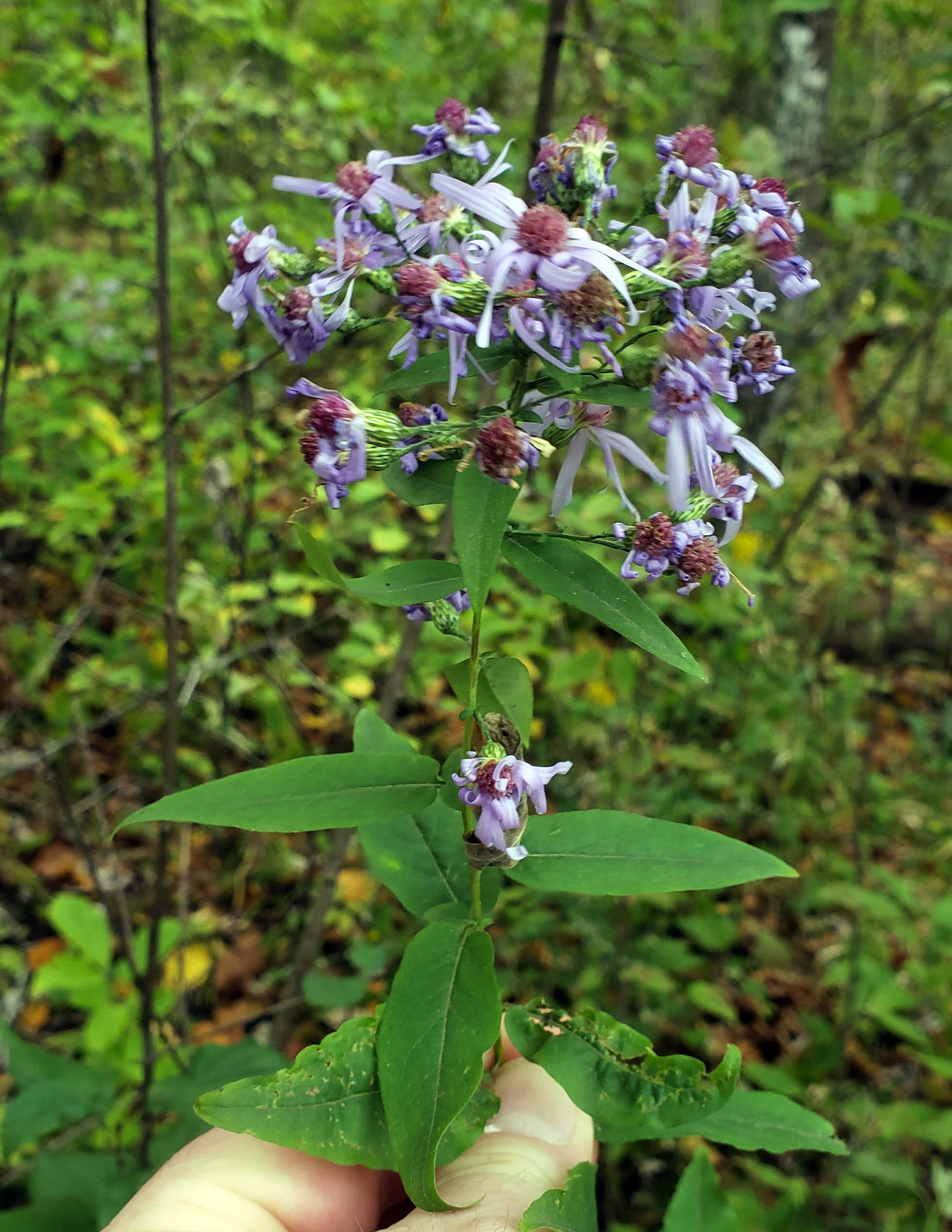

=== Chromosomes ===
S. shortii has a base number of eight chromosomes (x = 8). Diploid and tetraploid plants with respective chromosome counts of 16 and 32 have been reported.

== Taxonomy ==
The species was first formally described and named Aster shortii by English botanist John Lindley in 1834. A natural hybrid of S. cordifolium and S. shortii can occur, and this has been named Symphyotrichum × finkii.

== Distribution and habitat ==
Symphyotrichum shortii is native to North America, where it is primarily found in interior areas east of the Mississippi River. Its natural habitat is in thin rocky soils of woodlands and thickets often around limestone bluffs. It is common throughout much of its range, but it is usually restricted to intact natural communities.
