= Swink (surname) =

Swink is a surname. Notable people with the surname include:

- Floyd Swink (1921–2000), American botanist
- George W. Swink (1836–1910), American landowner and politician
- Jim Swink (1936–2014), American football player
- Kitty Swink (born 1954), American actress
- Robert Swink (1918–2000), American film editor
