= Coleophora granifera =

Scientific classification
- Kingdom: Animalia
- Phylum: Arthropoda
- Class: Insecta
- Order: Lepidoptera
- Family: Coleophoridae
- Genus: Coleophora
- Species: C. granifera

Binomial name
- Coleophora granifera Braun, 1919

Species of moth

Coleophora granifera is a moth of the family Coleophoridae. It is found in North America, including Ohio, Ontario and Quebec.

The larvae feed on the leaves of Aster shortii and Aster tradescanthi. They create a tubular, bivalved silken case.
