= Coleophora ericoides =

Scientific classification
- Kingdom: Animalia
- Phylum: Arthropoda
- Class: Insecta
- Order: Lepidoptera
- Family: Coleophoridae
- Genus: Coleophora
- Species: C. ericoides

Binomial name
- Coleophora ericoides Braun, 1919

Species of moth

Coleophora ericoides is a moth of the family Coleophoridae. It is found in North America, including Ohio and Nova Scotia.

The larvae feed on the seeds of Symphyotrichum ericoides. They create a trivalved, tubular silken case.
