= Reference ecosystem =

Species used as a model for restoration

A reference ecosystem, also known as an ecological reference, is a "community of organisms able to act as a model or benchmark for restoration." Reference ecosystems usually include remnant natural areas that have not been degraded by human activities such as agriculture, logging, development, fire suppression, or non-native species invasion. Reference ecosystems are ideally complete with natural flora, fauna, abiotic elements, ecological functions, processes, and successional states. Multiple reference ecosystems may be pieced together to form the model upon which an ecological restoration project may be based.
