= Sagawau Canyon =

Canyon in Illinois, United States

Coordinates: 41.6877°N 87.9260°W

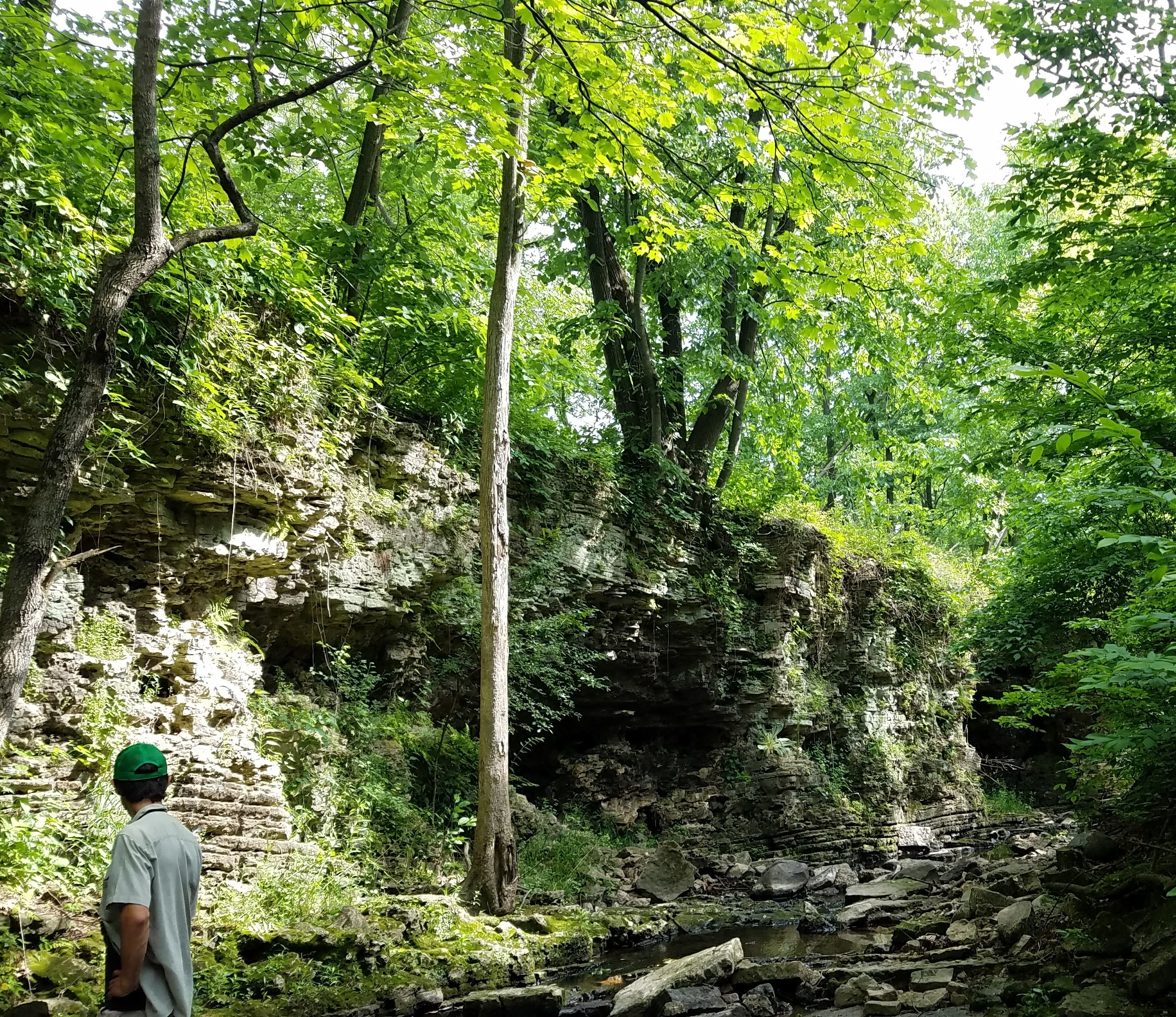
Sagawau Canyon in June

Sagawau Canyon is a canyon located at Sagawau Environmental Learning Center near Lemont, Illinois, in the Sag Valley. The site is owned by the Forest Preserves of Cook County and is the only such landform in the county. The canyon is known for its association with renowned Illinois botanist Floyd Swink, who did much to preserve the area during his career.

== Geography ==
A remnant of an ancient coral reef, the canyon "supports some of the most unusual and uncommon plants found in northeastern Illinois, including the bulblet fern, purple cliff brake, walking fern, hairy rock cress and ninebark".

Much of northeastern Illinois is covered with glacial till (see Geology of Illinois), so the exposed dolomite bedrock at Sagawau Canyon results in unique plants adapted to this habitat.

== Access ==
The site is an Illinois State Nature Preserve. In order to protect the unique plants, access to the canyon itself is limited to naturalist-guided tours only. These are offered spring through fall. Cross-country skiing access is available nearby in the winter.
