= Remnant natural area =

Flora and fauna that has not been significantly disturbed

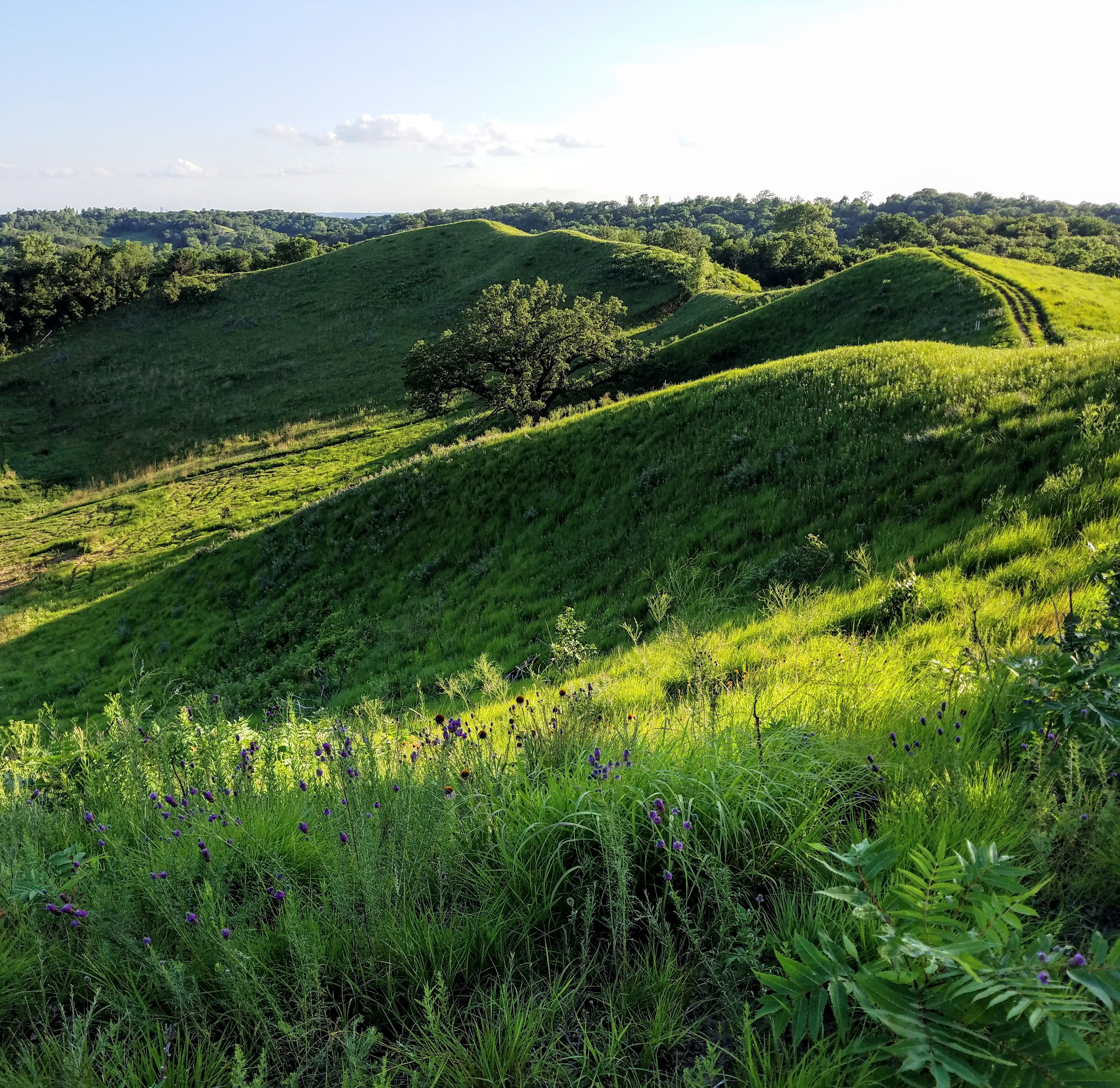
Remnant loess prairie habitat in western Iowa.

A remnant natural area, also known as remnant habitat, is an ecological community containing native flora and fauna that has not been significantly disturbed by destructive activities such as agriculture, logging, pollution, development, fire suppression, or non-native species invasion. The more disturbed an area has been, the less characteristic it becomes of remnant habitat. Remnant areas are also described as "biologically intact" or "ecologically intact."

Remnant natural areas are often used as reference ecosystems in ecological restoration projects.

== Ecology ==
A remnant natural area can be described in terms of its natural quality or biological integrity, which is the extent to which it has the internal biodiversity and abiotic elements to replicate itself over time. Another definition of biological integrity is "the capability of supporting and maintaining a balanced, integrated, adaptive community of organisms having a species composition, diversity, and functional organization comparable to that of the natural habitat of the region." Abiotic elements determining the quality of a natural area may include factors such as hydrologic connectivity or fire. In areas that have been dredged, drained, or dammed, the altered hydrology can destroy a remnant natural area. Similarly, too much or too little fire can degrade or destroy a remnant natural area.

Remnant natural areas are characterized by the presence of "conservative" plants and animals—organisms that are restricted to or highly characteristic of areas that have not been disturbed by humans. Tools to measure aspects of natural areas quality in remnant areas include Floristic Quality Assessment and the Macroinvertebrate Community Index.

== Examples ==
In the upper Midwestern United States, remnant natural areas date prior to European settlement, going back to the end of the Wisconsinian Glaciation approximately 15,000 years ago. Diverse remnant plant community examples in that region include tallgrass prairie, beech-maple forest, savannas, bogs, and fens. Remnant natural areas in Illinois have largely been classified by the Illinois Natural Areas Inventory as Category I "high quality terrestrial or wetland natural communities."

In Australia, remnant habitats are sometimes called "bushland," and include communities such as forest, woodland, grasslands, mallee, coastal heathland, and rainforest.
