= Floyd Swink =

American botanist (1921–2000)

- Born: May 18, 1921; Villa Park, Illinois
- Died: August 2, 2000 (aged 79); Wheaton, Illinois
- Spouse: Marie Swink
- Scientific career
- Fields: Botany
- Institutions: University of Illinois at Chicago, Forest Preserve District of Cook County, Morton Arboretum

Floyd Allen Swink (1921–2000) was an American botanist, teacher of natural history, and author of several floras of the Chicago region.

== Early life ==
Floyd Swink was born in Villa Park, Illinois in 1921. While attending York High School, he picked up an interest in local botany and explored natural areas in the Chicago region with his brother. As a young man, he worked as a professional and competitive speed typist, achieving speeds of 190 words per minute and demonstrating typewriters for L.C. Smith and Corona Typewriter Company in downtown Chicago. He was known for his showmanship and eidetic memory, with tricks such as keeping nickels perched on his knuckles, typing the capitals of the states in alphabetical order while he was reading a book upside down." Swink served as a typist in the U.S. Navy in a Chicago recruiting station between 1942 and 1945.

== Careers ==
=== Early botanical studies ===
Floyd Swink spent most of his career teaching plant and animal identification and creating works that allowed others to teach themselves with the help of a book. He studied plants largely on his own throughout his early 20s, but in 1946 he began to study under Julian Steyermark, a researcher and botanical curator at the Field Museum of Natural History. The two spent weekends collecting plants in Missouri, culminating in Steyermark publishing Flora of Missouri in 1963. In 1947, Swink struck up a correspondence with noted Indiana botanist Charles Deam, author of Flora of Indiana. He quickly won Deam's respect as a rising young botanist. They eventually met for a botanical outing with two other Indiana botanists. Deam wrote to Swink shortly after the trip saying, "no Prof. of the Chicago U. can equal you. Few can."

=== Poisonous plants ===
Between 1949 and 1955, Swink was a professor of botany, zoology, pharmacognosy, and entomology as well as a part-time student at the College of Pharmacy of the University of Illinois at Chicago. He was nationally recognized as an authority on poisonous plants, serving as an expert consultant to hospitals around the country in cases of poisoning and potentially poisonous plant identification.

=== Plants of the Chicago Region ===
Swink published his first book in 1953: A guide to the wild flowering plants of the Chicago region. Between 1957 and 1960, he was employed as a naturalist with the Forest Preserve District of Cook County. In 1960, he joined The Morton Arboretum in Lisle, Illinois as the director of education, teaching botany and natural history. He became the arboretum's plant taxonomist in 1963. He continued to work for the Morton Arboretum for almost 40 years.

Few and out-of-date botanical resources were available to Chicago area botanists in the 1960s. At the request of Northern Illinois University's Dr. Herbert Lamp, in 1965 Swink typed up a list of plants from M. L. Fernald's 8th edition of Gray's Manual that included only those species found in the Chicago area. It became known by naturalists as the "Lamp List." After several years fervently collecting plant specimens and county records throughout the region, Swink published Plants of the Chicago Region in 1969. Only 250 copies were printed and it quickly sold out. This regional flora compiled wild plant occurrences from counties in northeastern Illinois, southeastern Wisconsin, northern Indiana, and southwestern Michigan—an area delimited by what was considered a reasonable a day trip from Chicago.

In contrast with other floras which were sometimes deemed "too recondite for the weekend botanist," the plants were sorted alphabetically by genus rather than in phylogenetic order and author citations were excluded, to the disapproval of some other contemporary botanists. Plants of the Chicago Region was also distinctive in providing lists of "associated" plant species for each entry, and with later editions rendering non-native species in italics while leaving native species non-italicized. These unique features of the flora reflected the nascent community of ecological restoration practitioners that grew out of the Chicago region in the mid-20th century. The lists of associate species have been widely referenced by regional restoration projects, including Stephen Packard's efforts to restore savannas along the North Branch of the Chicago River.

Swink continued work on this regional flora for several decades. The second edition was published in 1974. The third edition, co-authored with Gerould Wilhelm, was published in 1979, and the fourth and final edition was published in 1994. The third edition of Plants of the Chicago Region was the first regional flora to include coefficients of conservatism for each plant species, following the Floristic Quality Assessment system originally conceived by Wilhelm in 1977 for Kane County, Illinois.

=== Accolades ===
Swink was awarded an honorary doctorate in 1995 by Western Illinois University for the vast botanical and ornithological knowledge he had acquired by individual study, as well as his generosity in sharing that knowledge with others.

Swink, Robert Betz, and Ray Schulenberg—the "Prairie Triad"—were awarded the George B. Fell Award in 1996 for their work in the pioneering of prairie restoration in northern Illinois.

== Legacy ==
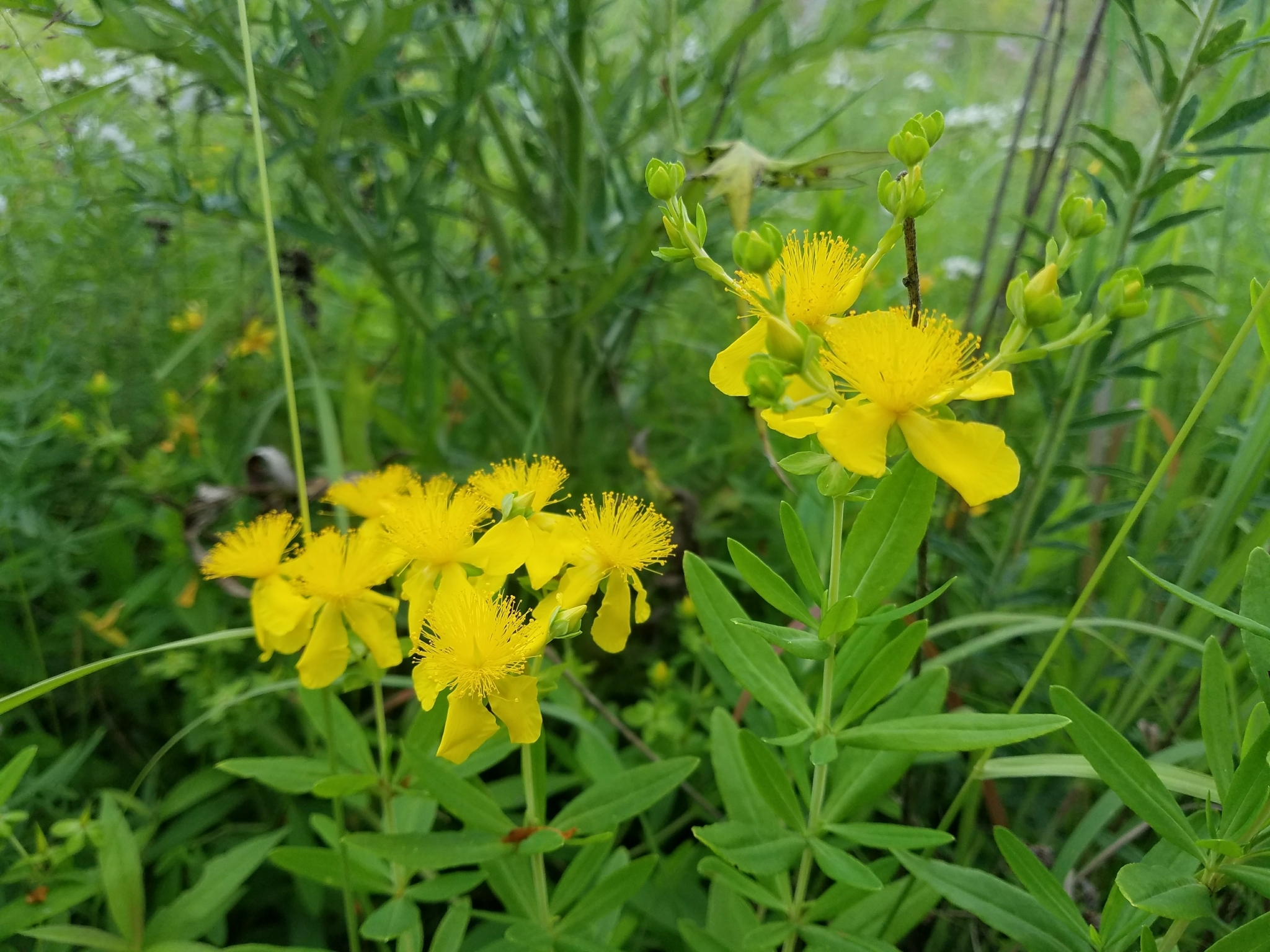
Hypericum swinkianum

Floyd Swink is known for his lasting contributions to botany through his several published works on the flora of the Chicago region. He was instrumental in securing the protection of numerous natural areas. He worked with Robert Betz to preserve Santa Fe Prairie in Hodgkins, Illinois, Sagawau Canyon, a unique natural feature near Lemont, IL, and also advocated for the restoration of the Indiana Dunes.

Swink's legacy of botanical study in the Chicago Region continues in those that he mentored, including the publishing of Flora of the Chicago Region: A Floristic and Ecological Synthesis by Gerould Wilhelm and Laura Rericha in 2017.

In 2016, Wilhelm and Rericha named the plant Hypericum swinkianum (Swink's St. Johns wort) in his honor.

== Publications ==
- Swink, Floyd (1953). A guide to the wild flowering plants of the Chicago region. Chicago, IL: Rockrose Press, Inc.
- Swink, Floyd (1964). Birds of the Morton Arboretum. Lisle, IL: The Morton Arboretum.
- Swink, Floyd (1969). Plants of the Chicago Region. Lisle, IL: The Morton Arboretum.
- Swink, Floyd (1974). Plants of the Chicago Region, 2nd edition. Lisle, IL: The Morton Arboretum.
- Swink, Floyd; Wilhelm, Gerould (1979). Plants of the Chicago Region, 3rd edition. Lisle, IL: The Morton Arboretum.
- Swink, Floyd (1990). The Key: Key to the Flora of the Northeast United States and Southeast Canada. Flossmoor, IL: John J. Sabuco & Plantsmen's Publications.
- Swink, Floyd; Wilhelm, Gerould (1994). Plants of the Chicago Region, 4th edition. Indianapolis, IN: Indiana Academy of Sciences.
