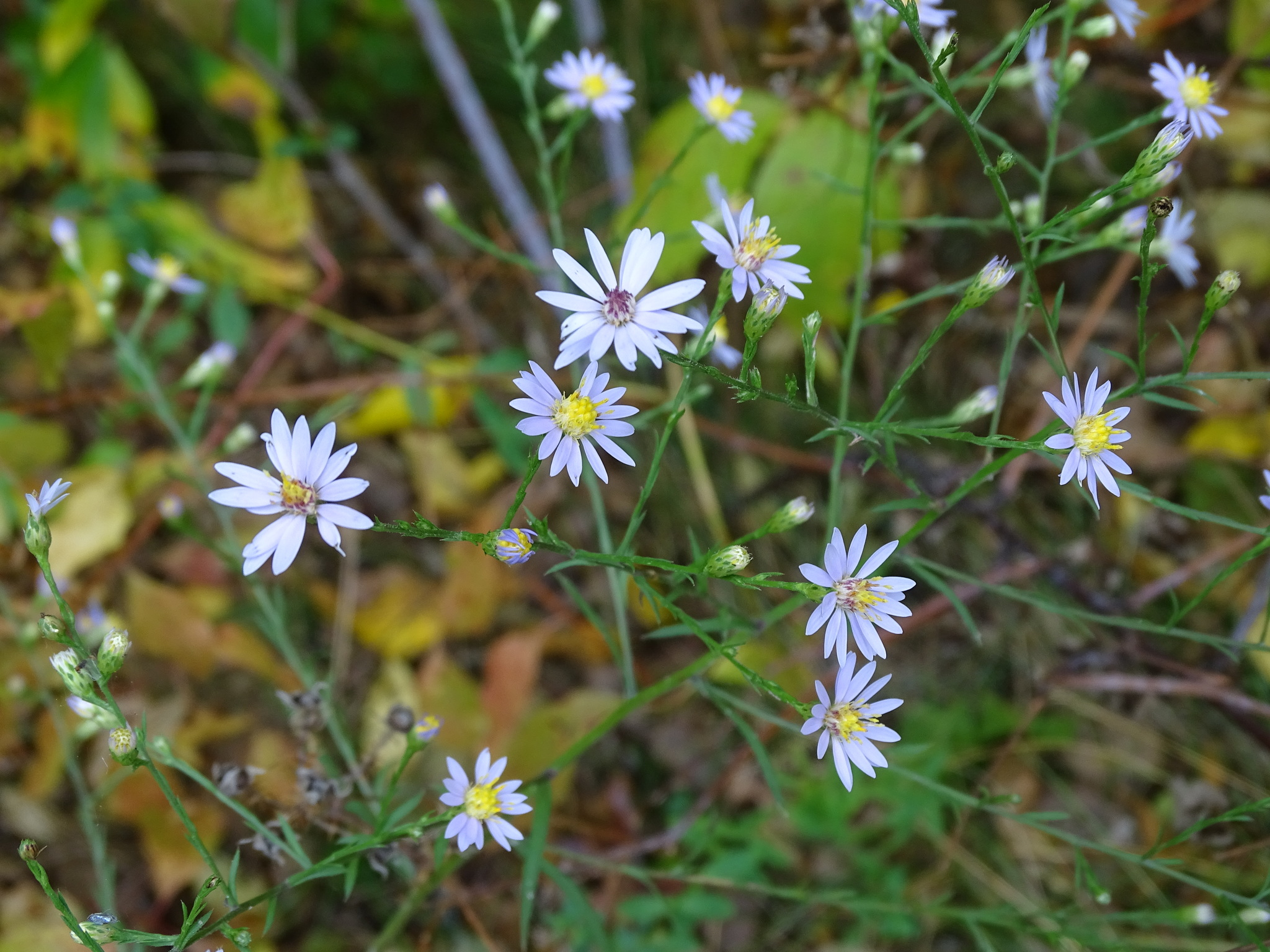
- Inflorescence, Ontario, Canada

Conservation status
- Secure (NatureServe)

Scientific classification
- Kingdom: Plantae
- Clade: Tracheophytes
- Clade: Angiosperms
- Clade: Eudicots
- Clade: Asterids
- Order: Asterales
- Family: Asteraceae
- Genus: Symphyotrichum
- Subgenus: Symphyotrichum subg. Symphyotrichum
- Section: Symphyotrichum sect. Symphyotrichum
- Species: S. oolentangiense

Binomial name
- Symphyotrichum oolentangiense (Riddell) G.L.Nesom
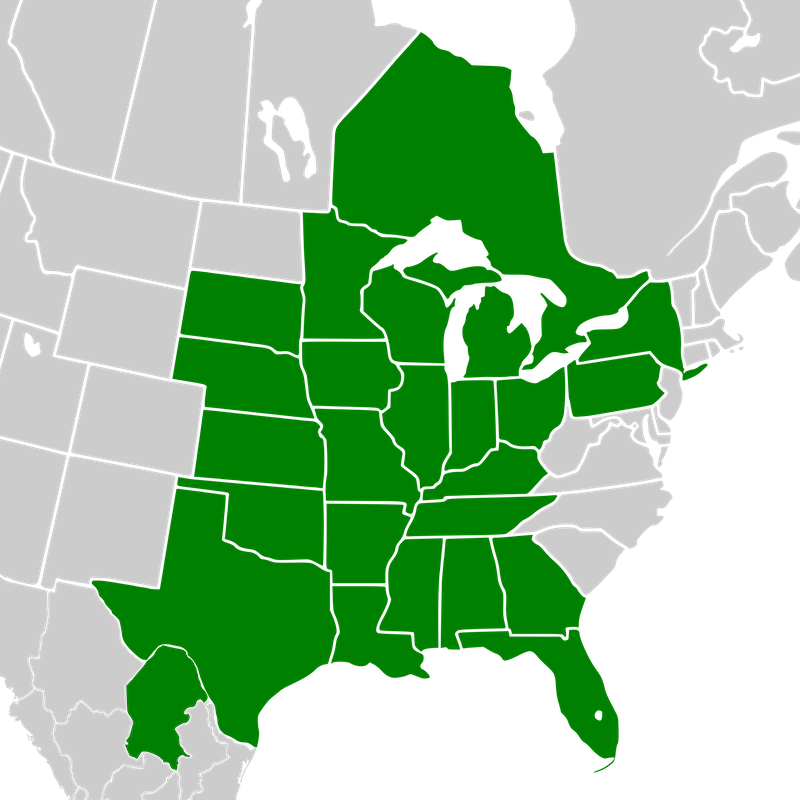
- Native distribution

Synonyms
- Basionym: Aster oolentangiensis Riddell; Alphabetical list: Aster azureus Lindl.; Aster azureus f. incarnatus Farw.; Aster azureus f. laevicaulis Fernald; Aster azureus var. poaceus (E.S.Burgess ex Small) Fernald; Aster azureus var. scabrior Engelm. ex Small; Aster capillaceus E.S.Burgess; Aster capillaris E.S.Burgess; Aster oolentangiensis f. incarnatus (Farw.) A.G.Jones; Aster oolentangiensis var. laevicaulis (Fernald) A.G.Jones; Aster oolentangiensis var. poaceus (E.S.Burgess) A.G.Jones; Aster poaceus E.S.Burgess; Aster vernalis Engelm. ex E.S.Burgess; Symphyotrichum oolentangiense var. laevicaule (Fernald) Mohlenbr.; Symphyotrichum oolentangiense var. poaceum (E.S.Burgess) G.L.Nesom

= Symphyotrichum oolentangiense =

Species of plant in the aster family

Symphyotrichum oolentangiense (formerly Aster oolentangiensis and Aster azureus), commonly known as skyblue aster and azure aster, is a species of flowering plant in the family Asteraceae native to eastern North America.

== Description ==
The plants are 20 to 150 centimeters (3/4 to 5 feet) tall with one to several herbaceous stems. The alternate and simple leaves have a rough texture. The composite flowers, produced between August and October, have blue to violet rays.

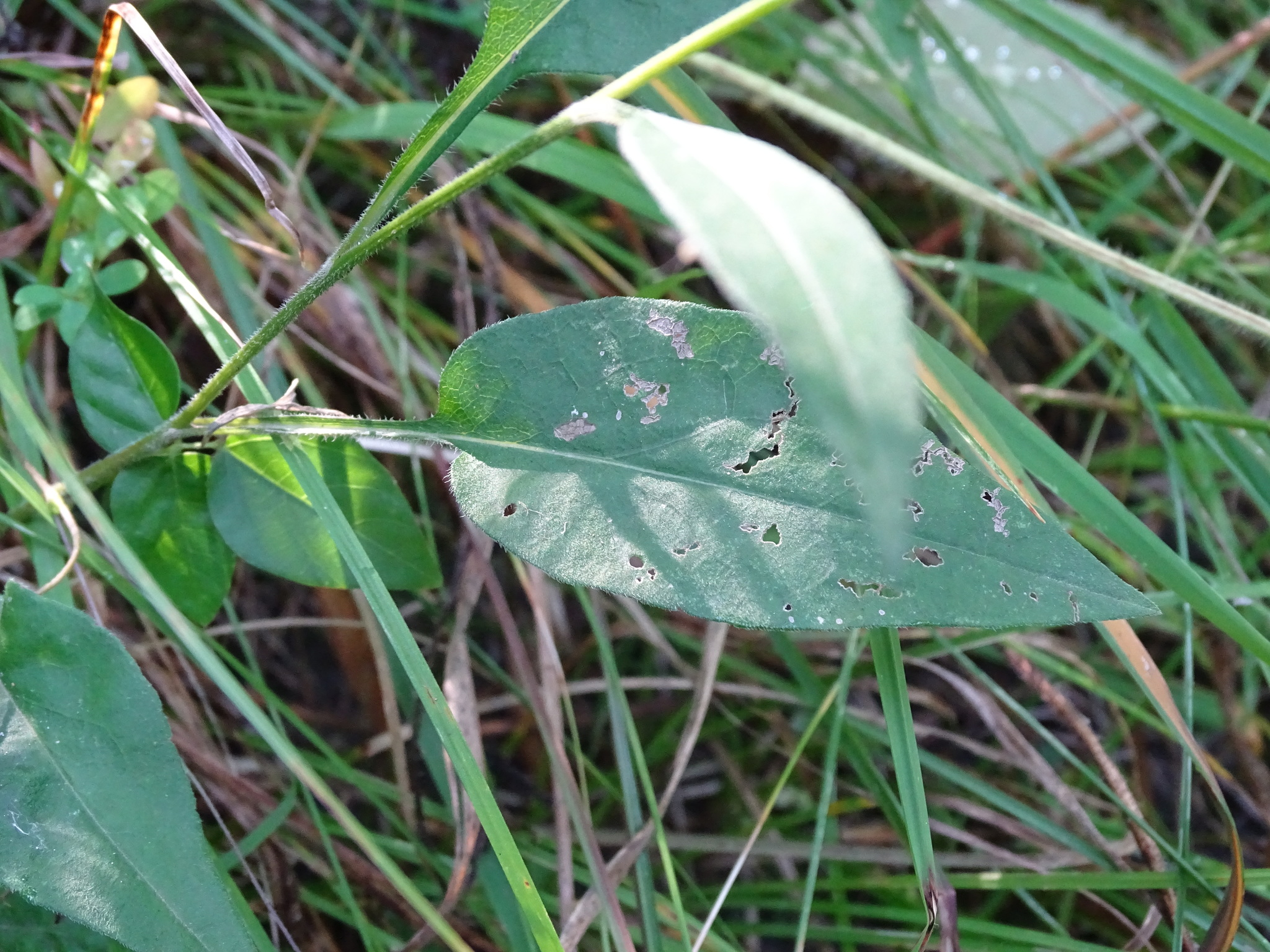
Leaf, Ontario, Canada

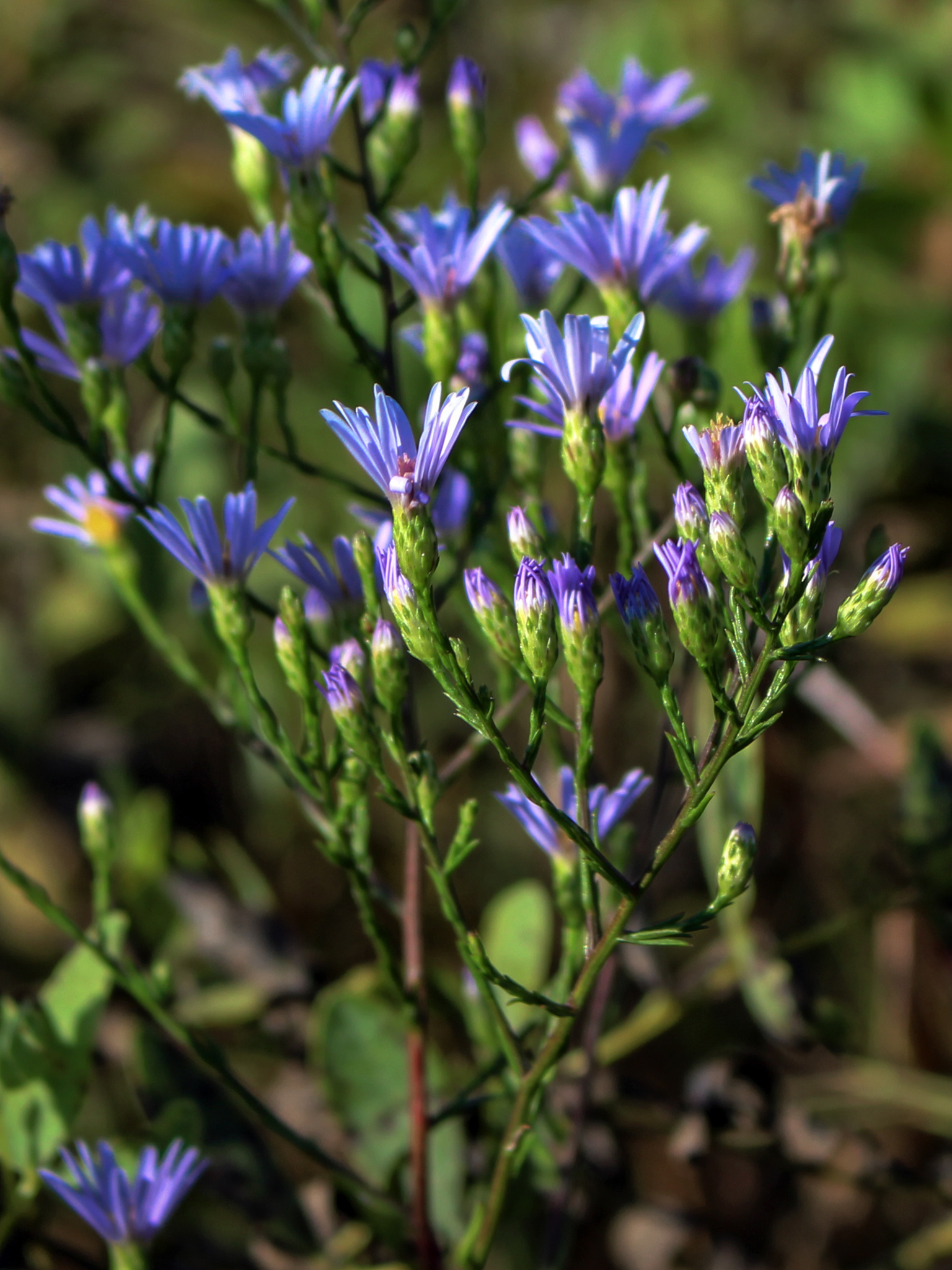
Large inflorescence showing many involucres

== Taxonomy ==
American botanist John Leonard Riddell originally described this species in a publication dated to April 1835 as Aster oolentangiensis after finding it in forests on the Olentangy River near Worthington, Ohio. Riddell originally misspelled the name of the river with two Os. The synonym Aster azureus has also been used, but this was not published until November 1835, (Note: The name Aster azureus was published in the Companion to the Botanical Magazine 1: 98. The cover page only dates this to 1835; this part was published in November.) so Riddell's epithet has priority.

Along with many other species, Symphyotrichum oolentangiense was formerly included in the genus Aster. However, this broad circumscription of Aster is polyphyletic, and the North American asters are now classified in Symphyotrichum and several other genera.

== Distribution and habitat ==
Symphyotrichum oolentangiense is found in prairies, open woodlands, savannahs and other open habitats. It occurs widely in the Midwestern United States and in eastern prairies, from Texas to Minnesota. It also extends into Mexico in Coahuila and to Ontario in Canada. The species is endangered in New York.

== Ecology ==
The flowers attract a wide variety of insect species, including bees, bee flies, butterflies, beetles, and others. A wide variety of herbivorous insects also consume the vegetation. The seeds are dispersed by wind. The species is typical of higher quality natural areas, especially those with disturbances such as wildfire.
