= Laura Rericha =

American biologist

- Born: 1971 (age 54–55); Elmhurst, Illinois
- Other names: Laura Anchor; Laura Rericha-Anchor
- Known for: Co-authorship of Flora of the Chicago Region (2017)
- Scientific career
- Fields: Botany, ornithology, entomology
- Institutions: Forest Preserves of Cook County; Conservation Research Institute

Laura Rericha-Anchor is an American biologist with expertise in botany, ornithology, entomology, and ecology of the Midwestern United States.

== Career ==
Largely self-taught since a young age, Rericha began as a naturalist with the Forest Preserves of Cook County, Illinois in 1997 and was mentored by Floyd Swink. As of 2021, she worked as a wildlife biologist for the Forest Preserves of Cook County and as a research associate with Conservation Research Institute. Rericha was recognized by the Board of Commissioners of Cook County in May 2017 for her significant contribution to science through the publishing of Flora of the Chicago Region, "enabling both the professional and amateur botanist to better understand our region’s plants and insects". In addition to detailing the over 3,100 vascular plant species found in the region, the book documents hundreds of new ecological relationships between specific plants and their associated insects and other fauna.

== Publications ==
The standard author abbreviation Rericha is used to indicate this person as the author when citing a botanical name.

- Wilhelm, Gerould; Rericha, Laura (1 April 2003). Lichens of the Chicago Region (PDF) (Report). Archived from the original on 23 September 2018.
- Wilhelm, Gerould; Rericha, Laura (April 2007). Timber Hill Savanna, Assessment of Landscape Management (PDF) (Report). Archived from the original on 4 November 2019.
- Wilhelm, Gerould; Rericha, Laura (July 2016). "A New Species of Hypericum (Hypericaceae) and Some New Combinations in the Vascular Flora of the Chicago Region". The Michigan Botanist. 55 (3–4): 89–96. Archived (PDF) from the original on 14 October 2021.
- Wilhelm, Gerould; Rericha, Laura (2017). Flora of the Chicago Region: a Floristic and Ecological Synthesis. Illustrated by Lowther, M.M. Indianapolis, Indiana: Indiana Academy of Science. ISBN 978-1-88336-215-7. OCLC 983207050.
- Wilhelm, Gerould; Rericha, Laura (July 2018). "Thismia americana: a Chicago Endemic or an Elaborate Hoax?". The Great Lakes Botanist. 57 (3–4): 150–157. Archived (PDF) from the original on 24 November 2019.
