= Gerould Wilhelm =

American botanist and lichenologist

- Born: 1948 (age 77–78); Franklin, New Hampshire
- Education: Florida State University, Southern Illinois University Carbondale
- Scientific career
- Fields: Botany, Lichenology
- Workplaces: United States Army Corps of Engineers, Morton Arboretum, Conservation Design Forum, Conservation Research Institute
- Thesis: Vascular Flora of the Pensacola Region (1984)
- Doctoral advisor: Robert H. Mohlenbrock

Gerould S. Wilhelm (born 1948) is an American botanist and lichenologist. He is known as author of several floras of the Chicago Region and the development of the Floristic Quality Assessment methodology, a tool to assess the integrity of natural areas. He is the director of research at Conservation Research Institute, a nonprofit organization "dedicated to the promotion of planning, design, restoration, and long-term management of sustainable ecological systems in built and natural environments through applied research, education, and outreach."

== Selected publications ==
The standard author abbreviation G.Wilh. is used to indicate this person as the author when citing a botanical name.

- Wilhelm, Gerould S. (1977). Ecological assessment of open land areas in Kane County, Illinois (Report). Kane County Urban Development Division.
- Wilhelm, Gerould S. (1984). Vascular flora of the Pensacola Region (PhD). Southern Illinois University Carbondale.
- Wilhelm, Gerould (1980). Special Vegetation of the Indiana Dunes National Lakeshore (Report). The National Park Service.
- Swink, Floyd; Wilhelm, Gerould (1979). Plants of the Chicago Region.
- Swink, Floyd; Wilhelm, Gerould (1994). Plants of the Chicago Region. Indiana Academy of Sciences.
- Wilhelm, Gerould; Rericha, Laura (April 2007). Timber Hill Savanna, Assessment of Landscape Management (PDF) (Report). Archived from the original on 4 November 2019.
- Wilhelm, Gerould (2015). A Doctrine for Sustainability (PDF) (Report). Archived from the original on May 7, 2021.
- Wilhelm, Gerould; Rericha, Laura (2016). "A New Species of Hypericum (Hypericaceae) and Some New Combinations in the Vascular Flora of the Chicago Region" (PDF). The Michigan Botanist. 55 (3–4): 89–96.
- Wilhelm, Gerould; Rericha, Laura (2017). Flora of the Chicago Region: A Floristic and Ecological Synthesis. Indiana Academy of Sciences.
