= Floristic Quality Assessment =

Ecological integrity assessment

Floristic Quality Assessment (FQA) is a tool used in the United States to assess an area's ecological integrity based on its plant species composition. Floristic Quality Assessment was originally developed in order to assess the likelihood that impacts to an area "would be irreversible or irretrievable...to make standard comparisons among various open land areas, to set conservation priorities, and to monitor site management or restoration efforts." The concept was developed by Gerould Wilhelm in the 1970s in a report on the natural lands of Kane County, Illinois. In 1979 Wilhelm and Floyd Swink codified this "scoring system" for the 22-county Chicago Region.

== Coefficient of conservatism ==
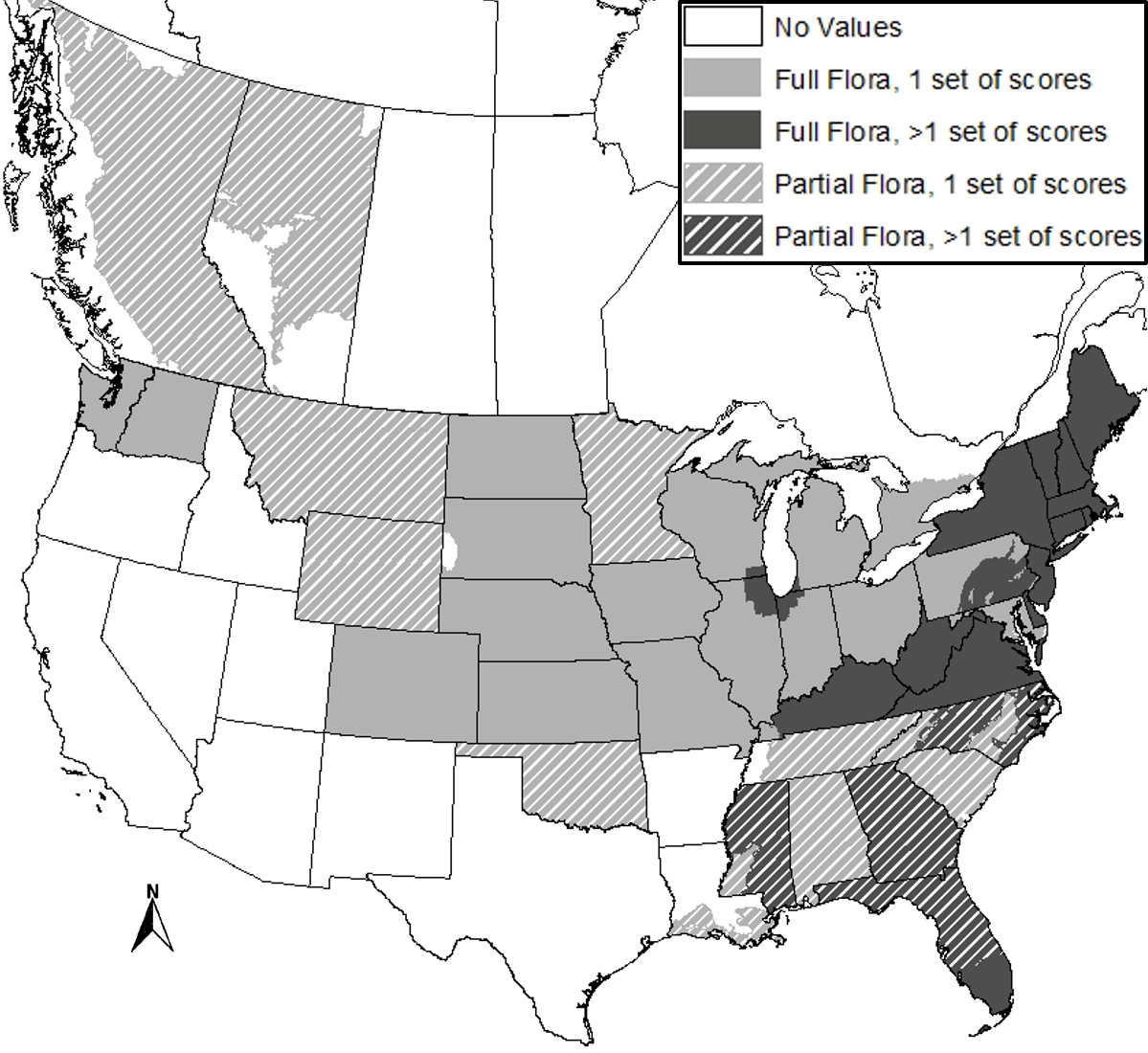
Regions with C-values assigned to their flora (as of 2019)

Each plant species in a region is assigned a coefficient of conservatism, also known as a C-value, ranging between 0 and 10. A plant species with a higher score (e.g. 10) has a lower tolerance to environmental degradation such as overgrazing or development and therefore is naturally restricted to undisturbed, remnant habitats. Non-native plants are either assigned a C-value of 0 or are excluded from assessments. In the Chicago Region, 84% of the native plant species have a C-value of 4 or greater. Plants with a C-value of 4 or greater rarely naturally move from a remnant area to surrounding degraded land. For example, the federally endangered Dalea foliosa has a C-value of 10.

C-values are assigned within specific ecological and geographic regions by botanical experts familiar with the species' autecology within the respective regions. As of February 2018, there were more than 50 different FQA databases ranging from the Gulf Coastal Plain to western Washington, though most databases represented regions in the eastern and central United States and Canada.

The mean C-value ($\bar{C}$) is calculated based on an inventory of plants. An area with a native mean C-value of 3.5 or higher likely has "sufficient floristic quality to be of at least marginal natural area quality." Remnant natural areas with mean C-values of 4.0 or greater are unmitigable.

== Floristic Quality Index ==
The Floristic Quality Index (FQI, or Rating Index according to Swink and Wilhelm) is calculated by multiplying the mean C value by the square root of the total number of species:

$\bar{C}\sqrt{n}$

For example, the FQI for Nelson Lake Marsh was 78 in 1994 and that for Russell R. Kirt Prairie was about 30 in 1999.
