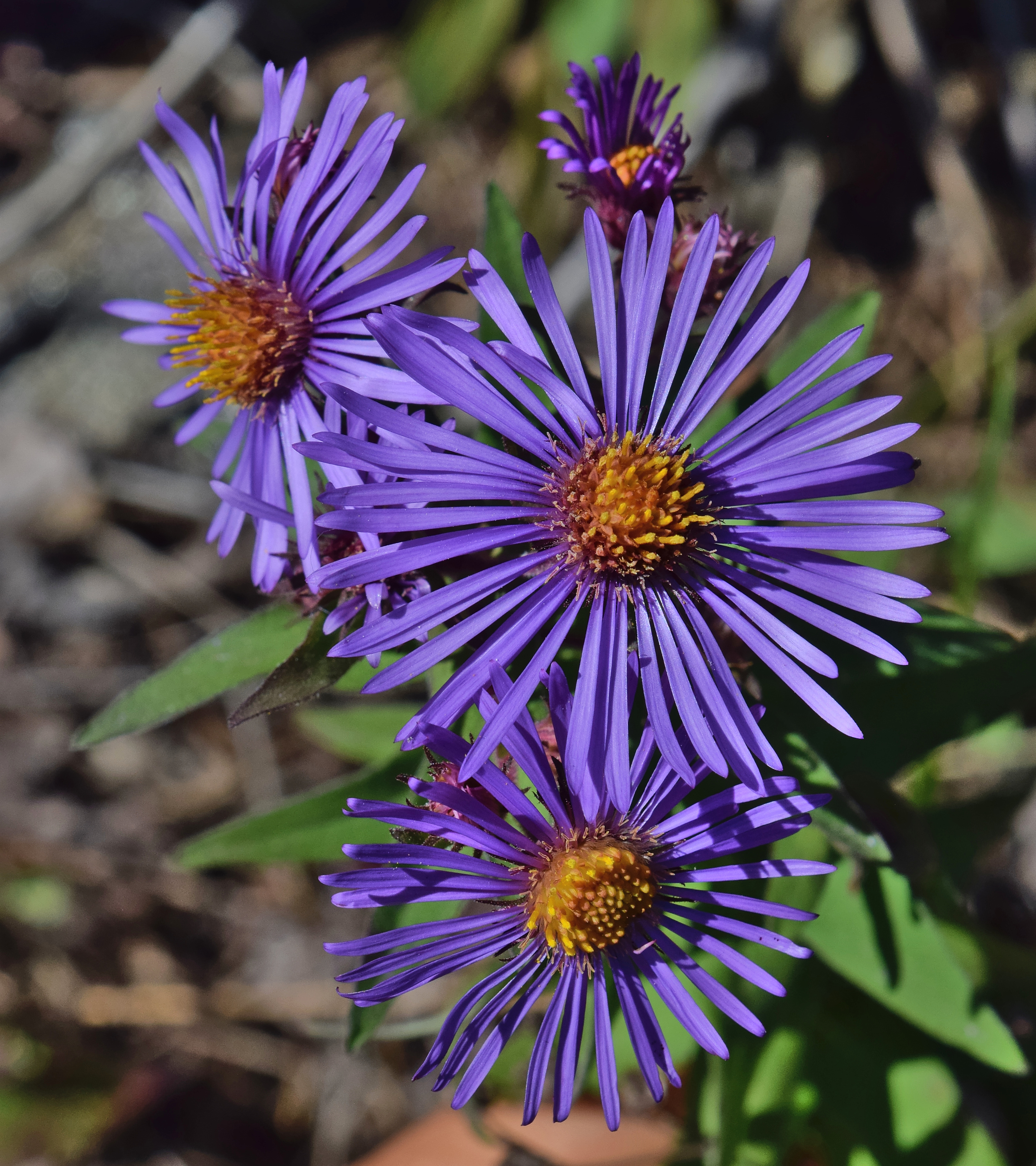
- Rouge National Urban Park, Ontario

Conservation status
- Secure (NatureServe)

Scientific classification
- Kingdom: Plantae
- Clade: Tracheophytes
- Clade: Angiosperms
- Clade: Eudicots
- Clade: Asterids
- Order: Asterales
- Family: Asteraceae
- Genus: Symphyotrichum
- Subgenus: Symphyotrichum subg. Virgulus
- Section: Symphyotrichum sect. Polyliguli
- Species: S. novae-angliae

Binomial name
- Symphyotrichum novae-angliae (L.) G.L.Nesom
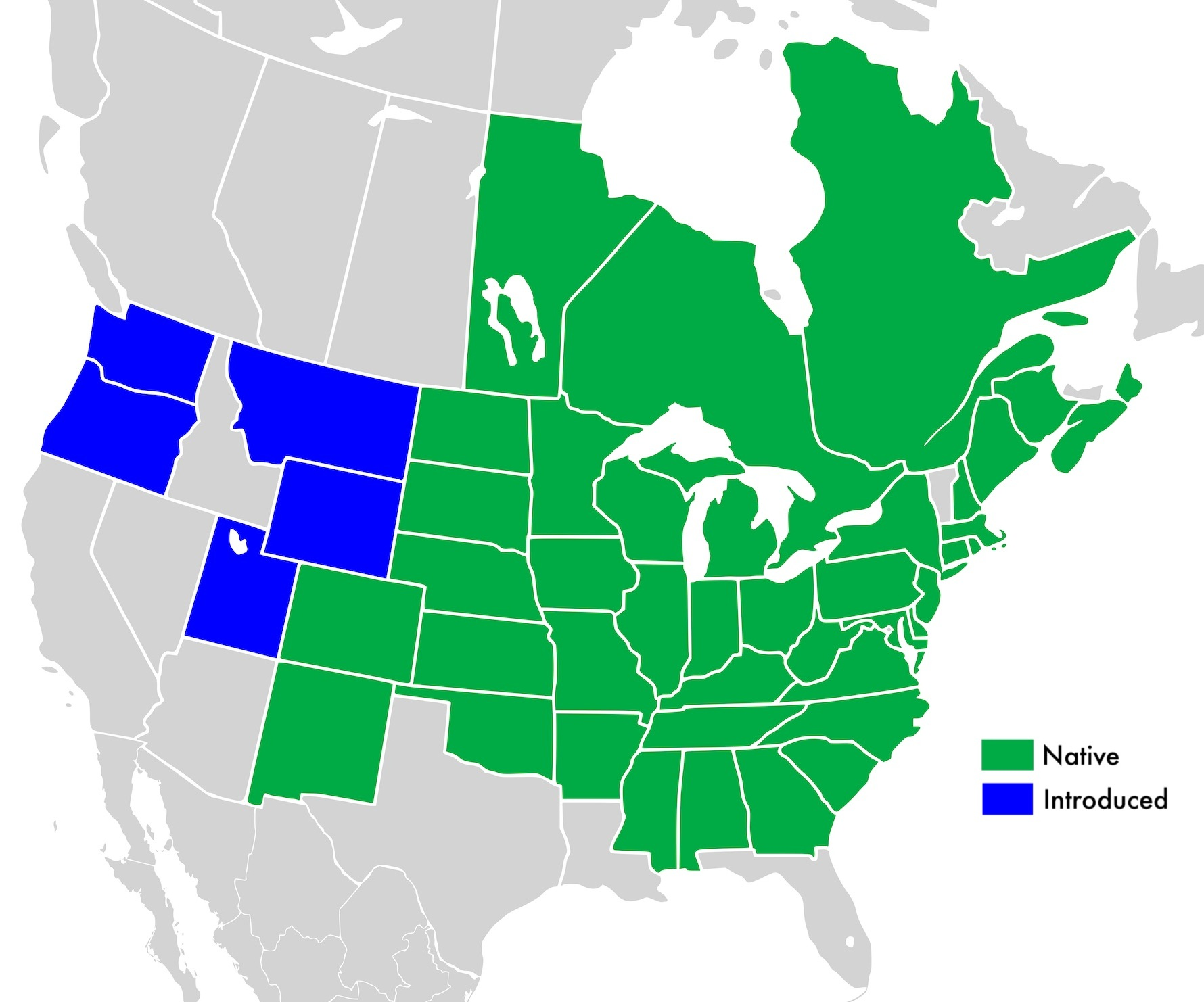
- North American distribution of S. novae-angliae, green is native, blue is introduced

Synonyms
- Basionym: Aster novae-angliae L.; Alphabetical list: Aster altissimus Moench; Aster amplexicaulis Lam.; Aster muehlenbergii Tausch; Aster novae-angliae f. geneseensis House; Aster novae-angliae var. monocephalus Farw.; Aster novae-angliae f. rosarius House; Aster novae-angliae f. roseus Britton; Aster novae-angliae var. roseus A.Gray; Aster novae-angliae f. spurius (Willd.) Voss; Aster repertus Mottet; Aster roseus Desf.; Aster spurius Willd.; Aster spurius var. novae-angliae (L.) W.P.C.Barton; Diplactis novanglia Raf.; Lasallea novae-angliae (L.) Semple & Brouillet; Symphyotrichum novae-angliae f. roseum (Desf.) G.Wilh. & Rericha; Virgulus novae-angliae (L.) Reveal & Keener

= Symphyotrichum novae-angliae =

Species of plant in the aster family

Symphyotrichum novae-angliae (formerly Aster novae-angliae) is a species of flowering plant in the aster family (Asteraceae) native to central and eastern North America. Commonly known as New England aster, hairy Michaelmas-daisy, or Michaelmas daisy, it is a perennial, herbaceous plant usually between 30 and 120 centimeters (1 and 4 feet) tall and 60 to 90 cm (2 to 3 ft) wide.

The usually deep purple flowers have up to 100 ray florets which are rarely pink or white. These surround the flower centers which are composed of just as many tiny yellow disk florets. The plant grows naturally in clumps, with several erect stems emerging from a single point. The stems are stout, hairy, and mostly unbranched. The untoothed, lance-shaped leaves clasp the stem with earlobe-like appendages, and the lower stem leaves often wither by the time of flowering.

New England aster generally grows in wet environments but also has been found in dry soil or sand. The seeds and nectar of this mostly conservationally secure species, which blooms August to November, are important to a wide variety of animals, including birds, bees, and butterflies. It has been introduced to Europe, Central Asia, Hispaniola, New Zealand, and some western states and provinces of North America.

The naturally occurring hybrid species of New England aster and white heath aster (Symphyotrichum ericoides) is named Symphyotrichum × amethystinum and is commonly known as amethyst aster. It can grow where the two parents are in close proximity. There are roughly 50 cultivars of Symphyotrichum novae-angliae available, including the award-winners 'Brunswick', 'Helen Picton', and 'James Ritchie'. It has been used by indigenous Americans, such as the Cherokee, Haudenosaunee, and Potawatomi, to heal multiple ailments.

== Description ==
New England aster is a clump-forming perennial and herbaceous plant. Usually it is between 30 and 120 centimeters (1 and 4 feet) tall and 60 to 90 cm (2 to 3 ft) wide. Sometimes it can reach heights of 180 to 240 cm (6 to 8 ft). It is cespitose, growing in clumps with several erect stems emerging from a single point. The stems are stout and mostly unbranched. The upper stems and leaves, along with some parts of the flower heads, are covered with tiny glands on tiny stalks called "stipitate glands".

=== Roots, stems, and leaves ===
The roots either come from caudices or short rhizomes and are thick, appearing woody, sometimes with cormoid portions. There are usually from one to five strong, erect, hairy stems growing from the root base. These can be brown or purplish in color, and largely stipitate-glandular higher up.

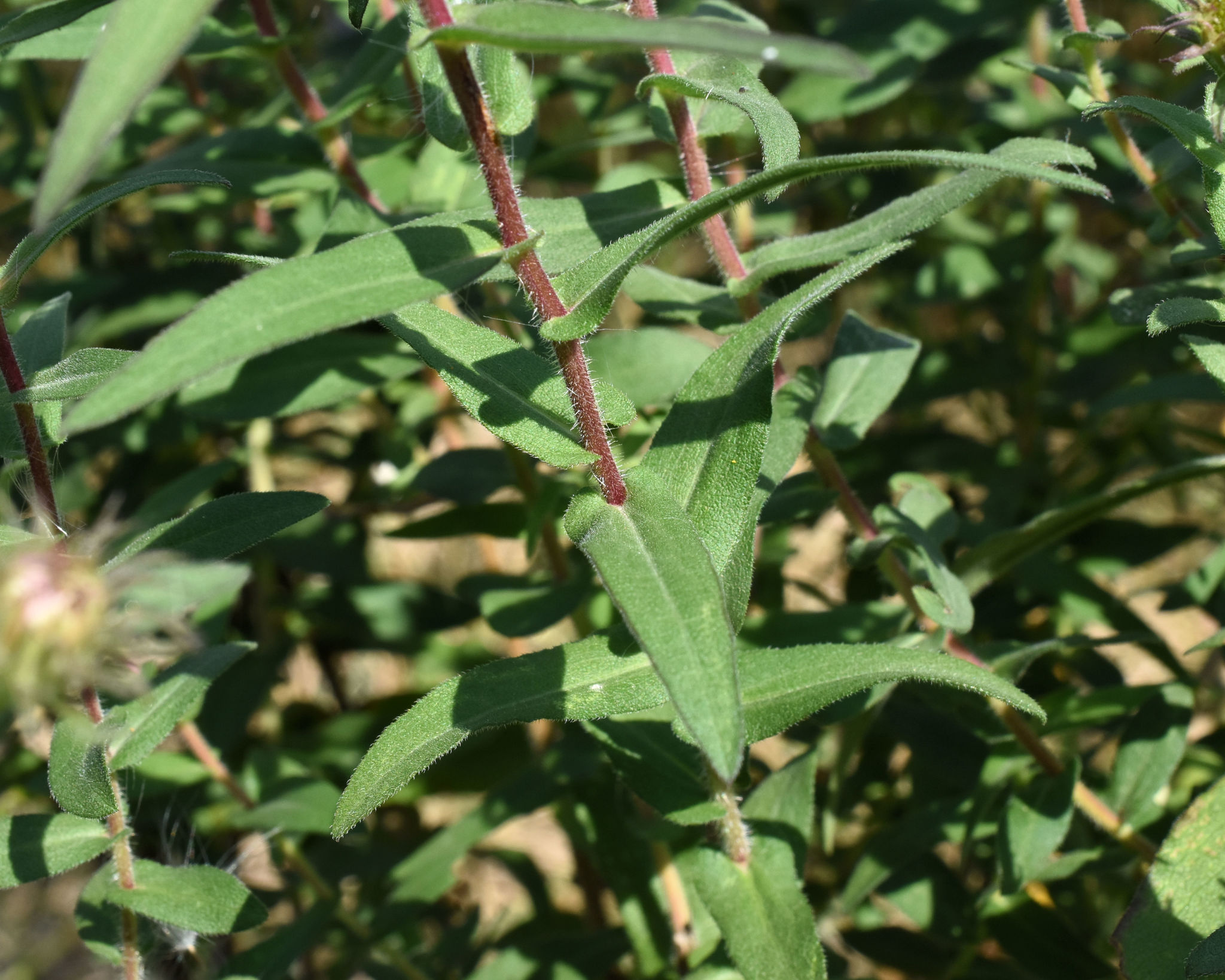
Auriculate-clasping leaves and hairy stem

Symphyotrichum novae-angliae has light to dark green, thin, and often stiff alternate and simple leaves. These occur at the base, on stems, and on the flower head branches which all have generally the same lanceolate appearance regardless of their location on the plant. The exception to this is the basal (ground level) leaves, which are usually spatulate or sometimes oblanceolate in shape. The lower stem leaves often wither or drop by the time the plant flowers.

The leaf margins are sometimes entire, meaning they are smooth on the edges with no teeth or lobes, or ciliate, meaning fringed with fine hairs on their edges. They are sessile, having no leafstalk, and they are auriculate, clasping the stem with earlobe-like appendages.

The leaves can vary in size, with the basal and distal (highest) leaves usually smaller than those occurring mid-stem. The basal leaves are sparsely hirsute and range 20–60 mm (0.79–2.36 in) in length and 5–15 mm (0.20–0.59 in) in width. Stem leaves are generally lanceolate or oblong with pointed tips and have stipitate glands on both sides. They average 50–100 mm (2.0–3.9 in) in length by 5–20 mm (0.20–0.79 in) wide. The distal leaves are oblanceolate, also stipitate-glandular, and softly-pubescent. Distal leaves range 30–80 mm (1.2–3.1 in) in length by 6–15 mm (0.24–0.59 in) wide.

=== Flowers ===
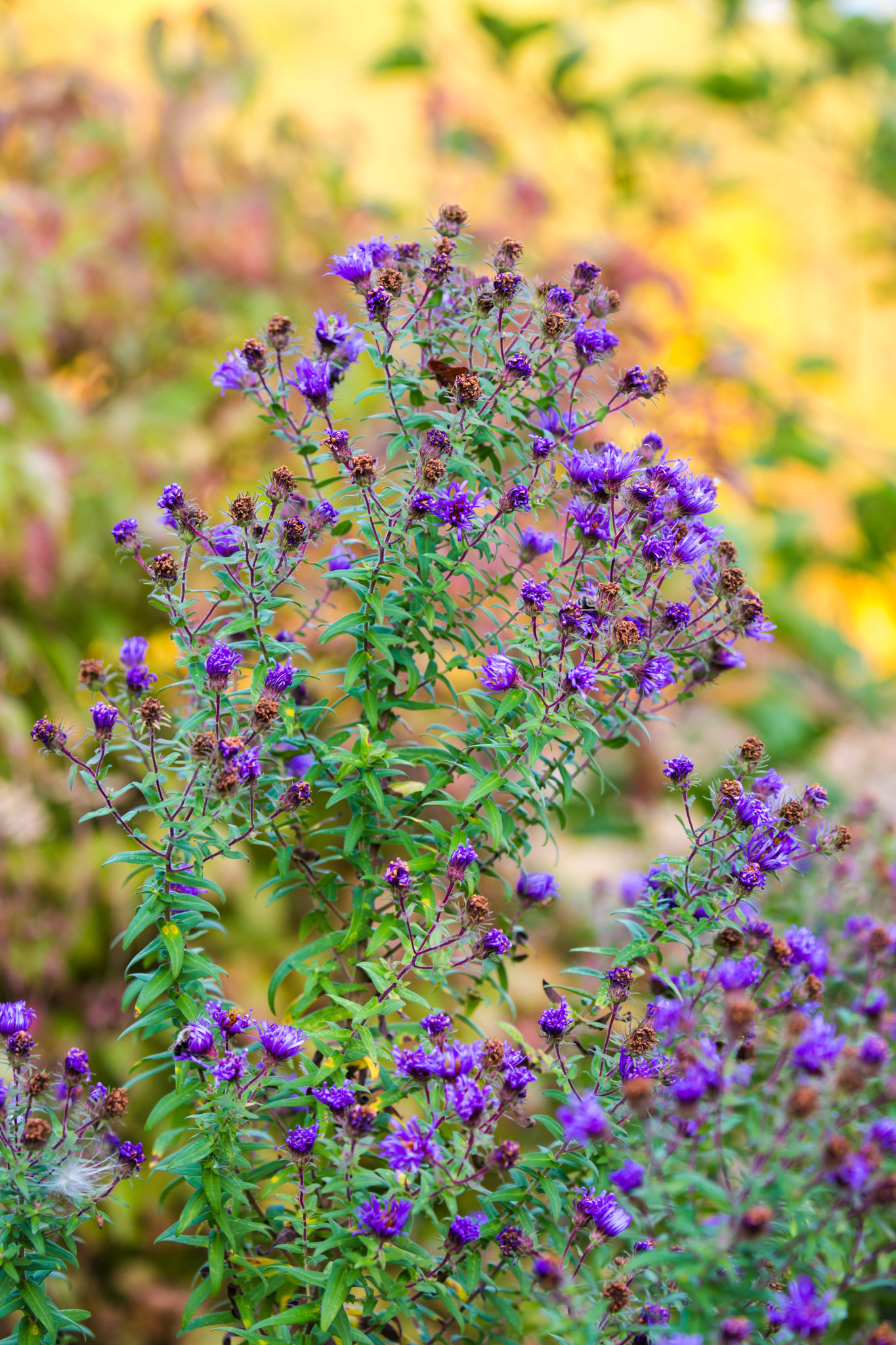
Growing pattern in paniculo-corymbiform arrays

Symphyotrichum novae-angliae is a late-summer and fall blooming perennial with flower heads opening as early as August in some locations and as late as November in others. The inflorescences grow in paniculo-corymbiform arrays, also called "cymose corymbs". These inflorescences have many leaves and are quite crowded, typically with one head at the end of each small branch. Each open flower head can be up to 5 cm (50 mm) in diameter.

==== Involucres and phyllaries ====
On the outside the flower heads of all members of the family Asteraceae are small specialized leaves called "phyllaries", and together they form the involucre that protects the individual flowers in the head before they open. The involucres of S. novae-angliae are campanulate (bell-shaped) to hemispheric (half-spherical) and usually 7–9 mm, with low and high involucral measurements of 5 mm and 15 mm, respectively. The phyllaries are spreading and often reflexed and are covered with stipitate glands. They are in 3–5 (sometimes up to 6) somewhat equal rows.

==== Florets ====
Each flower head is made up of ray florets and disk florets in about a one to one ratio, with the former accepting pollen before, and longer than, the latter. The 40–100 ray florets grow in one, two, or multiple series and are usually deep purple, rarely pink or white. They average 10–20 mm in length and 0.8–1.3 mm wide. Ray florets in the Symphyotrichum genus are exclusively female, each having a pistil (with style, stigma, and ovary) but no stamen; thus, ray florets accept pollen and each can develop a seed, but they produce no pollen.

The disks have 50–110 florets that start out as yellow and later turn purple. Each disk floret has an average range of 4.5–5.5 mm in depth, with low and high measurements of 4 mm and 7 mm, respectively. The disk floret is made up of 5 fused petals, collectively called a "corolla", which opens into 5 lobes. (Note: There are 5 lobes on the disk florets of all species in Symphyotrichum genus.) Disk florets in the Symphyotrichum genus are androgynous, each with both male (stamen, anthers, and filaments) and female reproductive parts; thus, a disk floret produces pollen and can develop a seed.

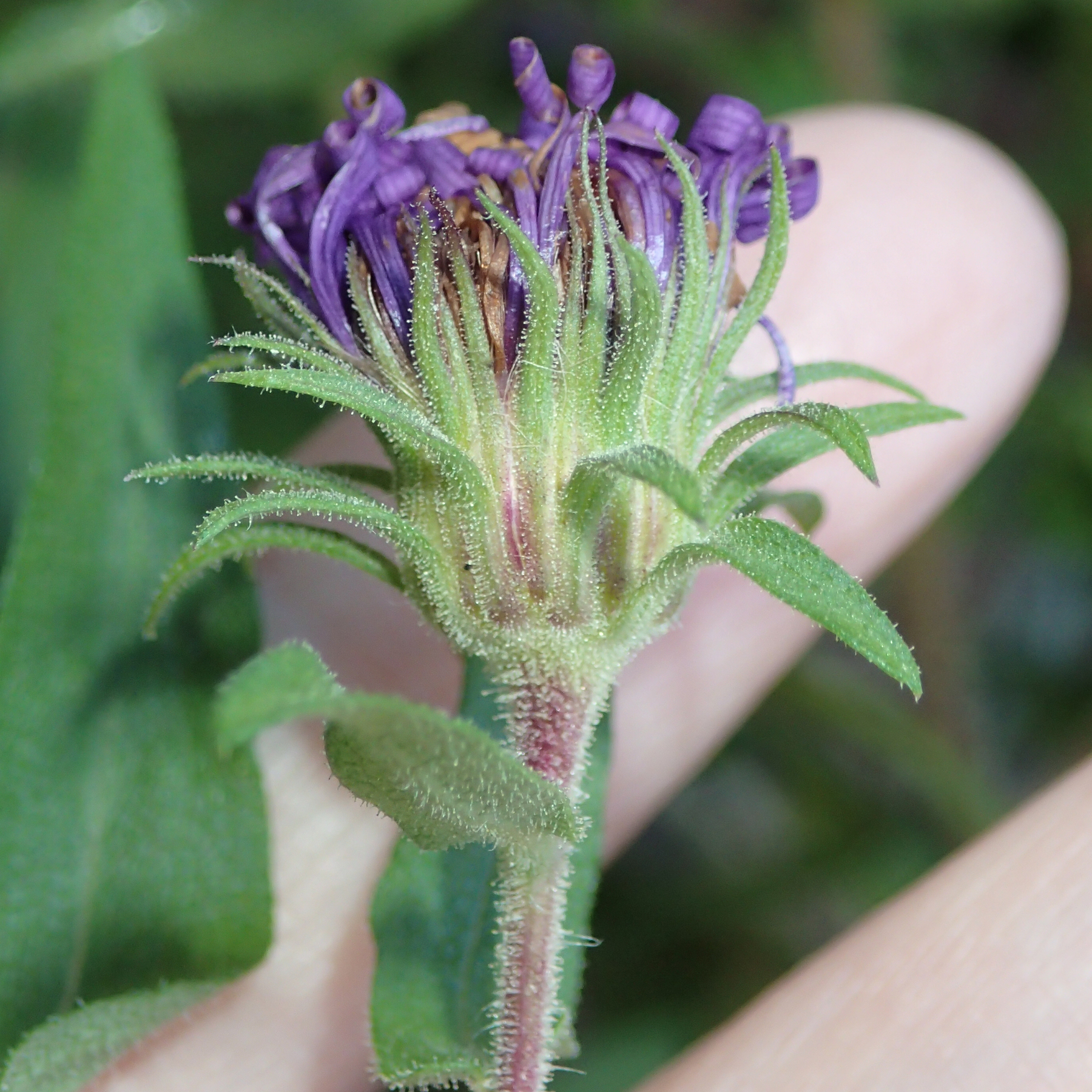
Flower head showing involucre and phyllaries

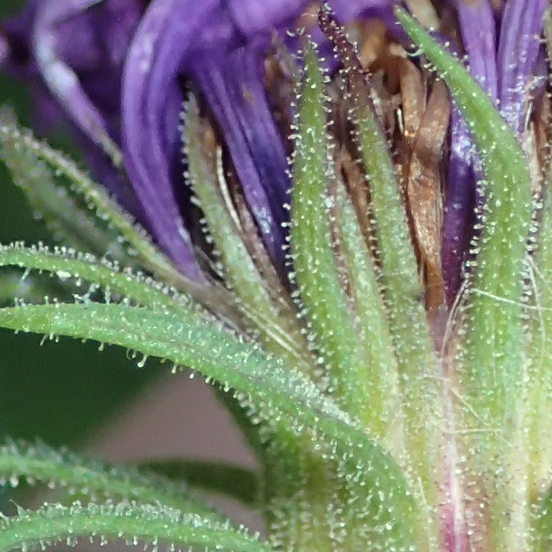
Close-up of stipitate-glandular trichomes on phyllaries

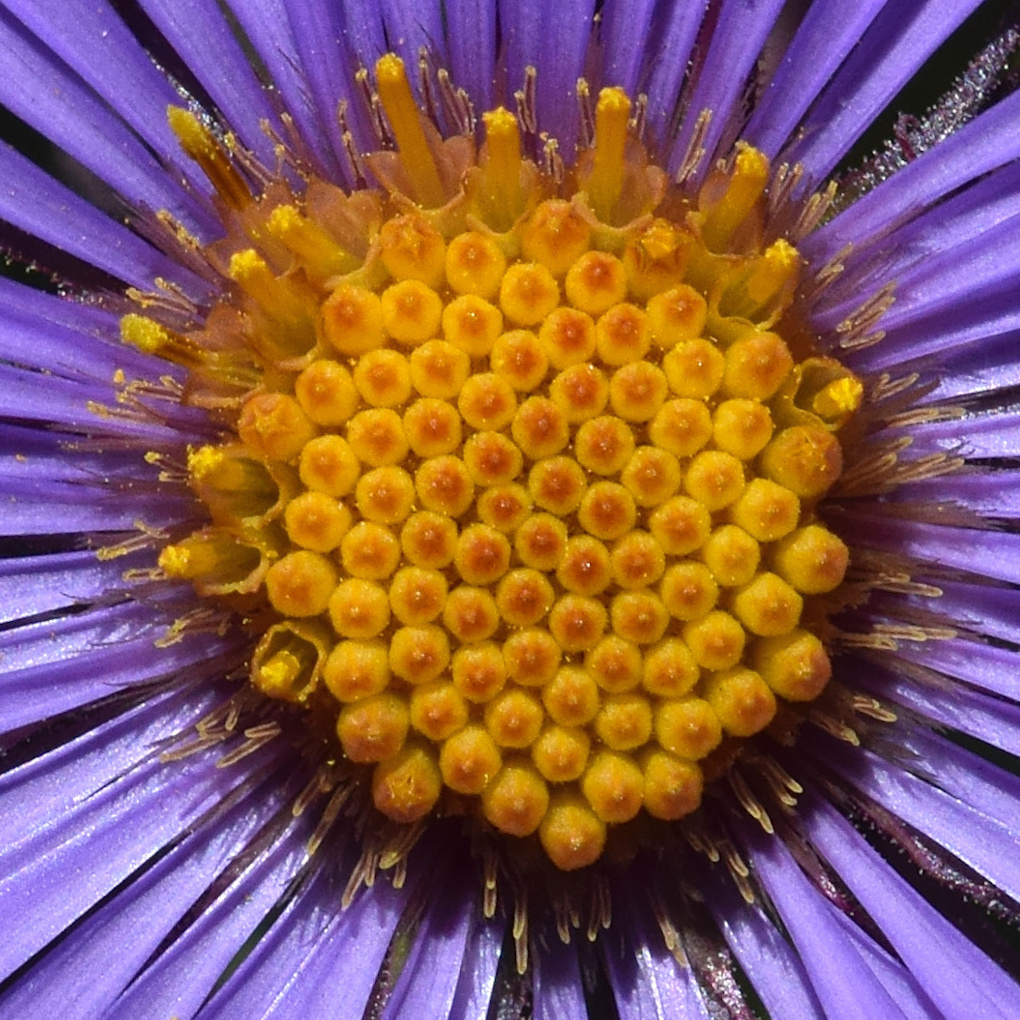
Close-up of ray and disk florets

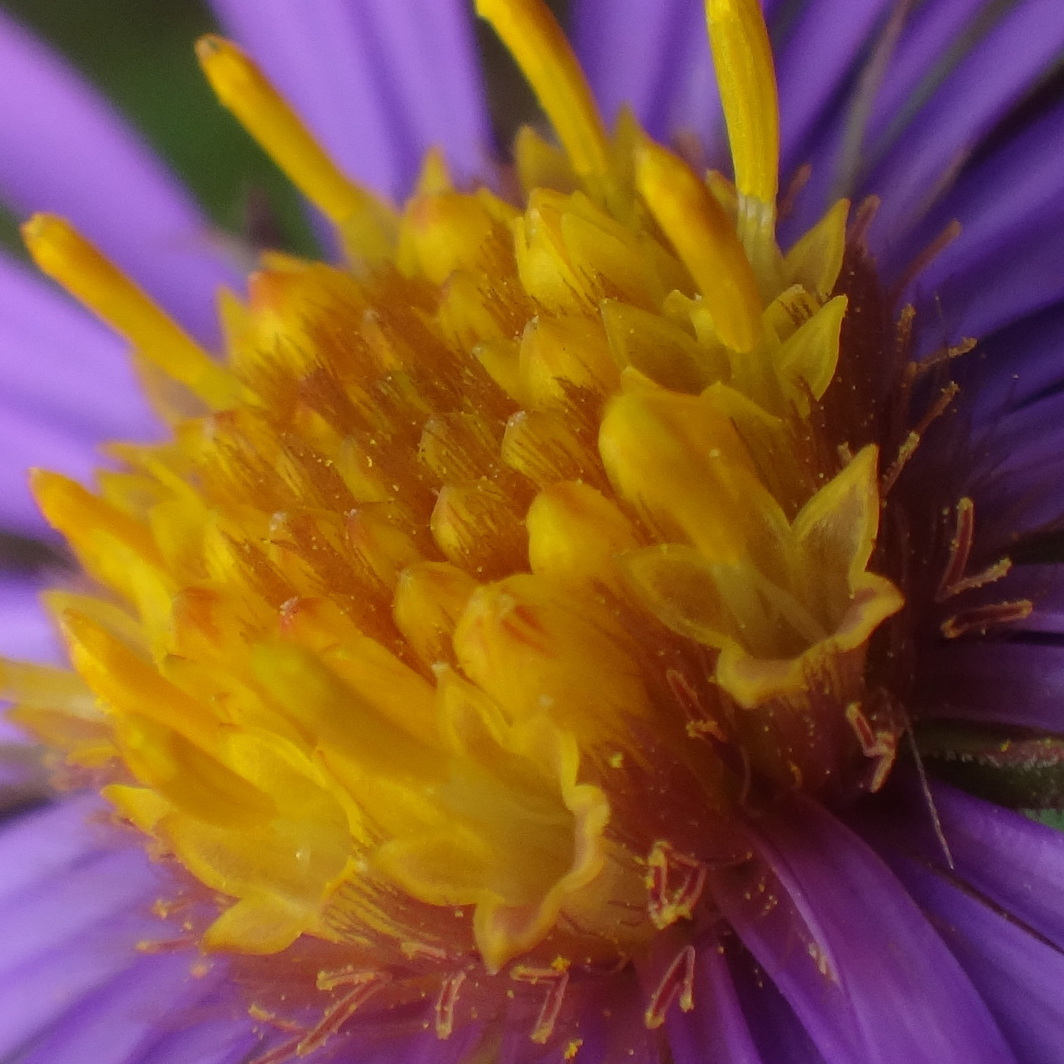
Close-up of disk florets

=== Fruit ===
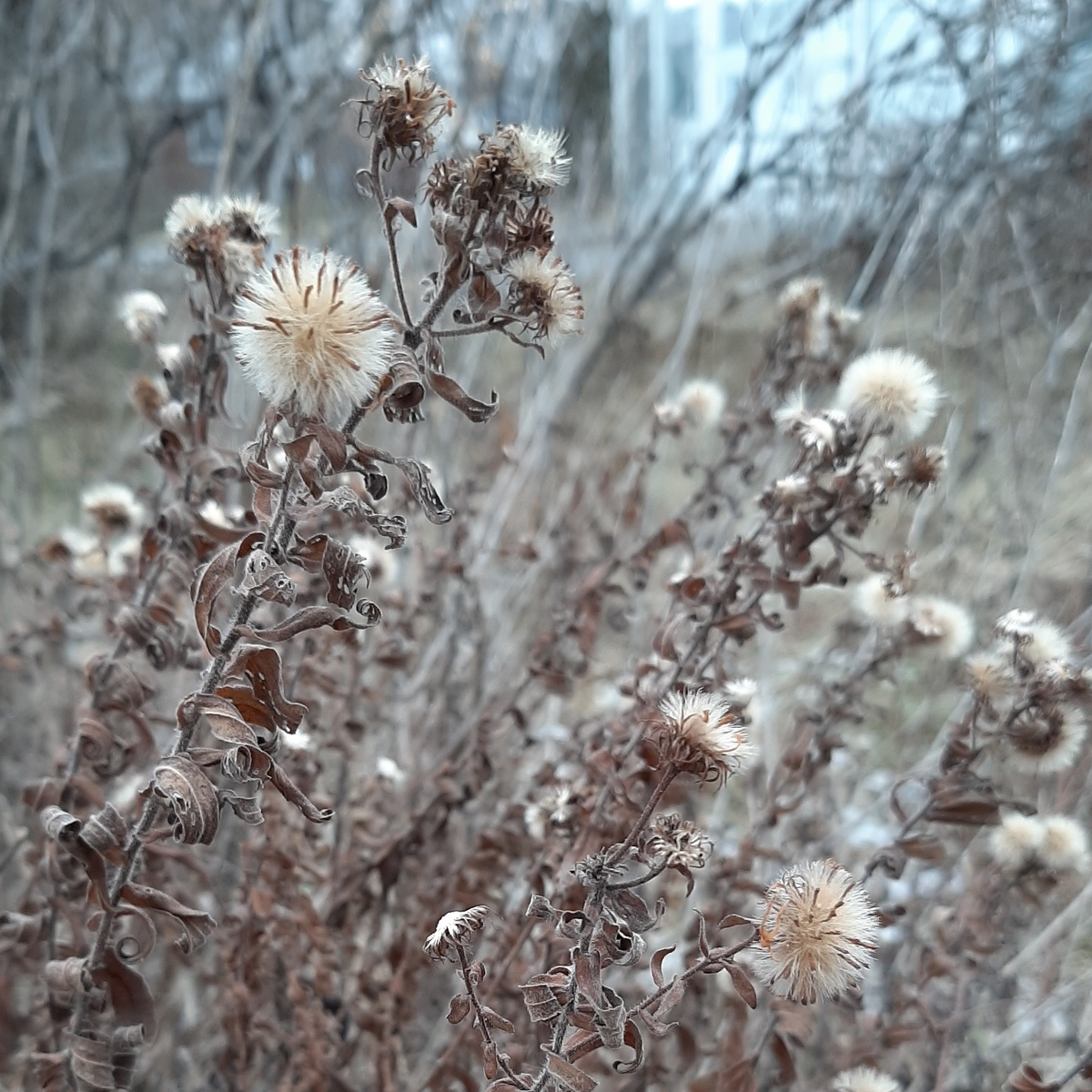
Large seed heads

The fruits of Symphyotrichum novae-angliae are seeds, not true achenes but cypselae, resembling an achene but surrounded by a calyx sheath. This is true for all members of the Asteraceae family. After pollination, they become dull purple or brown with an oblong or obconic shape, are uncompressed, and are 1.8–3 mm long and 0.6–1 mm wide with 7–10 nerves. They also have tufts of hairs called "pappi" which are tawny or rose-tinged in color and 4.5–6 mm long.

=== Chromosomes ===
S. novae-angliae has a monoploid number (also called "base number") of five chromosomes (x = 5). The species is diploid with a total chromosome count of 10.

== Taxonomy ==
=== History and classification ===
The species' basionym (original scientific name) is Aster novae-angliae L., and it has many taxonomic synonyms. Its name with author citations is Symphyotrichum novae-angliae (L.) G.L.Nesom. Swedish botanist Carl Linnaeus, in 1753, formally described what we know today as S. novae-angliae. It is a member of the genus Symphyotrichum classified in the subgenus Virgulus. It has been placed in section Grandiflori, sometimes segregated then within its own subsection Polyligulae. It also has been segregated within its own section Polyliguli. The cladogram shown follows the circumscription of section Polyliguli for the species.

Placement within Symphyotrichum
- - Symphyotrichum
    - subg. Chapmaniana
      (1 species)
    - subg. Astropolium
      (11 species)
    - subg. Virgulus
      - sect. Ericoidei
        - S. ericoides
        - S. falcatum
      - sect. Patentes
        - subsect. Brachyphylli
          - S. adnatum
          - S. walteri
        - subsect. Patentes
          - S. georgianum
          - S. patens
          - S. phlogifolium
      - sect. Grandiflori
        - subsect. Mexicanae
          - S. bimater
          - S. chihuahuense
          - S. hintonii
          - S. moranense
          - S. purpurascens
          - S. trilineatum
          - S. turneri
        - subsect. Grandiflori
          - S. campestre
          - S. estesii
          - S. fendleri
          - S. fontinale
          - S. grandiflorum
          - S. oblongifolium
          - S. pygmaeum
          - S. yukonense
      - sect. Polyliguli
        S. novae-angliae
      - sect. Concolores
        - S. concolor
        - S. lucayanum
        - S. plumosum
        - S. pratense
        - S. sericeum
    - subg. Ascendentes
      (2 species)
    - subg. Symphyotrichum
      (55 species)

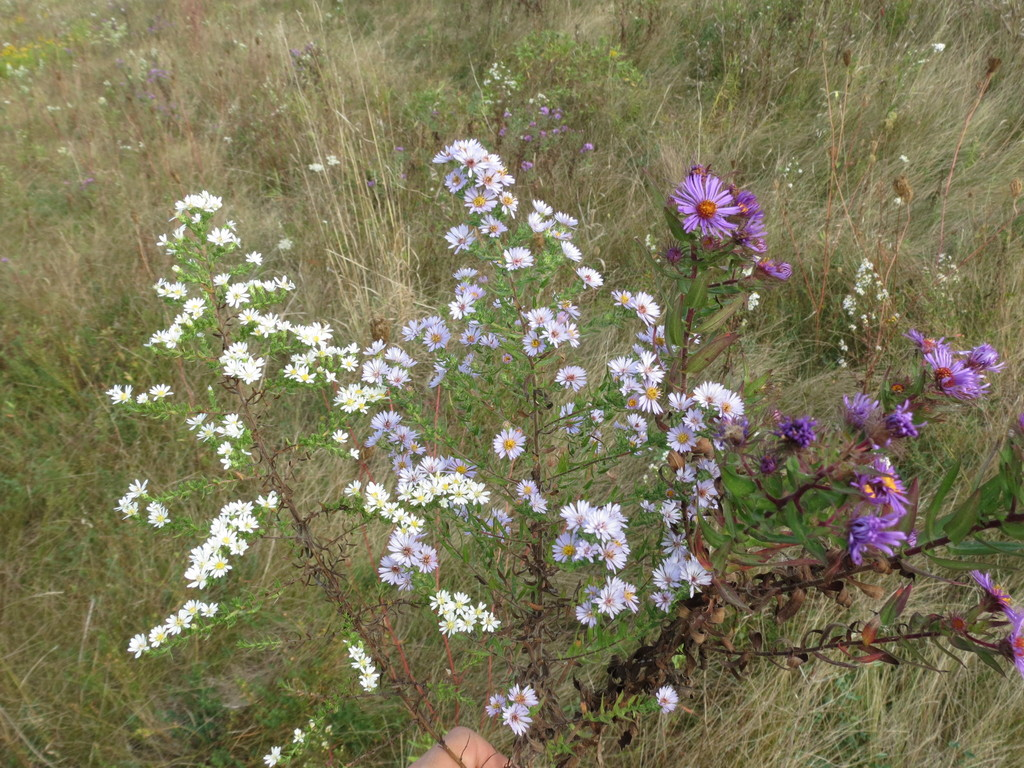
S. × amethystinum, center, is a hybrid between S. novae-angliae, right, and S. ericoides, left.

Several varieties and forms have been described, differing in flower color, but these generally are not recognized and are considered taxonomic synonyms of the species. F1 hybridization with S. ericoides can occur where the ranges of these two species overlap. Named Symphyotrichum × amethystinum (amethyst aster), the hybrid is intermediate between the parent species in most respects. No other hybrids with S. novae-angliae have been reported.

=== Etymology ===
The genus name, Symphyotrichum, is a Botanical Latin construction derived from the Greek συμφύω (sumphúō) meaning to make or bring together and θρίξ (thrĭ́x) hair. The species name, novae-angliae, refers to New England. The vernacular name "Michaelmas daisy" derives from the various asters, including this species, that tend to flower around September 29, the Feast of St. Michael.

The species' former genus, Aster, comes from the Ancient Greek word ἀστήρ (astḗr), meaning "star", referring to the shape of the flower. The word "aster" was used to describe a star-like flower as early as 1542 in De historia stirpium commentarii insignes, a book by the German physician and botanist Leonhart Fuchs. An old common name for Astereae species using the suffix "-wort" is "starwort", also spelled "star-wort" or "star wort". An early use of this name can be found in the same work by Fuchs as Sternkraut, translated from German literally as "star herb" (Stern Kraut). The name "star-wort" was in use by Aiton in his 1789 Hortus Kewensis for Aster novae-angliae. He used the common names "New England cluster'd star-wort" and "New England panicl'd star-wort" in this work.

== Distribution and habitat ==
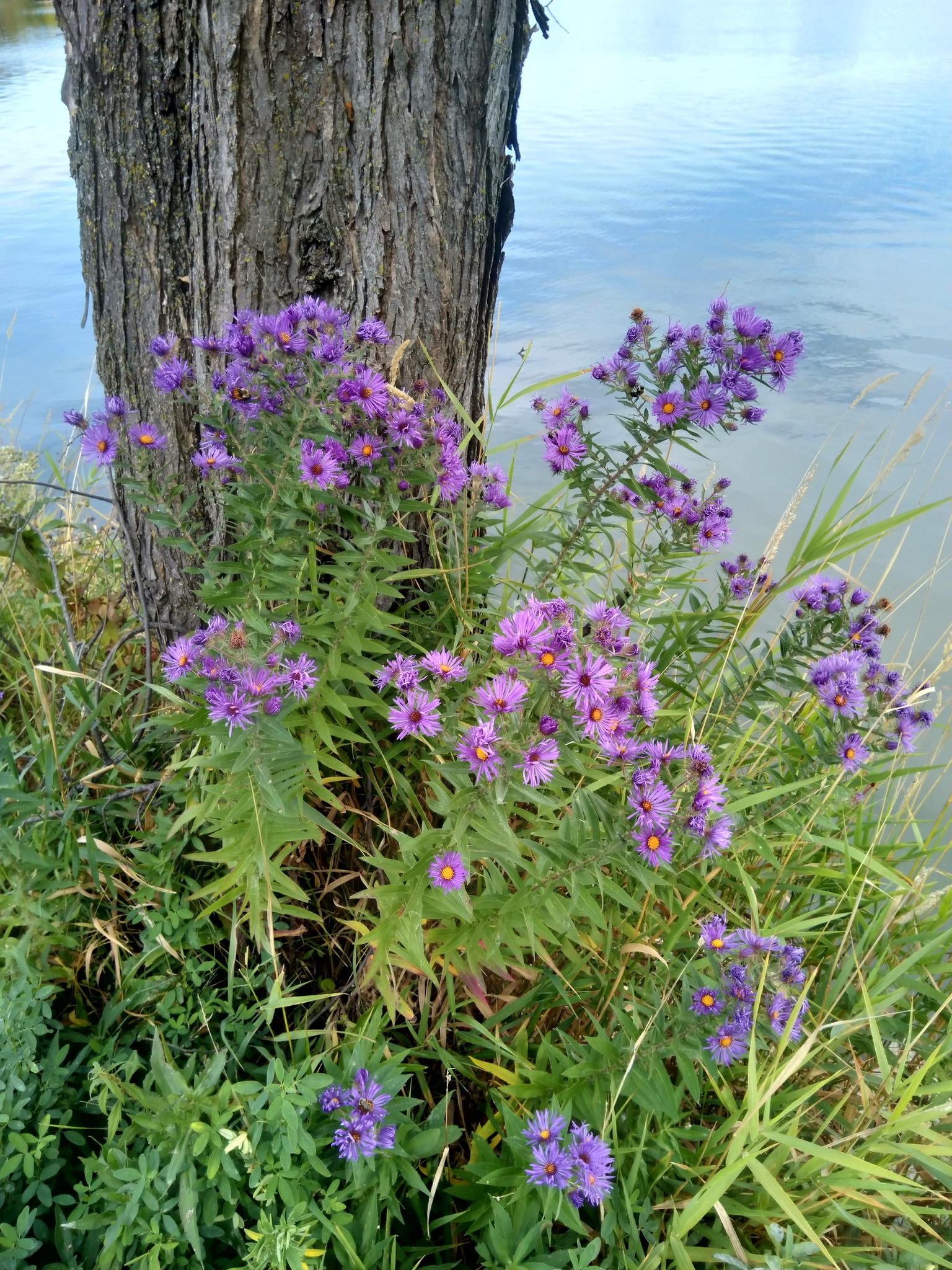
Growing in a lakeside habitat at Lake Nokomis, Minneapolis, Minnesota

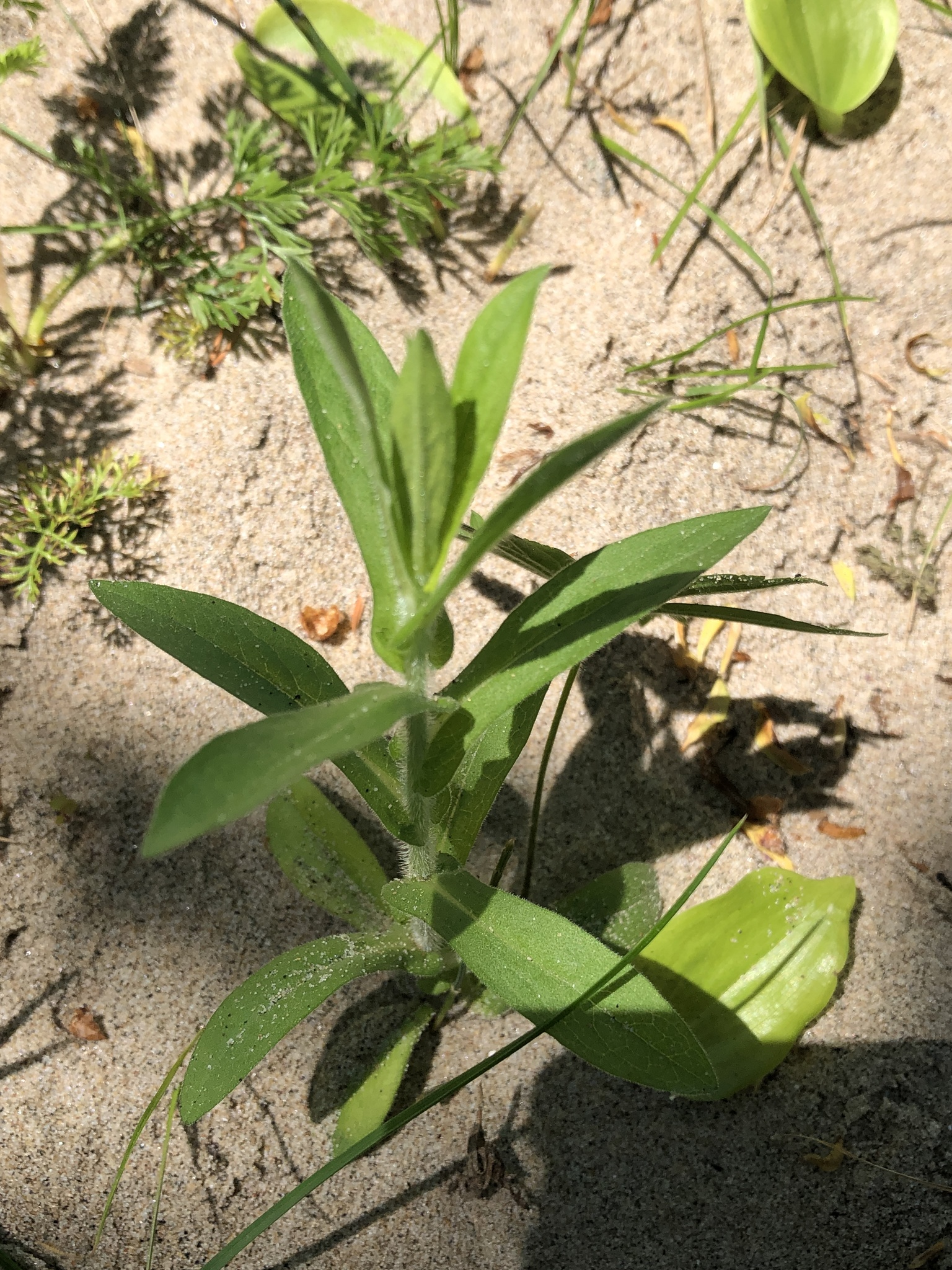
Juvenile plant growing in sand at Wasaga Beach, Ontario

=== Distribution ===
==== Native ====
New England aster is native to most of the central and northeastern United States and southeastern Canada, from Manitoba south to Louisiana and east to Maine. It is absent from much of the far southeastern United States and from boreal regions in North America. There are isolated populations to the west of the main range, such as in New Mexico and in the Black Hills of South Dakota.

==== Introduced ====
Due to widespread cultivation, introduced populations are present elsewhere in North America including in Montana, Oregon, Utah, Washington, and Wyoming. It was found in Nova Scotia and considered a possible escapee from cultivation, but as of July 2021, it is categorized as native there. It is considered ephemeral in British Columbia, with recorded sightings in 1993 and 1994 near Vancouver, probably originating from railroad cars and garden waste.

New England aster is widely naturalized throughout most of Europe, in parts of Central Asia, on the island of Hispaniola, and in the island country of New Zealand.

=== Habitat ===
S. novae-angliae is found in a wide variety of open, typically moist habitats, including meadows, prairies, marshes, fens, forest edges, and disturbed anthropogenic sites, such as roadsides and former agricultural fields. In its native habitat, it grows primarily in moist calcareous soils, favoring more marshy-wet sites in the western-most of its range.

It is categorized on the United States National Wetland Plant List (NWPL) with the Wetland indicator status rating of Facultative Wetland (FACW) in all wetland regions, meaning it usually occurs in wetlands, but not out of necessity. For example, in one northern location, the Niagara Peninsula in southern Ontario, it was found to grow in dry and sandy soils. It grows best in soils with a pH of 5–7.

== Ecology ==
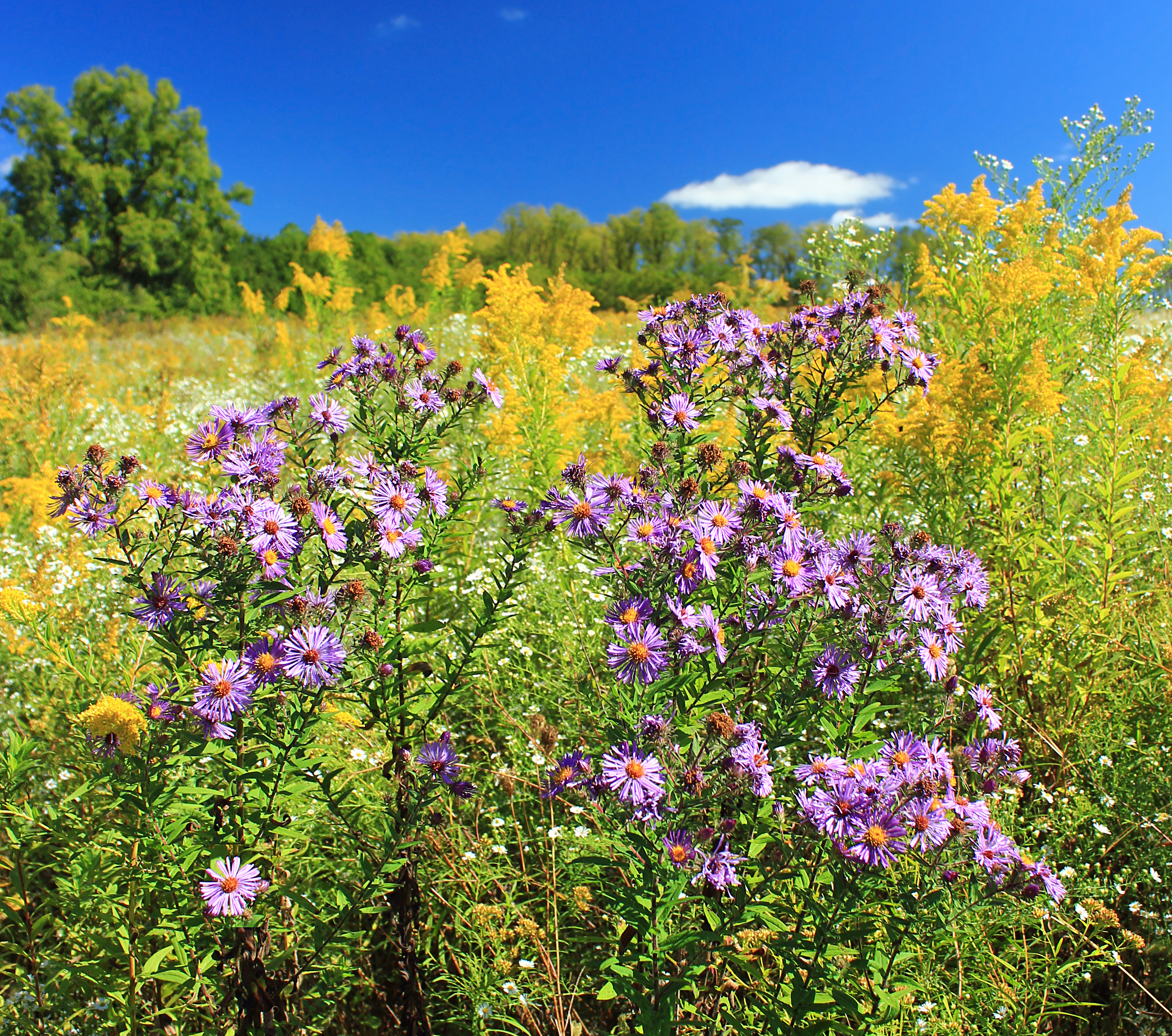
Flowering with goldenrod (Solidago)

Symphyotrichum novae-angliae has coefficients of conservatism (C-values) in the Floristic Quality Assessment (FQA) that range from 0 to 8 depending on evaluation region. The higher the C-value, the lower tolerance the species has for disturbance and the greater the likelihood that it is growing in a presettlement natural community. In the Dakotas, for example, S. novae-angliae has a C-value of 8, meaning its populations there are found in high-quality remnant natural areas with little environmental degradation but can tolerate some periodic disturbance. In contrast, for the Atlantic coastal pine barrens of Massachusetts, New York, and Rhode Island, it has been given a C-value of 1, meaning its presence in locations of that ecoregion provides little or no confidence of a remnant habitat.

=== Reproduction ===
Symphyotrichum novae-angliae reproduces sexually via wind-dispersed seeds and asexually (vegetatively) via short rhizomes. The species is largely incapable of self-pollination and requires cross-pollination for seed production. The ray florets of species in the Symphyotrichum genus are exclusively female, each having a pistil but no stamen, while disk florets are androgynous, each with both male and female reproductive parts. (Note: See Asteraceae § Inflorescences for more detail.)

=== Pollinators and food-seekers ===
The seeds of S. novae-angliae are an important fall and winter food source for songbirds. Further, a wide variety of generalist nectar-feeding insects visit the plant, including butterflies, moths, ants, flies, and bees. It is heavily visited by long-tongued bumblebees, including the golden northern bumble bee (Bombus fervidus) and the half-black bumblebee (Bombus vagans), and less so by short-tongued species. Some bees will collect pollen in addition to nectar, such as the broad-handed leafcutter bee (Megachile latimanus) and Drury's long-horned bee (Melissodes druriellus). (Note: As Melissodes druriella in Wilhelm & Rericha)

=== Pests and diseases ===
==== Insects ====
A gall midge insect, Rhopalomyia astericaulis, produces a 2 cm stem gall on this species. Leaf-mining insects include beetles (Sumitrosis inaequalis, Systena hudsonias, and Microrhopala xerene) and flies (Agromyza curvipalpis, Agromyza platypera, Napomyza lateralis, and Phytomyza albiceps). A butterfly known to feed on New England aster as a caterpillar is the Gorgone checkerspot (Chlosyne gorgone). The warty leaf beetle Exema canadensis breeds on S. novae-angliae.

==== Fungi ====
Fungi known to affect the species include the mildews Basidiophora entospora (downy) and Golovinomyces asterum (powdery), and a black knot fungus Gibberidea heliopsidis. Leaf spot fungi include Discosphaerina pseudhimantia and Placosphaeria haydeni (both making black spots), as well as Ramularia asteris, R. macrospora, and Septoria atropurpurea, the latter making purple stains. Two rusts have been recorded on S. novae-angliae: the brown rust Puccinia asteris and the red rust Coleosporium asterum.

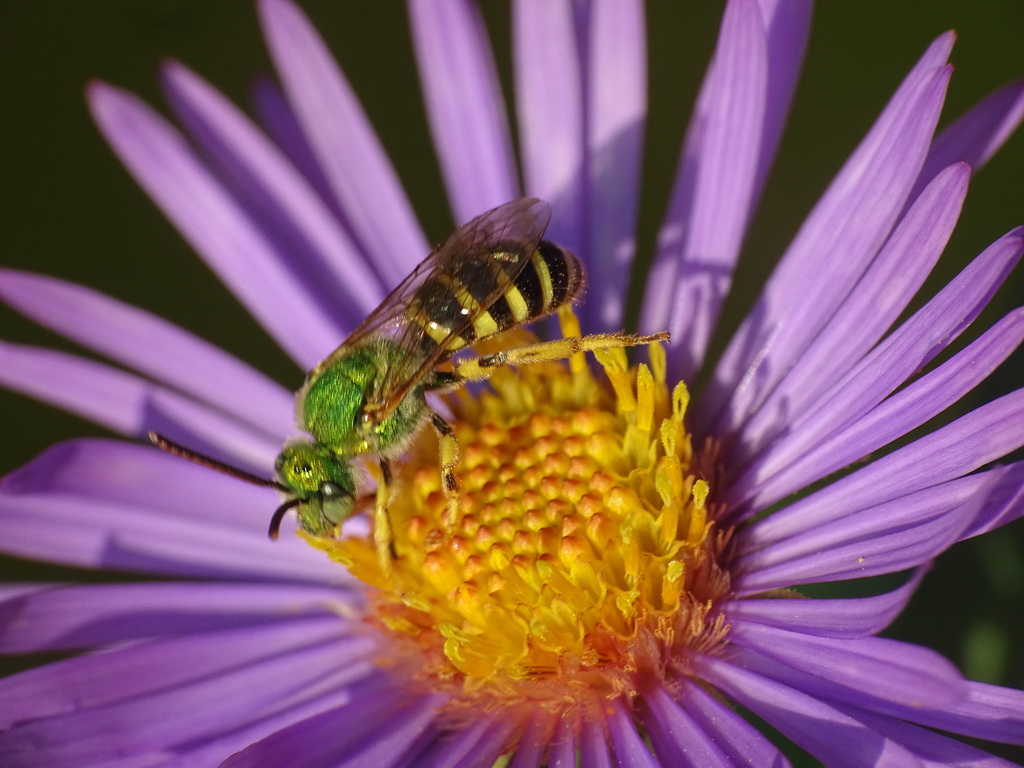
A bee of the Agapostemon genus on New England aster

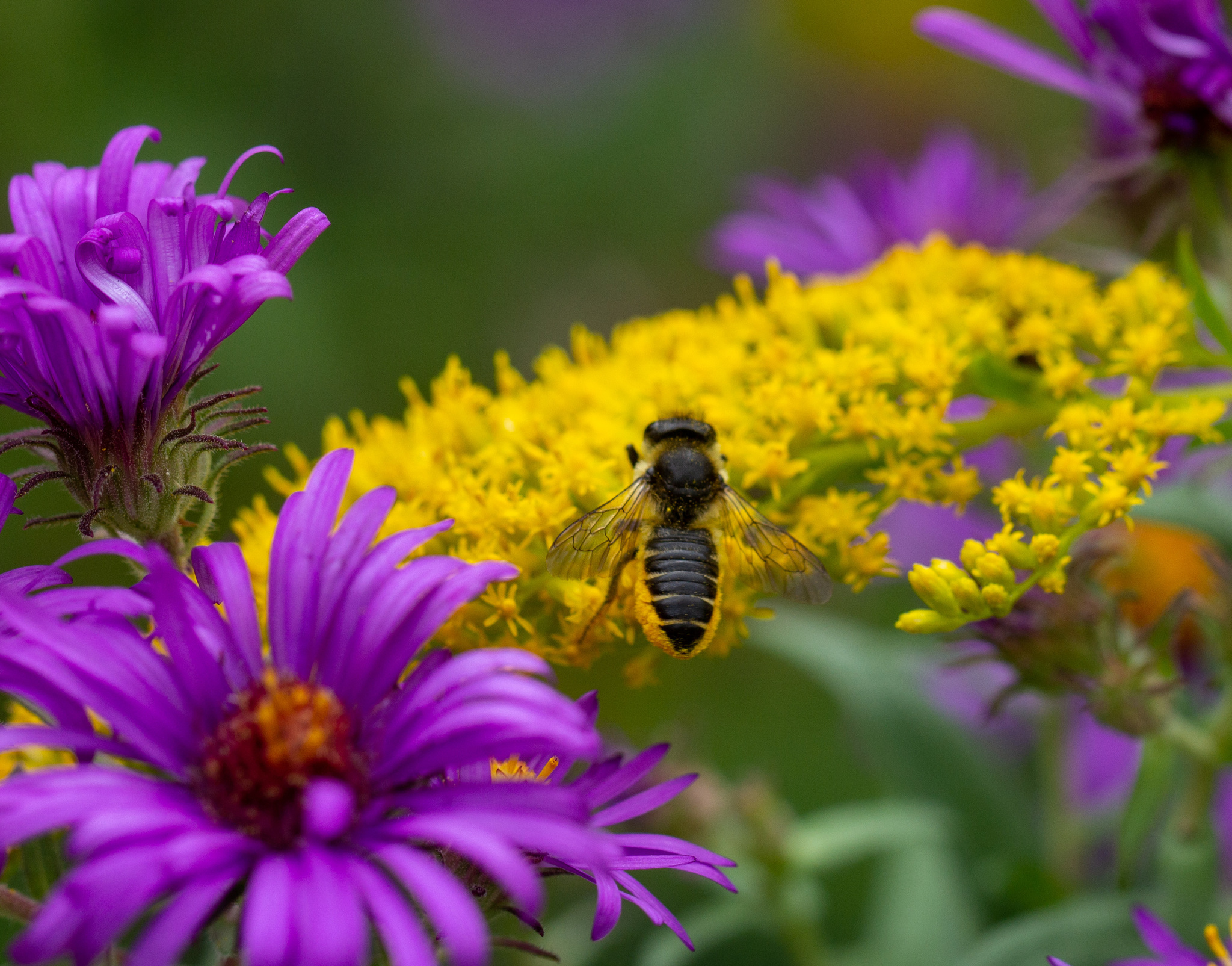
Megachile latimanus perusing S. novae-angliae and a Solidago species

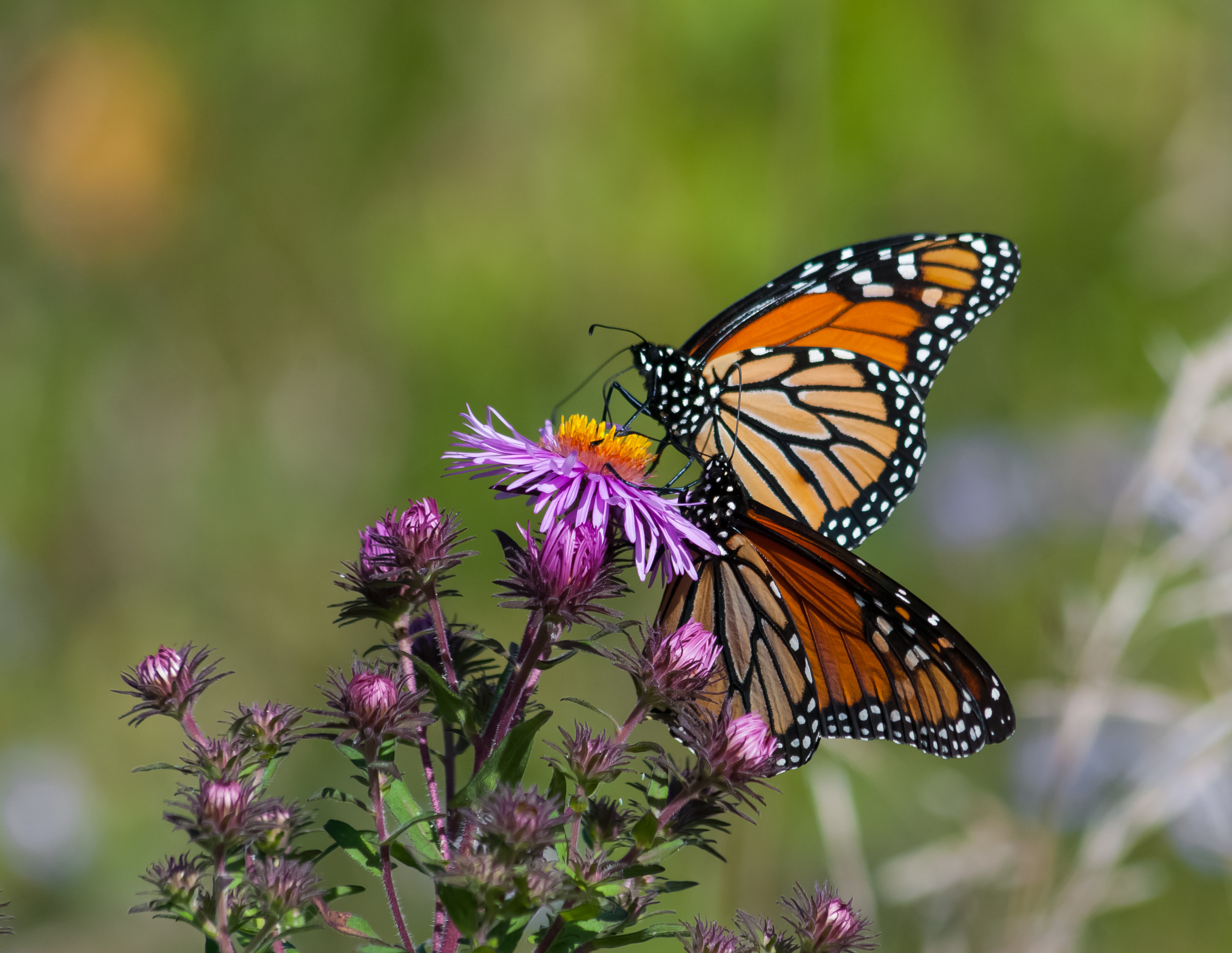
Monarch (Danaus plexippus) on New England aster

== Conservation ==
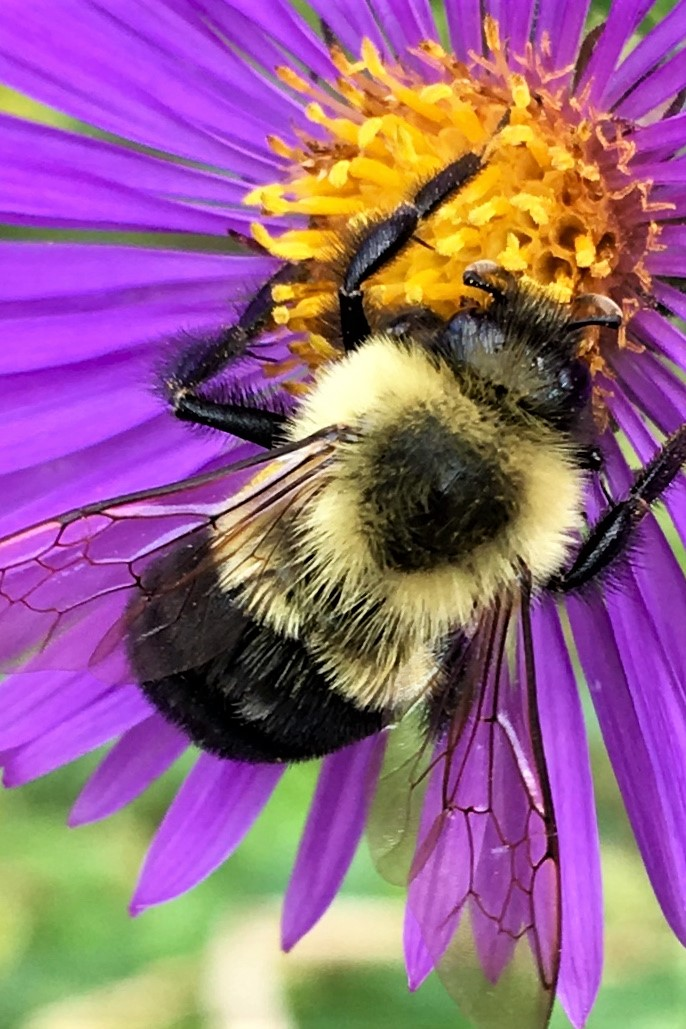
Common eastern bumble bee (Bombus impatiens) on a flower head

As of July 2021, NatureServe listed S. novae-angliae as Secure (G5) worldwide. This status was last reviewed on 13 May 2016. In individual provinces and states, it is listed as Possibly Extirpated (SX) in Oklahoma; Critically Imperiled (S1) in Saskatchewan, Georgia, South Carolina, and Wyoming; Imperiled (S2) in Colorado; and, Vulnerable (S3) in North Carolina.

== Uses ==
=== Medicinal ===
Symphyotrichum novae-angliae has been used for various medicinal purposes. In his 1828 Medical Flora, French botanist Constantine Samuel Rafinesque wrote the following about its use to treat skin eruptions, including urushiol-induced contact dermatitis from poison ivy and poison sumac:

The A. novanglia is employed in decoction internally, with a strong decoction externally, in many eruptive diseases of the skin: it removes also the poisonous state of the skin caused by Rhus or Shumac. (Note: At the time of the writing of Rafinesque's Medical Flora, the North American species Toxicodendron radicans (eastern poison ivy) was classified in the genus Rhus.)

Among Indigenous peoples of North America, it has been documented that the Cherokee have made a poultice of the roots for pain, an infusion of the roots for diarrhea, an infusion of the plant for fever, and have sniffed the ooze from the roots for catarrh.

Both the Meskwaki and the Potawatomi have used the plant to revive people: the Meskwaki by smudging, and the Potawatomi through fumigation. The Haudenosaunee have made a decoction of the plant for weak skin and of the roots and leaves for fevers. They have used the plant as a love medicine. The Mohawk people and other Haudenosaunee have used an infusion of the whole plant in combination with rhizomes from another plant to treat mothers with intestinal fevers. The Ojibwe have smoked the root in pipes to attract game.

=== Gardening ===
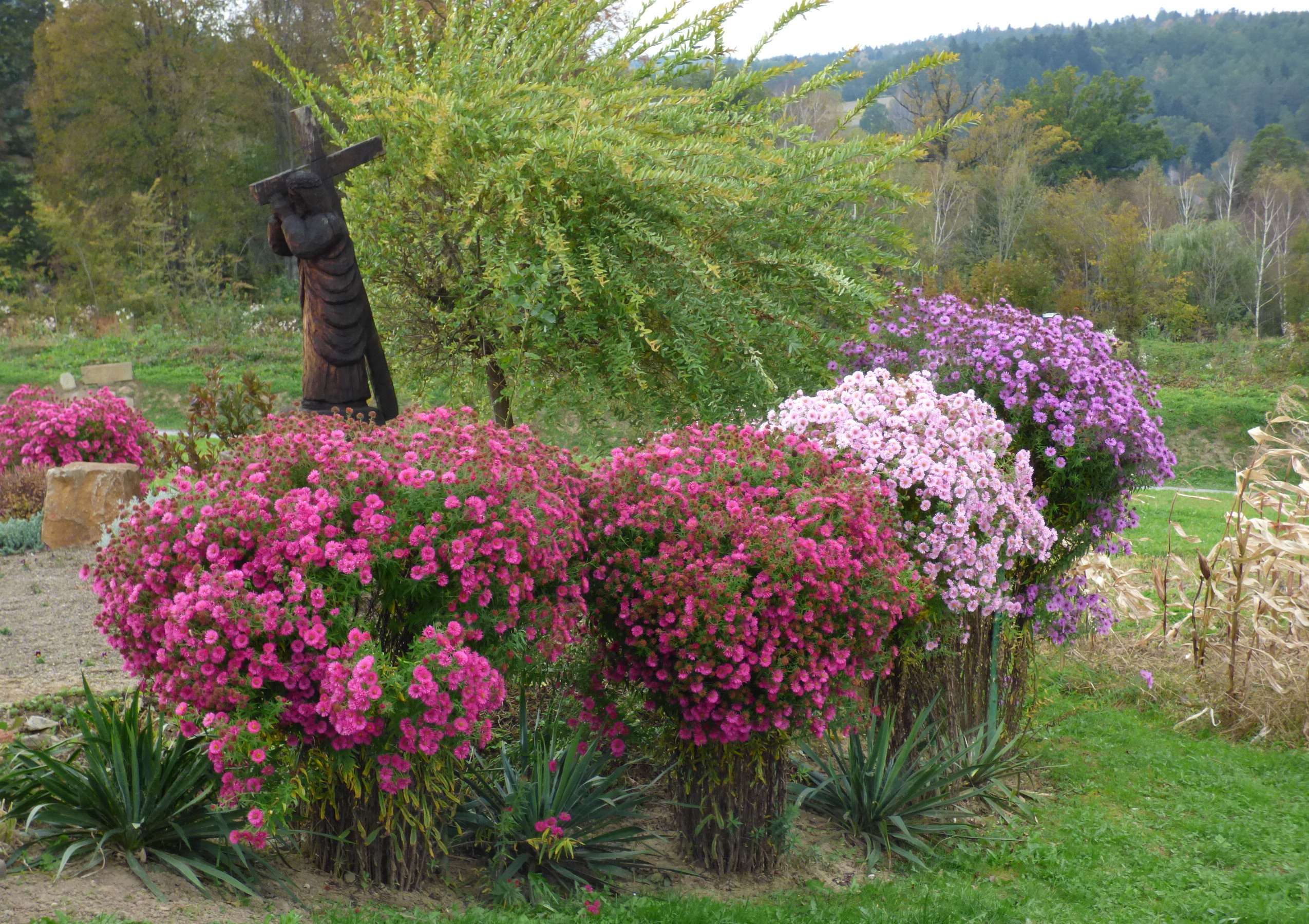
Several cultivars of New England aster

Over 70 cultivars have been developed, and about 50 were in commerce as of 2019. The S. novae-angliae cultivars grow to between 90 and 200 centimeters (3 and 6 1/2 feet) in height, with the notable exception of 'Purple Dome', at 45 cm (1 1/2 ft). Long popular in Europe where it was introduced into cultivation in 1710, New England aster has only more recently become commonly cultivated in North America.

Twelve cultivars have received the Royal Horticultural Society's Award of Garden Merit (AGM) as of December 2020, including 'Brunswick' (bright pink), 'Helen Picton' (purple), 'James Ritchie' (deep pink), and 'Rosa Sieger' (rose-pink).
