= List of Symphyotrichum novae-angliae cultivars =

About fifty Symphyotrichum novae-angliae cultivars were in commerce as of 2019. With few exceptions, these New England aster cultivars grow to between 90 and 180 centimetres (3 and 6 feet) in height and flower September–October. As of December 2020, twelve had won the Royal Horticultural Society's Award of Garden Merit (AGM).

== List of cultivars ==
Flower size, colour, approximate maximum height, image, and other details for each cultivar of Symphyotrichum novae-angliae, when available, are given in the list that follows.

New England aster cultivars
| Name | Flower size | Colour | Max. (cm) | Max. (ft/in) | Notes | Image |
|---|---|---|---|---|---|---|
| 'Alex Deamon' | medium | pale purple | 90 cm | 3 ft | | |
| 'Anabelle de Chazal' | medium | pale rose | 100 cm | 3 ft 3 in | | |
| 'Andenken an Alma Pötschke' | medium | cerise-pink | 90 cm | 3 ft | compact | 'Andenken an Alma Pötschke' |
| 'Andenken an Paul Gerber' | large | deep purple-pink | 150 cm | 5 ft | AGM winner | |
| 'Augusta' | large | lilac-blue | 90 cm | 3 ft | compact | |
| 'Badsey Pink' | large | sugar pink | 120 cm | 4 ft | AGM winner | |
| 'Barr's Blue' | medium | purple-blue | 120 cm | 4 ft | | |
| 'Barr's Pink' | large | lilac-pink | 150 cm | 5 ft | | 'Barr's Pink' |
| 'Barr's Purple' | medium | lilac-purple | 120 cm | 4 ft | AGM winner | |
| 'Barr's Violet' | medium | violet-blue | 120 cm | 4 ft | | |
| 'Brunswick' | medium | purple-pink | 80 cm | 2 ft 7 in | AGM winner, compact | |
| 'Christopher Harbutt' | large | purple-blue | 100 cm | 3 ft 3 in | | |
| 'Colwall Century' | medium | purple-pink | 140 cm | 4 ft 7 in | AGM winner | |
| 'Colwall Constellation' | medium | pale purple | 150 cm | 5 ft | | |
| 'Colwall Galaxy' | medium | purple-pink | 130 cm | 4 ft 3 in | | |
| 'Colwall Orbit' | small | cerise-pink | 90 cm | 3 ft | rounded heads | |
| 'Colwall Satellite' | medium | violet | 140 cm | 4 ft 7 in | | |
| 'Crimson Beauty' | medium | purple-red | 140 cm | 4 ft 7 in | | |
| 'Evensong' | medium | violet-purple | 120 cm | 4 ft | | |
| 'Foxy Emily' | large | pink | 120 cm | 4 ft | | |
| 'Harrington's Pink' | medium | pale rose-pink | 150 cm | 5 ft | | 'Harrington's Pink' |
| 'Helen Picton' | large | violet-purple | 120 cm | 4 ft | AGM winner, mildew resistant | |
| 'Herbstschnee' (syn. 'Autumn Snow') | medium | white | 120 cm | 4 ft | mildew resistant | |
| 'James' | large | light purple | 130 cm | 4 ft 3 in | AGM winner | |
| 'James Ritchie' | medium | purple-red | 90 cm | 3 ft | AGM winner, compact | |
| 'John Davis' | medium | lilac-pink | 130 cm | 4 ft 3 in | AGM winner | |
| 'Kate Deamon' | large | pink | 120 cm | 4 ft | | |
| 'Lachsglut' | medium | purple-pink | 120 cm | 4 ft | AGM winner | 'Lachsglut' |
| 'Ladies Day' | large | pink | 130 cm | 4 ft 3 in | | |
| 'Little Bella' | medium | rose-pink | 80 cm | 2 ft 7 in | mildew resistant | |
| 'Lou Williams' | large | purple-red | 180 cm | 5 ft 10 in | strong stems | |
| 'Lucida' | medium | purple-red | 140 cm | 4 ft 7 in | strong growth | |
| 'Lye End Beauty' | medium | purple-pink | 140 cm | 4 ft 7 in | | 'Lye End Beauty' |
| 'Lye End Companion' | medium | purple-blue | 140 cm | 4 ft 7 in | | |
| 'Marina Wolkonsky' | medium | deep violet-blue | 120 cm | 4 ft | | 'Marina Wolkonsky' |
| 'Millennium Star' | medium | rose-pink | 100 cm | 3 ft 3 in | | |
| 'Miss K. E. Mash' | medium | pale pink | 140 cm | 4 ft 7 in | | |
| 'Mrs S. T. Wright' | large | lilac-blue | 150 cm | 5 ft | | |
| 'Mrs S. W. Stern' | large | pale violet | 120 cm | 4 ft | | |
| 'Naomi' | medium | pale pink | 120 cm | 4 ft | | |
| 'Pink Parfait' | large | rose-pink | 120 cm | 4 ft | | |
| 'Primrose Upward' | medium | pale purple-red | 140 cm | 4 ft 7 in | | |
| 'Purple Cloud' | large | purple-blue | 180 cm | 5 ft 10 in | needs support in rain | |
| 'Purple Dome' | medium | violet-purple | 60 cm | 2 ft | shortest | |
| 'Quinton Menzies' | medium | deep purple-pink | 140 cm | 4 ft 7 in | AGM winner | |
| 'Red Cloud' | medium | pale purple-pink | 150 cm | 5 ft | | |
| 'Rosa Sieger' | large | rose-pink | 120 cm | 4 ft | AGM winner | |
| 'Rose Williams' | small | purple-pink | 120 cm | 4 ft | | |
| 'Roterstern' | medium | purple-pink | 130 cm | 4 ft 3 in | | |
| 'Rubinschatz' | medium | deep purple-pink | 130 cm | 4 ft 3 in | | 'Rubinschatz' |
| 'Sayer's Croft' | large | purple-pink | 130 cm | 4 ft 3 in | | |
| 'Septemberrubin' (syn. 'September Ruby') | large | deep purple-red | 130 cm | 4 ft 3 in | | 'September Ruby' |
| 'St. Michael's' | large | deep purple-blue | 120 cm | 4 ft | | |
| 'Treasure' | large | pale violet | 140 cm | 4 ft 7 in | | |
| 'Violetta' | small | deep violet-purple | 150 cm | 5 ft | | |
| 'W Bowman' | large | violet-purple | 150 cm | 5 ft | | |
