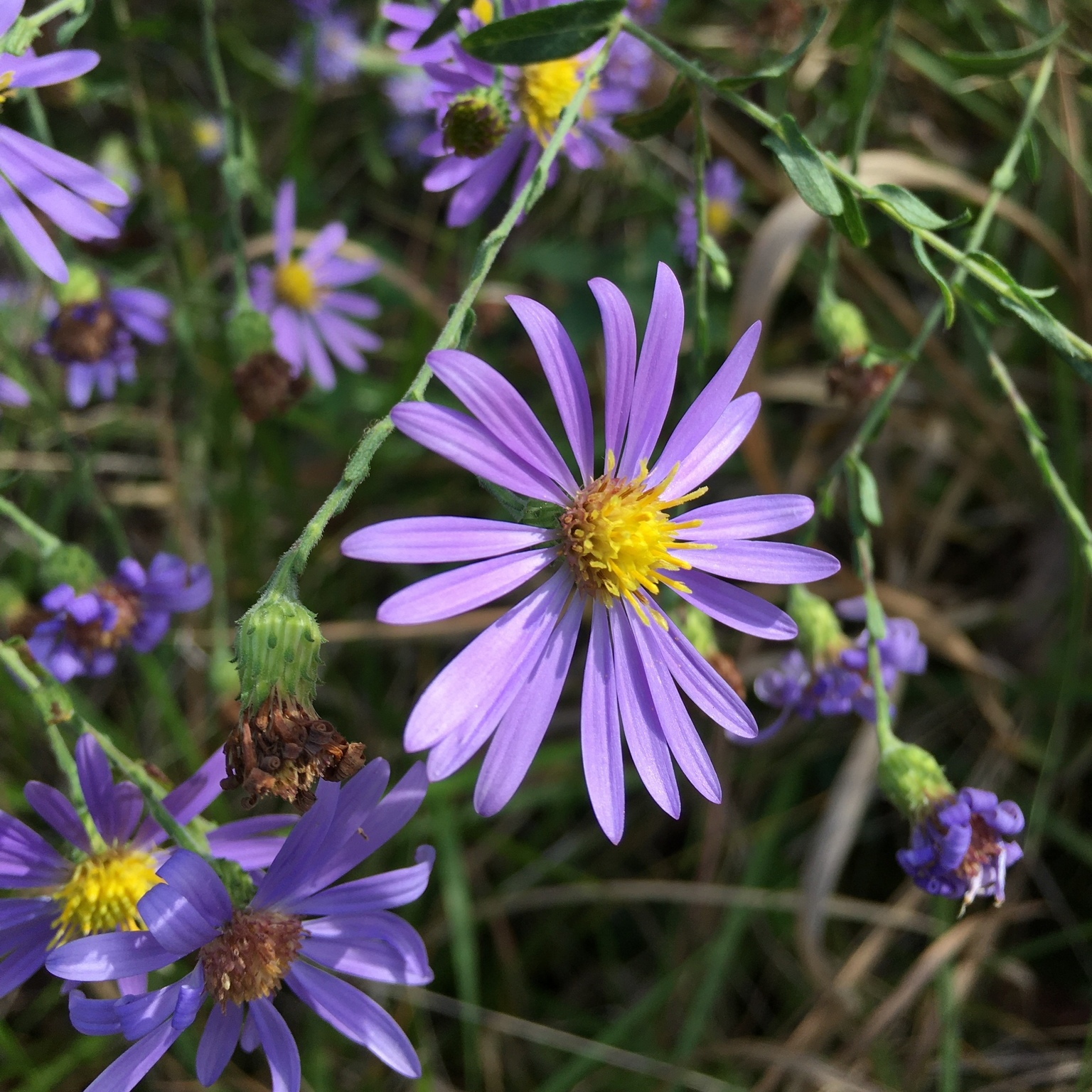
- In Polkton, North Carolina

Conservation status
- Secure (NatureServe)

Scientific classification
- Kingdom: Plantae
- Clade: Tracheophytes
- Clade: Angiosperms
- Clade: Eudicots
- Clade: Asterids
- Order: Asterales
- Family: Asteraceae
- Genus: Symphyotrichum
- Subgenus: Symphyotrichum subg. Virgulus
- Section: Symphyotrichum sect. Patentes
- Species: S. patens

Binomial name
- Symphyotrichum patens (Aiton) G.L.Nesom

Varieties
- List: S. patens var. patens; S. patens var. gracile (Hook.) G.L.Nesom; S. patens var. patentissimum (Lindl.) G.L.Nesom; S. patens var. terranigrum J.J.N.Campb. & W.R.Seymour
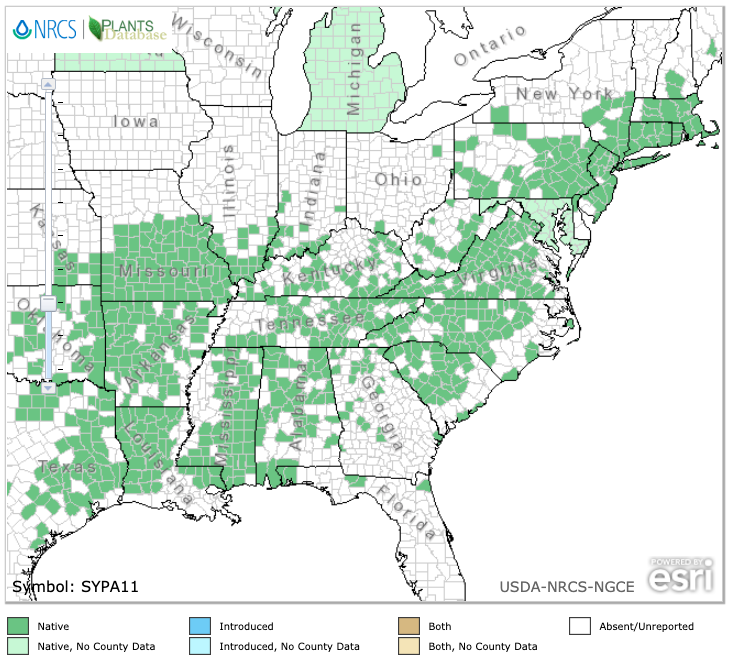
- County-level distribution map of Symphyotrichum patens

Synonyms
- Basionym: Aster patens Aiton; Alphabetical list: Aster alatus Aikin; Aster amplexicaulis Michx.; Aster auritus Lindl.; Aster phlogifolius var. patens (Aiton) Alph.Wood; Aster undulatus Elliott; Aster undulatus var. amplexicaulis (Michx.) W.P.C.Barton; Aster virgatus Elliott; Lasallea patens (Aiton) Semple & Brouillet; Virgulus patens (Aiton) Reveal & Keener

= Symphyotrichum patens =

Species of plant in the aster family

Symphyotrichum patens, commonly known as late purple aster or spreading aster, is a perennial, herbaceous plant found in the eastern United States.

== Description ==
Sympyotrichum patens is a perennial and herbaceous flowering plant usually between 10 and 100 centimeters (1/4 and 3 1/4 feet) tall. It has a spreading growth form, and the leaves are ovate to oblong and clasp the pubescent stem. The flowers are relatively small, less than 3 centimeters (1 1/4 inches) in diameter, with light blue to violet ray florets and yellow disk florets. It flowers between August and October.

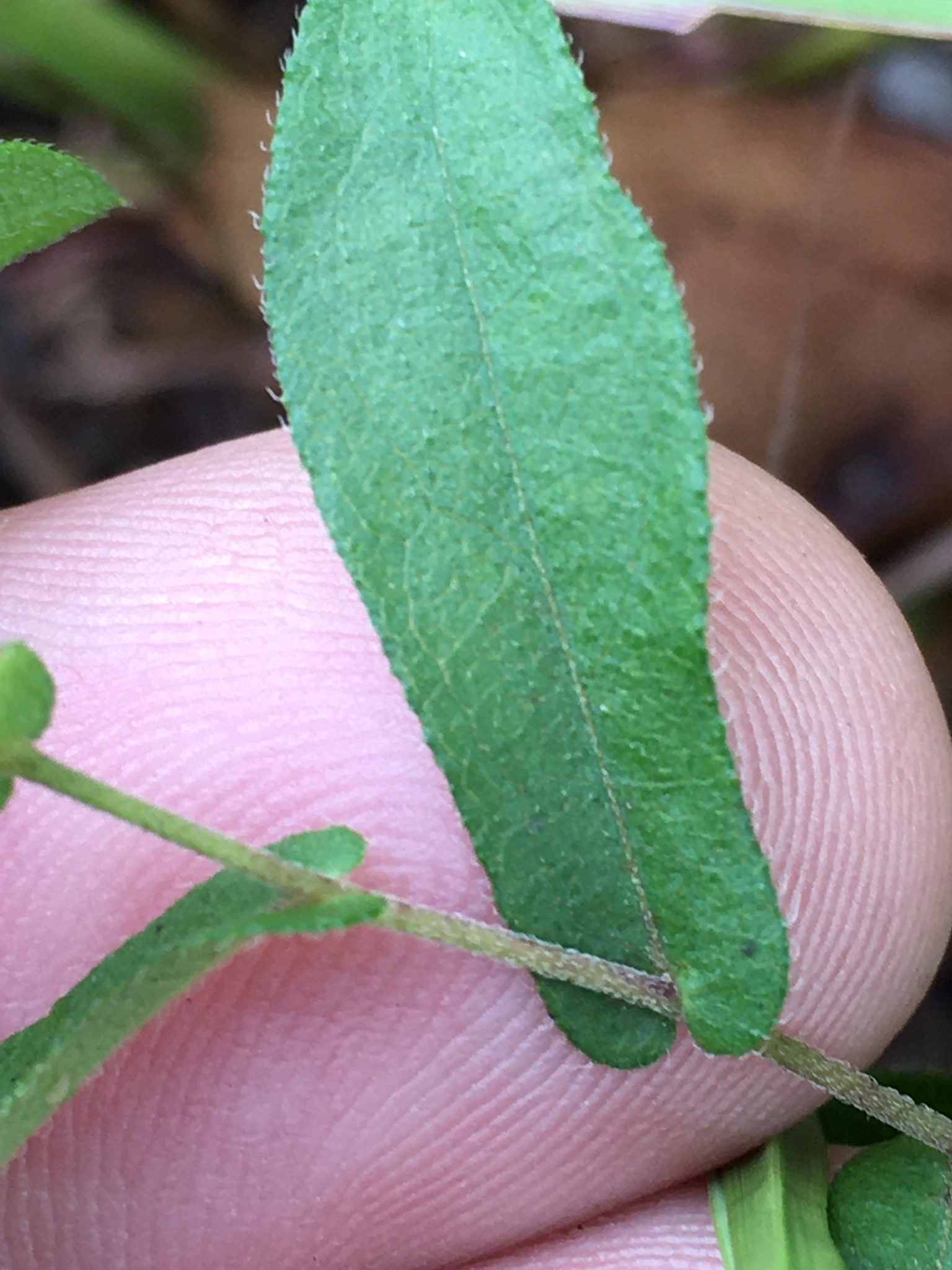
Leaf front

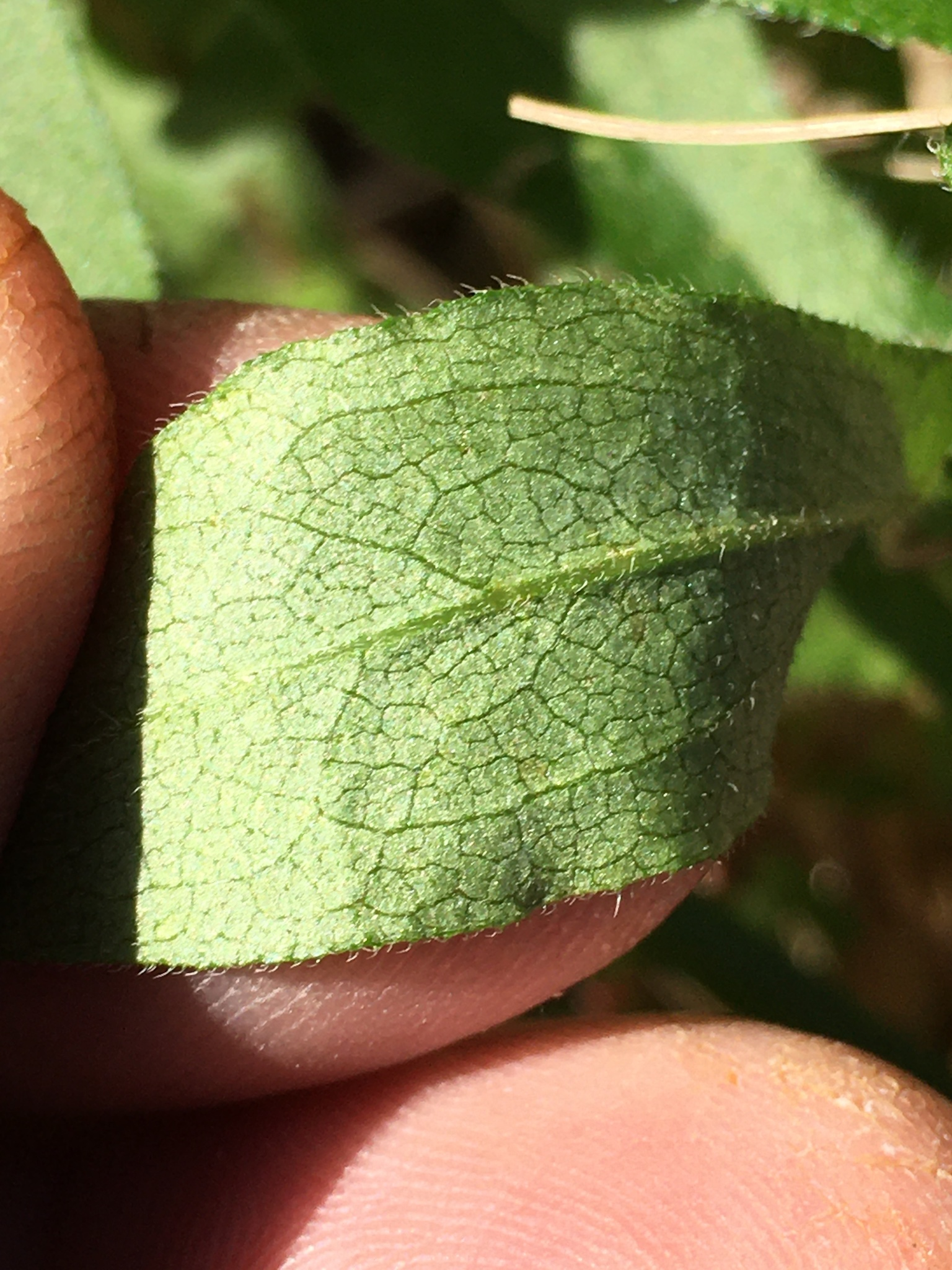
Leaf back

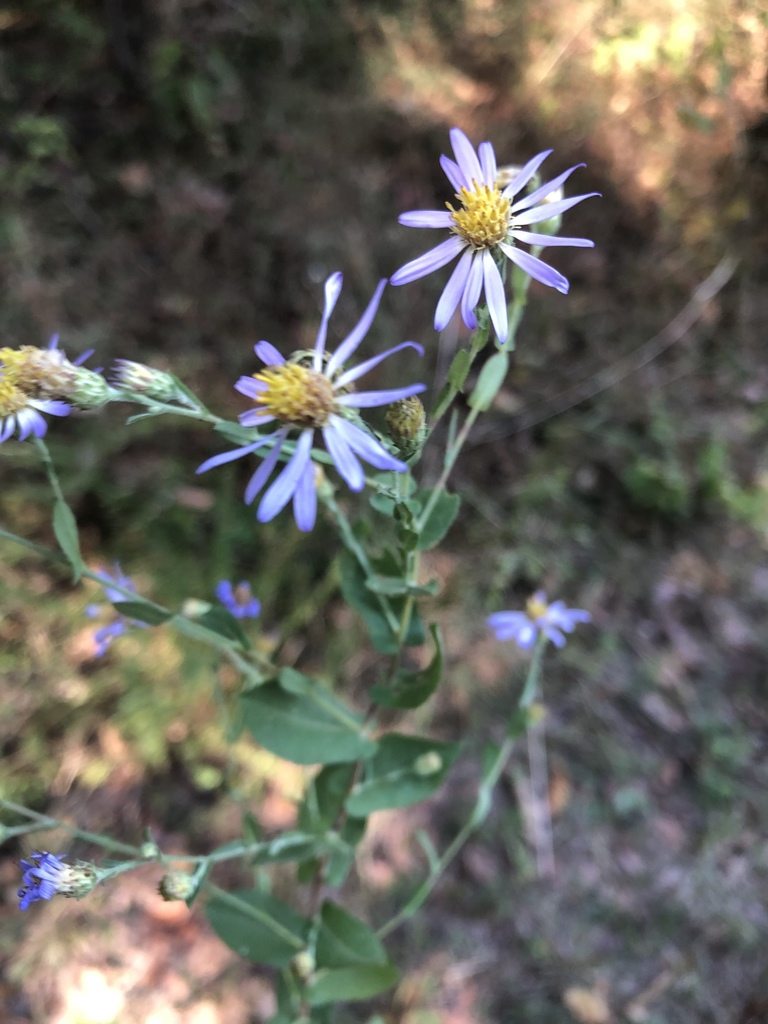
Inflorescence

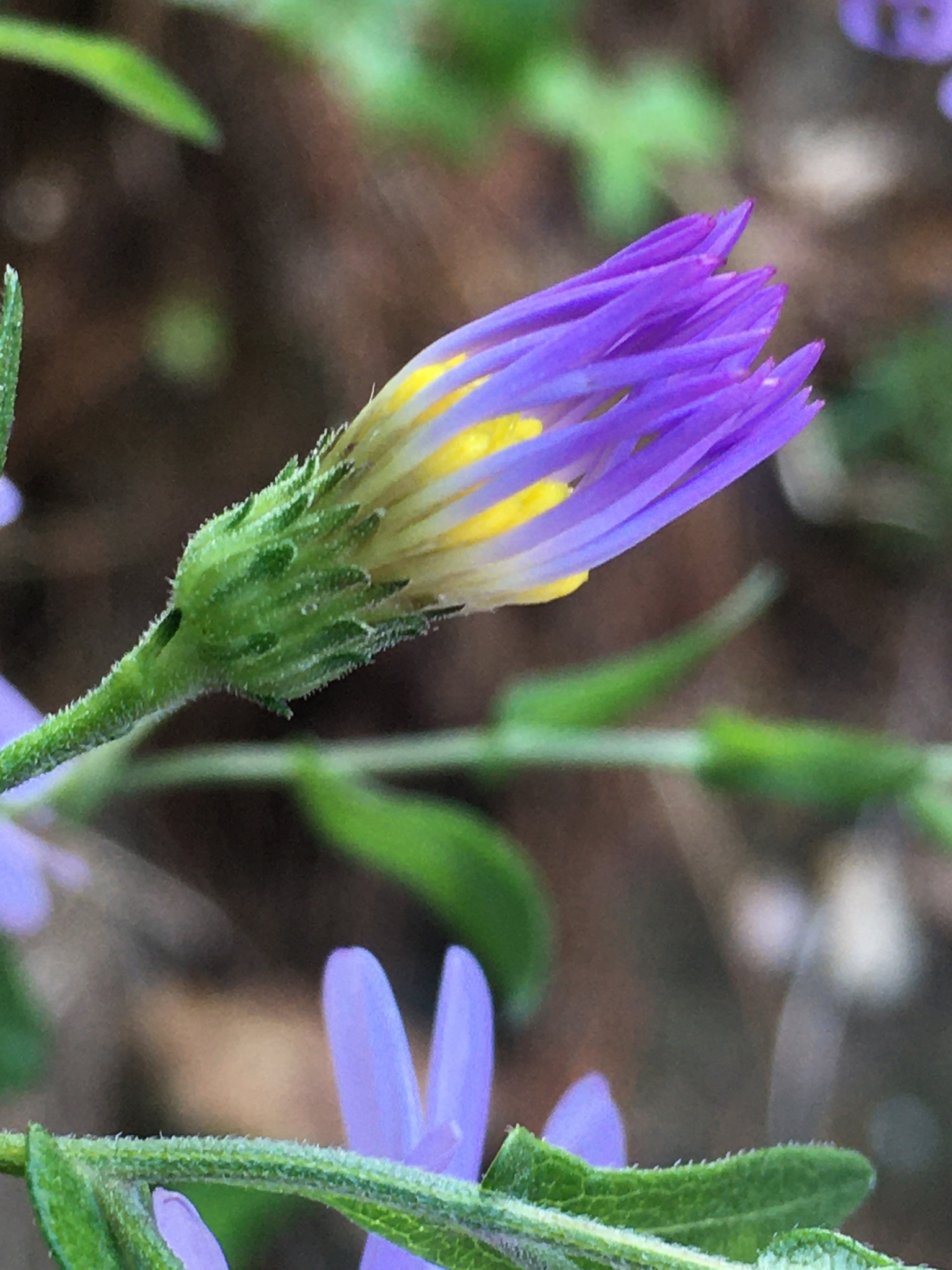
Involucre

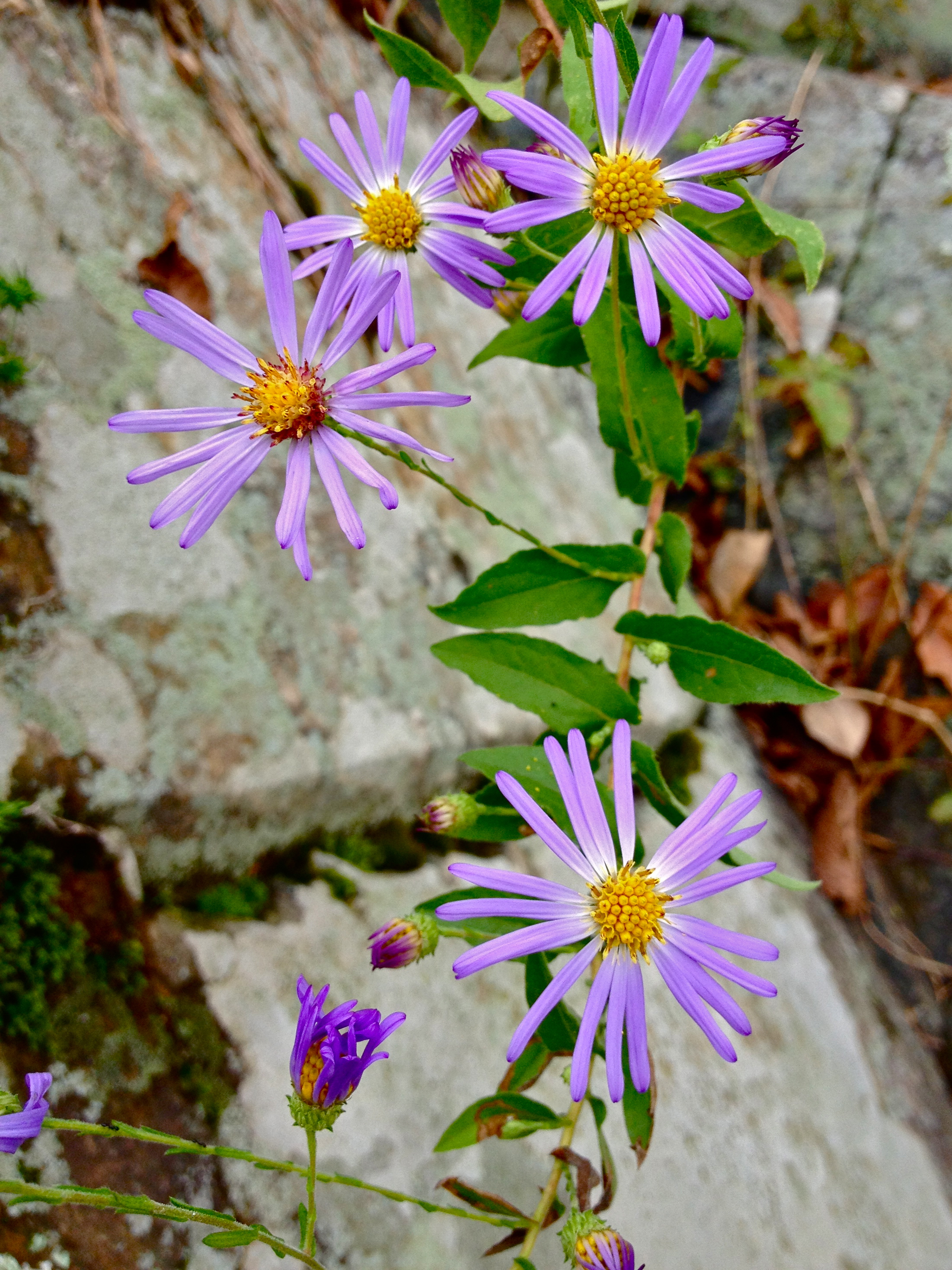
Flower heads

== Taxonomy ==
The title of a review of the Symphyotrichum patens complex begins with "Another review..." as a nod to the complexity of the topic. The species was first formally described and named Aster patens by Swedish botanist Jonas Carlsson Dryander and published by Scottish botanist William Aiton in 1789. It was transferred to the genus Symphyotrichum in 1995 by American botanist Guy L. Nesom. It is closely related to Symphyotrichum georgianum and Symphyotrichum phlogifolium.

Several varieties have been named, with the basionym as Symphyotrichum patens var. patens:

- Symphyotrichum patens var. gracile (Hook.) G.L.Nesom
- Symphyotrichum patens var. patentissimum (Lindl.) G.L.Nesom
- Symphyotrichum patens var. terranigrum J.J.N.Campb. & W.R.Seymour

== Distribution and habitat ==
A widely distributed species, S. patens ranges from southern Maine, south and west to eastern Texas. Plants are typically found in sunny to mostly sunny sites, including open woodlands.

== Conservation ==
As of July 2021, NatureServe listed Symphyotrichum patens as Secure (G5) worldwide and Possibly Extirpated (SX) in Maine.
