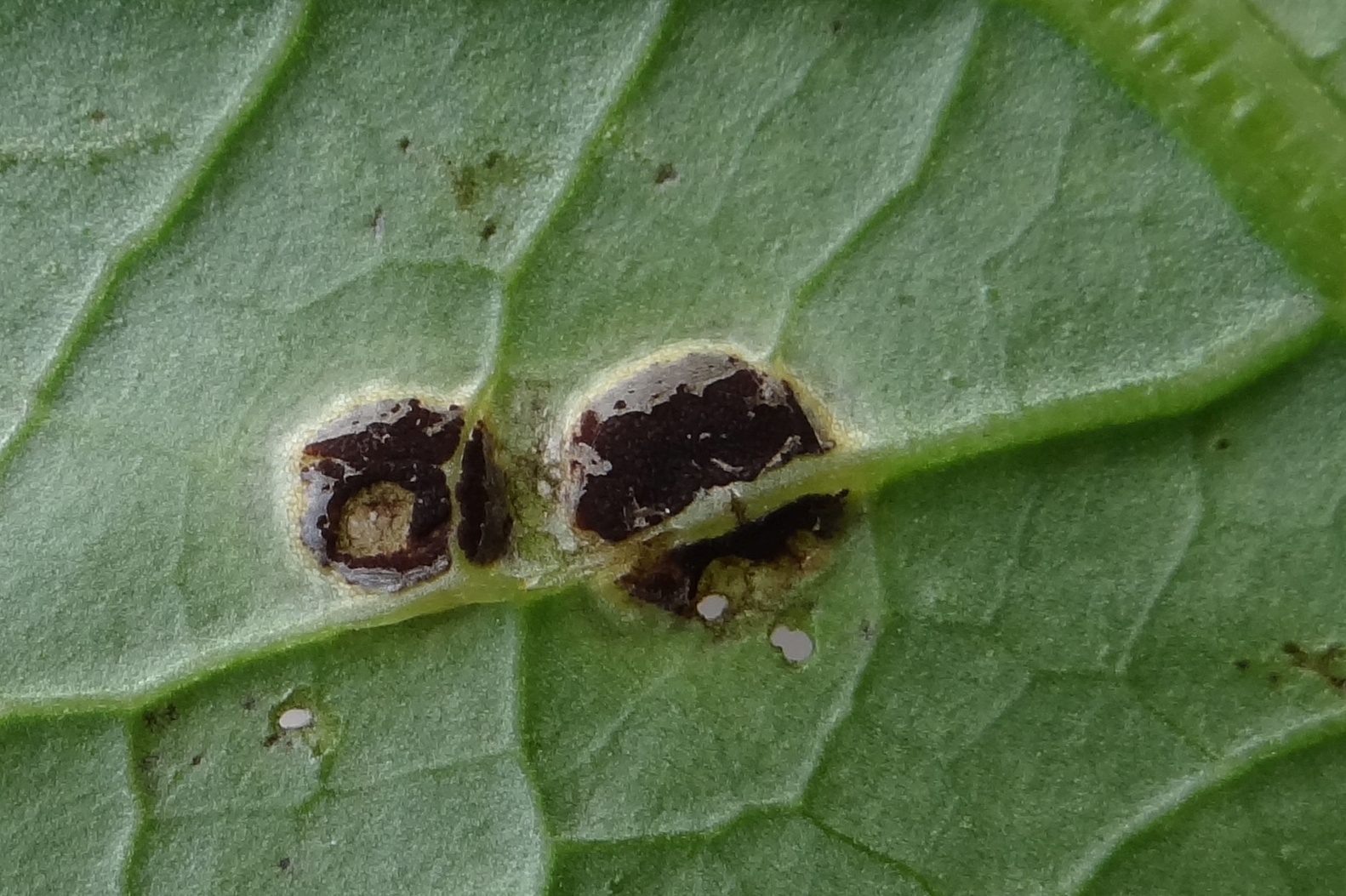

Scientific classification
- Domain: Eukaryota
- Kingdom: Fungi
- Division: Basidiomycota
- Class: Pucciniomycetes
- Order: Pucciniales
- Family: Pucciniaceae
- Genus: Puccinia
- Species: P. cnici-oleracei

Binomial name
- Puccinia cnici-oleracei Pers. (1823)

= Puccinia cnici-oleracei =

Species of fungus

Puccinia cnici-oleracei is a plant pathogen that causes rust on species in the Asteraceae family.

== See also ==
- List of Puccinia species
