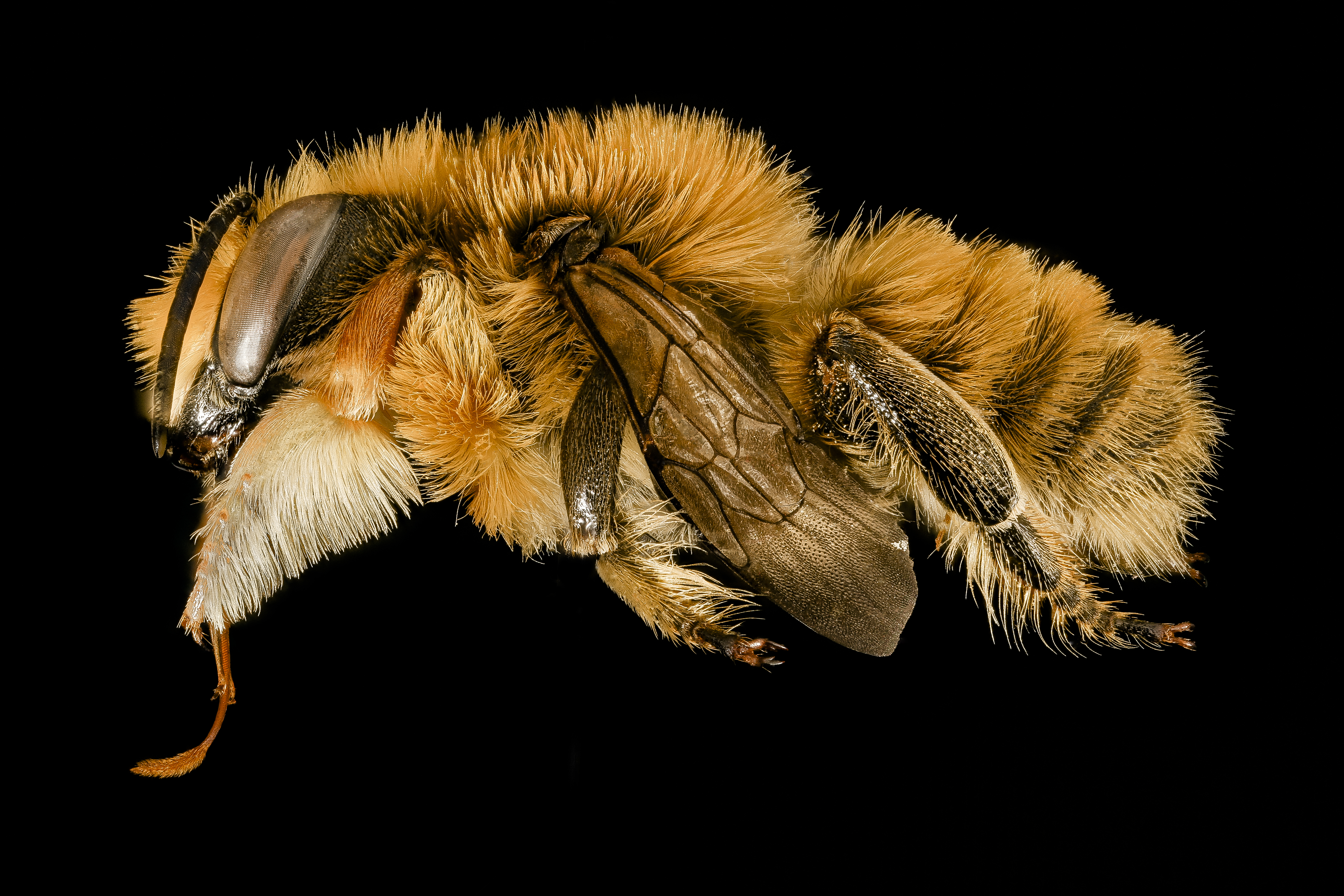

Scientific classification
- Domain: Eukaryota
- Kingdom: Animalia
- Phylum: Arthropoda
- Class: Insecta
- Order: Hymenoptera
- Family: Megachilidae
- Genus: Megachile
- Species: M. latimanus

Binomial name
- Megachile latimanus Say, 1823

= Megachile latimanus =

Species of leafcutter bee (Megachile)

Megachile latimanus, or the broad-handed leafcutter, is a species of bee in the family Megachilidae. It was described by Thomas Say in 1823.

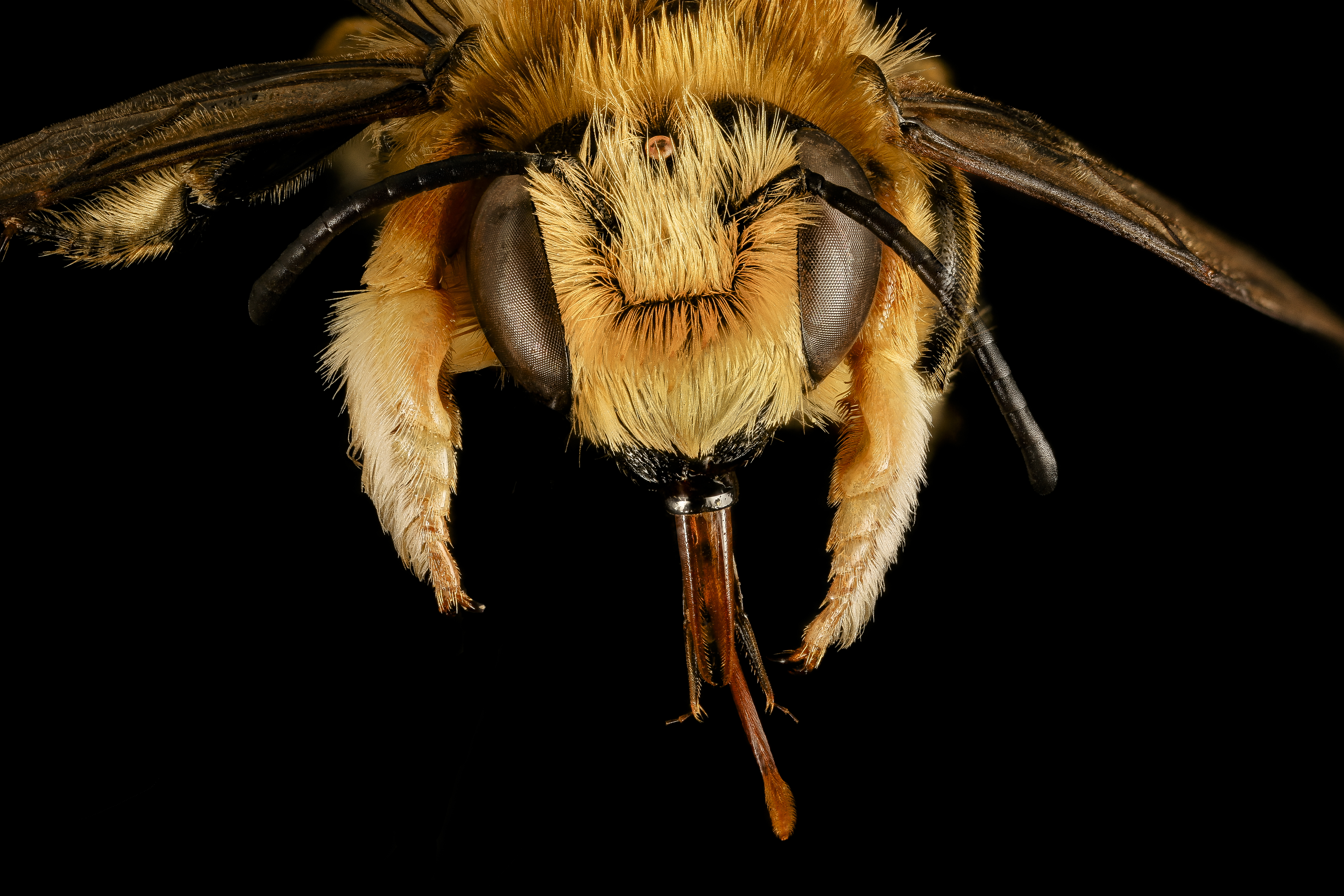
Megachile latimanus face
