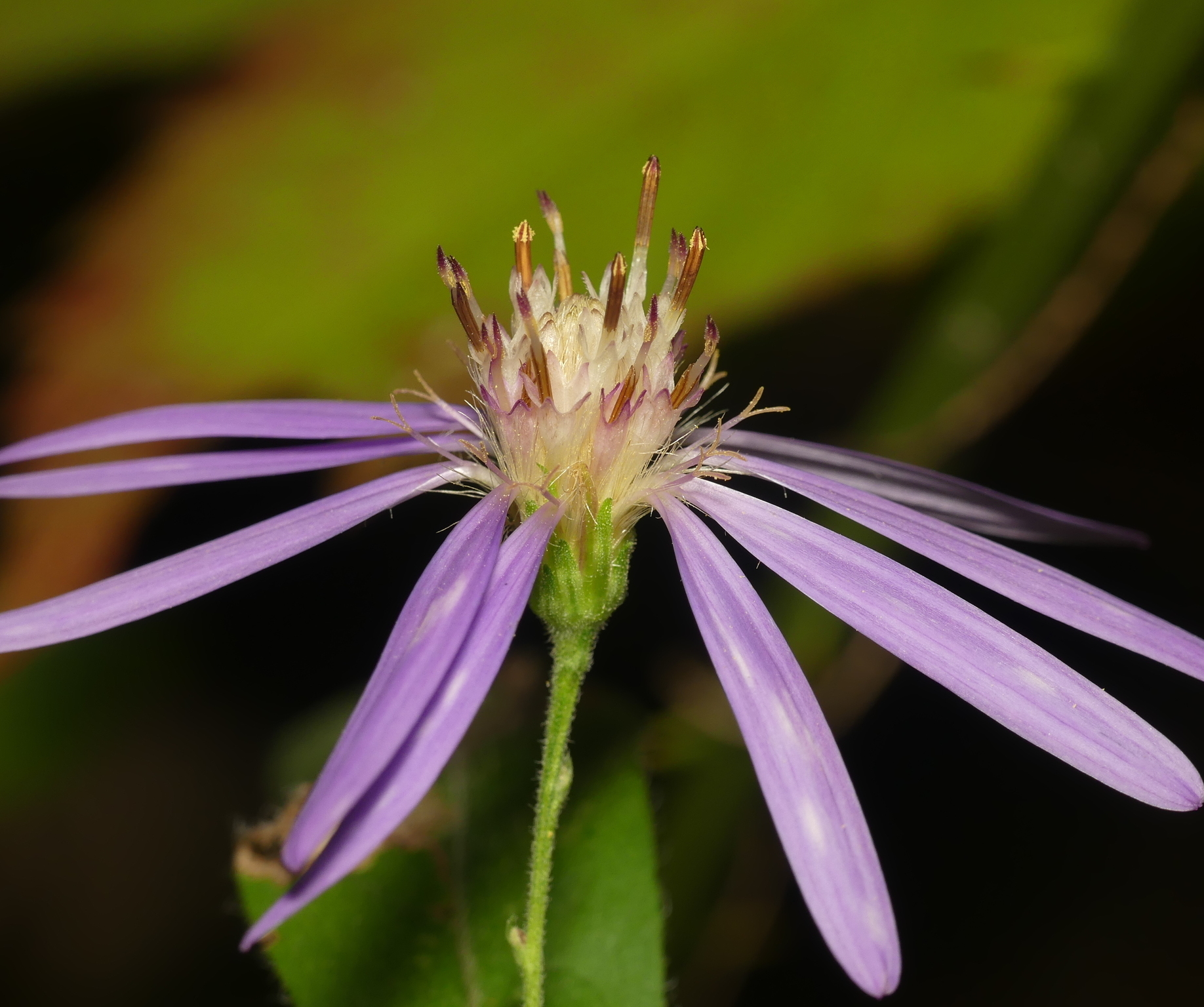

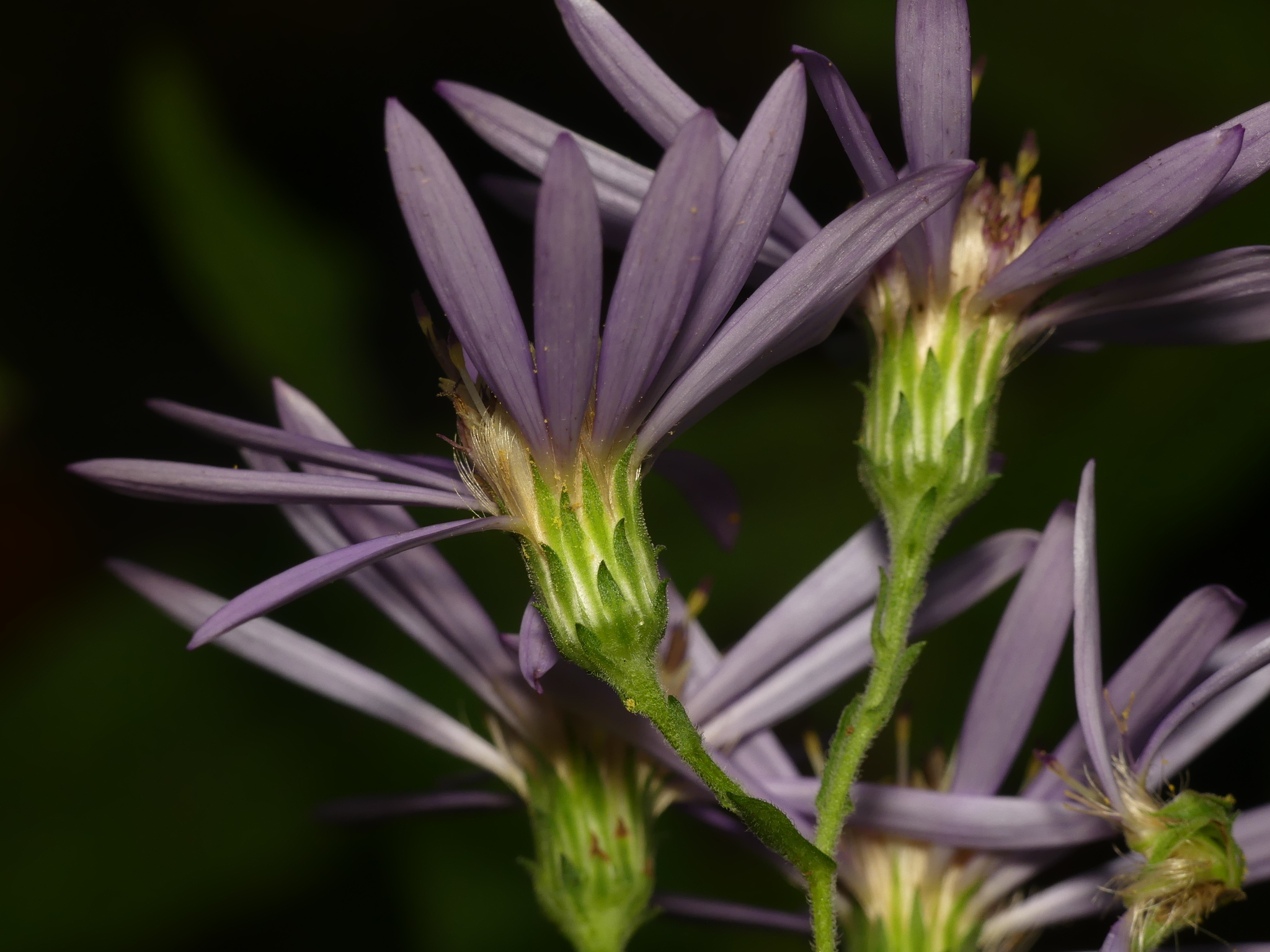

Conservation status
- Secure (NatureServe)

Scientific classification
- Kingdom: Plantae
- Clade: Tracheophytes
- Clade: Angiosperms
- Clade: Eudicots
- Clade: Asterids
- Order: Asterales
- Family: Asteraceae
- Tribe: Astereae
- Subtribe: Symphyotrichinae
- Genus: Symphyotrichum
- Subgenus: Symphyotrichum subg. Virgulus
- Section: Symphyotrichum sect. Patentes
- Species: S. phlogifolium

Binomial name
- Symphyotrichum phlogifolium (Muhl. ex Willd.) G.L.Nesom
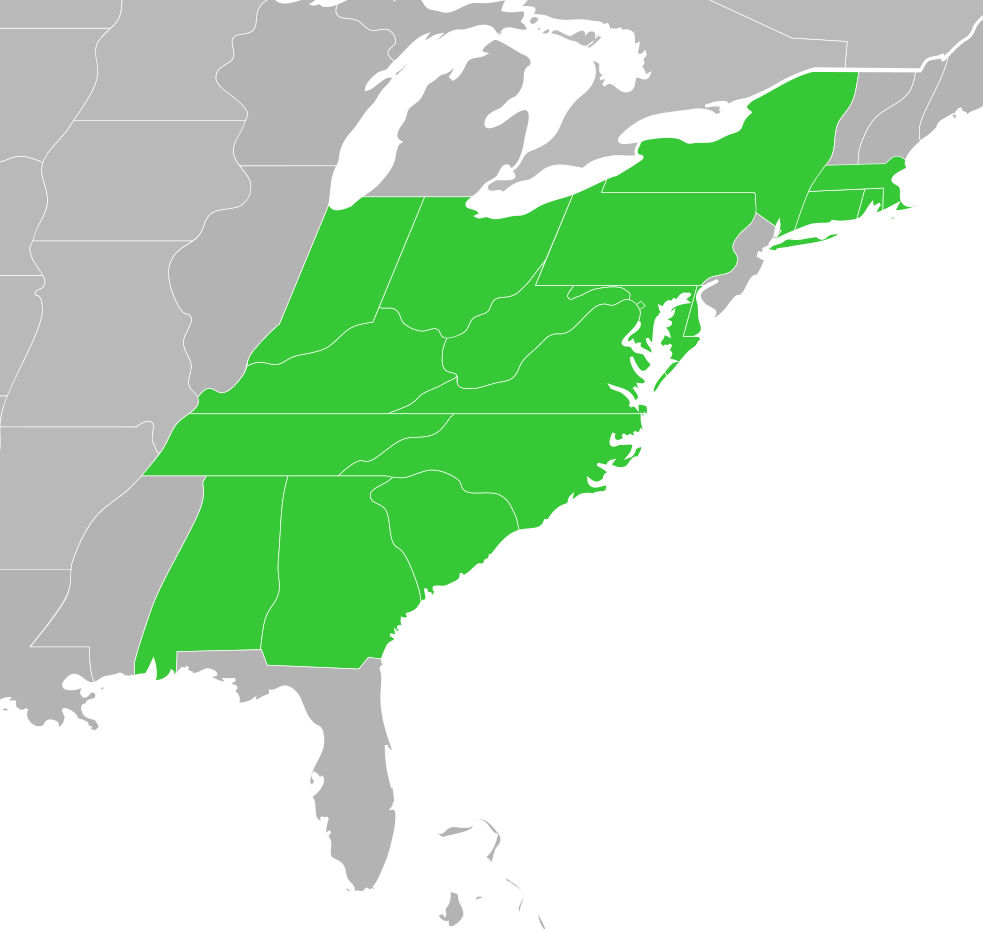
- Native distribution

Synonyms
- Aster patens var. phlogifolius (Muhl. ex Willd.) Nees; Aster phlogifolius Muhl. ex Willd.; Virgulus patens var. phlogifolius (Willd.) Reveal & Keener

= Symphyotrichum phlogifolium =

Species of flowering plant in the daisy family

Symphyotrichum phlogifolium (formerly Aster phlogifolius) is a species of flowering plant in the family Asteraceae native to the eastern United States. Commonly known as thin-leaf late purple aster, it is a perennial, herbaceous plant that may reach heights between 50 and 130 centimeters (1 3/4 and 4 1/4 feet). Its flowers have light to dark reddish-purple ray florets and white disk florets with purple triangular lobes.

== Gallery ==
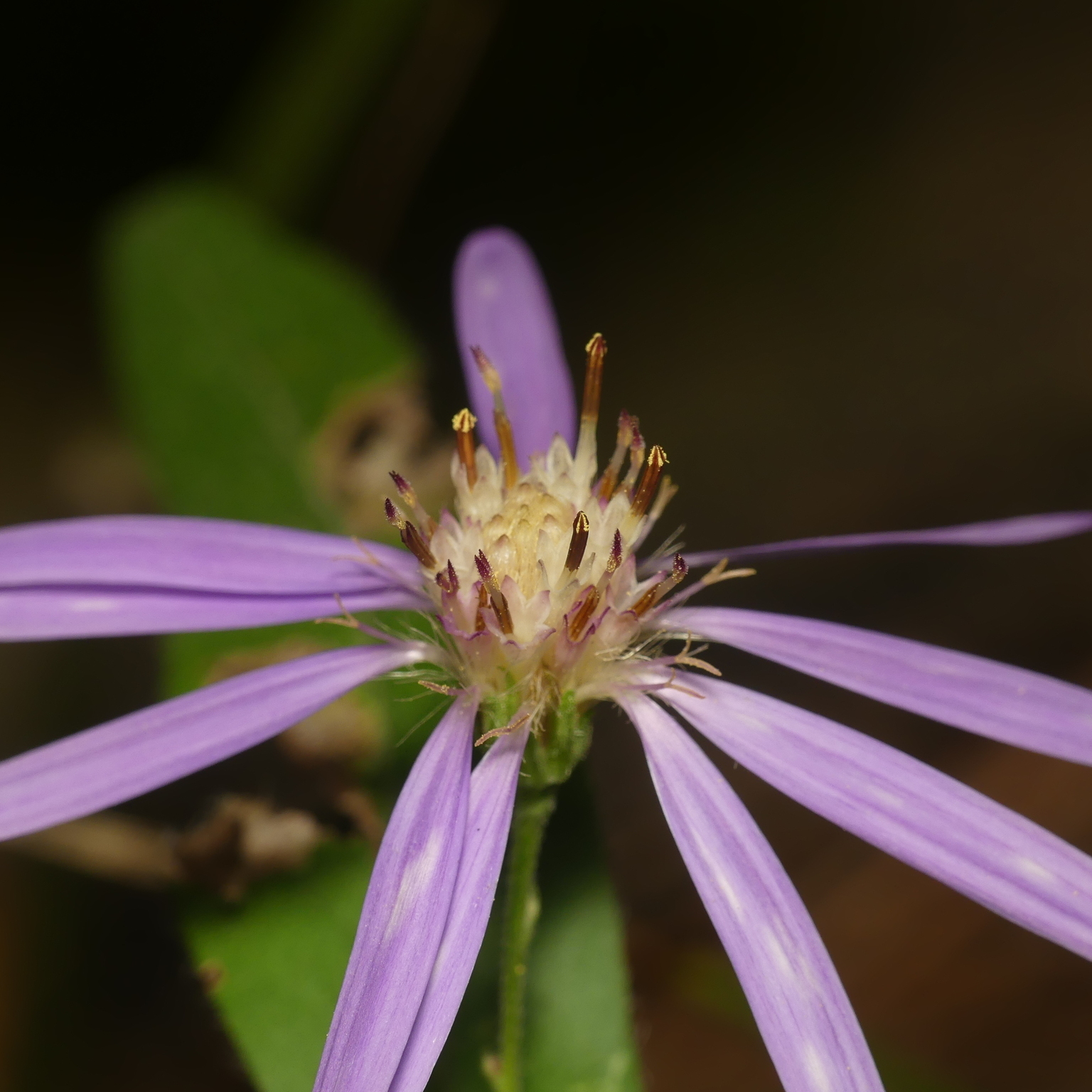

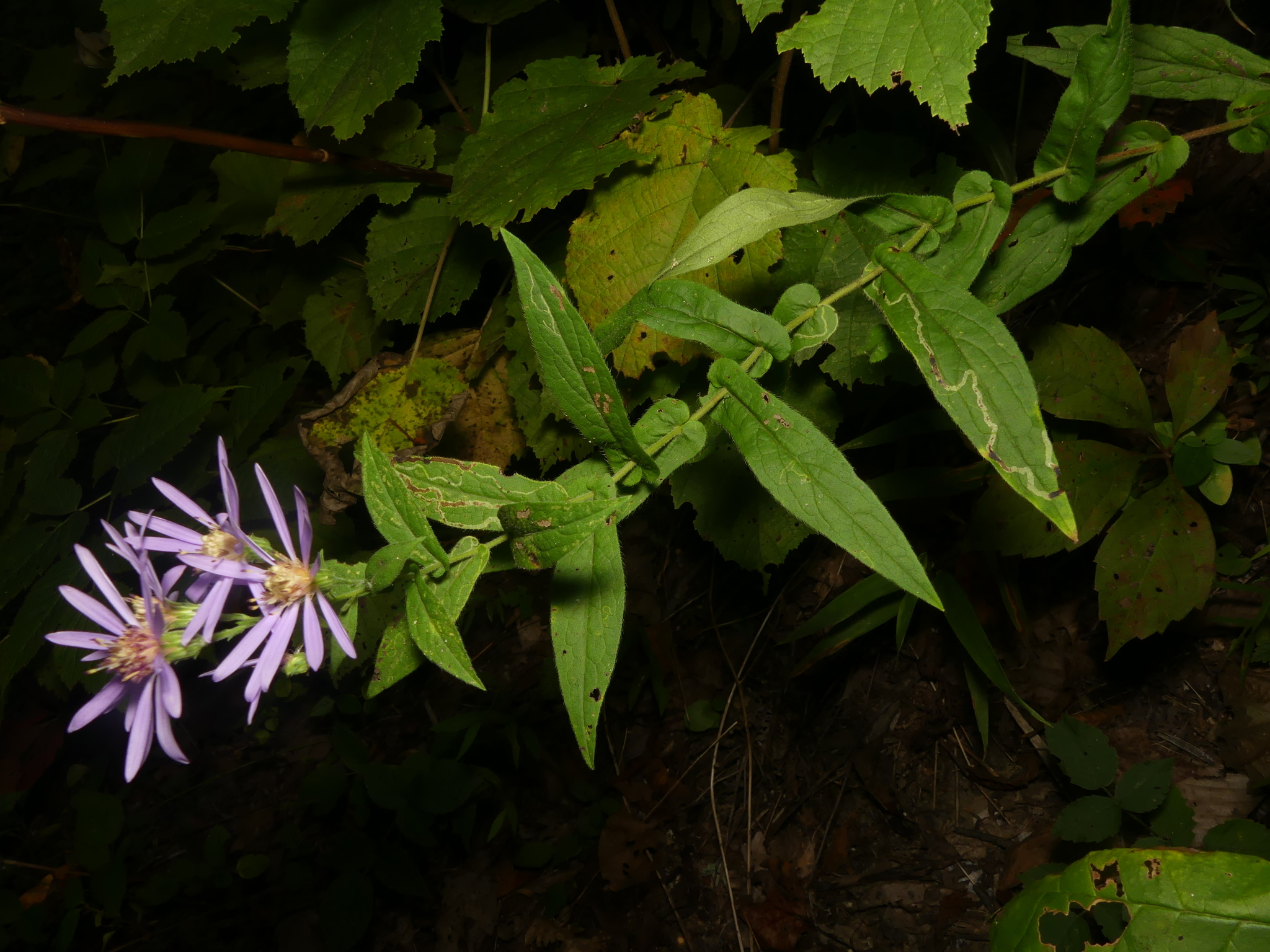

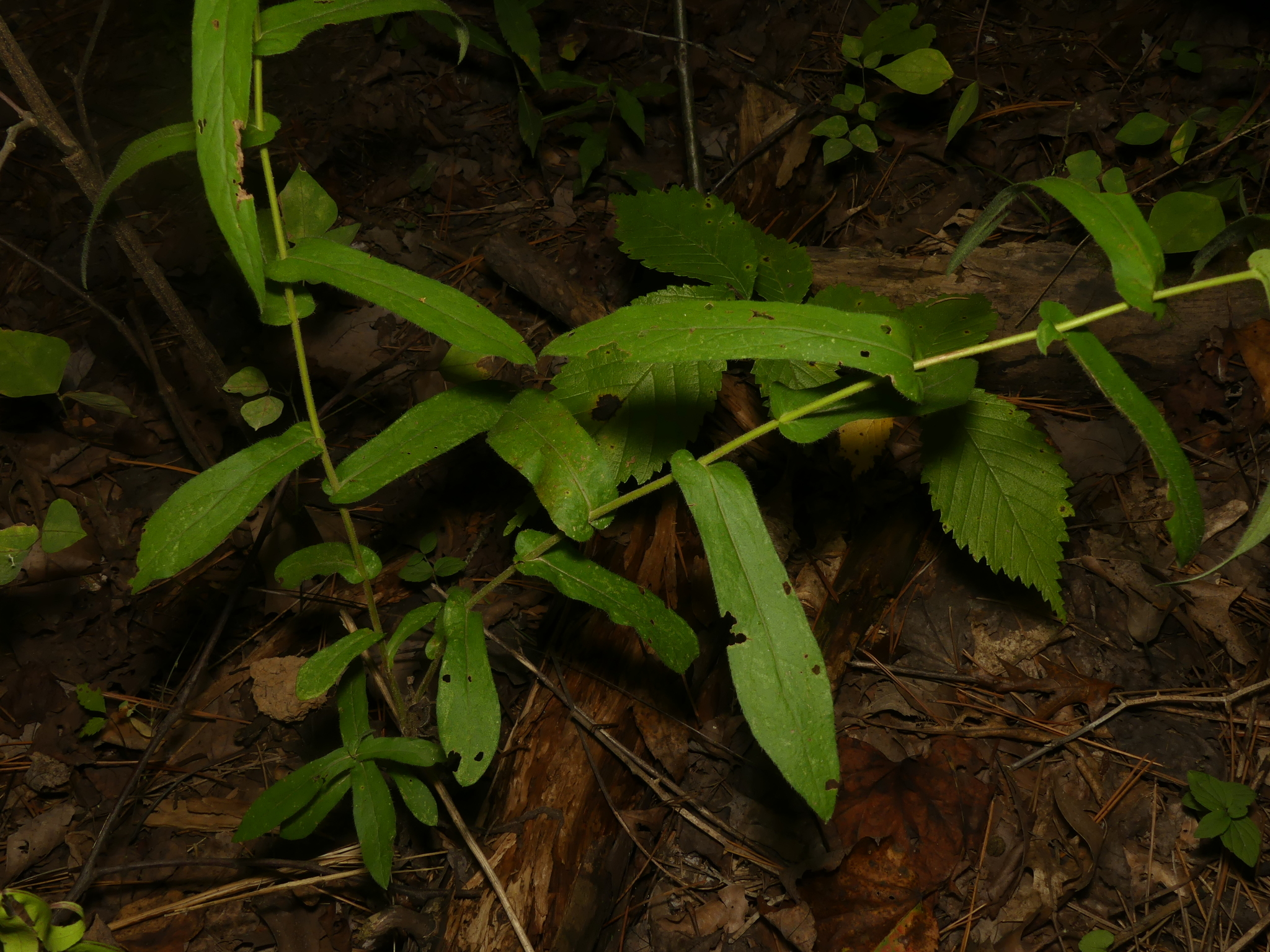

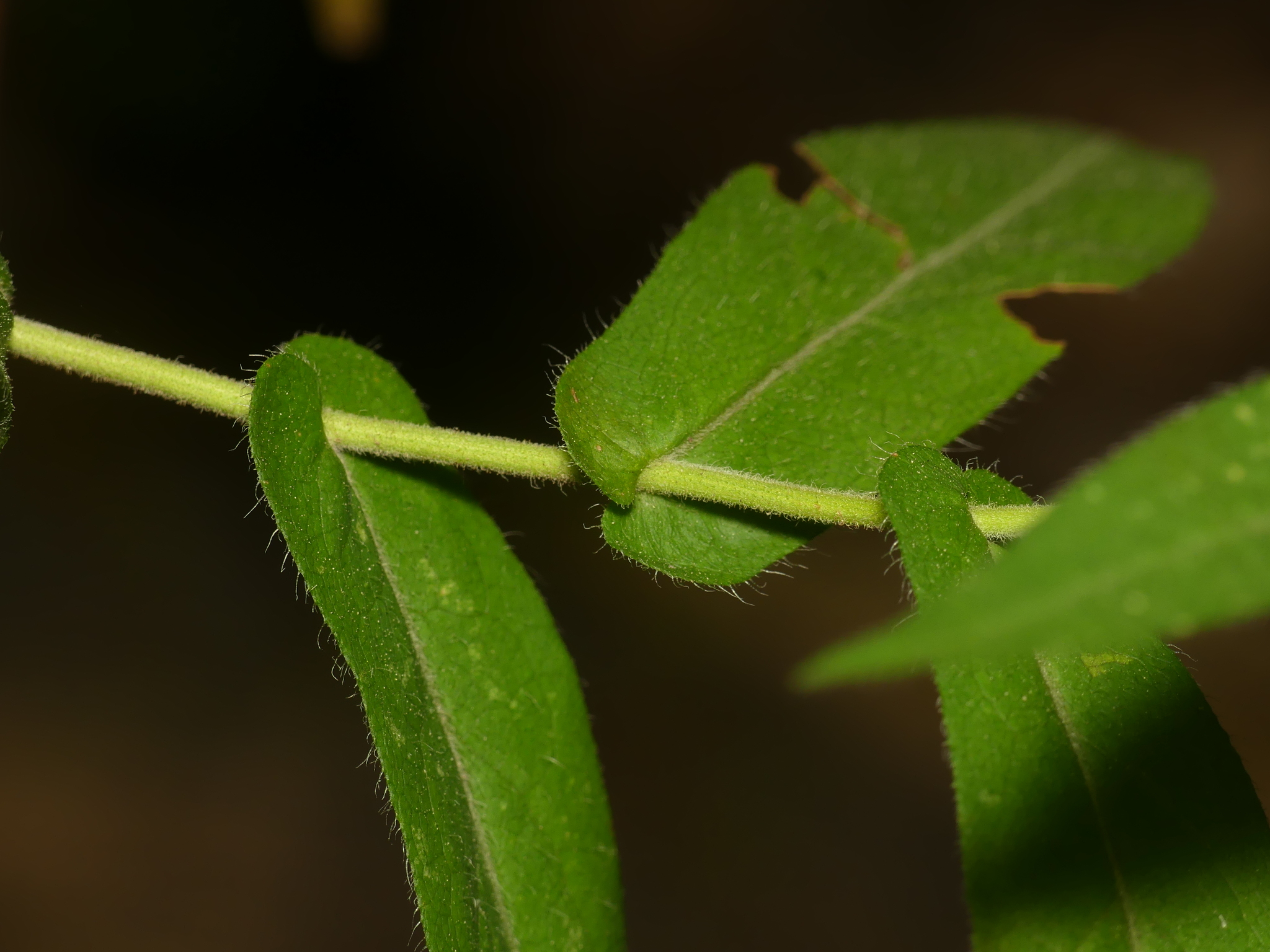
