= Flora (publication) =

Work describing plants occurring in an area or time period

A Flora is a book or other work which describes the plant species occurring in an area or time period, often with the aim of allowing identification. The term is usually capitalized to distinguish it from the use of "flora" to mean the plants rather than their descriptions. Some classic and modern Floras are listed below.

Traditionally Floras are books, but some are now published on CD-ROM or websites. The area that a Flora covers can be either geographically or politically defined. Floras usually require some specialist botanical knowledge to use with any effectiveness.

A Flora often contains diagnostic keys. Often these are dichotomous keys, which require the user to repeatedly examine a plant, and decide which one of two alternatives given in the Flora best applies to the plant.

Floras produced at a local or regional level rarely contain identification keys. Instead they aim to impart more detailed understanding of the local status and distribution of that area's plants. Maps showing species distribution may be included, and nowadays are computer-generated from biological databases. Specific reference may be made to new arrivals and historic records in order to impart understanding of the changes in an area's vegetation over time.

== Classic Floras ==
Europe

- Sylva Hercynia, Johannes Thal. Germany 1588
- Hortus Lusatiae, Johannes Franke. Germany 1594
- Stirpium et fossilium Silesiae Catalogus, Caspar Schwenckfeldt. Germany 1600
- Flora Jenensis, Heinrich Bernhard Rupp Germany, 1718.
- Flora Suecica, Carl Linnaeus. 1745.
- Flora Londinensis, William Curtis. England 1777–1798
- Deutschlands_Flora_in_Abbildungen, Johann Georg Sturm. Germany 1796
- Flora Graeca, John Sibthorp. (England) 1806–1840
- Flora Danica, Simon Paulli. Denmark, 1847.
- Flora von Deutschland, Österreich und der Schweiz, Otto Wilhelm Thomé. Germany 1886
- Atlas des plantes de France, Amédée Masclef. France 1891
- Bilder ur Nordens Flora, Carl Axel Magnus Lindman. Sweden 1901–1905

India

- Hortus indicus malabaricus, Hendrik van Rheede 1683–1703

Indonesia

- Flora Javae, Carl Ludwig Blume and Joanne Baptista Fischer. 1828.

North America

- Flora americae septentrionalis; or A Systematic Arrangement and Description of The Plants of North America, Frederick Pursh. (London) 1814.
- Flora Virginica, Johannes Fredericus Gronovius using the collections of John Clayton. (The Netherlands) 1762.

== Modern Floras ==
=== Americas ===
Caribbean

- Britton, N. L., and Percy Wilson. Scientific Survey of Porto Rico and the Virgin Islands — Volume V, Part 1: Botany of Porto Rico and the Virgin Islands: Pandanales to Thymeleales. New York: New York Academy of Sciences, 1924.

Central & South America

- Flora Brasiliensis
- Flora of São Paulo in Brazil
- Flora of Chile
- Manual de Plantas de Costa Rica
- Flora of Ecuador
- Flora of Guatemala
- Flora de Nicaragua
- Flora of Peru
- Flora of the Guianas
- Flora of Panama
- ''Flora del Paraguay''
- Flora of Suriname
- Flora Mesoamericana (1994-ongoing) Introduction
- Flora of the Venezuelan Guayana
- Flora Neotropica (1968-ongoing) Organising committee website.

North America

- Flora of North America
- Weakley, Alan S. and Southeastern Flora Team. Flora of the Southeastern United States. 2025.
- Kearney, Thomas H. Arizona Flora. University of California Press, 1940.
- Hickman, James C., editor. The Jepson Manual: Higher Plants of California. University of California Press, 1993.
- Hultén, Eric. Flora of Alaska and Neighboring Territories: A Manual of the Vascular Plants. Stanford University Press, 1968.
- Radford, Albert E. Manual of the Vascular Flora of the Carolinas. University of North Carolina Press, 1968.
- Wilhelm, G. and L. Rericha. Flora of the Chicago Region: A Floristic and Ecological Synthesis. Indiana Academy of Science, 2017.
- Hitchcock, C. Leo, and Arthur Cronquist. Flora of the Pacific Northwest. University of Washington Press, 1973, 2018 (2nd edition). ISBN 9780295742892; it is a compressed version of Hitchcock and Cronquist, Vascular Plants of the Pacific Northwest, University of Washington Press, 1955-1969 (5 volumes)
- Cronquist, Arthur, Noel H. Holmgren, Patricia K. Holmgren, James L. Reveal and Rupert C. Barneby. Intermountain flora; vascular plants of the Intermountain West, U.S.A., New York Botanical Garden, 1972–2017 (9 volumes)
- Chadde, Steve W.. A Great Lakes Wetland Flora. 2nd ed. Pocketflora Press, 2002. ISBN 0-9651385-5-0
- Strausbaugh, P. D. and E. L. Core. Flora of West Virginia. 2nd ed. Seneca Books Inc., 1964. ISBN 0-89092-010-9
- Rhoads, A. F. and T. A Block. The Plants of Pennsylvania. University of Pennsylvania Press, 2000. ISBN 0-8122-3535-5
- Britton, N. L. and Hon. A. Brown. An Illustrated Flora of the Northern United States and Canada. In three volumes. Dover Publications, 1913, 1970. ISBN 0-486-22642-5
- Stone, W. The Plants of Southern New Jersey. Annual Report of the State Museum of New Jersey, 1910.
- Ludwig, J. Christopher, Townsend, Johnny, Fleming, Gary F., and Weakley, Alan S. Flora of Virginia. 2011.

=== Asia ===
China and Japan

- Flora of China
- Flora of China in eFloras
- Flora of Japan

Southeast Asia

- Flora of Thailand Flora of Thailand
- Florae Siamensis Enumeratio
- Flora Malesiana (1984-ongoing) About Flora Malesiana.
- Flora of the Malay Peninsula
- Flore du Cambodge, du Laos et du Viêtnam

Indian region and Sri Lanka

- Flora of Bhutan
- Flora of the Presidency of Madras by J.S. Gamble (1915–36)
- Flora of Nepal
- Bengal Plants by D. Prain (1903)
- Flora of the upper Gangetic plains by J. F. Duthie (1903–29)
- Botany of Bihar and Orissa by H.H. Haines (1921–25)
- Flora of British India (1872–1897) by Sir J.D. Hooker

Middle East and western Asia

- Flora of Turkey
- Flora Iranica
- Flora Palaestina:
  - M. Zohary (1966). Flora Palaestina part 1.
  - M. Zohary (1972). Flora Palaestina part 2.
  - N. Feinbrun (1978). Flora Palaestina part 3.
  - N. Feinbrun (1986). Flora Palaestina part 4.
  - A. Danin, (2004). Distribution Atlas of Plants in the Flora Palaestina Area (Flora Palaestina part 5).
  - Online updates: https://web.archive.org/web/20070828033350/http://flora.huji.ac.il/browse.asp?lang=en&action=showfile&fileid=14005

=== Australasia ===
- Flora of Australia
- Flora of New Zealand series:
  - Allan, H.H. 1961, reprinted 1982. Flora of New Zealand. Volume I: Indigenous Tracheophyta - Psilopsida, Lycopsida, Filicopsida, Gymnospermae, Dicotyledons. ISBN 0-477-01056-3.
  - Moore, L.B.; Edgar, E. 1970, reprinted 1976. Flora of New Zealand. Volume II: Indigenous Tracheophyta - Monocotyledons except Graminae. ISBN 0-477-01889-0.
  - Healy, A.J.; Edgar, E. 1980. Flora of New Zealand Volume III. Adventive Cyperaceous, Petalous & Spathaceous Monocotyledons. ISBN 0-477-01041-5.
  - Webb, C.J.; Sykes, W.R.; Garnock-Jones, P.J. 1988. Flora of New Zealand Volume IV: Naturalised Pteridophytes, Gymnosperms, Dicotyledons. ISBN 0-477-02529-3.
  - Edgar, E.; Connor, H.E. 2000. Flora of New Zealand Volume V: Grasses. ISBN 0-478-09331-4.
  - Volumes I-V: First electronic edition, Landcare Research, June 2004. Transcribed by A.D. Wilton and I.M.L. Andres.
- Galloway, D.J. 1985. Flora of New Zealand: Lichens. ISBN 0-477-01266-3.
- Croasdale, H.; Flint, E.A. 1986. Flora of New Zealand: Desmids. Volume I. ISBN 0-477-02530-7.
- Croasdale, H.; Flint, E.A. 1988. Flora of New Zealand: Desmids. Volume II. ISBN 0-477-01353-8.
- Croasdale, H.; Flint, E.A.; Racine, M.M. 1994. Flora of New Zealand: Desmids. Volume III. ISBN 0-477-01642-1.
- Sykes, W.R.; West, C.J.; Beever, J.E.; Fife, A.J. 2000. Kermadec Islands Flora - Special Edition. ISBN 0-478-09339-X.

=== Pacific Islands ===
- Flora Vitiensis Nova, a New Flora of Fiji
- Manual of the Flowering Plants of Hawai‘i, Warren L. Wagner and Derral R. Herbst (1991) + suppl.
- Flore de la Nouvelle-Calédonie (New Caledonia
- Flore de la Polynésie Française (J. Florence, vol. 1 & 2, 1997 & 2004)

=== Europe ===
British Isles

- Bowen, Humphry. The Flora of Berkshire. Oxford: Holywell Press, 1968. ASIN B010Q7GF28.
- Morton, Osbourne. Marine Algae of Northern Ireland. Belfast: Ulster Museum, 1994. ISBN 0-900761-28-8
- Stace, Clive Anthony, and Hilli Thompson (illustrator). A New Flora of the British Isles. 2nd ed. Cambridge University Press, 1997. ISBN 0-521-58935-5.
- Beesley, S. and J. Wilde. Urban Flora of Belfast. Belfast: Institute of Irish Studies, Queen's University of Belfast, 1997.
- Killick, John, Roy Perry and Stan Woodell. Flora of Oxfordshire. Pisces Publications, 1998. ISBN 1-874357-07-2.
- Bowen, Humphry. The Flora of Dorset. Pisces Publications, 2000. ISBN 1-874357-16-1.
- Milliken, William and Sam Bridgewater. Flora Celtica – Plants and people in Celtic Europe. Birlinn, 2004. ISBN 978-1841583037. Paperback edition, 2013. ISBN 978-1780271699.

Rest of Europe

- Flora Europaea at the site of The Royal Botanical Gardens of Edinburgh Flora Europaea
- Flora of Europe
- Flora Gallica, published by Société Botanique de France
- Flora iberica
- Flora of Acores
- Flora Danica
- Flora of Romania
- Norsk flora (Norwegian flora)

=== Africa and Madagascar ===
- Flore du Gabon
- Flore du Cameroun
- Flora of Tropical Africa
- Flora of Tropical East Africa
- Flora of West Tropical Africa
- Flore de la Côte d'Ivoire
- Flora Capensis
- Flora Zambesiaca
- Flora of South Africa
- Flore du Rwanda
- Flore de Madagascar et des Comores
- Flore pratique du Maroc

== See also ==
- List of electronic floras
