= Bowen's Kale =

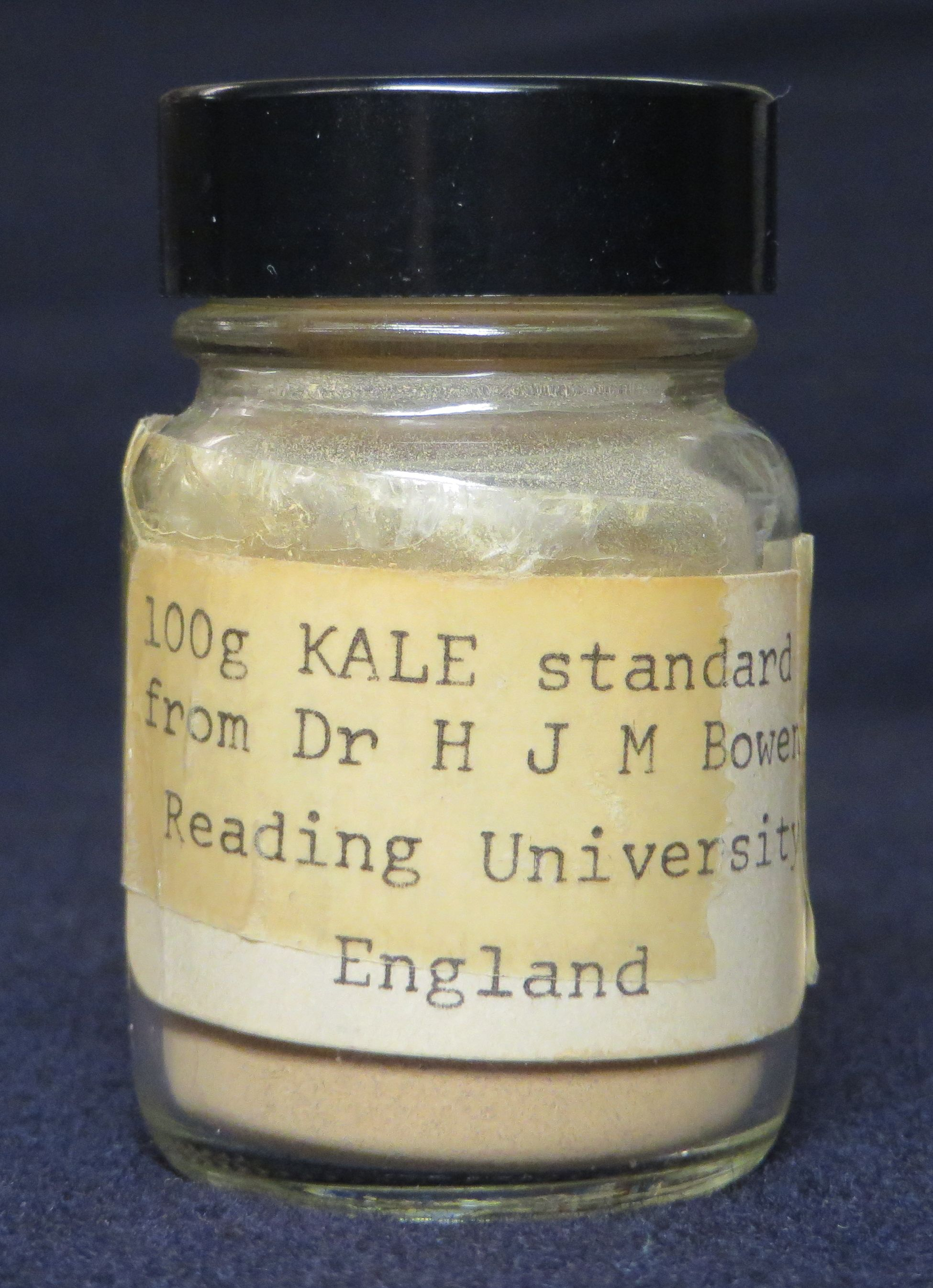
A jar of Bowen's Kale, in the collection of the History of Science Museum, University of Oxford, England

Bowen's Kale was a reference material produced by British chemist Humphry Bowen and used for the calibration of early scientific instruments intended to measure trace elements during the 1960s.

With Peter Cawse, Bowen grew, dried, and crushed a large amount of marrow-stem kale (Brassica oleracea var. medullosa) into 100 kilograms (220 lb) of a homogeneous and stable powder in 1960 that was subsequently freely distributed to researchers around the world for over two decades. This was probably the first successful example of such a de facto standard. Bowen's Kale stimulated the preparation of further materials by other organizations for similar use.

== See also ==
- Reference standard

== Bibliography ==
- Bowen, H. J. M., A standard biological material for elementary analysis. In P. W. Sallis (ed.), Proc. of the SAC Conference, Nottingham, UK, pp. 25–31. Cambridge: W. Heffer and Sons, 1965.
- Bowen, H. J. M., Kale as a reference material. In W. R. Wolf (ed.), Biological Reference Materials: Availability, uses and need for validation of nutrient measurement, pp. 3–17. John Wiley & Sons, 1984.
- Stoeppler, M., Wolf, W. R. and Jenks, P. J. (eds.), Reference Materials for Chemical Analysis: Certification, Availability and Proper Usage. Weinheim: Wiley-VCH, 2001. ISBN 3-527-30162-3. (See pages 4, 26, 59 & 216.)
