= Sandra Knapp =

American botanist

Sandra Diane Knapp OBE FLS FRS
- Knapp in 2026
- Born: 1956 (age 69–70)
- Education: Pomona College; Cornell University
- Occupations: Botanist; Author
- Employer(s): Natural History Museum, London
- Scientific career
- Author abbrev. (botany): S.Knapp

Sandra Diane Knapp OBE FLS FRS (born 1956) is an American-born botanist. She is a merit researcher of the Plants Division of the Natural History Museum, London and from 2018 was the president of the Linnean Society of London. While working at the Natural History Museum, London she has overseen the Flora Mesoamericana inventory of Central American plants. She has published several books on botanical subjects as well as a significant number of scientific articles. In 2016 she was awarded the Linnean Medal. In 2022 she was elected as a Fellow of the Royal Society. In 2023 she was appointed an Officer of the Order of the British Empire (OBE) and was awarded the Engler Medal in Gold by the International Association for Plant Taxonomy.

== Education ==
Knapp has a B.A. in botany from Pomona College (1978) and a PhD from Cornell University (1986), where she worked with Michael D. Whalen.

== Work ==
Knapp specialises in various taxa within the genus Solanum, including the Geminata clade, the Dulcamaroid clade, the Thelopodium clade, the Pteroidea group and the tomato (Solanum lycopersicum) and relatives. She is also an expert in other taxa within the nightshade family (Solanaceae), including the genus Nicotiana and the tribes Anthocercidae and Juanulloeae.

Knapp has collected plants in Central and South America for the Missouri Botanical Garden and Cornell University, among others. She has also worked for the Institute for Botanical Exploration at Mississippi State University.

Since 1992, Knapp has been active as a scientific researcher in the botany department of the Natural History Museum in London. She is involved in field work and research in the herbarium. She also contributes to taxonomic research of the Geminta and Dulcamaroid clades, in particular in the context of the Planetary Biodiversity Inventory project Solanum, a worldwide research project to map nightshades. She participates in a collaborative project to clarify the genomic evolution of Nicotiana. She is also active in involving the private sector in the implementation of the biodiversity treaty in Gran Chaco. She is an editor of the Flora Mesoamericana publication series, a project aimed at mapping as many plants as possible found in Mesoamerica .

She has authored several books on botany or botanical exploration and has written over 200 peer reviewed scientific articles. The French-language edition of her book Potted Histories, entitled Le Voyage Botanique, was awarded the Prix Pierre-Joseph Redouté in 2004, a prize that was established in 2000 in honour of the best French-language plant book in a given year.

She has also published numerous botanical names, in particular taxa within the Nightshade family. Knapp has published three botanical names of passion flowers together with lepidopterist James Mallet. One of them, Passiflora macdougaliana, they named after Passiflora specialist John MacDougal. MacDougal himself named Passiflora sandrae after Knapp.

== Committees, panels and societies ==
She is a member of the Biotechnology and Biological Sciences Research Council Innovator of the Year panel, a member of the Shenzhen Declaration for Plant Sciences Committee, and a member of the National Geographic Grants Committee. She did important work in 2011 (at the XVIII International Botanical Congress in Melbourne and in 2017 at the XIX International Botanical Congress in Shenzhen by chairing the committees on botanical nomenclature. The changes made had the effect modernizing the nomenclatural rules for fungi, algae, and plants to allow electronic publication of names, and to create a registry of plant names to make it easier to retrieve botanical names. In May 2017 Knapp became the president-elect of the Linnean Society of London, and in May 2018 succeeded Prof. Paul Brakefield as president. She is also a member of the American Academy of Arts and Sciences.

== Scientific outreach ==
In October 1999, Knapp discussed her book Footsteps in the Forest: Alfred Wallace in the Amazon on the BBC World Service's Science in Action. Knapp was an interviewed guest on BBC Radio 3's Night Waves in July 2013 in a segment about Alfred Russel Wallace. She appeared on the BBC Radio 4 programme In Our Time in May 2014 to explain photosynthesis. In October 2014 Knapp was a guest on BBC Radio 4's The Museum of Curiosity. Her hypothetical donation to this fictional museum was the South American freeze-dried potato product Chuño. A year later, in Natural History Heroes, a series collaborating between Radio 4 and the Natural History Museum, London she chose "Miss – not Dr – Alice Eastwood" as her hero. In July 2017, Knapp was a guest on the BBC World Service's The Forum, where she discussed Carl Linnaeus. In October 2019 Knapp appeared on In Our Time, this time to talk about hybrids.

== Honours and awards ==
In 2016 she was awarded, jointly with Georgina Mace, the Linnean Medal of the Linnean Society. In 2009 she was presented with the Peter Raven Outreach Award for public engagement with science by the American Society of Plant Taxonomists and the UK National Biodiversity Network's John Burnett Medal. University College London and Stockholm University have both awarded Knapp with honorary professorships. In 2022 she was awarded the David Fairchild Medal for Plant Exploration by the United States National Tropical Botanic Garden. Also in 2022 Knapp was elected as a Fellow of the Royal Society.

Knapp was appointed Officer of the Order of the British Empire (OBE) in the 2023 New Year Honours for services to botany and the public understanding of science. In 2023 Knapp was awarded the Engler Medal in Gold by the International Association for Plant Taxonomy in recognition for her outstanding lifetime contribution to taxonomy and systematics of plants, algae, or fungi. This award will be presented in July 2024 at the International Botanical Congress.

== Bibliography ==
- Footsteps in the Forest: Alfred Wallace in the Amazon. London: The Natural History Museum. 1999. ISBN 978-0-565-09143-9.
- Potted Histories: An Artistic Voyage Through Plant Exploration. London: Scriptum. 2003. ISBN 978-1-902686-28-8.
- Flora: The Art of Plant Exploration. London: The Natural History Museum. 2014. ISBN 978-0565093341.
- Extraordinary orchids. London: Natural History Museum, London. 2021. ISBN 978-0565095-14-7.
- Flower Day: A Story of 24 Hours and 24 Floral Lives. Chicago: University of Chicago. 2025. ISBN 978-0226834-52-8.

== See also ==
- Category:Taxa named by Sandra Knapp
