= Passiflora xiikzodz =

Scientific classification
- Kingdom: Plantae
- Clade: Tracheophytes
- Clade: Angiosperms
- Clade: Eudicots
- Clade: Rosids
- Order: Malpighiales
- Family: Passifloraceae
- Genus: Passiflora
- Species: P. xiikzodz

Binomial name
- Passiflora xiikzodz J.M.MacDougal

Species of plant

Passiflora xiikzodz, the xiikzodz, is a species of flowering plant in the passion flower/passion fruit family Passifloraceae, native to southeastern Mexico, Belize, and Guatemala. The specific epithet is derived from the Mayan vernacular name for the species, and means "bat-wing". It is closely related to Passiflora itzensis but attempts to cross-pollinate the two species do not result in any offspring. It is one of only two species (the other is Passiflora alata) which have eight concentric series of coronas; the most of any known plant. The coronal series are a deep purplish-black. The flowers have no petals and the sepals are green.
