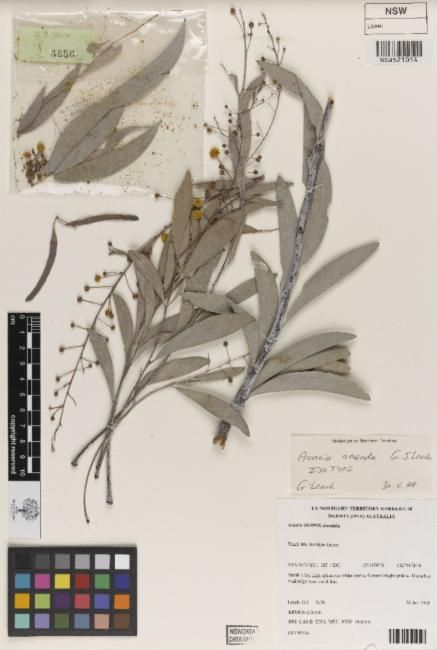
- Herbarium specimen collected in Kakadu National Park

Conservation status
- Near Threatened (TPWCA)

Scientific classification
- Kingdom: Plantae
- Clade: Tracheophytes
- Clade: Angiosperms
- Clade: Eudicots
- Clade: Rosids
- Order: Fabales
- Family: Fabaceae
- Subfamily: Caesalpinioideae
- Clade: Mimosoid clade
- Genus: Acacia
- Species: A. amanda

Binomial name
- Acacia amanda G.J.Leach
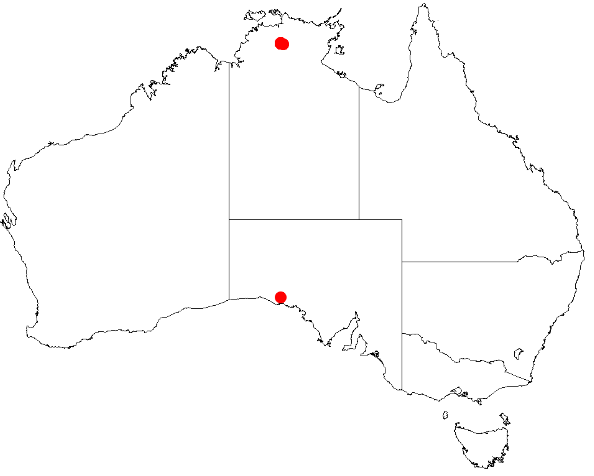
- Occurrence data from AVH

Synonyms
- Acacia amanda Maslin nom. inval.; Racosperma amanda (G.J.Leach) Pedley; Acacia amanda Maslin nom. inval.; Racosperma amandae Pedley orth. var.

= Acacia amanda =

Species of legume

Acacia amanda is a species of flowering plant in the family Fabaceae and is endemic to a very restricted part of the Northern Territory. It is an erect shrub with narrowly elliptic or elliptic, leathery phyllodes, flowers arranged spherical heads of golden yellow flowers usually arranged in a raceme, and narrowly oblong pods 42–110 mm (1.7–4.3 in) long.

== Description ==
Acacia amanda is an erect, often multi-stemmed shrub which grows to a height of 0.4–2 m (1 ft 4 in – 6 ft 7 in). Its branchlets are smooth, and have a waxy bloom. Its phyllodes are thinly leathery, narrowly elliptic to elliptic, straight to strongly curved, 38–124 mm (1.5–4.9 in) long and 8–36 mm (0.31–1.42 in) wide with three main veins. The flowers are golden yellow and arranged in spherical heads of 35 to 53, the heads in racemes 75–180 mm (3.0–7.1 in) long, with up to 3 heads in each axil, on a peduncle 15–35 mm (0.59–1.38 in) long. Flowering occurs from May to November and the fruit is a glabrous, papery, narrowly oblong pod 42–110 mm (1.7–4.3 in) long and 7–13 mm (0.28–0.51 in) wide, and prominently raised over the seeds. The seeds are 6.0–7.5 mm (0.24–0.30 in) long.

== Taxonomy ==
Acacia amanda was first formally described in 2001 by Gregory John Leach in the Flora of Australia from specimens he collected near the track to Jarrangbarnmi (Koolpin Gorge), in Kakadu National Park. The specific epithet (amanda) honours Leach's wife.

== Distribution ==
This species is endemic to a small area on the Arnhem Plateau in Kakadu.

== Conservation status ==
Acacia amanda is listed as "near threatened" under the Territory Parks Wildlife Conservation Act.

== See also ==
- List of Acacia species
