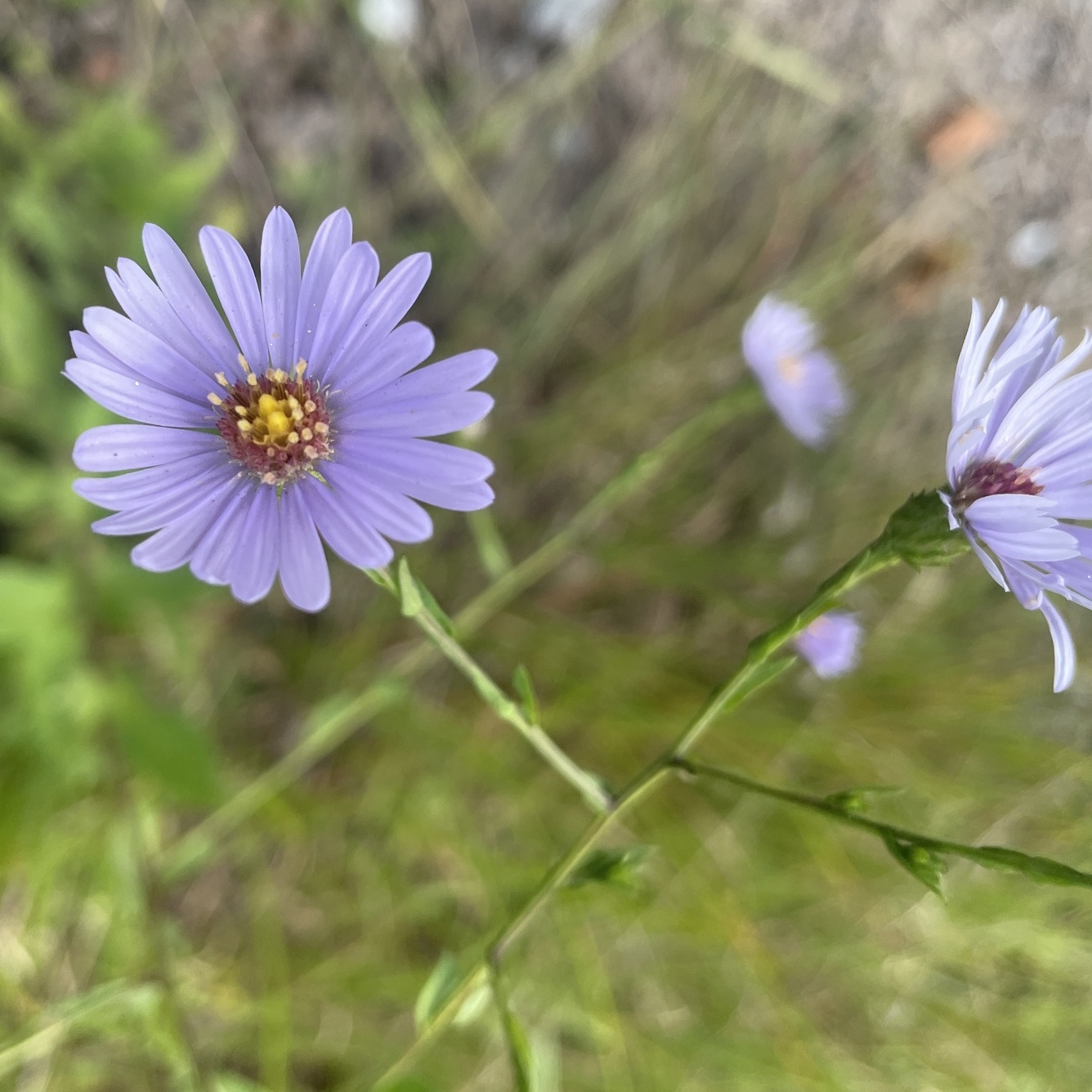

Conservation status
- Critically Imperiled (NatureServe)

Scientific classification
- Kingdom: Plantae
- Clade: Tracheophytes
- Clade: Angiosperms
- Clade: Eudicots
- Clade: Asterids
- Order: Asterales
- Family: Asteraceae
- Tribe: Astereae
- Subtribe: Symphyotrichinae
- Genus: Symphyotrichum
- Subgenus: Symphyotrichum subg. Symphyotrichum
- Section: Symphyotrichum sect. Symphyotrichum
- Species: S. rhiannon

Binomial name
- Symphyotrichum rhiannon Weakley & Govus
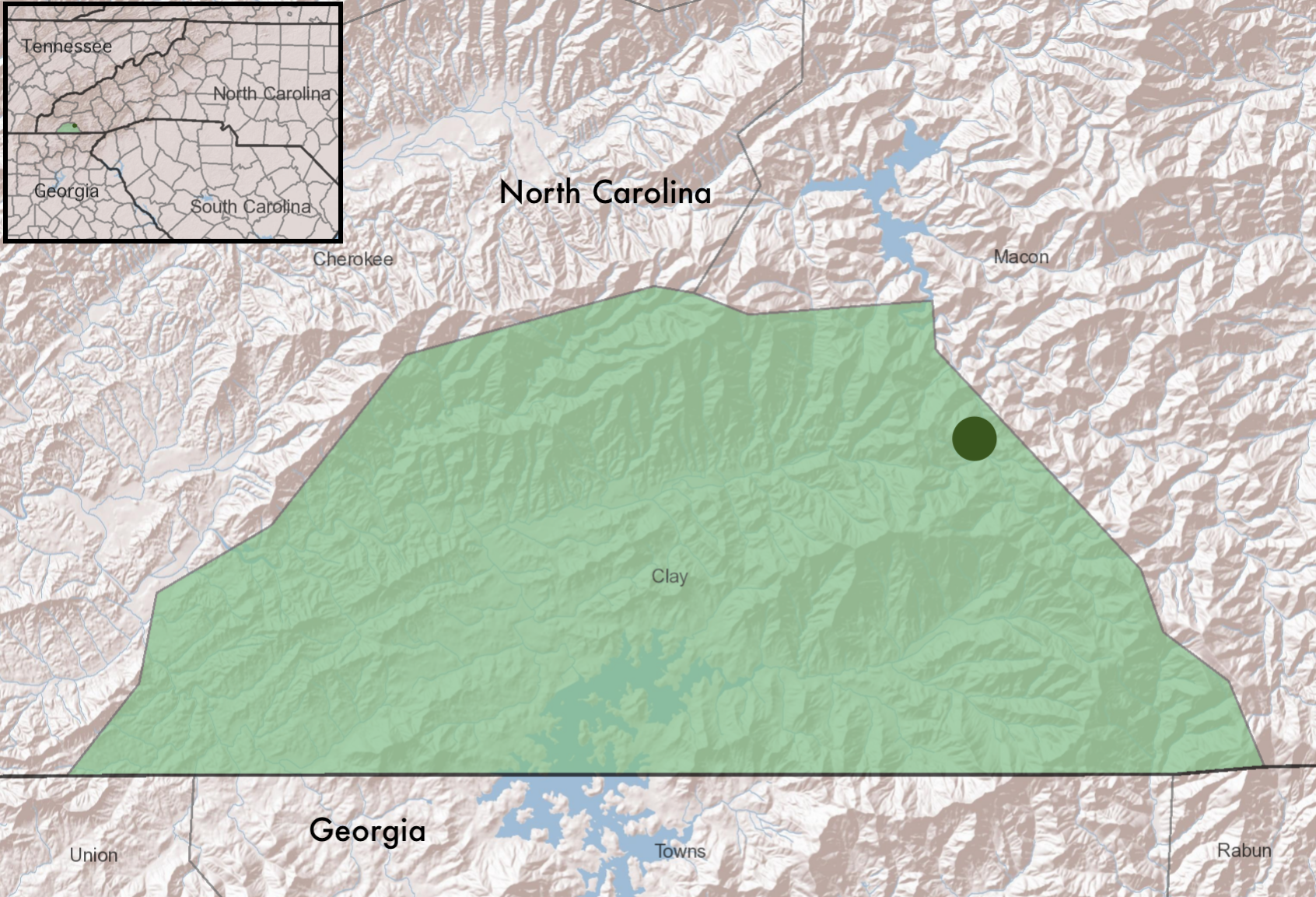
- Endemic distribution

= Symphyotrichum rhiannon =

Species of plant in the aster family

Symphyotrichum rhiannon is a species of flowering plant endemic to a serpentine barren in western North Carolina. It has been given the vernacular Rhiannon's aster and is also known as Buck Creek aster. It is a perennial, herbaceous plant in the family Asteraceae.

== Description ==
Symphyotrichum rhiannon is a perennial flowering plant that grows between heights of 15 and 60 centimeters (5.9 and 23.6 inches). It forms colonies from thin, long rhizomes, and blooms from September into November with flower heads that have 18–32 blue to lavender ray florets and yellow disk florets.

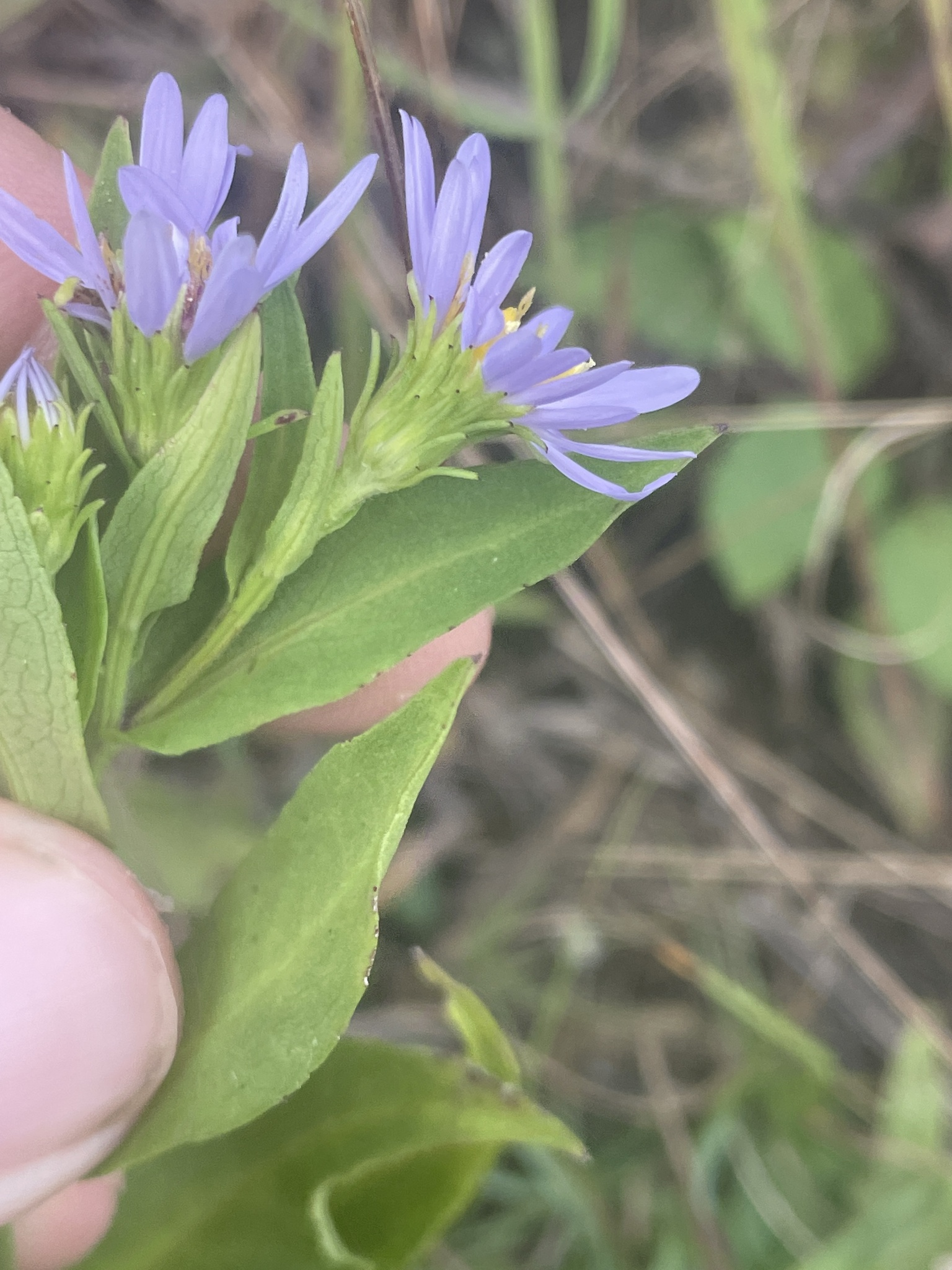
Involucre and phyllaries

=== Chromosomes ===
Symphyotrichum rhiannon has a base number of x = 8. Hexaploid cytotype with a chromosome count of 48 has been reported.

== Taxonomy ==
Symphyotrichum rhiannon was formally described by Alan Stuart Weakley and Thomas E. Govus in 2004.

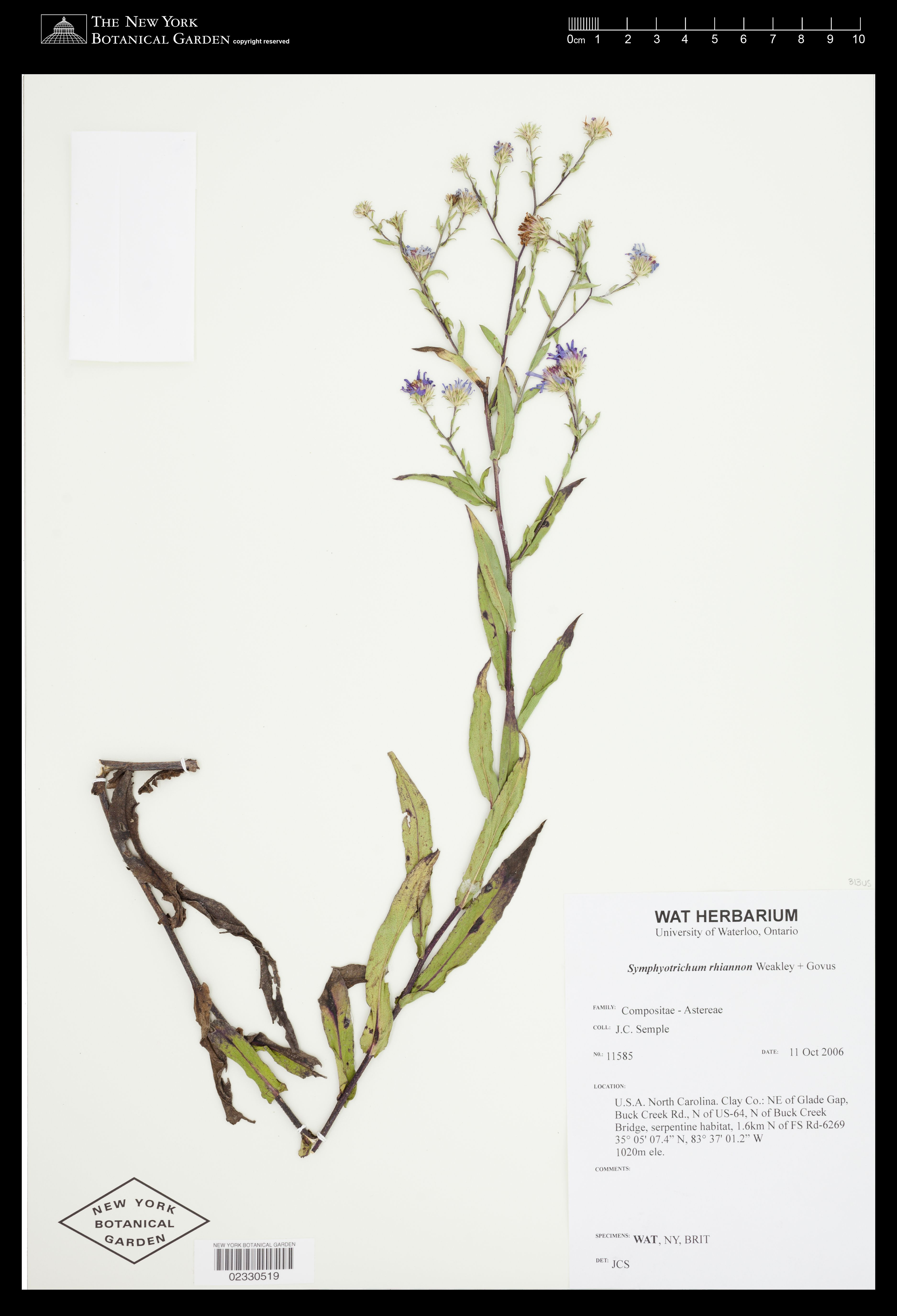
Symphyotrichum rhiannon herbarium specimen

=== Etymology ===
Kauffman, Nesom, et al., formally explained the etymology of the species as follows:

[It] is named in honor of Rhiannon Weakley, whose desire to rest during a field excursion led the authors to further investigate..., and also in honor of the original Rhiannon, a Welsh goddess figure....

Informally explained, Rhiannon Weakley was the toddler daughter of Alan and Allison Weakley. She needed a snack and a nap during the 2003 field excursion.

"Rhiannon hadn’t had a nap that morning," says Alan Weakley, "and she had a little, ah, loss of composure." So the group plopped down to give Rhiannon a snack and a chance to rest. And there, growing all around, was [Laura] Mansberg's mystery aster.

== Distribution and habitat ==
Symphyotrichum rhiannon is endemic to the Buck Creek Serpentine Barrens in Clay County, North Carolina, in the Nantahala National Forest.

== Conservation ==
NatureServe lists it as Critically Imperiled (G1).
