= Lepidopetalum =

Scientific classification
- Kingdom: Plantae
- Clade: Tracheophytes
- Clade: Angiosperms
- Clade: Eudicots
- Clade: Rosids
- Order: Sapindales
- Family: Sapindaceae
- Tribe: Cupanieae
- Genus: Lepidopetalum; Blume

Type species
- Lepidopetalum perrottetii (Cambess.) Blume

Species
- See text

Genus of trees

Lepidopetalum is a genus of six species of trees known to science, constituting part of the plant family Sapindaceae.

They grow naturally in New Guinea, New Britain, New Ireland, Bougainville, the Andaman and Nicobar Islands, Sumatra and Cape York Peninsula, Queensland, Australia.

== Description ==
- Trees or sometimes remaining as shrubs, with greyish brown bark; monoecious; indumentum only simple hairs.
- Branchlets smooth or slightly grooved, lenticellate, hairy in new growth.
- Leaves paripinnate, without stipules, arranged alternately, petiole attachment to branch swollen, that and rachis not winged.
- Leaflets arranged ± opposite, increasing in size from base to apex, first ovate then to elliptic and obovate; petiolule short with a pulvinule; blade base cuneate, margins smooth, flat, both surfaces smooth apart from undersides’ hair–tufts domatia and raised veins.
- Inflorescences ramiflorous or arising from leaf axils, reduced thyrses with each node bearing usually 3 short cymes.
- Flowers regular–symmetrical, yellow–cream–white, pedicellate. Calyx of 5 sepals with triangular to oval–shaped lobes. Petals tiny, with their scales larger and usually without crests. Disc circular surrounding the bases of the 8–10 hairy stamens. Ovary 2 locular.
- Fruits obovoid–shaped, dehiscent red capsules, each composed of 2 valves and usually only developing 1 seed.
- Seeds ellipse-like shaped, black, with orange arils, which cover them from only at the base to nearly completely.

—Sourced from Flora Malesiana and the Flora of Australia.

== Species ==
This listing was sourced from Flora Malesiana, and the Australian Plant Name Index and Australian Plant Census.:

- Lepidopetalum fructoglabrum Welzen – New Guinea
- Lepidopetalum micans Lauterb. & K.Schum. – New Guinea
- Lepidopetalum montanum (Blume) Radlk. – Andaman Is. and Nicobar Is., Sumatra
- Lepidopetalum perrottetii (Cambess.) Blume – Philippines
- Lepidopetalum subdichotomum Radlk. – Solomon Is., New Guinea, New Britain, New Ireland, Bougainville
- Lepidopetalum xylocarpum Radlk. – New Guinea

The species identification of the trees which grow naturally in Cape York Peninsula, Australia, has differed through recent history and between published sources. In 1985 Sally T. Reynolds published the name L. subdichotomum for them, in her scientific paper and the Flora of Australia treatment. In Peter C. van Welzen's 1992 genus review scientific paper and 1994 Flora Malesiana treatment only L. xylocarpum has the NE. Australia distribution record. As of November 2013 the Australian Plant Name Index implies the accepted name of L. xylocarpum for Australian plants and the name L. subdichotomum as misapplied to them, but the Australian Plant Census has not explicitly recorded that current accepted name; the previous current accepted name L. fructoglabrum no longer appears listed. The Queensland Herbarium's 2013 Census of the Queensland Flora, the 2004 Fruits of the Australian Tropical Rainforest major book and the Australian Tropical Rainforest Plants information system (Dec 2010) record L. fructoglabrum as the accepted name. Hence as of November 2013, collectively these sources indicate that the species identification of the NE. Australian trees remains uncertain.
