= Flore du Cambodge, du Laos et du Viêtnam =

Flore du Cambodge, du Laos et du Viêtnam is a multi-volume flora describing the vascular plants of Cambodia, Laos, and Vietnam, published by the National Museum of Natural History in Paris since the 1960s. It currently consists of 35 volumes.

== Volumes ==
- Volume 35 (2014): Solanaceae
- Volume 34 (2014): Polygalaceae
- Volume 33 (2014): Apocynaceae
- Volume 32 (2004): Myrsinaceae
- Volume 31 (2003): Gentianaceae
- Volume 30 (2001): Leguminosae - Papilionoideae - Millettieae
- Volume 29 (1997): Leguminoseuses, Papilionoidees, Dalbergiees
- Volume 28 (1995): Gymnospermae
- Volume 27 (1994): Legumineuses - Desmodiees
- Volume 26 (1992): Rhoipteleacees, Juglandacees, Thymelaeacees, Proteacees, Primulacees, Styracacees
- Volume 25 (1990): Dipterocarpacees
- Volume 24 (1989): Caryophyllales
- Volume 23 (1987): Legumineuses-Papilionoidees
- Volume 22 (1985): Bignoniacees
- Volume 21 (1985): Scrophulariaceae
- Volume 20 (1983): Pandanaceae, Sparganiaceae, Ruppiaceae, Aponogetonaceae, Smilaceae, Philydraceae, Hanuanaceae, Flagellariaceae, Restionaceae, Centrolepidaceae, Lowiaceae, Xyridaceae
- Volume 19 (1981): Leguminosae, Mimosoideae
- Volume 18 (1980): Leguminosae, Cesalpiniodeae
- Volume 17 (1979): Leguminosae, Phaseoleae
- Volume 16 (1977): Symplocaceae
- Volume 15 (1975): Cucurbitaceae
- Volume 14 (1973): Ochnaceae, Onagraceae, Trapaceae, Balanophoraceae, Rafflesiaceae, Podostemacea, Tristichaceae
- Volume 13 (1972): Loganiaceae, Buddlejaceae
- Volume 12 (1970): Hernandiaceae
- Volume 11 (1970): Flacourtiaceae, Bixaceae, Cochlospermaceae
- Volume 10 (1969): Combretaceae: O.Lecompte
- Volume 9 (1969): Campanulaceae
- Volume 8 (1968): Nyssaceae, Cornaceae, Alangiaceae
- Volume 7 (1968): Rosaceae (2)
- Volume 6 (1968): Rosaceae (1)
- Volume 5 (1967): Umbelliferae, Aizoaceae, Molluginaceae, Passifloraceae
- Volume 4 (1965): Saxifragaceae, Crypteroniaceae, Droseraceae, Hamamelidaceae, Haloragaceae, Rhizophoraceae, Sonneratiaceae, Punicaceae
- Volume 3 (1963): Sapotacees
- Volume 2 (1962): Anacardiaceae, Moringaceae, Connaraceae
- Volume 1 (1960): Sabiaceae

== Meetings ==
- 1st International symposium on the Flora of Cambodia, Laos and Vietnam (2008) - Phnom Penh, Cambodia.
- 2nd International symposium on the Flora of Cambodia, Laos and Vietnam (2010) - Hanoi, Vietnam.
- 3rd International symposium on the Flora of Cambodia, Laos and Vietnam (2015) - Vientiane, Laos.

== See also ==
- Flora of Thailand
- Flora Malesiana
