= FloraNT =

Public access web-based database

- Website type: Encyclopedia
- Available in: English
- Website: eflora.nt.gov.au/home
- Commercial: No
- Current status: Active

FloraNT is a public access web-based database of the Flora of the Northern Territory of Australia.

== Description ==
FloraNT provides authoritative scientific information on some 4300 native taxa, including descriptions, maps, images, conservation status, nomenclatural details together with names used by various aboriginal groups. Alien taxa are also recorded (over 470 species). Users can access fact sheets on species and some details of the specimens held in the Northern Territory Herbarium, (herbaria codes, NT, DNA) together with keys, and some regional factsheets.

The conservation act for NT flora (and fauna) is the Territory Parks and Wildlife Conservation Act 1976 or TWPCA, and it uses the IUCN criteria and categories. In the distribution guides FloraNT uses the IBRA version 5.1 botanical regions.

== Herbaria ==
The Northern Territory Department of Environment and Natural Resources is responsible for the Northern Territory Herbarium which has two sites and two Index Herbariorum codes: DNA in Palmerston and NT in Alice Springs.

== See also ==
- List of electronic Floras
