= Stan Woodell =

British botanist

Stanley Reginald John Woodell (1928 – 24 April 2004) was a British botanist and plant ecologist who lectured at the University of Oxford for nearly three decades.

== Early life and education ==
Woodell was born in Shepherd's Bush, London. He studied botany at Durham University, where he was a member of Hatfield College. As an undergraduate, he was involved with the Durham University Exploration Society. He remained at Durham for doctoral research into seed incompatibility in the genus Primula, receiving his PhD in 1958.

== Career and research ==
Woodell was a King George VI Fellow at North Carolina State University (1956–57). He was a lecturer in botany at Oxford University from 1959 until 1988. He became a Governing Body Fellow of Wolfson College, Oxford in 1967, serving until 1988, and was subsequently a supernumerary fellow in 1988–89 and an emeritus fellow from 1989 until his death in 2004. He also served as the college's fellow librarian from 1984 to 2004.

Woodell collaborated with the ecologist John Proctor on the study of serpentine soils. In 1975, they published an extensive review, "The Ecology of Serpentine Soils", which remained an influential and frequently cited work in the field decades after its initial publication.

He co-wrote the Flora of Oxfordshire published in 1998, to which his fellow botanist and colleague Humphry Bowen contributed.

He continued working on the ecology and reproductive biology of primroses later in his career, and material he had assembled before his death was incorporated into posthumously published accounts of Primula elatior and Primula vulgaris in the Journal of Ecology.

== Personal life ==
Woodell was married to Rebecca Glass, a fellow naturalist he met while in North Carolina. He began collecting books as a student at Durham and for many years ran an antiquarian book catalogue business alongside his academic duties.

He died on 24 April 2004 after a period of ill-health.

== Selected publications ==
=== Book ===
- Killick, John; Perry, Roy; Woodell, Stan (1998). The Flora of Oxfordshire. Newbury: Pisces Publications. ISBN 9781874357070.

=== Journal articles ===
- Proctor, John; Woodell, Stanley R. J. (1975). "The ecology of serpentine soils". Advances in Ecological Research. 9: 255–366. doi:10.1016/S0065-2504(08)60291-3.
- Taylor, Kenneth; Woodell, Stanley R. J. (2008). "Biological Flora of the British Isles: Primula elatior (L.) Hill". Journal of Ecology. 96 (5): 1098–1116. doi:10.1111/j.1365-2745.2008.01418.x.
