= List of electronic Floras =

This list of electronic Floras is arranged by country within continent. An electronic Flora is an online resource which provides descriptions of the associated plants, often also providing identification keys, or partial identification keys, to the plants described. Some Floras point to the literature associated with the plants of the region (flora Malesiana), others seek to show the plants of a region using images (flora of India), others give an inventory of the region's plants (flora of Pakistan).

Countries with sites listing both flora and fauna have also been included, since the sites provide a useful resource for those seeking to use a Flora.

== World (families/genera) ==
- Wattles Worldwide Wattle.
- Pl@ntNet – plant database, species identifications, observations, photograph, citizen science project

== Africa ==
- Base de données des plantes d'Afrique. CJB Conservatoire et Jardin botaniques de la Ville de Genève.

=== Botswana ===
- Flora of Botswana

=== Egypt ===
- Common Plants of Western Desert of Egypt

=== Eswatini ===
- Eswatini's Flora Database Eswatini National Trust Commission

=== Madagascar ===
- Madagascar Catalogue of Vascular Plants

=== Malawi ===
- Flora of Malawi

=== Morocco ===
- Flore du Maroc (only Pteridophytes, Gymnosperms and families from Acanthaceae to Asteraceae)
- Plant biodiversity of South-Western Morocco

=== Mozambique ===
- Flora of Mozambique

=== Namibia ===
- Flora of Caprivi (Namibia)

=== South Africa ===
- PlantZAfrica.com: Plants of South Africa

=== Zambia ===
- Flora of Zambia

=== Zimbabwe ===
- Flora of Zimbabwe

== Asia ==
=== China ===
- Flora of China
- Moss Flora of China

=== Cyprus ===
- Flora of Cyprus

=== India ===
- eFlora of India
- E-Flora of Kerala

=== Iran ===
- Flora of Iran

=== Israel ===
- Wild Flowers of Israel
- Flora of Israel and adjacent area

=== Japan ===
- Database of Japanese Flora

=== Malesia ===
- FLORA MALESIANA Naming, Describing And Inventorying The Flora Of Malesia

=== Mongolia ===
- FloraGREIF, the Virtual Guide to the Flora of Mongolia

=== Nepal ===
- Flora of Nepal
- Annotated checklist of the flowering plants of Nepal

=== Pakistan ===
- Flora of Pakistan

=== Philippines ===
- Co's Digital Flora of the Philippines

=== Qatar ===
- Flora of Qatar

=== Thailand ===
- BKF e-Flora of Thailand

=== UAE ===
- UAE Flora (The Plant Database of Emirates)

== Caribbean ==
=== Saint Lucia ===
- Plants of Saint Lucia

== Europe ==
=== France ===
- INPN Inventaire National du Patrimoine Naturel (France and overseas territories - fauna and flora)

=== Greece ===
- Cretan Flora
- Greek Flora
- Vascular Plants Checklist of Greece (checklist, photo and distribution atlas)

=== Italy ===
- Acta Plantarum - Flora delle Regioni italiane
- Flora Italiana
- Portal to the Flora of Italy

=== Portugal ===
- Flora.on

=== United Kingdom ===
- Atlas of the British and Irish flora
- Flora of Northern Ireland

== North America ==
=== United States ===
- Jepson eflora:The Jepson Herbarium University of California, Berkeley
- Illinois Plants
- New York Flora Atlas, New York Flora Association
- Flora of Missouri
- Flora of North Dakota checklist
- Flora of North America. Tropicos
- Online Virtual Flora of Wisconsin
- Michigan Flora Online

=== Nicaragua ===
- Flora de Nicaragua

== Oceania ==
=== Australia ===
- Flora of Australia (current site) or FoAO2 (in wikidata)
- PlantNet: New South Wales Flora online, National Herbarium of New South Wales, Royal Botanic Gardens Sydney.
  - eFlora: Vascular Plants of the Sydney Region - The University of Sydney
- FloraNT: Northern Territory flora online, Northern Territory Government
- VicFlora: Flora of Victoria, Royal Botanic Gardens Foundation Victoria
- eFloraSA: Electronic Flora of South Australia, Government of South Australia
- Flora of Tasmania online: an eFlora for the State of Tasmania
- FloraBase: The Western Australian Flora. Western Australian Herbarium, Biodiversity and Conservation Science, Department of Biodiversity, Conservation and Attractions.
- Australian Tropical Rainforest Plants (WP article)

=== New Caledonia ===
- Faune et Flore de la Nouvelle Caledonie

=== New Guinea ===
- Plants of Papua New Guinea

=== New Zealand ===
- NZ Flora: The definitive reference to New Zealand plants

== South America ==
=== Argentina ===
- Flora Argentina

=== Chile ===
- Flora of Chile
- ChileFlora Your window to the world of Chilean plants

=== Ecuador ===
- Trees and shrubs of the Andes of Ecuador

=== Brazil ===
- Flora do Brasil 2020 Algae, Fungi, Plants (This resource is close in concept to the Australasian Virtual Herbarium: with collections data available for download, but searches on specific names reveal full descriptions)
- CNCFlora (Centro Nacional de Conservação da Flora). This is a national resource for generating, coordinating and disseminating information on biodiversity and conservation of endangered Brazilian flora. Produces a Red List based on IUCN criteria and categories.
