= Humphry Bowen =

British botanist and chemist

Humphry John Moule Bowen
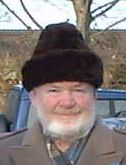
- Humphry Bowen in 1999
- Born: 22 June 1929; Oxford, England
- Died: 9 August 2001 (aged 72); Dorset, England
- Education: Magdalen College, Oxford
- Known for: Study of trace elements, Bowen's Kale, two English county floras (Berkshire and Dorset)
- Scientific career
- Fields: Analytical chemistry, botany
- Workplaces: Atomic Energy Research Establishment; University of Reading

Humphry John Moule Bowen (22 June 1929 – 9 August 2001) was a British botanist and chemist.

== Early life and education ==
Bowen was born in Oxford, son of the chemist Edmund Bowen and Edith Bowen (nee Moule). He attended the Dragon School, gaining a scholarship to Rugby School and then a demyship to Magdalen College, Oxford. He won the Gibbs Prize in 1949 and completed a DPhil in chemistry at Oxford University in 1953 before starting his professional career as a chemist. Bowen was also a proficient amateur actor in his early years, appearing with a young Ronnie Barker at Oxford.

== Research career ==
His first post was with the Atomic Energy Research Establishment (AERE) near the village of Harwell where he lived, working at the Wantage Research Laboratory, then in Berkshire. His early work started an interest in radioisotopes and trace elements that he maintained throughout his working life. While at AERE, he spent several months in 1956 attending the British nuclear tests at Maralinga in Australia to study the environmental effects of radiation.

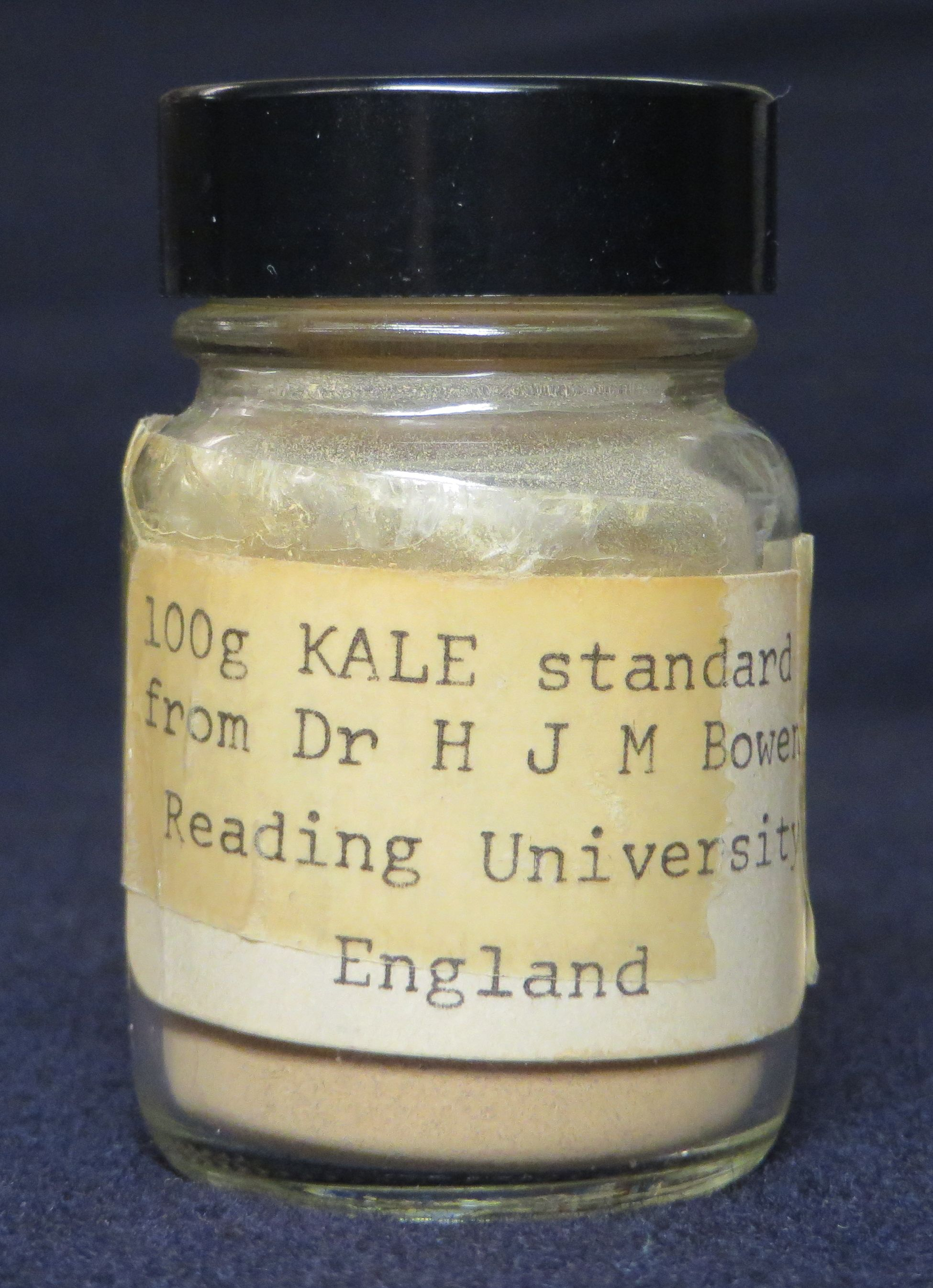
A jar of the botanical reference material Bowen's Kale, in the collection of the Museum of the History of Science, University of Oxford, England.

Bowen realized that the calibration of different instruments intended to measure trace elements was an important issue that needed addressing. His solution was to produce a good supply of a material which later become known as Bowen's Kale. This was a dried, crushed chomogenate of the plant kale, that was stable and consistent enough to be distributed as a research calibration standard - probably the first successful example of such a standard.

In 1964, he was appointed as a lecturer in the chemistry department at the University of Reading. Later he was promoted to Reader in analytical chemistry in 1974. At Reading, Bowen undertook consultancy for Dunlop, investigating potential uses for their products. When the Torrey Canyon oil disaster occurred in 1967, he realized that it might be possible to use foam booms to block the oil from spreading in the English Channel. His original experiments were conducted in a small bucket in his laboratory. Although not entirely successful in reality at the time due to the rough seas, this lateral thinking combined his interest in chemistry with his love of nature and has since been effectively deployed to protect ports and harbours against encroaching oil slicks. Bowen wrote a number of professional books in the field of chemistry, including two editions of Trace elements in Biochemistry (1966 and 1976).

In 1968, Bowen noted that the paint used for yellow line road markings can contain chromate pigment, which may cause urban pollution as it deteriorates. He pointed out that hexavalent chromium in dust can cause dermatitis ulceration on the skin, inflammation of the nasal mucosa and larynx, and lung cancer.

From 1951 onwards, Bowen was a long-serving member of the Botanical Society of the British Isles (BSBI). He was meetings secretary for a period and the official recorder of plants for the counties of Berkshire and Dorset, producing Floras for both counties. He retired to Winterborne Kingston in Dorset at the end of his life. He was also one of the leading contributors of botanical data for the Flora of Oxfordshire. He acted as an expert botanical guide on tours around Europe, especially Greece and Turkey.

Humphry Bowen donated a large collection of lichens from Berkshire and Oxfordshire to the Museum of Reading in the 1970s. He established the Bowen Cup at the University of Reading in 1988, an annual prize for the student in the Department of Chemistry at the University who achieves the top marks in Part II Analytical Chemistry.

== See also ==
- Bowen's son, Jonathan Bowen, a computer scientist.
- George Claridge Druce, the Victorian botanist who also wrote floras for more than one county.
- Tottles.

== Bibliography ==
- H. J. M. Bowen, Trace Elements in Biochemistry. Academic Press, 1966.
- H. J. M. Bowen, Properties of Solids and their Structures. McGraw-Hill, 1967.
- H. J. M. Bowen, Environmental Chemistry of the Elements. Academic Press, 1979. ISBN 0-12-120450-2.
