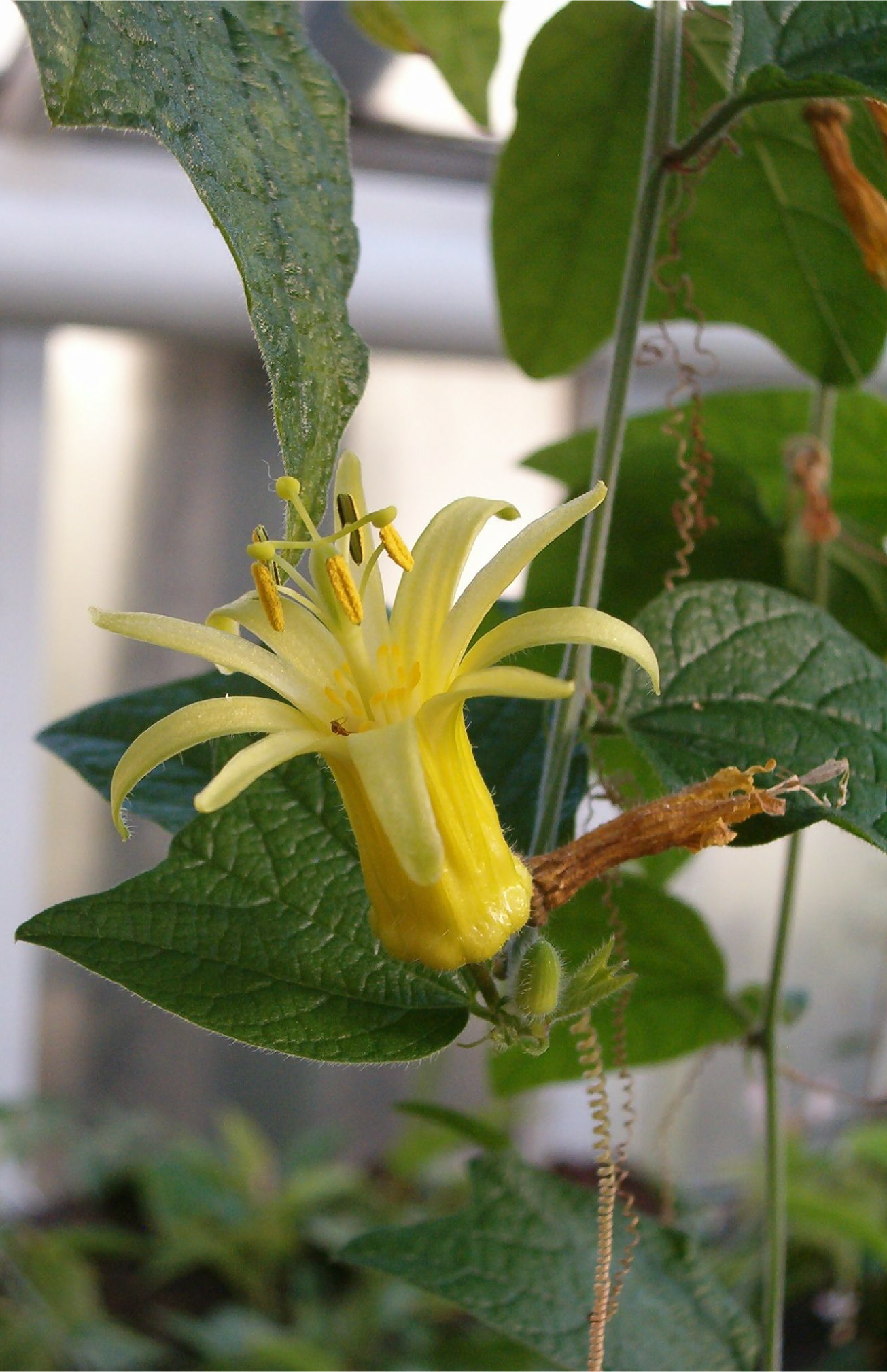

Scientific classification
- Kingdom: Plantae
- Clade: Tracheophytes
- Clade: Angiosperms
- Clade: Eudicots
- Clade: Rosids
- Order: Malpighiales
- Family: Passifloraceae
- Genus: Passiflora
- Species: P. citrina

Binomial name
- Passiflora citrina J.M.MacDougal

= Passiflora citrina =

Species of vine

Passiflora citrina is a species of passion flower (Passiflora) native to Central America. It is also grown as an ornamental plant. If grown outdoors it will make an edible red fruit used in desserts.

== Gallery ==
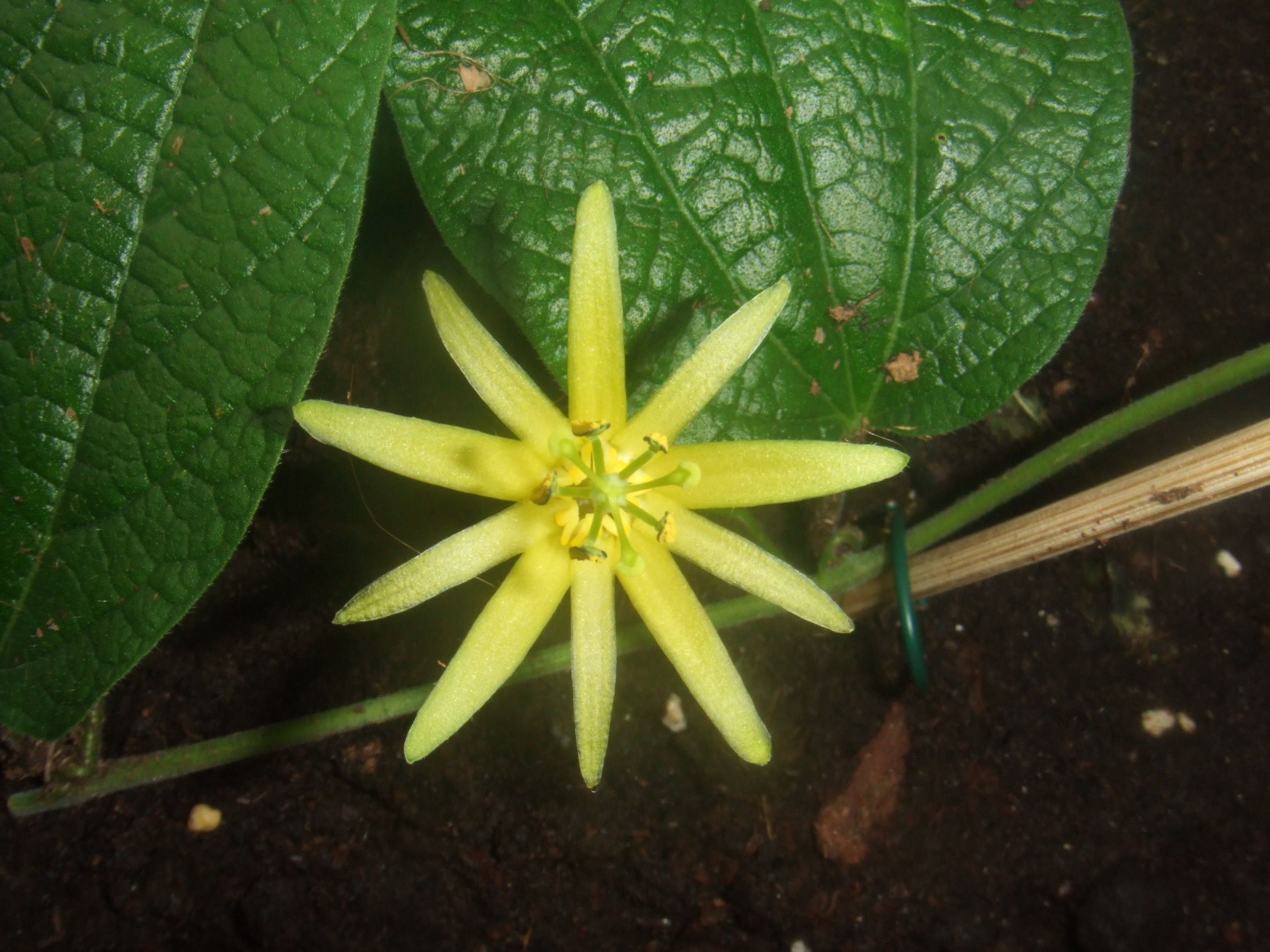
Flower

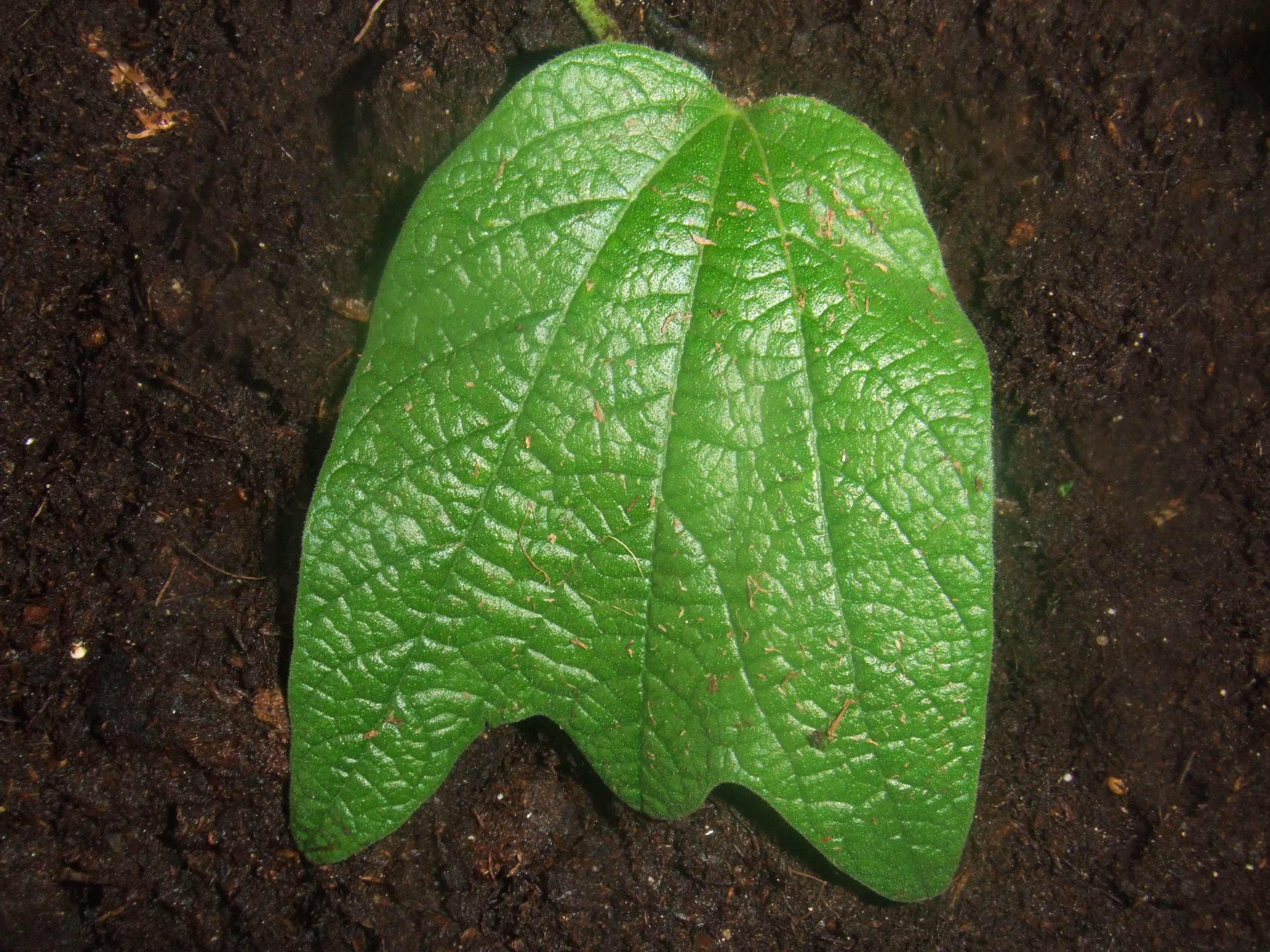
Leaf
