= Flora of Thailand =

Flora of Thailand is a multi-volume flora describing the vascular plants of Thailand, published by the Forest Herbarium, Royal Forest Department since the 1970s. It currently consists of 12 volumes.

== Volumes ==
- Volume 1 – not yet published
- Volume 2(1-4) – Actinidiaceae, Apostasiaceae, Balanophoraceae, Bonnetiaceae, Cannabidaceae, Cardiopteridaceae, Casuarinaceae, Centrolepidaceae, Cephalotaxaceae, Connaraceae, Cupressaceae, Cycadaceae, Dilleniaceae, Ebenaceae, Elaeocarpaceae, Flagellariaceae, Gnetaceae, Goodeniaceae, Haloragaceae, Hanguanaceae, Hippocastanaceae, Icacinaceae, Illliciaceae, Irvingiaceae, Juncaceae, Lowiaceae, Magnoliaceae, Nyssaceae, Ochnaceae, Oxalidaceae, Pinaceae, Podocarpaceae, Portulacaceae, Rafflesiaceae, Restionaceae, Rhizophoraceae, Rosaceae, Saurauiaceae, Schisandraceae, Simaroubaceae, Smilacaceae, Sphenocleaceae, Stylidiaceae, Symplocaceae, Theaceae, Triuridaceae.
- Volume 3(1) (1979) – Psilotaceae, Lycopodiaceae, Selaginellaceae, Isoetaceae, Equisetaceae, Ophioglossaceae, Marattiaceae, Osmundaceae, Plagiogyriaceae, Gleicheniaceae, Schizaeaceae, Hymenophyllaceae, Cyatheaceae, Dicksoniaceae, Dennstaedtiaceae.
- Volume 3(2) (1985) - Lindsaeaceae, Davalliaceae, Oleandraceae, Parkeriaceae, Vittariaceae, Pteridaceae, Aspleniaceae.
- Volume 3(3) (1988) - Blechnaceae, Lomariopsidaceae, Dryopteridaceae, Thelypteridaceae, Athyriaceae.
- Volume 3(4) (1989) - Dipteridaceae, Cheiropleuriaceae, Polypodiaceae, Grammitidaceae, Marsileaceae, Salviniaceae, Azollaceae.
- Volume 4(1) (1984) - Leguminosae - Caesalpinioideae.
- Volume 4(2) (1985) - Leguminosae - Mimosoideae.
- Volume 5(1) (1987) – Aristolochiaceae, Bignoniaceae, Droseraceae, Epacridaceae, Gentianaceae, Opiliaceae, Philydraceae, Proteaceae, Salicaceae, Thismiaceae, Valerianaceae, Xyridaceae.
- Volume 5(2) (1990) - Scrophulariaceae.
- Volume 5(3) (1991) - Bretschneideraceae, Capparaceae, Malpighiaceae, Menispermaceae, Nyctaginaceae.
- Volume 5(4) (1992) - Amaranthaceae, Basellaceae, Caryophyllaceae, Chloranthaceae, Crypteroniaceae, Phytolaccaceae, Sonneratiacea, Umbelliferae
- Volume 6(1) (1993) - Taccaceae, Tiliaceae.
- Volume 6(2) (1996) - Myrsinaceae.
- Volume 6(3) (1997) - Cruciferae, Hugoniaceae, Ixonanthaceae, Linaceae, Loganiaceae, Thymelaeaceae.
- Volume 6(4) (1998) - Cyperaceae.
- Volume 7(1) (1999) - Apocynaceae, Primulaceae, Sapindaceae.
- Volume 7(2) (2000) - Callitrichaceae, Chenopodiaceae, Hydrophyllaceae, Monotropaceae, Myricaceae, Oleaceae, Salvadoraceae, Saururaceae, Zygophyllaceae.
- Volume 7(3) (2001) - Alismataceae, Aponogetonaceae, Ctenolophonaceae, Cymodoceaceae, Hamamelidaceae, Hydrocharitaceae, Lemnaceae, Limnocharitaceae, Melastomataceae, Polygalaceae, Potamogetonaceae, Sterculiaceae.
- Volume 7(4) (2002) - Buddlejaceae, Hydrangeaceae, Loranthaceae, Myristicaceae, Myrtaceae, Saxifragaceae, Viscaceae.
- Volume 8(1) (2005) - Euphorbiaceae (A-F).
- Volume 8(2) (2007) - Euphorbiaceae (G-Z).
- Volume 9(1) (2005) - Aizoaceae, Aralidiaceae, Bombacaceae, Datiscaceae, Iteaceae, Lardizabalaceae, Molluginaceae, Petrosaviaceae, Pontederiaceae, Santalaceae, Sarcospermataceae.
- Volume 9(2) (2008) - Cannaceae, Caricaceae, Carlemanniaceae, Costaceae, Cunoniaceae, Heliconiaceae, Hemerocallidaceae, Iridaceae, Lomandraceae, Marantaceae, Orobanchaceae, Plagiopteraceae, Plantaginaceae, Sabiaceae, Strelitziaceae, Typhaceae.
- Volume 9(3) (2008) - Fagaceae.
- Volume 9(4) (2008) - Cucurbitaceae.
- Volume 10(1) (2009) - Dioscoreaceae.
- Volume 10(2) (2010) - Celastraceae, Hernandiaceae, Leeaceae, Mastixiaceae, Passifloraceae, Verbenaceae.
- Volume 10(3) (2010) - Anacardiaceae, Convolvulaceae.
- Volume 10(4) (2011) - Cecropiaceae, Moraceae.
- Volume 11(1) (2011) - Cornaceae, Daphniphyllaceae, Erythroxylaceae, Helwingiaceae, Lentibulariaceae, Monimiaceae, Ranunculaceae, Stemonaceae.
- Volume 11(2) (2012) - Araceae, Acoraceae.
- Volume 11(3) (2013) - Arecaceae (Palmae).
- Volume 11(4) (2014) - Campanulaceae, Elatinaceae, Lythraceae, Onagraceae, Ruppiaceae, Sapotaceae & Staphyleaceae.
- Volume 12(1) (2011) - Orchidaceae 1 (Cypripedioideae, Orchidoideae, Vanilloideae).
- Volume 12(2) (2014) - Orchidaceae 2 (Epidendroideae P.P.: Neottieae, Tropideae, Nervilieae, Gastrodieae, Thaieae, Calypsoeae, Arethuseae, Collabieae, Cymbidieae).
- Volume 13(1) (2015) - Achariaceae, Adoxaceae, Cannabaceae, Caprifoliaceae, Ericaceae, Salicaceae, Ulmaceae
- Volume 13(2) (2016) - Compositae (Asteraceae)
- Volume 13(3) (2017) - Dipsacaceae, Eriocaulaceae, Juglandaceae, Melanthiaceae, Oleaceae (Myxopyreae), Plumbaginaceae, Polyosmaceae, Sapindaceae (Hippocastanoideae)
- Volume 13(4) (2017) - Dipterocarpaceae
- Volume 14(1) (2018) - Betulaceae, Buxaceae, Cornaceae (Part 2), Dichapetalaceae, Gelsemiaceae, Moringaceae, Olacaceae, Podostemaceae, Polygonaceae & Violaceae
- Volume 14(2) (2019) - Araliaceae, Berberidaceae, Cabombaceae, Ceratophyllaceae, Malvaceae (Malvoideae), Styracaceae & Thymelaeaceae (Part 2)
- Volume 14(3) (2020) - Begoniaceae, Calophyllaceae, Elaeagnaceae, Hypericaceae, Lophopyxidaceae, Martyniaceae, Papaveraceae & Passifloraceae (Part 2)
- Volume 14(4) (2021) - Ancistrocladaceae, Lecythidaceae, Nelumbonaceae, Nymphaeaceae, Rhamnaceae, & Vitaceae

== Meetings ==
- 12th Flora of Thailand Meeting (2002) - Bangkok, Thailand.
- 13th Flora of Thailand Meeting (2005) - Dublin, Ireland.
- 14th Flora of Thailand Meeting (2008) - Copenhagen, Denmark.
- 15th Flora of Thailand Meeting (2011) - Chiang Mai, Thailand.
- Flora of Thailand Meeting (2014) - Kew Gardens, United Kingdom
- 17th Flora of Thailand Conference (21-25 August 2017) - Deevana Plaza, Ao-nang, Krabi, Thailand.

== See also ==
- Flora of Thailand — wikipedia articles category.
- Flore du Cambodge, du Laos et du Viêtnam
- Flora Malesiana
