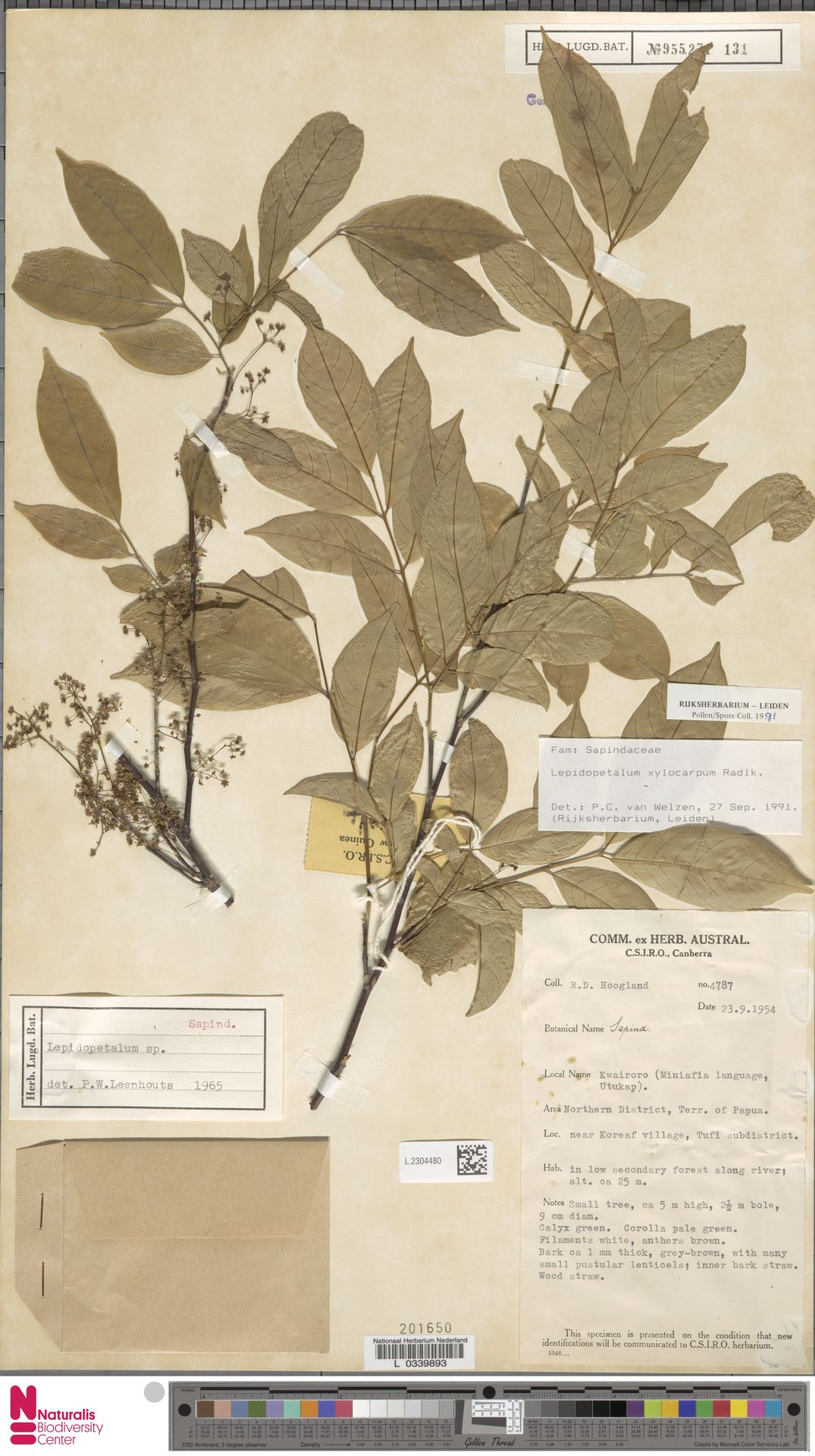

Scientific classification
- Kingdom: Plantae
- Clade: Tracheophytes
- Clade: Angiosperms
- Clade: Eudicots
- Clade: Rosids
- Order: Sapindales
- Family: Sapindaceae
- Genus: Lepidopetalum
- Species: L. xylocarpum

Binomial name
- Lepidopetalum xylocarpum Radlk.

= Lepidopetalum xylocarpum =

Species of plant

Lepidopetalum xylocarpum is a species of plant of the family Sapindaceae. It was first described by Ludwig Adolph Timotheus Radlkofer in 1890. This species is found in the New Guinea and the Solomon Islands.
