= Trace element =

Element of low concentration

A trace element is a chemical element of a minute quantity, a trace amount, especially used in referring to a micronutrient, but is also used to refer to minor elements in the composition of a rock, or other chemical substance.

In nutrition, trace elements are classified into two groups: essential trace elements, and non-essential trace elements. Essential trace elements are needed for many physiological and biochemical processes in both plants and animals. Not only do trace elements play a role in biological processes but they also serve as catalysts to engage in redox – oxidation and reduction mechanisms. Trace elements of some heavy metals have a biological role as essential micronutrients.

== Types ==
The two types of trace element in biochemistry are classed as essential or non-essential.

=== Essential trace elements ===
An essential trace element is a dietary element, a mineral that is only needed in minute quantities for the proper growth, development, and physiology of the organism. The essential trace elements are those that are required to perform vital metabolic activities in organisms. Essential trace elements in human nutrition, and other animals include iron (Fe) (hemoglobin), copper (Cu) (respiratory pigments), cobalt (Co) (Vitamin B12), iodine (I), manganese (Mn), chlorine (Cl), molybdenum (Mo), selenium (Se) and zinc (Zn) (enzymes). Although they are essential, they become toxic at high concentrations.

=== Non-essential trace elements ===
Non-essential trace elements include silver (Ag), cadmium (Cd), mercury (Hg), and lead (Pb). They have no known biological function in mammals, with toxic effects even at low concentration.

The structural components of cells and tissues that are required in the diet in gram quantities daily are known as bulk elements.

== See also ==
- Antinutrient
- Bowen's Kale
- Geotraces
- List of micronutrients
- Trace metal
