= Flora Mesoamericana =

1994 text

- Genre: Botany
- Publisher: Universidad Nacional Autónoma de México, Missouri Botanical Garden Press, and the Natural History Museum (London)
- Publication date: 1995
- ISBN: 978-9-683-64700-9

Flora Mesoamericana is a comprehensive catalog (a flora) of southern Mexican and Central American plants, written in Spanish.

The first volume was published in 1994. It is a collaboration between the Missouri Botanical Garden, the National Autonomous University of Mexico, and the Natural History Museum London.
