= Alan S. Weakley =

Botanist

Alan Stuart Weakley
- Born: February 19, 1957; Montgomery County, Maryland, United States
- Education: University of North Carolina at Chapel Hill (B.A.), Duke University (Ph.D.)
- Scientific career
- Workplaces: North Carolina Department of Natural Resources, The Nature Conservancy, NatureServe, University of North Carolina at Chapel Hill, University of North Carolina Herbarium
- Thesis: Change over time in our understanding of the flora of the southeastern United States: implications for plant systematic, bioinformatics, and conservation (2005)
- Author abbrev. (botany): Weakley

Alan Stuart Weakley (born 1957) is an American botanist with expertise in the systematics, ecology, and conservation of the flora of the Southeastern United States. Weakley is the director of the UNC Herbarium at the North Carolina Botanical Garden and an adjunct associate professor at the University of North Carolina at Chapel Hill. He is the author of Flora of the Southern & Mid-Atlantic States, a manual covering the approximately 7000 vascular plants found in the Southeastern United States.

As of August 2025, the International Plant Names Index lists 84 names published by Weakley.

The standard author abbreviation Weakley is used to indicate this person as the author when citing a botanical name.
