= John M. MacDougal =

American botanist (born 1954)

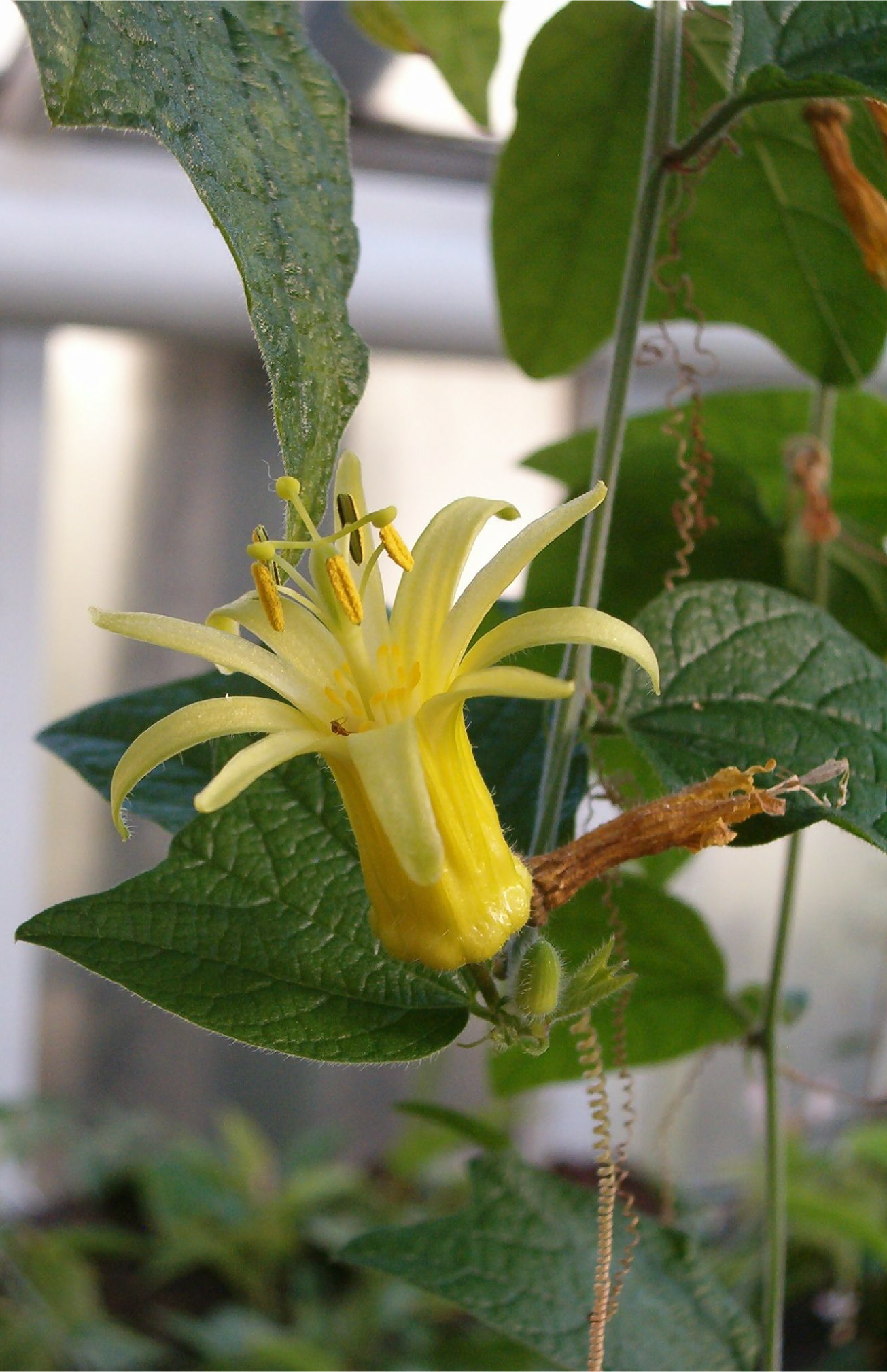
Passiflora citrina, a species described by MacDougal

John Mochrie MacDougal (born 1954) is an American botanist, noted for his work on the taxonomy of passion flowers, having discovered several new species.

He earned his Bachelor of Science in 1975 at College of Charleston. In 1984 he earned his doctorate at Duke University.

Between 1984 and 1986 he was visiting assistant professor of biology at the North Carolina Agricultural and Technical State University. Between 1987 and 1989 he was postdoctoral researcher at the Flora Mesoamerica project at the Missouri Botanical Garden in St. Louis, Missouri. Between 1990 and 2002 he was conservatory manager at the Missouri Botanical Garden.

MacDougal has written more than fifty peer reviewed articles and book chapters. Currently, he is an assistant professor of biology at Harris–Stowe State University.

James Mallet and Sandra Knapp have named Passiflora macdougaliana after him.
