= Flora Malesiana =

Flora Malesiana is a multi-volume flora describing the vascular plants of Malesia (the biogeographical region consisting of Indonesia, Malaysia, Singapore, Brunei, the Philippines, and Papua New Guinea), published by the National Herbarium of the Netherlands since 1950. It currently consists of 204 full treatments, covering about 20% of a total of approximately 40,000 species.

== Main series ==
Flora Malesiana is divided into two main series: I. Seed plants and II. Pteridophytes. Later volumes include CD-ROMs with additional multimedia content such as interactive keys.

=== Series I. Seed Plants ===
Currently, the following volumes have been published in Series I. Seed Plants:

- Volume 1 – Malesian Plant Collectors
- Volume 2 & 3 – not published.
- Volume 4 (1954) – Revisions: Aceraceae, Actinidiaceae sens.str., Aizoaceae, Amaranthaceae, Ancistrocladaceae, Aponogetonaceae, Bixaceae sens.str., Burmanniaceae, Callitrichaceae, Cannabinaceae, Caprifoliaceae, Ceratophyllaceae, Chenopodiaceae, Cochlospermaceae, Combretaceae, Convolvulaceae, Corynocarpaae, Crassulaceae, Datiscaceae, Dilleniaceae, Dioscoreaceae, Dipsacaceae, Droseraceae, Elatinaceae, Ficoidaceae see Aizoaceae, Flagellariaceae, Gnetaceae, Gonystylaceae, Hydrocaryaceae, Hydrophyllaceae, Juncaceae, Juncaginaceae, Martyniaceae see Pedaliaceae, Molluginaceae see Aizoaceae, Moringaceae, Myoporaceae, Myricaceae, Nyssaceae, Pedaliaceae, Pentaphragmataceae, Philydraceae, Phytolaccaceae, Plumbaginaceae, Podostemaceae, Polemoniaceae, Pontederiaceae, Punicaceae, Salvadoraceae, Sarcospermaceae, Saururaceae, Sonneratiaceae, Sparganiaceae, Sphenocleaceae, Stackhousiaceae, Stylidiaceae, Styracaceae, Thymelaeaceae–Gonystyloideae, Trapaceae see Hydrocaryaceae, Trigoniaceae, Tumeraceae, Typhaceae, Umbelliferae, Valerianaceae, Xyridaceae, Zygophyllaceae.
- Volume 5 (1958) – Revisions: Alismataceae, Basellaceae, Batidaceae, Betulaceae, Burseraceae, Butomaceae, Centrolepidaceae, Connaraceae, Dichapetalaceae, Erythroxylaceae, Flacourtiaceae, Goodeniaceae, Haemodoraceae, Hamamelidaceae, Hydrocharitaceae, Malpighiaceae, Papaveraceae, Pentaphylacaceae, Pittosporaceae, Proteaceae, Restionaceae, Rhizophoraceae, Salicaceae, Scyphostegiaceae.
- Volume 6 (1972) – Revisions: Campanulaceae, Capparidaceae, Celastraceae, Epacridaceae, Ericaceae, Gerianiaceae, Juglandaceae, Loganiaceae, Najadaceae, Nyctaginaceae, Primulaceae, Simaroubaceae, Staphyleaceae, Thymelaeaceae.
- Volume 7 part 1 (1971) – Revisions: Byblidaceae, Cardiopteridaceae, Clethraceae, Haloragaceae, Icacinaceae, Lemnaceae, Lophopyxidaceae, Ochnaceae, Oxalidaceae, Portulacaceae, Violaceae.
- Volume 7 part 2 (1972) – Revisions: Fagaceae, Passifloraceae.
- Volume 7 part 3 (1974) – Revision: Cyperaceae.
- Volume 7 part 4 (1976) – Revisions: Balanophoraceae, Leeaceae, Taccaceae.
- Volume 8 part 1 (1974) – Revision: Hypericaceae.
- Volume 8 part 2 (1977) – Revisions: Bignoniaceae, Cornaceae, Crypteroniaceae, Iridaceae, Lentibulariaceae, Onagraceae, Symplocaceae, Ulmaceae.
- Volume 8 part 3 (1978) – Revisions: Anacardiaceae, Labiatae.
- Volume 9 part 1 (1979) – Revisions: Araliaceae-I, Liliaceae s.s.
- Volume 9 part 2 (1982) – Revisions: Cyperaceae-II, Liliaceae-I
- Volume 9 part 3 (1983) – Revision: Dipterocarpaceae
- Volume 10 part 1 (1984) – Revisions: Aristolochiaceae, Olacaceae, Opiliaceae, Triuridaceae.
- Volume 10 part 2 (1986) – Revisions: Alseuosmiaceae, Chloranthaceae, Elaeagnaceae, Menispermaceae, Monimiaceae, Sphenostemonaceae, Trimeniaceae.
- Volume 10 part 3 (1988) – Revisions: Araucariaceae, Coniferales, Cruciferae, Ctenolophonaceae, Cupressaceae, Ixonanthaceae, Linaceae, Magnoliaceae, Pinaceae, Podocarpaceae, Polygalaceae, Sabiaceae, Taxaceae.
- Volume 10 part 4 (1989) – Revisions: Chrysobalanaceae, Sabiaceae.
- Volume 11 part 1 (1992) – Revision: Mimosaceae (Leguminosae–Mimosoideae).
- Volume 11 part 2 (1993) – Revisions: Alliaceae, Amaryllidaceae, Coriariaceae, Pentastemonaceae, Rosaceae, Stemonaceae.
- Volume 11 part 3 (1994) – Revision: Sapindaceae.
- Volume 12 part 1 (1995) – Revision: Meliaceae.
- Volume 12 part 2 (1996) – Revisions: Caesalpiniaceae, Geitonoplesiaceae, Hernandiaceae, Lowiaceae.
- Volume 13 (1997) – Revisions: Boraginaceae, Daphniphyllaceae, Illiciaceae, Loranthaceae, Rafflesiaceae, Schisandraceae, Viscaceae.
- Volume 14 (2000) – Revision: Myristicaceae.
- Volume 15 (2001) – Revision: Nepenthaceae.
- Volume 16 (2002) – Revisions: Caryophyllaceae, Cunoniaceae, Potamogetonaceae, Zosteraceae, Cymodoceaceae.
- Volume 17 part 1 (2006) – Revisions: Moraceae – genera other than Ficus.
- Volume 17 part 2 (2005) – Revisions: Moraceae – Ficus.
- Volume 18 (2007) – Apocynaceae
- Volume 19 (2010) – Cucurbitaceae
- Volume 20 (2011) – Acoraceae, Pandaceae, Picrodendraceae

=== Series II. Pteridophytes ===
Series II. Pteridophytes consists of:

- Volume 1 part 1 (1959) – Revisions: Gleicheniaceae, Schizaeaceae, Isoetaceae
- Volume 1 part 2 (1963) – Revision: Cyatheaceae
- Volume 1 part 3 (1971) – Revision: Lindsaea group
- Volume 1 part 4 (1978) – Revision: Lomariopsis group.
- Volume 1 part 5 (1981) – Revision: Thelypteridaceae.
- Volume 2 part 1 (1991) – Revision: Tectaria group.
- Volume 3 (1998) – Revisions: Polypodiaceae, Davalliaceae, Azollaceae, Cheiropleuriaceae, Equisetaceae, Matoniaceae, Plagiogyriaceae.

== CD-ROMs ==
Several taxonomic treatments have been published by ETI Bioinformatics on CD-ROM. These treatments have various multimedia features such as interactive keys, many images, and literature databases. Currently, the following treatments have been published on CD-ROM:

- Leguminosae – Caesalpinioideae of South East Asia
- Leguminosae – Mimosoideae of South-East Asia
- Orchids of New Guinea Vol. I – Illustrated Checklist and Genera
- Orchids of New Guinea Vol. II – Dendrobium and allied genera
- Orchids of New Guinea Vol. III – Genera Acanthephippium to Hymenorchis (excluding Dendrobiinae s.l.)
- Orchids of New Guinea Vol. IV – Genera Kuhlhasseltia to Ophioglossella
- Orchids of New Guinea Vol. V – Genera Pachystoma to Zeuxine (excluding Dendrobiinae s.l.)
- Orchids of New Guinea Vol. VI – Genus Bulbophyllum
- Orchids of The Philippines Vol. I – Illustrated Checklist and Genera

== Digitalization ==
In 2010 an initiative was taken to make all of the contents of Flora Malesiana available though a website, as a so-called e-flora (the 'e' standing for 'electronic' or 'enhanced'). This initiative was taken because (1) the overall progress of Flora Malesiana in terms of the number of species covered is too slow (about 80% of all species in Malesia still need to be treated) to make a timely contribution towards sustainability and conservation, and (2) several volumes of Flora Malesiana are out-of-print.

== Meetings ==
- 1st International Flora Malesiana Symposium (1989) - Leiden, The Netherlands
- 2nd International Flora Malesiana Symposium (1992) - Yogyakarta, Indonesia
- 3rd International Flora Malesiana Symposium (1995) - Royal Botanic Gardens, Kew, London, United Kingdom
- 4th International Flora Malesiana Symposium (1998) - Forest Research Institute, Kuala Lumpur, Malaysia
- 5th International Flora Malesiana Symposium (2001) - Sydney, Australia
- 6th International Flora Malesiana Symposium (2004) - UPLB, Philippines
- 7th International Flora Malesiana Symposium (2007) - Leiden, the Netherlands
- 8th International Flora Malesiana Symposium (2010) - Singapore Botanic Gardens, Singapore.
- 9th International Flora Malesiana Symposium (2013) - Herbarium Bogoriense, Indonesia
- 10th International Flora Malesiana Symposium (2016) - Edinburgh Botanic Gardens, UK
- 11th International Flora Malesiana Symposium (2019) - Universiti Brunei Darussalam, Brunei

== See also ==
- Cornelis Gijsbert Gerrit Jan van Steenis
- Flora of Thailand
- Flore du Cambodge, du Laos et du Viêtnam
