= Russell R. Kirt Prairie =

Restored prairie in Illinois

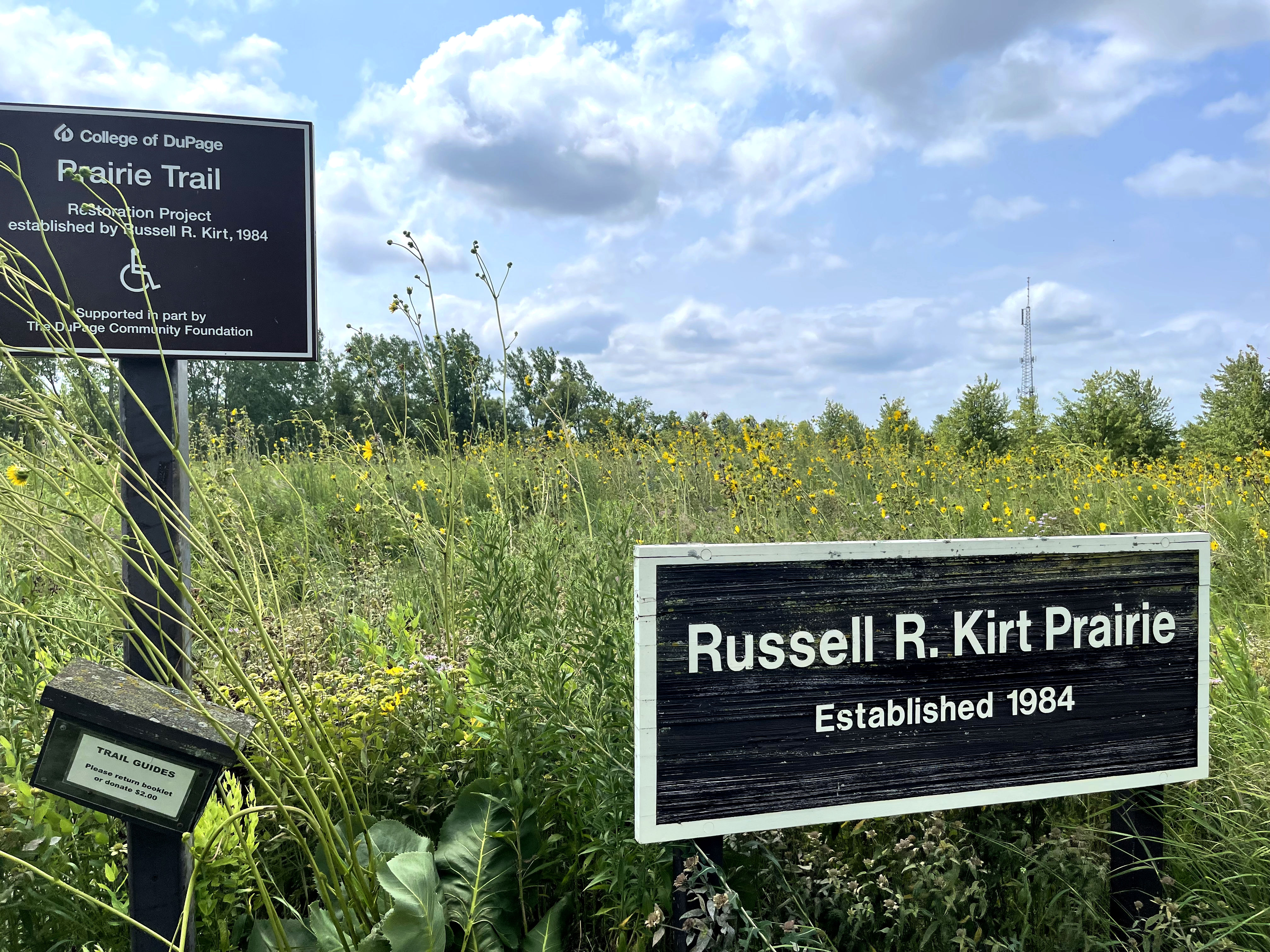

- Location within Illinois
- Location: Glen Ellyn, Illinois
- Coordinates: 41°50′24″N 88°04′33″W
- Area: 18 acres (7.3 ha)
- Established: 1984
- Named for: Russell R. Kirt
- Operator: College of DuPage
- Website: cod.edu/natural-areas

Russell R. Kirt Prairie is a restored tallgrass prairie and savanna within the College of DuPage Natural Areas. A Trail Guide published by the college provides background information and ecological notes. In addition to the mesic prairie and oak savanna, the site also includes a small hill prairie, swale, marsh and wetland areas.

Professor Russell R. Kirt states on the back cover of his book Prairie Plants of the Midwest: Identification and Ecology that he "began restoring prairie in 1974, two years after Ray Schulenberg of the Morton Arboretum introduced him to the prairie". In 1981 he started the restoration project by obtaining grant money from the college's Board Of Trustees, and began collecting native seeds and seedlings from sites within a 40-km radius of the college to ensure local genotypes. In 1984, he reestablished a former farmland and parking lot at the college to prairie with the help of numerous volunteers, including students. The restoration used two methods, either seed broadcast or seedling transplant. Whenever possible, species associations as described by Swink and Wilhelm were planted together.

He monitored the site for at least 16 years, and published his findings at the North American Prairie Conference. After 16 years, the Floristic Quality Index (Index Value in Professor Kirt's papers) in areas restored by either method reached about 30, with no significant difference between the two.

The college Board Of Trustees designated the site as West Prairie-Marsh Nature Preserve in December 1993, and renamed it Russell R. Kirt Prairie in November 1999.

The prairie is located less than 100 meters from the college's Health and Science Center, making it the only sizable restored prairie in the U.S. that is within walking distance of a college classroom building, and it is often used for field study by biology, botany, and environmental science classes. The college offers a Prairie Ecology class that focuses on the tallgrass prairie ecosystem, with extensive hands-on studies in the prairie. Other disciplines that make use of the prairie resource include earth science, art, and photography.

Trail Guide

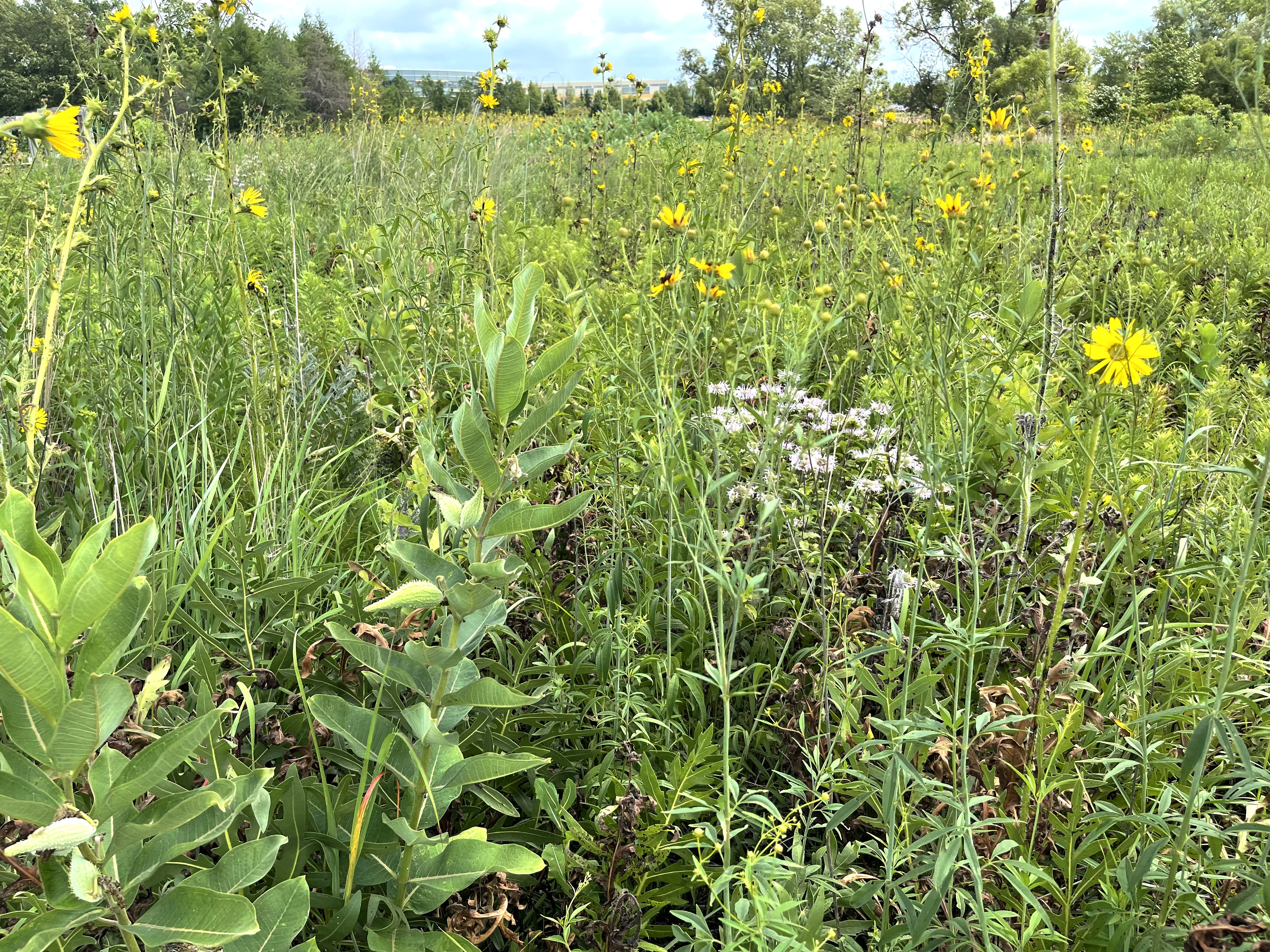
The prairie in July

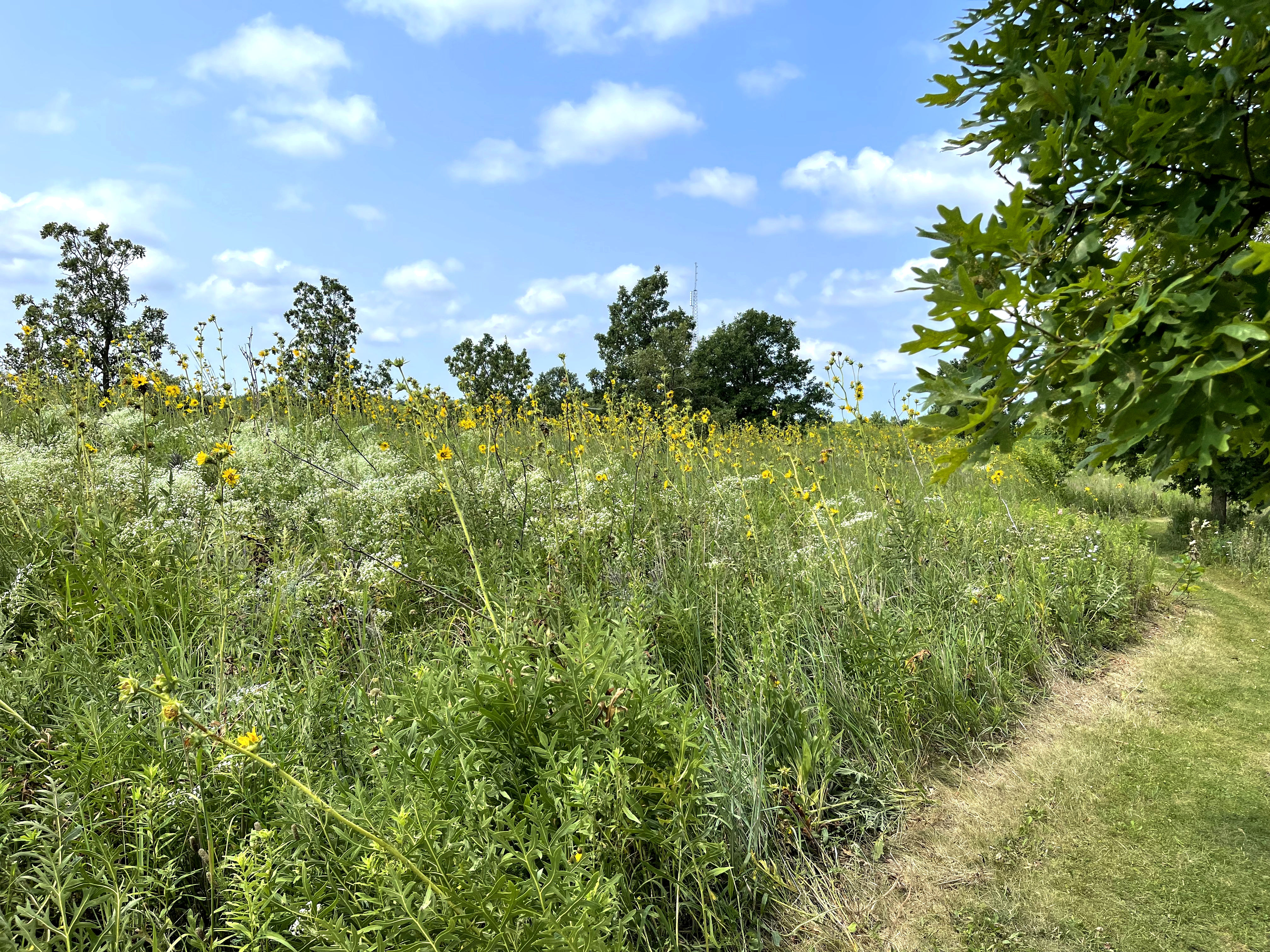
Trail along the savanna

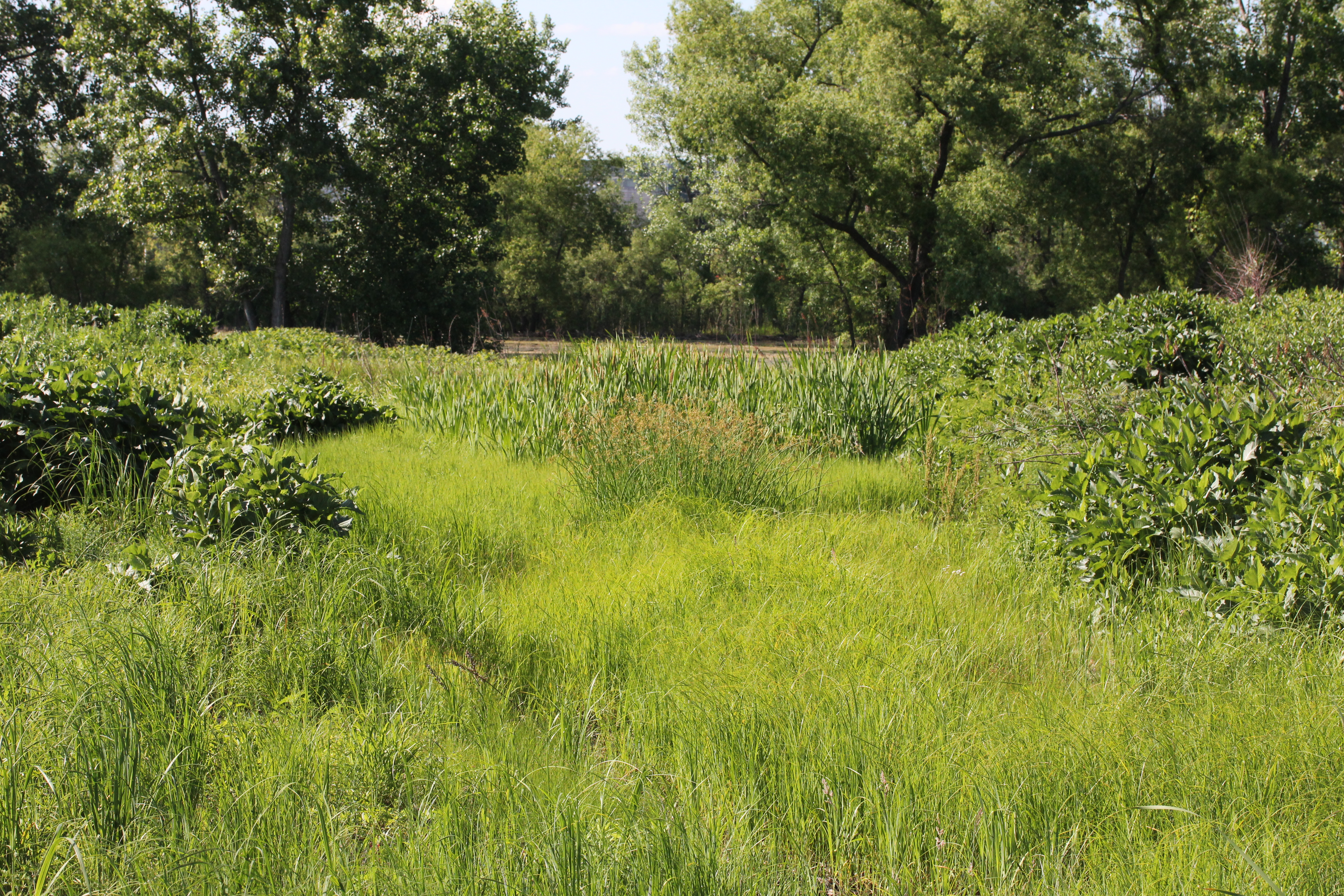
Swale and marsh area

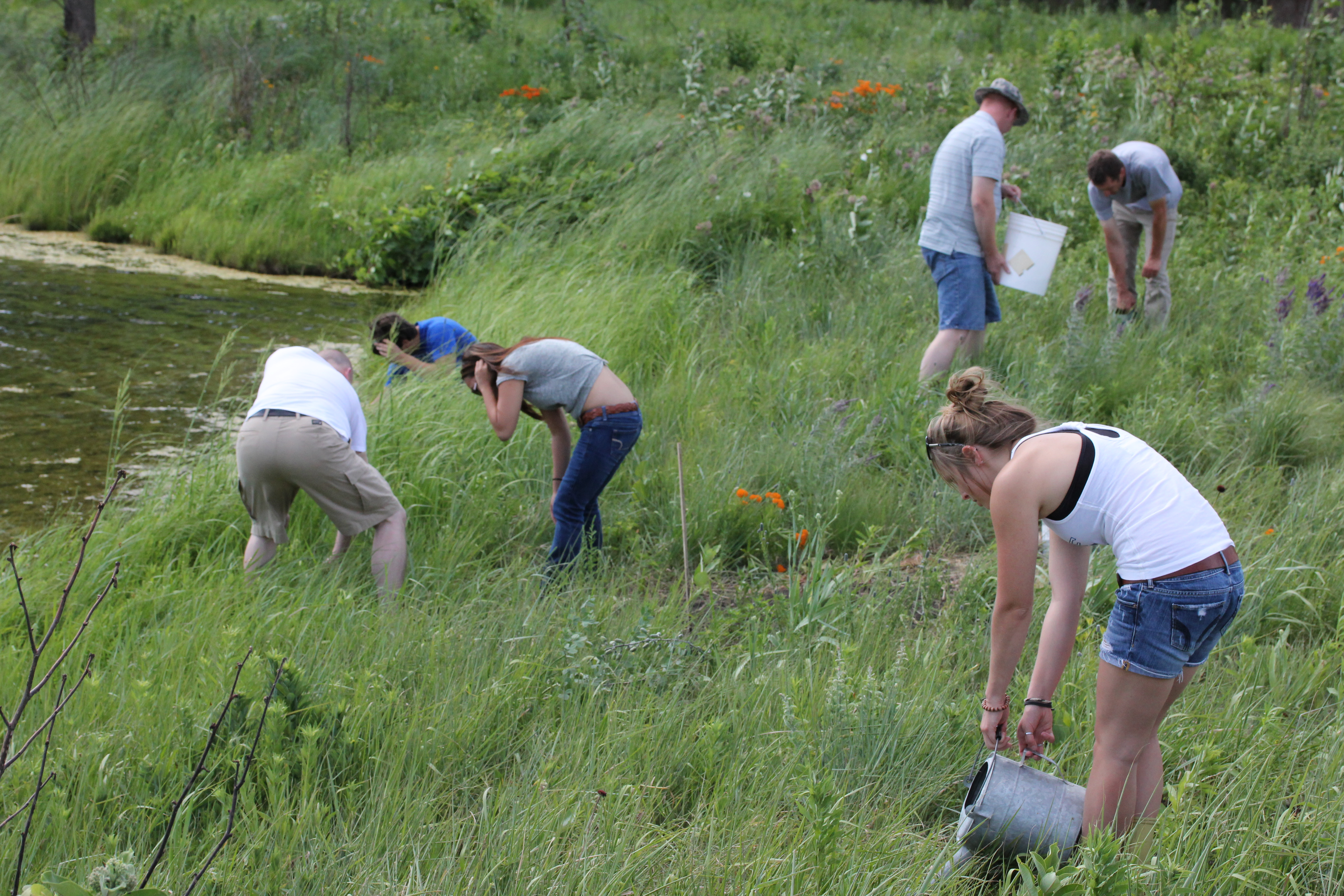
Prairie Ecology class

== Management ==
Prescribed burns are conducted in the spring and the fall to control weeds and to restore the natural area. In addition, many volunteers are needed to help in hand weeding of invasive plants, seed collection and processing, brush cutting and clearing, and trash removal.

Seeds collected from the prairie are traded with other restoration projects in the region.

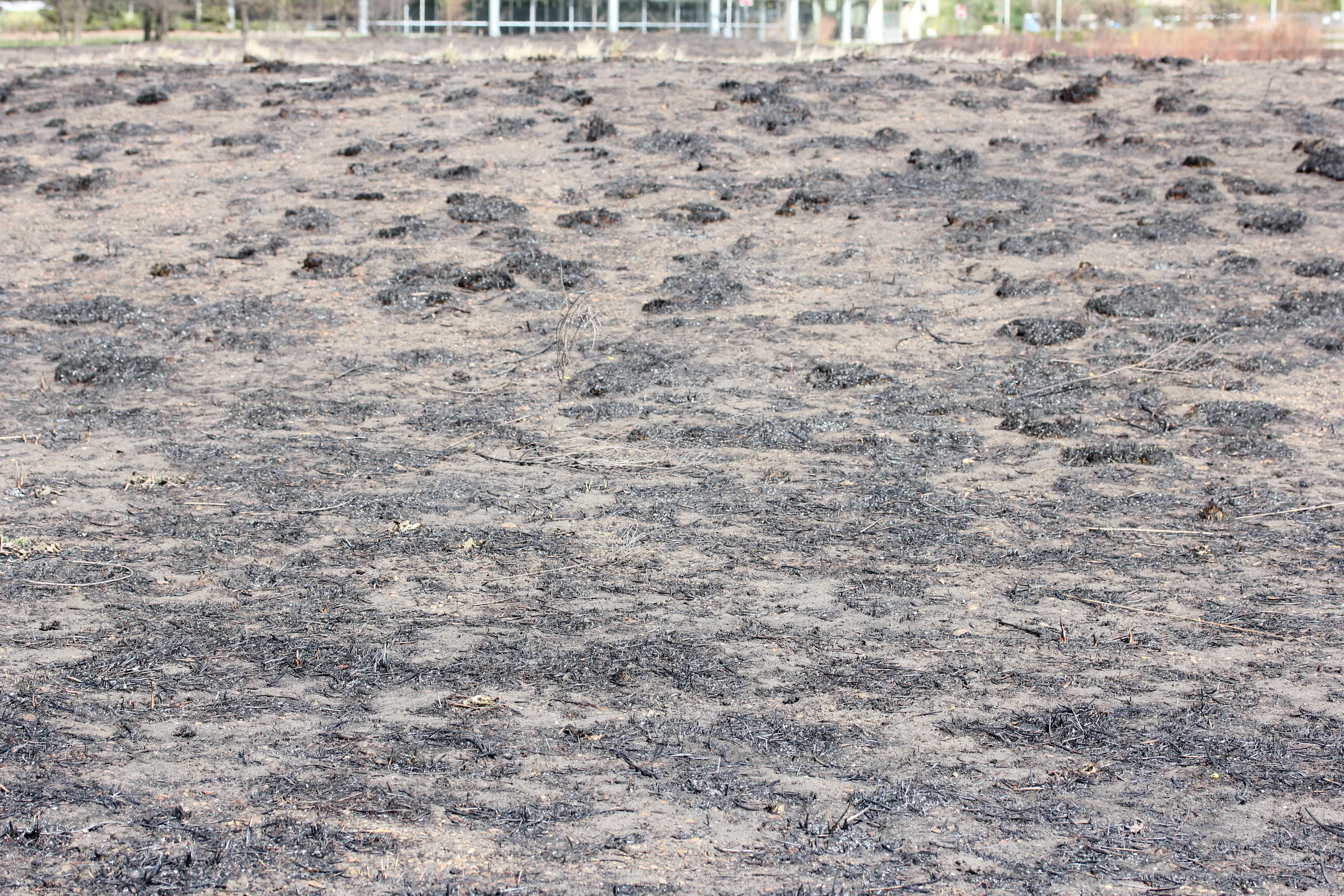
After a burn in April

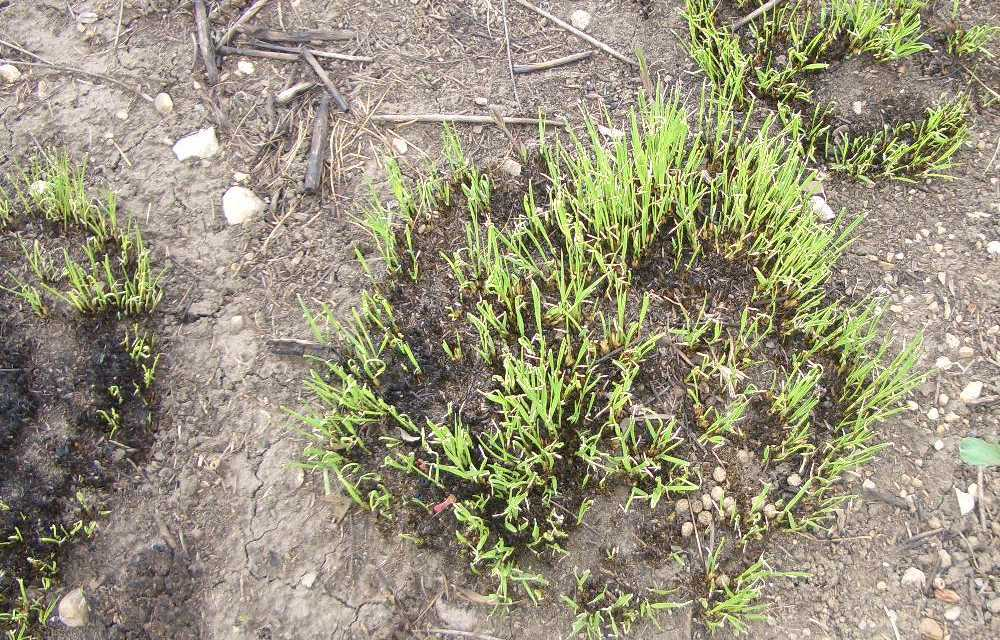
Prairie Dropseed emerging after a burn in April

== Species diversity ==
The number of plant species identified by Professor Kirt in his studies included 293 native and introduced species. Each species is associated with a coefficient of conservatism (or C value in Professor Kirt's papers) that enable ecologists to determine the Floristic Quality Index (FQI, or Index Value) of an ecosystem. As of 1999 the FQI of the prairie was about 30.

The plant species are classified into 31 plant families. The three most prominent families are Poaceae (grasses), Fabaceae (legumes), and Asteraceae (composites).

Detailed flowering dates of forbs and grasses growing at the prairie can be found in a phenological chart in Professor Kirt's book and also in the Trail Guide.

Rare species that can be found at the prairie include the federally endangered Dalea foliosa (Leafy Prairie Clover) and the Illinois endangered Nycticorax nycticorax (Black-crowned Night Heron).

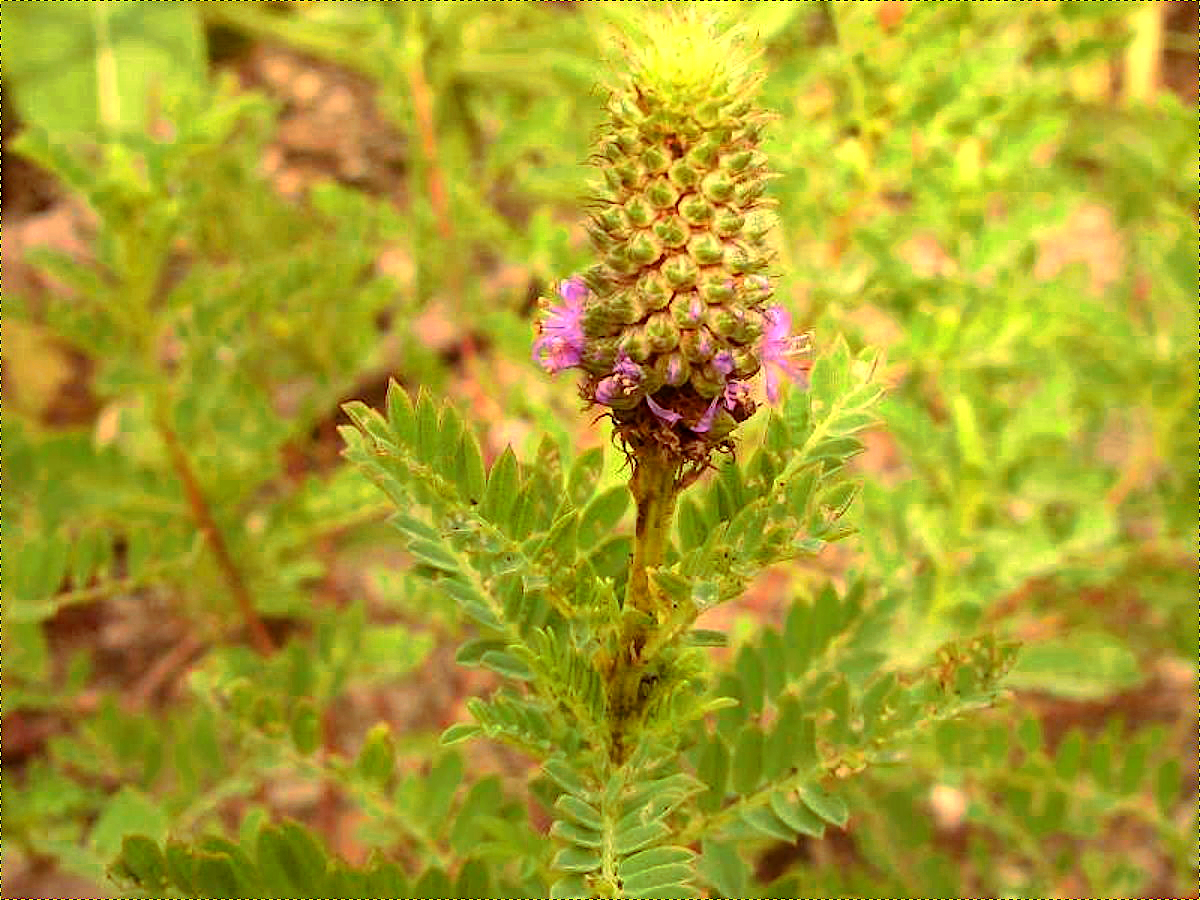
Dalea foliosa

== Ecology ==
Many ecological studies have been conducted at the prairie by college faculty and others. Target species that have been studied include small mammals such as white-footed mouse, ants, and baptisia seed pod weevil.

Many citizen scientists have used the prairie and surrounding natural areas as a monitoring site for birds, frogs, butterflies, dragonflies, etc. The diversity of flora and fauna at the site is documented at the citizen science portals eBird as a "hotspot" and at iNaturalist as a "place" as well as a "project".

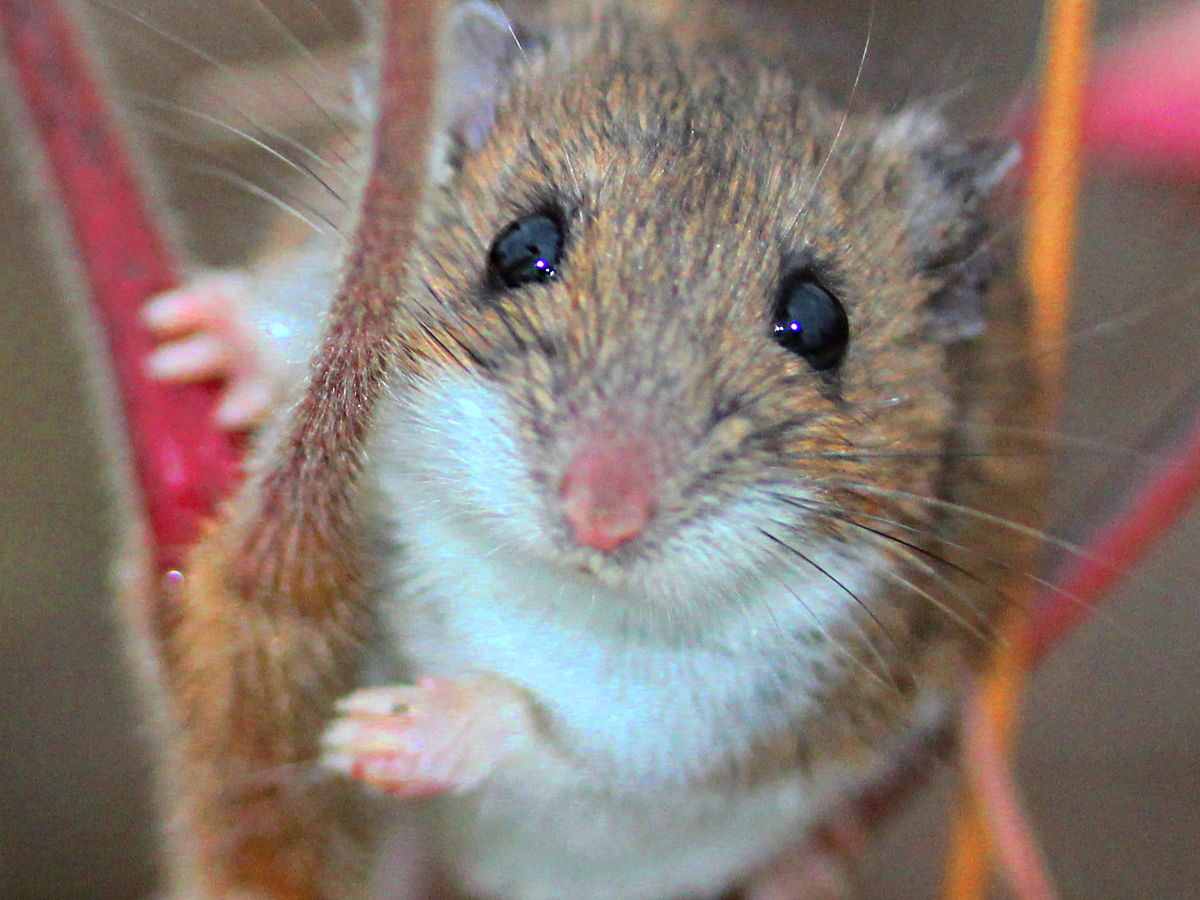
white-footed mouse

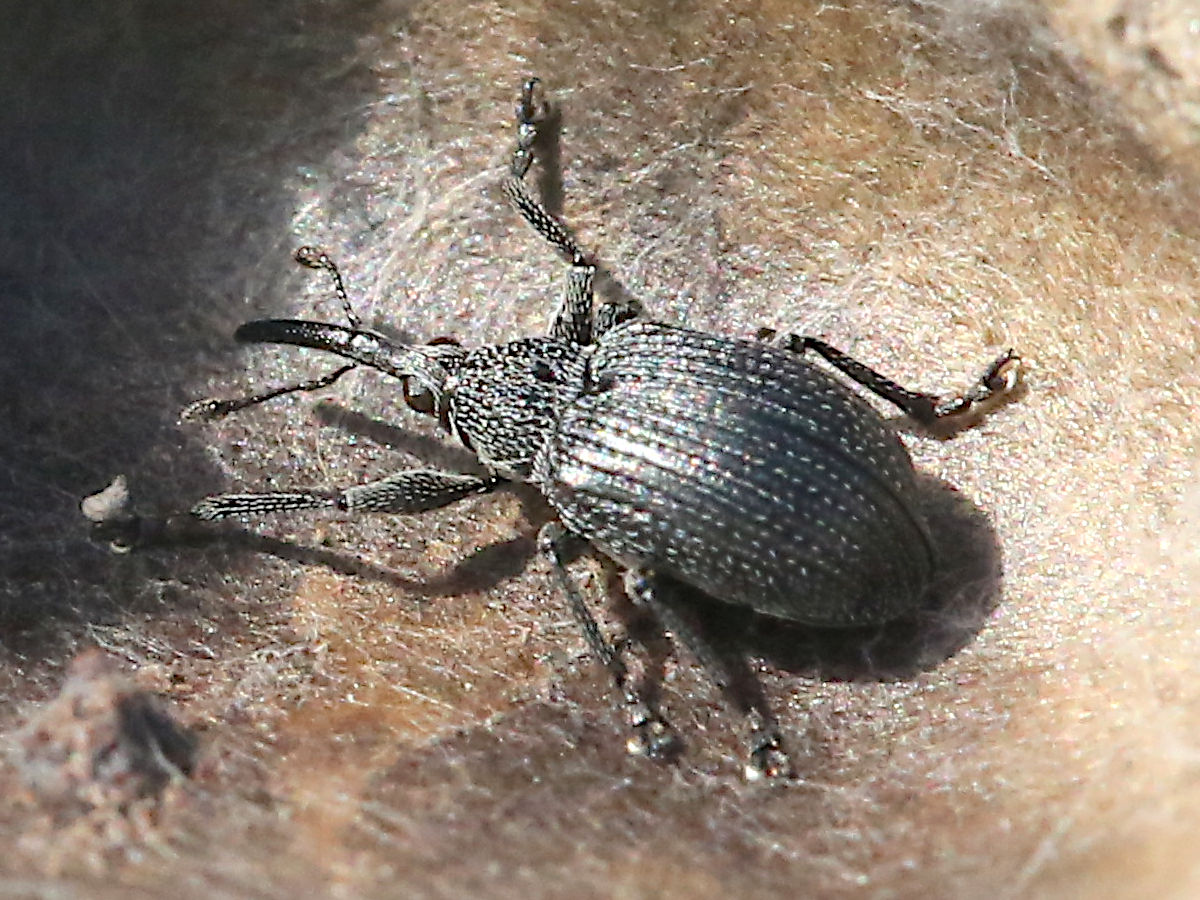
baptisia seed pod weevil

== Community education ==
Since 2016, a full-time prairie manager oversees overall management of the prairie, and also coordinates community education and outreach programs. Guided tours and work days are available to students for service-learning opportunities as well as to the general public.

A meeting point for Prairie tours is the Community Education Fuel Garden where students learn sustainable agriculture.

In 2017, the college installed two honey bee beehives in partnership with The Honeybee Conservancy and Kline Creek Farm to provide pollination and to serve as a learning lab for students and the community.

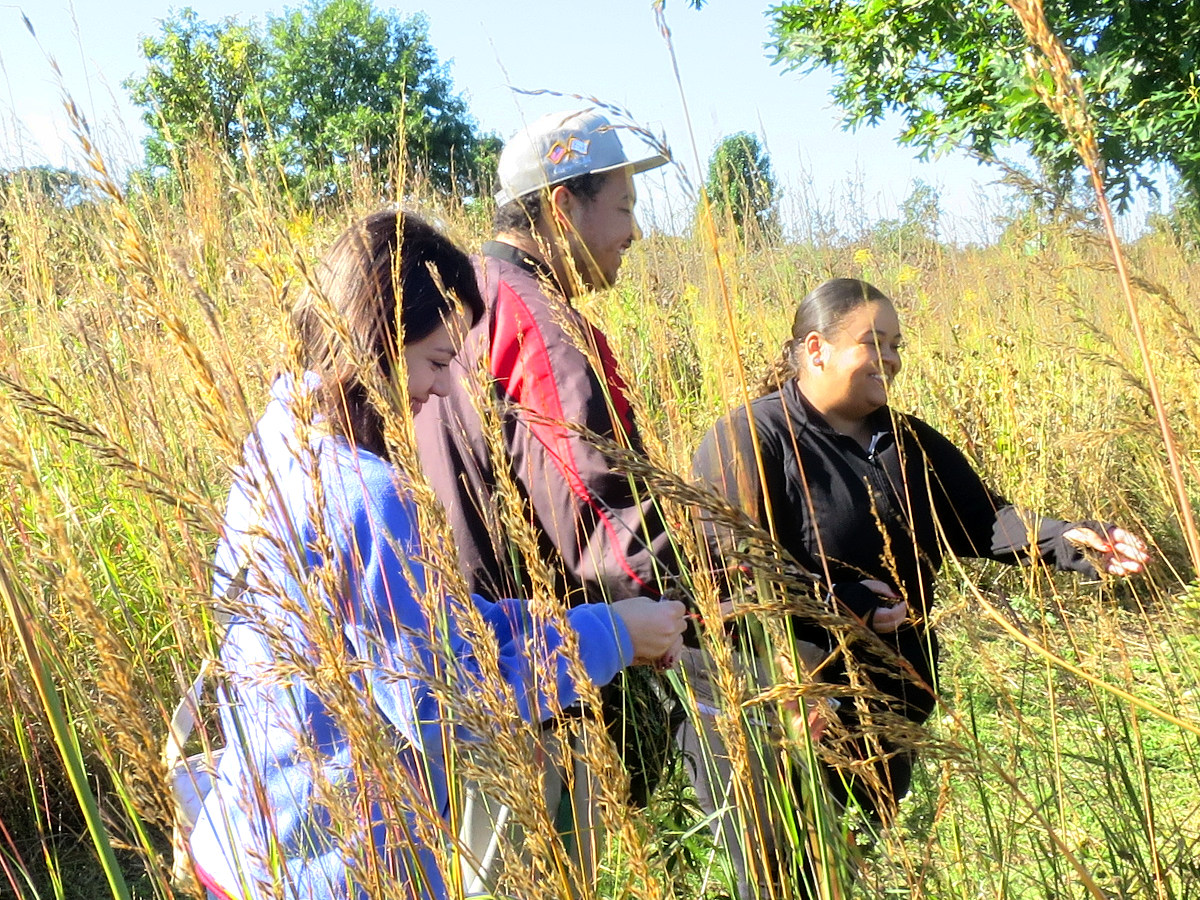
Collecting seeds for service-learning

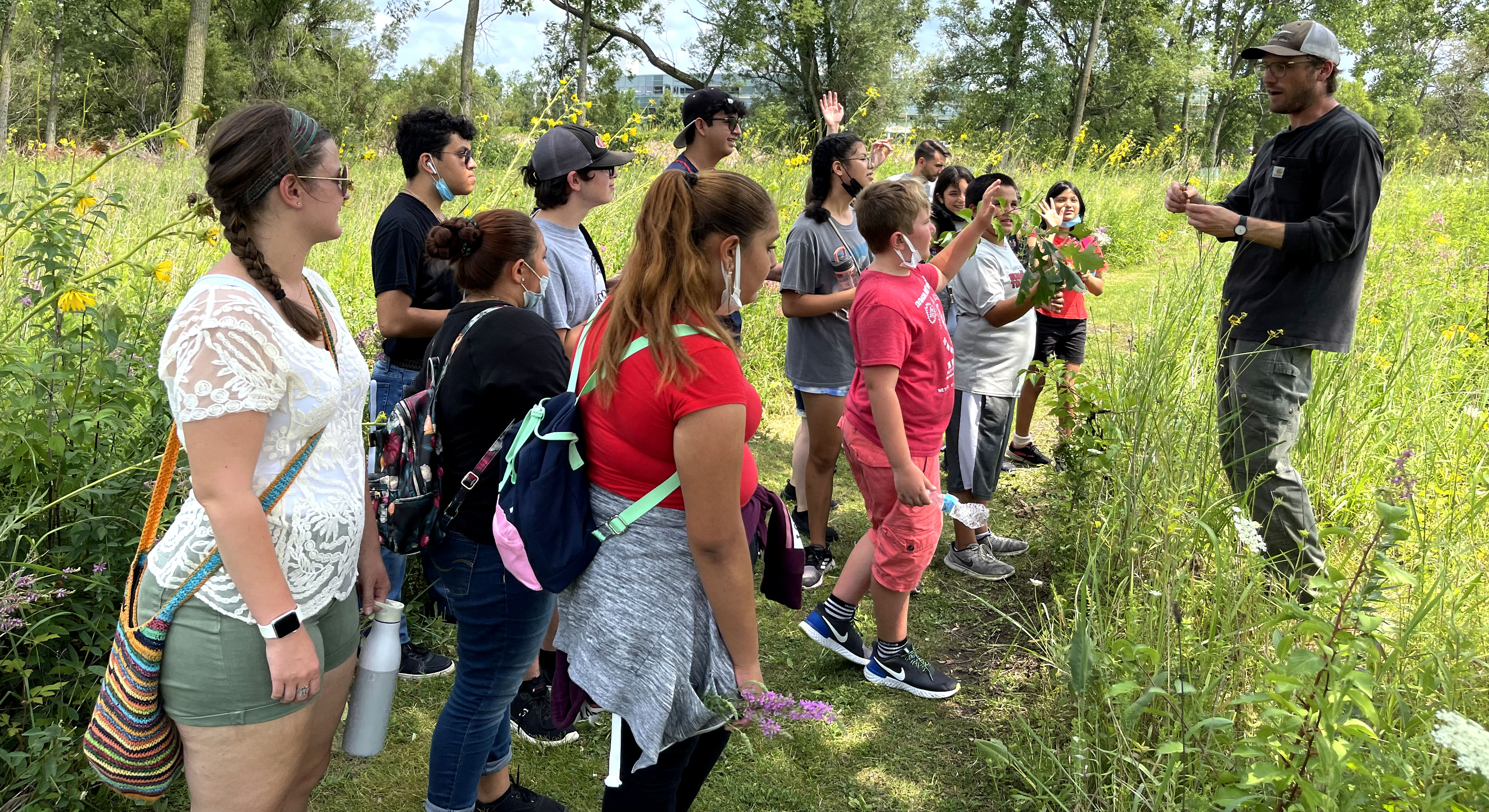
A guided tour

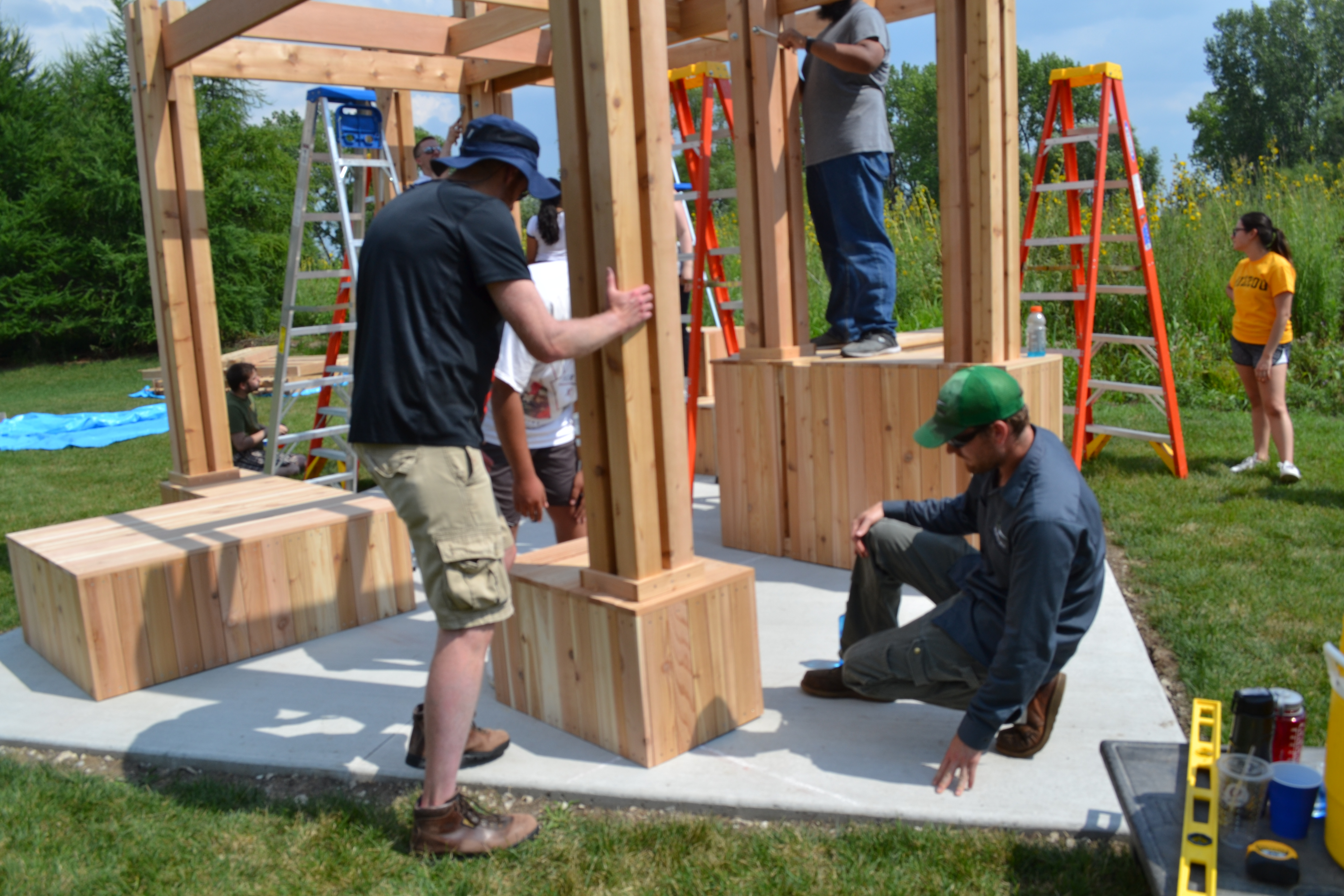
Community Education Fuel Garden

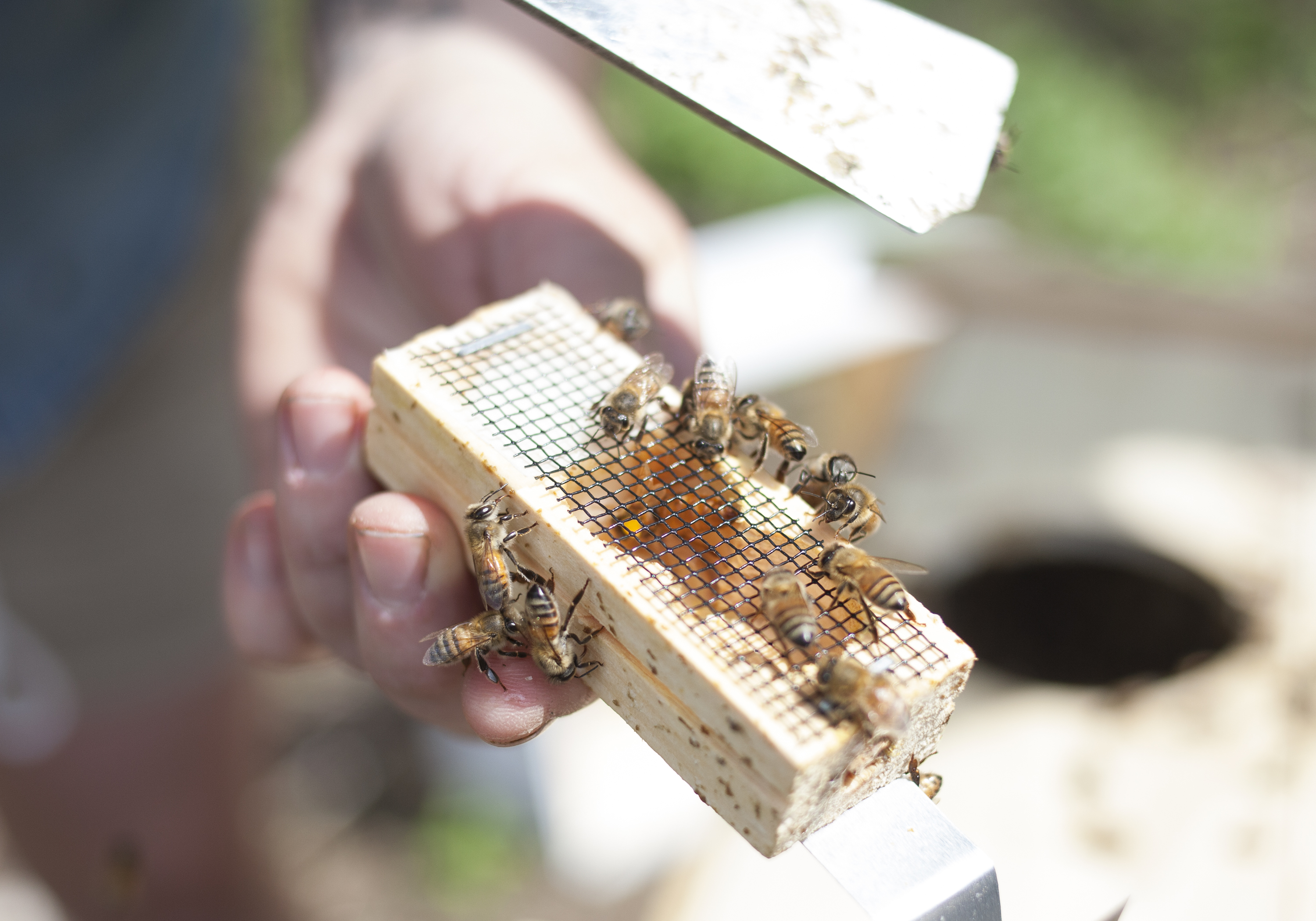
A beehive box
