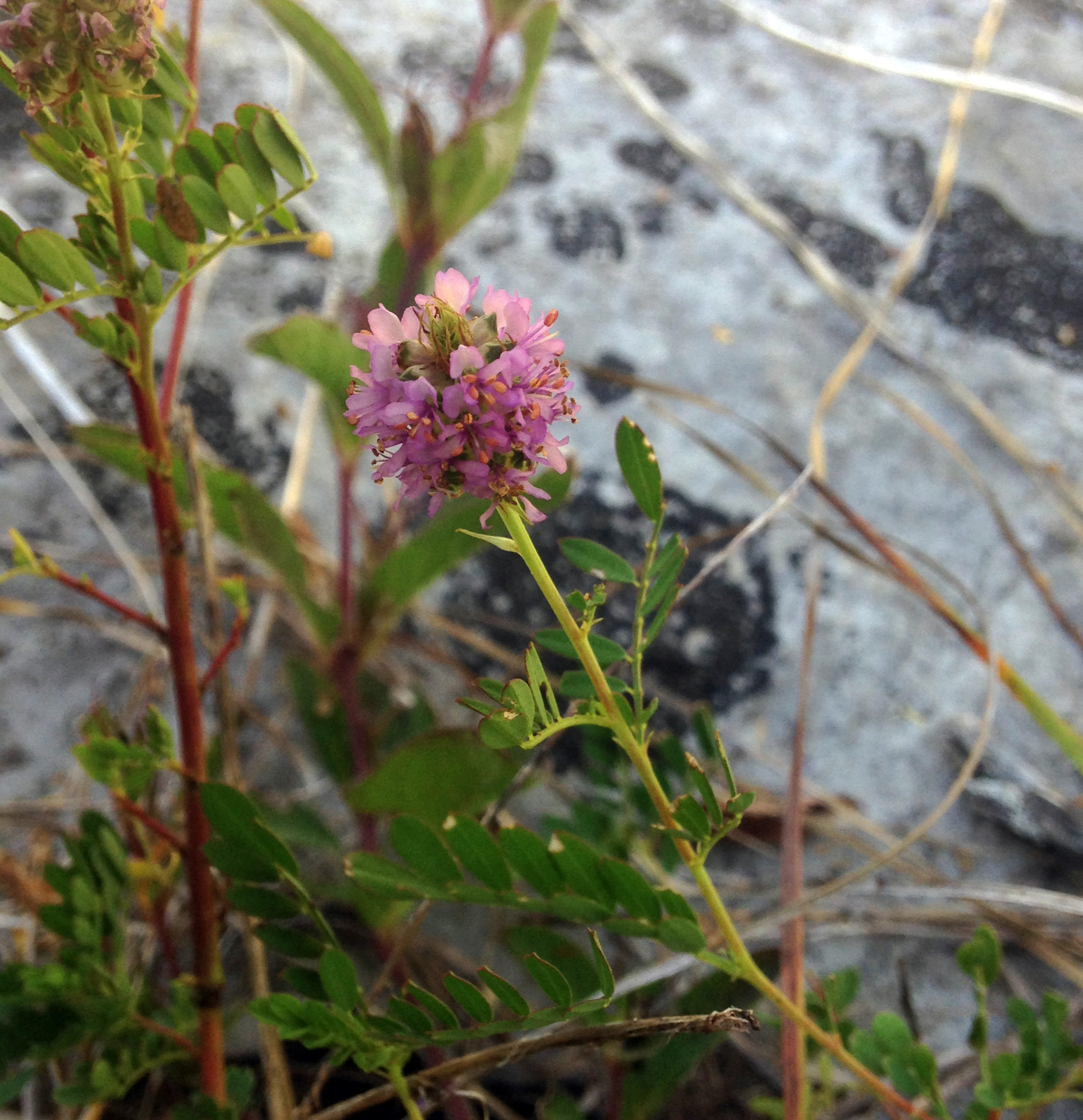

Conservation status
- Imperiled (NatureServe)

Scientific classification
- Kingdom: Plantae
- Clade: Tracheophytes
- Clade: Angiosperms
- Clade: Eudicots
- Clade: Rosids
- Order: Fabales
- Family: Fabaceae
- Subfamily: Faboideae
- Genus: Dalea
- Species: D. foliosa

Binomial name
- Dalea foliosa (A.Gray) Barneby

= Dalea foliosa =

Species of plant

Dalea foliosa, commonly called leafy prairie clover, is a species of flowering plant in the legume family (Fabaceae). It is an endangered species in the United States, where it occurs in three states: Illinois, Tennessee, and Alabama.

== Description ==
This is a perennial herb growing 20 to 80 centimeters tall, with a number of erect stems sprouting from a hard root crown. The leaves are each made up of hairless oval leaflets measuring up to 1.3 centimeters long. The inflorescence is a cone-shaped or cylindrical spike of many purple flowers with pointed green bracts between them. Blooming occurs in summer. The flowers are pollinated by bumblebees. The seeds can persist in a soil seed bank for 8 years.

== Habitat ==
The plant is native to glades and prairies with limestone substrates. The habitat may be moist or wet with seeps in the calcareous ground. It may grow alongside rose pink (Sabatia angularis) and brown-eyed susan (Rudbeckia triloba). In northern Illinois, where there are disjunct occurrences of the plant, it can be found in sunny, open dolomite prairies and river terraces that are periodically burned in the natural fire regime.

== Conservation ==
This plant was much more widespread in the past. As of 1997 there were 51 occurrences, mostly within the state of Tennessee. Most of these are in very poor condition and the species is in decline. The main cause of its decline is the destruction and degradation of its habitat. Much of its habitat has been consumed for development and is now in industrial and commercial use. Remaining habitat is overgrazed and invaded by introduced plant species such as Chinese privet (Ligustrum sinense) and Amur honeysuckle (Lonicera maackii). Plants have been destroyed during road maintenance and sewer installation. In most areas, the plant grows in a habitat that requires periodic wildfire for maintenance. Fire suppression efforts prevent this natural process and the habitat becomes overgrown with large and woody vegetation. The species is also fire-dependent because the seeds must be scarified if they are to germinate. Moisture is a limiting factor for the plants once they do germinate. The plant apparently has a low rate of reproductive success as few of the plants that germinate survive. Many of the seedlings are killed in dry summer conditions or frost heave and only 5% of the plants that become seedlings reach the age of five years. The plant does not reproduce until it is 2 or 3 years old. Genetic diversity is also low.

Some plants have been reintroduced to habitat where the species is hypothesized to have occurred in the prehistoric times, including part of Indiana.

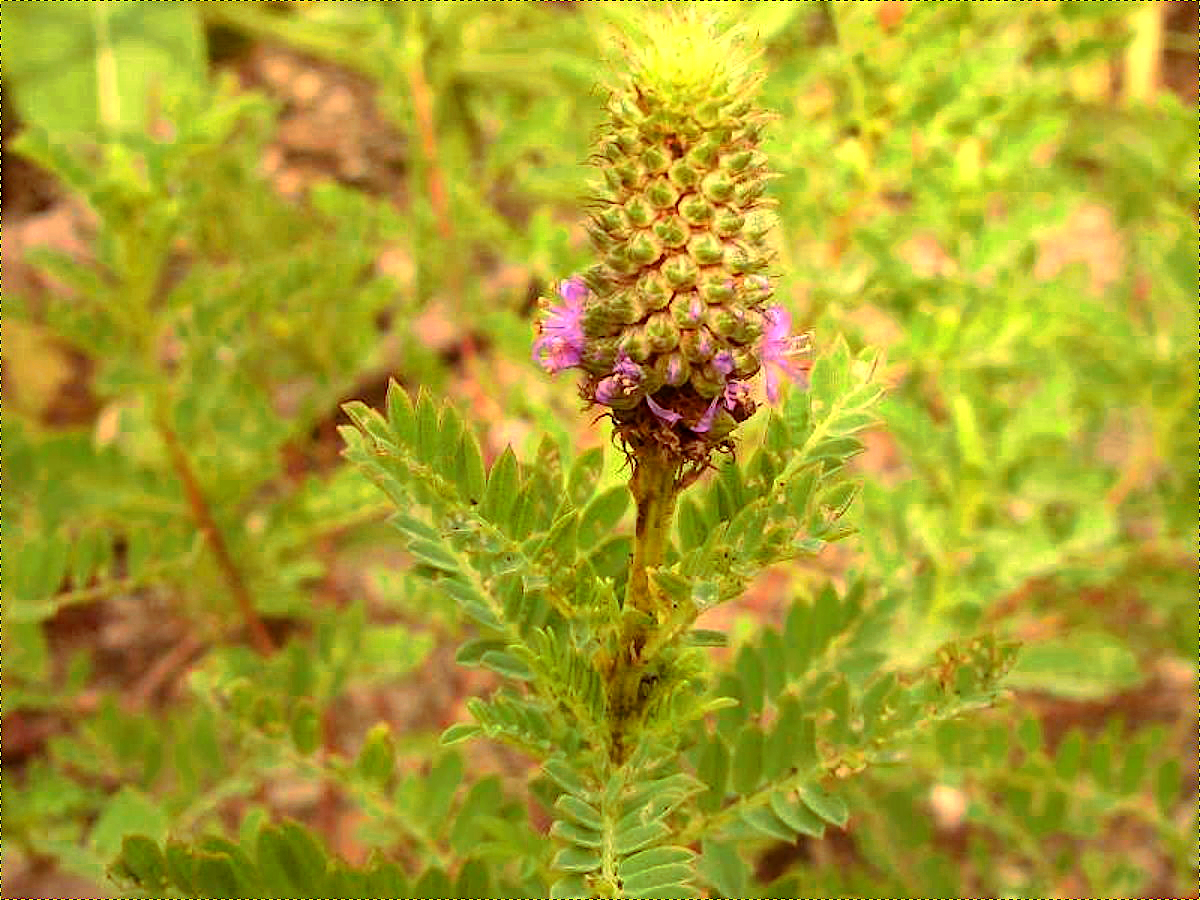
Dalea foliosa at Russell R. Kirt Prairie
