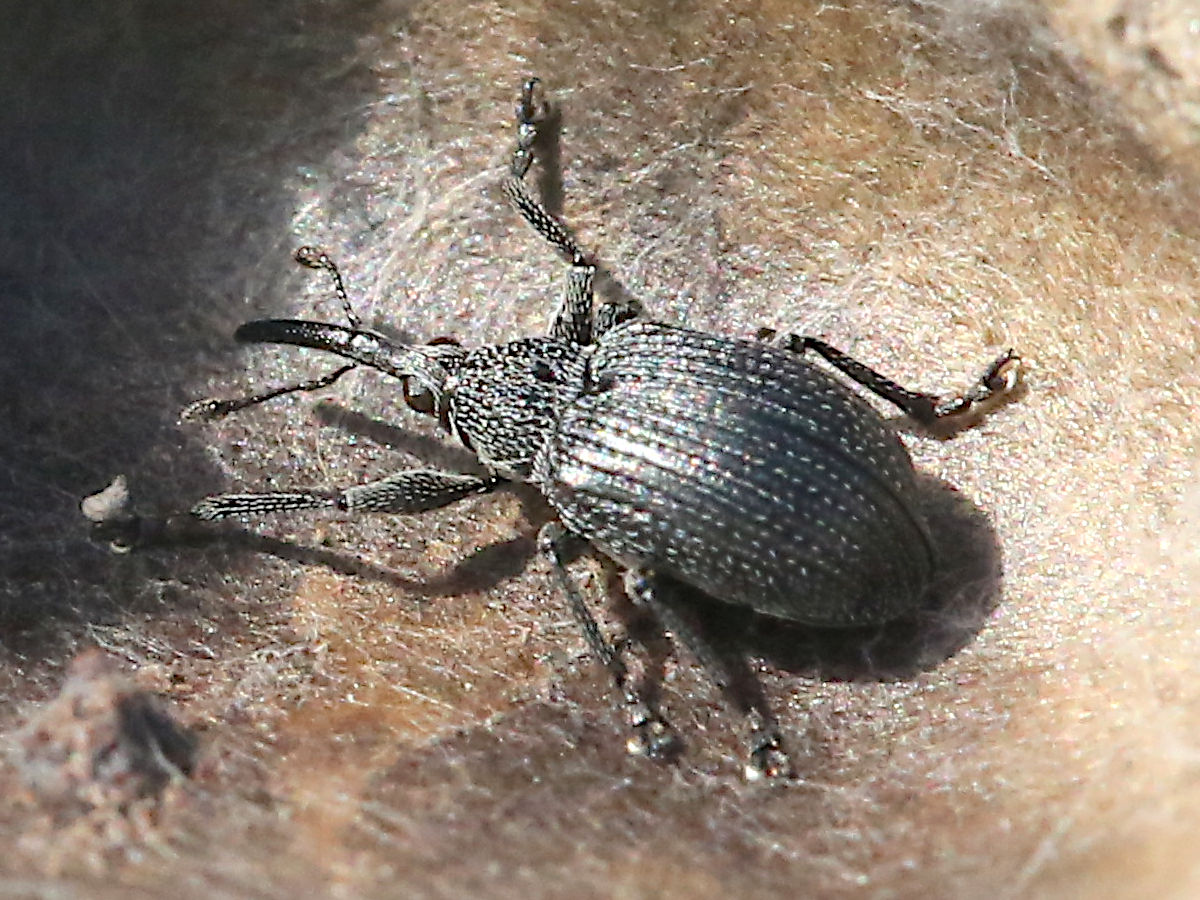
- T. rostrum

Scientific classification
- Kingdom: Animalia
- Phylum: Arthropoda
- Clade: Pancrustacea
- Class: Insecta
- Order: Coleoptera
- Suborder: Polyphaga
- Infraorder: Cucujiformia
- Family: Brentidae
- Subtribe: Trichapiina
- Genus: Trichapion; Wagner, 1912

= Trichapion =

Genus of weevil

Trichapion is a genus of weevil in the family Brentidae.

Species include:

- Trichapion aurichalceum (type species)
- Trichapion lativentre (Sesbania flower weevil)
- Trichapion nigrum
- Trichapion porcatum
- Trichapion rostrum (Baptisia seed pod weevil)

Several Trichapion species were formerly included in genus Apion.
