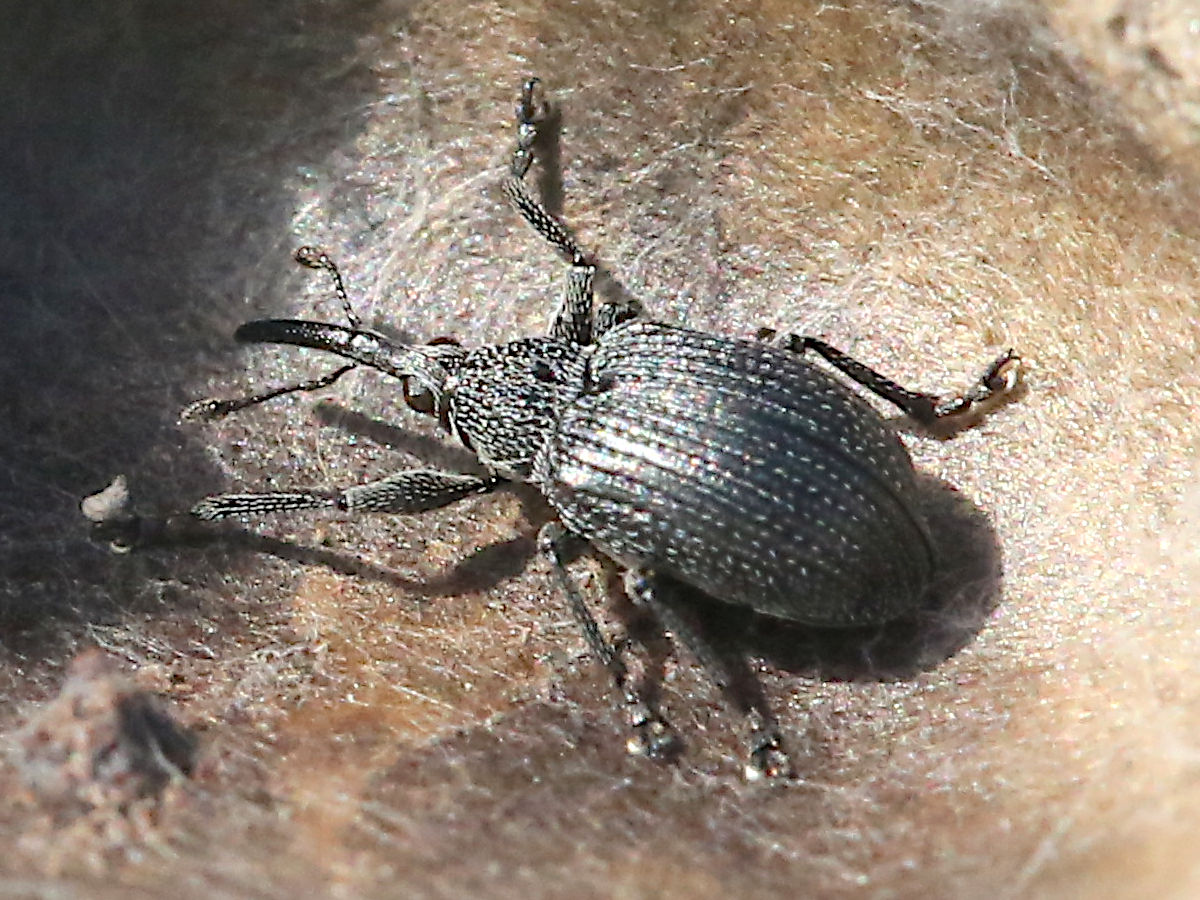
- Adult

Scientific classification
- Kingdom: Animalia
- Phylum: Arthropoda
- Clade: Pancrustacea
- Class: Insecta
- Order: Coleoptera
- Suborder: Polyphaga
- Infraorder: Cucujiformia
- Family: Brentidae
- Genus: Trichapion
- Species: T. rostrum

Binomial name
- Trichapion rostrum (Say, 1826)

= Trichapion rostrum =

Species of weevil in the family of Brentidae

Trichapion rostrum, the baptisia seed pod weevil or wild indigo weevil, is a species of weevil in the family Brentidae.

== Description ==
Adult is entirely black. Its namesake elongated snout is called a rostrum, and has antennae attached near its base.

== Ecology ==
Adult females deposit eggs in seedpods of wild indigo (genus Baptisia) plants; the larvae feed on seeds in the pods.

Seed predation by weevils can adversely affect reproduction of the Baptisia host.

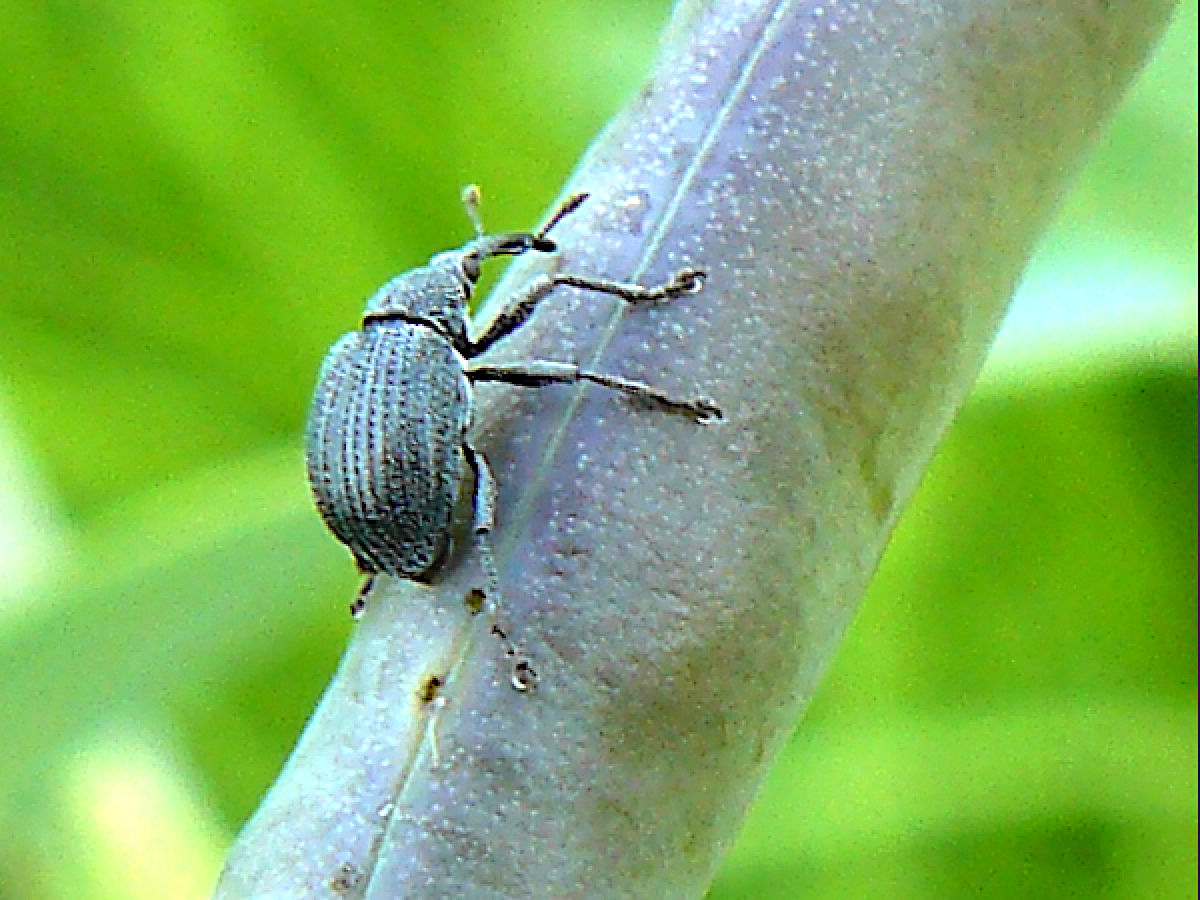
Female ovipositing

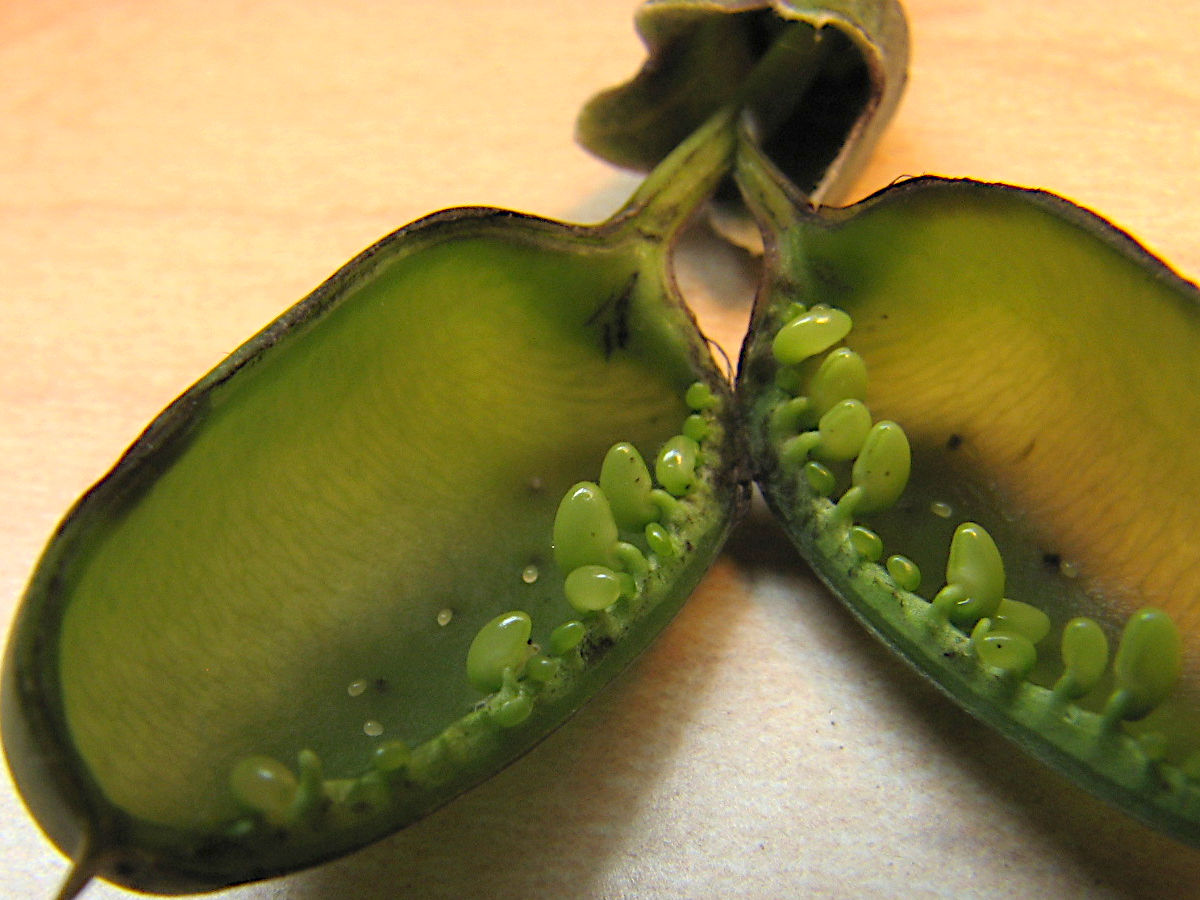
Eggs

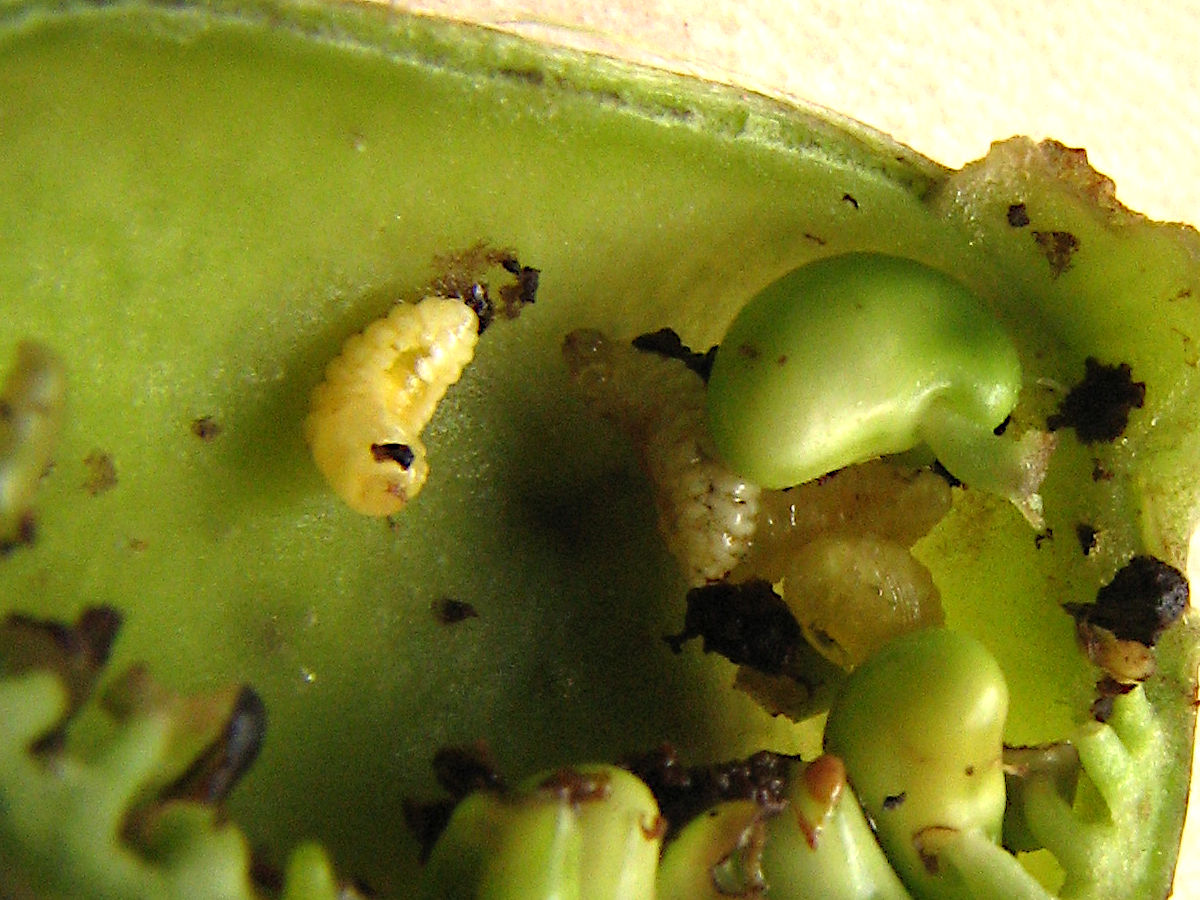
Larvae
