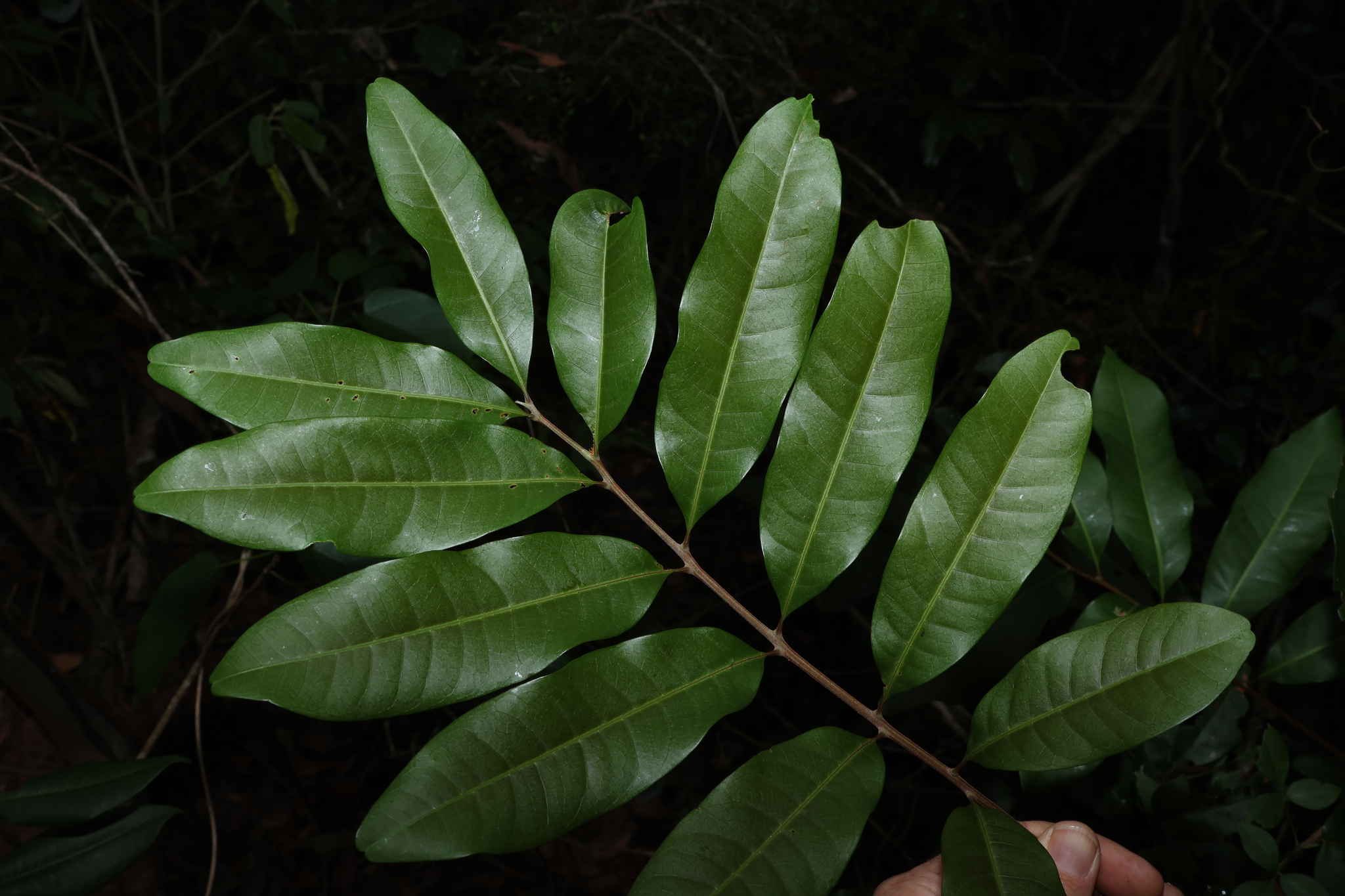
- Compound leaf near Marys Creek

Scientific classification
- Kingdom: Plantae
- Clade: Tracheophytes
- Clade: Angiosperms
- Clade: Eudicots
- Clade: Rosids
- Order: Sapindales
- Family: Sapindaceae
- Genus: Cupaniopsis
- Species: C. simulata

Binomial name
- Cupaniopsis simulata S.T.Reynolds

= Cupaniopsis simulata =

Species of tree

Cupaniopsis simulata, commonly known as northern tuckeroo, is a species of flowering plant in the soapberry family and is endemic to eastern Queensland. It is a rainforest tree with paripinnate leaves with 4 to 12 elliptic leaflets, and separate male and female flowers arranged in a thyrse, the fruit a brownish orange capsule.

== Description ==
Cupaniopsis simulata is a tall, straight tree that typically grows to a height of up to 25 m (82 ft). The bark is furrowed, greyish-brown with lighter blotches and its new growth is reddish, the stems hairy at first, later glabrous. The leaves are paripinnate with 4 to 12 elliptic leaflets 60–150 mm (2.4–5.9 in) long and 24–57 mm (0.94–2.24 in) wide on a petiole 37–82 mm (1.5–3.2 in) long, the leaf rhachis 50–175 mm (2.0–6.9 in) long. The leaflets are pale green, more or less shiny and glabrous. The flowers are arranged in thyrses or panicles 80–130 mm (3.1–5.1 in) long, the individual flowers white to yellow or green, up to 8 mm (0.31 in) in diameter on a pedicel 2.0–3.5 mm (0.079–0.138 in) long. The (usually) five sepals lobes are elliptic or more or less round, 2.5–4.0 mm (0.098–0.157 in) long and 2.0–2.5 mm (0.079–0.098 in) wide and the 5 petals are broadly egg-shaped, up to 2 mm (0.079 in) long and 1.5 mm (0.059 in) wide and hairy on the outside. The fruit is an oval, brownish orange capsule 17–28 mm (0.67–1.10 in) long and 14–27 mm (0.55–1.06 in) long with three lobes, each lobe with a black seed with an orange or red aril almost covering the seed.

== Taxonomy ==
Cupaniopsis simulata was first formally described in 1991 by Sally T. Reynolds in the journal Austrobaileya from specimens collected near Fairlies Knob in 1990. The specific epithet (simulata) means 'resembling' or 'imitating', referring to its similarity to C. anacardioides and C. dallachyi.

== Distribution and habitat ==
Northern tuckeroo grows in araucarian rainforest at altitudes from 120 to 540 m (390 to 1,770 ft) between central eastern and south-eastern Queensland.

== Conservation status ==
This species of Cupaniopsis is listed as of "least concern" under the Queensland Government Nature Conservation Act 1992.
