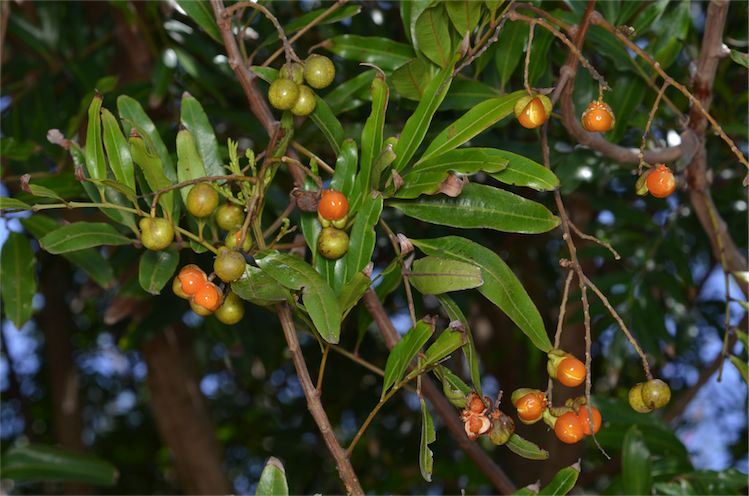

Scientific classification
- Kingdom: Plantae
- Clade: Tracheophytes
- Clade: Angiosperms
- Clade: Eudicots
- Clade: Rosids
- Order: Sapindales
- Family: Sapindaceae
- Genus: Cupaniopsis
- Species: C. baileyana

Binomial name
- Cupaniopsis baileyana Radlk.

Synonyms
- Ratonia foveolata (F.Muell.) Radlk.; Cupania foveolata F.Muell.; Cupaniopsis foveolata (F.Muell.) Radlk. sens. lat.

= Cupaniopsis baileyana =

Species of tree

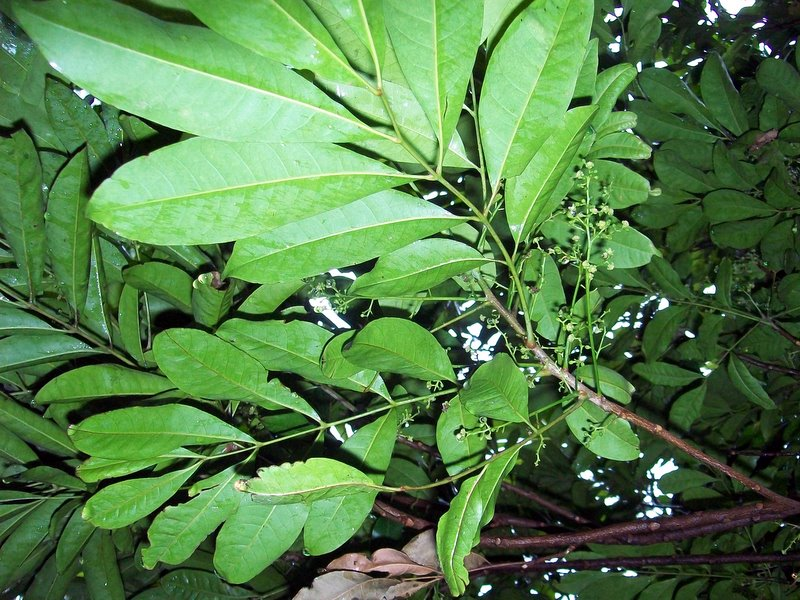
Leaves and flowers

Cupaniopsis baileyana, commonly known as narrow-leaved tuckeroo, toothed tuckeroo or white tamarind, is a species of flowering tree in the soapberry family and is endemic to eastern Australia. It is a tree with paripinnate leaves with 8 to 20 narrowly oblong to lance-shaped leaflets, and separate, male and female flowers arranged in panicles, the fruit a more or less spherical red to brown capsule.

== Description ==
Cupaniopsis baileyana is small tree that typically grows to a height of up to 13 m (43 ft) and has a dense crown. The trunk is mostly round, but with flanges on some specimens, and the bark is smooth, grey or brown. The leaves are paripinnate, 170–300 mm (6.7–11.8 in) long on a petiole 30–100 mm (1.2–3.9 in) long, with 8 to 20 narrowly oblong to lance-shaped leaflets, sometimes with the narrower end towards the base, 40–120 mm (1.6–4.7 in) long and 10–25 mm (0.39–0.98 in) wide on a petiolule 3–10 mm (0.12–0.39 in) long. The leaflets sometimes have toothed edges and the mid-vein and lateral veins are prominent on both surfaces. Separate male and female flowers are borne in panicles 60–100 mm (2.4–3.9 in) long, each flower on a pedicel 2–4 mm (0.079–0.157 in) long. The fruit is a spherical to oval, red to brown capsule, with an orange aril. The seeds are shiny blackish brown and almost covered by a yellow to orange-coloured aril. Domatia often occur where the main leaf vein meets the lateral veins. This feature distinguishes C. baileyana from C. serrata and C. flagelliformis.

== Taxonomy ==
Cupaniopsis baileyana was first formally described in 1924 by Ludwig Radlkofer in Repertorium Specierum Novarum Regni Vegetabilis. The specific epithet (baileyana) honours Frederick Manson Bailey.

== Distribution and habitat ==
Narrow-leaved tuckeroo grows mainly in, and on the edges of warmer rainforest from the south of Brisbane in Queensland to the Bulga-Comboyne area of New South Wales. It can be a pioneer species, growing in areas of forest disturbance.
