= Hibbertia mulligana =

Scientific classification
- Kingdom: Plantae
- Clade: Tracheophytes
- Clade: Angiosperms
- Clade: Eudicots
- Order: Dilleniales
- Family: Dilleniaceae
- Genus: Hibbertia
- Species: H. mulligana

Binomial name
- Hibbertia mulligana S.T.Reynolds

Species of plant

Hibbertia mulligana is a species of flowering plant in the family Dilleniaceae and is endemic to north-eastern Queensland. It is a sub-shrub with narrow elliptic leaves and yellow flowers with 70 to 74 stamens arranged around three densely hairy carpels.

== Description ==
Hibbertia mulligana is a sub-shrub that typically grows to a height of up to 1 m (3 ft 3 in) with branchlets that are densely hairy when young. The leaves are narrow elliptic, 32–45 mm (1.3–1.8 in) long and 2.5–5.5 mm (0.098–0.217 in) wide on a petiole 1.5–2.5 mm (0.059–0.098 in) long. Both sides of the leaves, but especially the lower surface, are covered with star-shaped hairs and the edges of the leaves curve downwards. The flowers are 12–15 mm (0.47–0.59 in) wide and arranged singly in leaf axils on a thin peduncle 12–30 mm (0.47–1.18 in) long. The five sepals are densely hairy on the outside, joined at the base with the outer sepal lobes mostly 9–11 mm (0.35–0.43 in) long and the inner ones 6–7 mm (0.24–0.28 in) long. The five petals are yellow, egg-shaped with the narrower end towards the base, 8–10 mm (0.31–0.39 in) long with 70 to 74 stamens arranged around three densely hairy carpels.

== Taxonomy ==
Hibbertia mulligana was first formally described in 1991 by Sally T. Reynolds in the journal Austrobaileya from specimens collected on Mount Mulligan in 1984. The specific epithet (mulligana) refers to the type location.

== Distribution and habitat ==
This hibbertia grows on scree slopes and cliffs around Laura and Mount Mulligan in north-eastern Queensland, at altitudes between 660 and 750 m (2,170 and 2,460 ft).

== Conservation status ==
This hibbertia is classified as of "least concern" under the Queensland Government Nature Conservation Act 1992.

== See also ==
- List of Hibbertia species
