= Cupaniopsis fleckeri =

Scientific classification
- Kingdom: Plantae
- Clade: Tracheophytes
- Clade: Angiosperms
- Clade: Eudicots
- Clade: Rosids
- Order: Sapindales
- Family: Sapindaceae
- Genus: Cupaniopsis
- Species: C. fleckeri

Binomial name
- Cupaniopsis fleckeri S.T.Reynolds

Species of tree

Cupaniopsis fleckeri is a species of flowering plant in the soapberry family and is endemic to northern Queensland. It is a small tree with paripinnate leaves with 8 to 10 elliptic to egg-shaped leaflets with the narrower end towards the base, and separate male and female flowers arranged in panicles.

== Description ==
Cupaniopsis fleckeri is small tree that typically grows to a height of up to 9 m (30 ft), its young branchlets covered with fine, soft hairs at first, later glabrous. The leaves are paripinnate with 4 or 5 elliptic to egg-shaped leaflets with the narrower end towards the base, on each side of the rhachis 20–60 mm (0.79–2.36 in) long. The leaflets are 20–60 mm (0.79–2.36 in) long, 15–30 mm (0.59–1.18 in) wide on a petiole 15–40 mm (0.59–1.57 in) long. There are usually up to 5 small domatia on each leaflet. Separate male and female flowers are borne in panicles 65–170 mm (2.6–6.7 in) long, each flower on a pedicel 3–6 mm (0.12–0.24 in) long. The sepals have more or less round lobes about 3.5–4.0 mm (0.14–0.16 in) long 2.5–4.5 mm (0.098–0.177 in) wide, and the petals are white, elliptic or broadly egg-shaped, about 3 mm (0.12 in) long and 2 mm (0.079 in) wide.

== Taxonomy ==
Cupaniopsis fleckeri was first formally described in 1984 by Sally T. Reynolds in the journal Austrobaileya from specimens collected in the Coen area by Hugo Flecker in 1949.

== Distribution and habitat ==
This species of Cupaniopsis grows in dry rainforest, usually on sandstone, at altitudes up to 400 m (1,300 ft), from the Torres Strait Islands to Cape Tribulation on Cape York Peninsula.

== Conservation status ==
Cupaniopsis fleckeri is list as of "least concern" under the Queensland Government Nature Conservation Act 1992.
