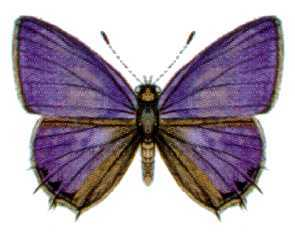
- A. s. affinis
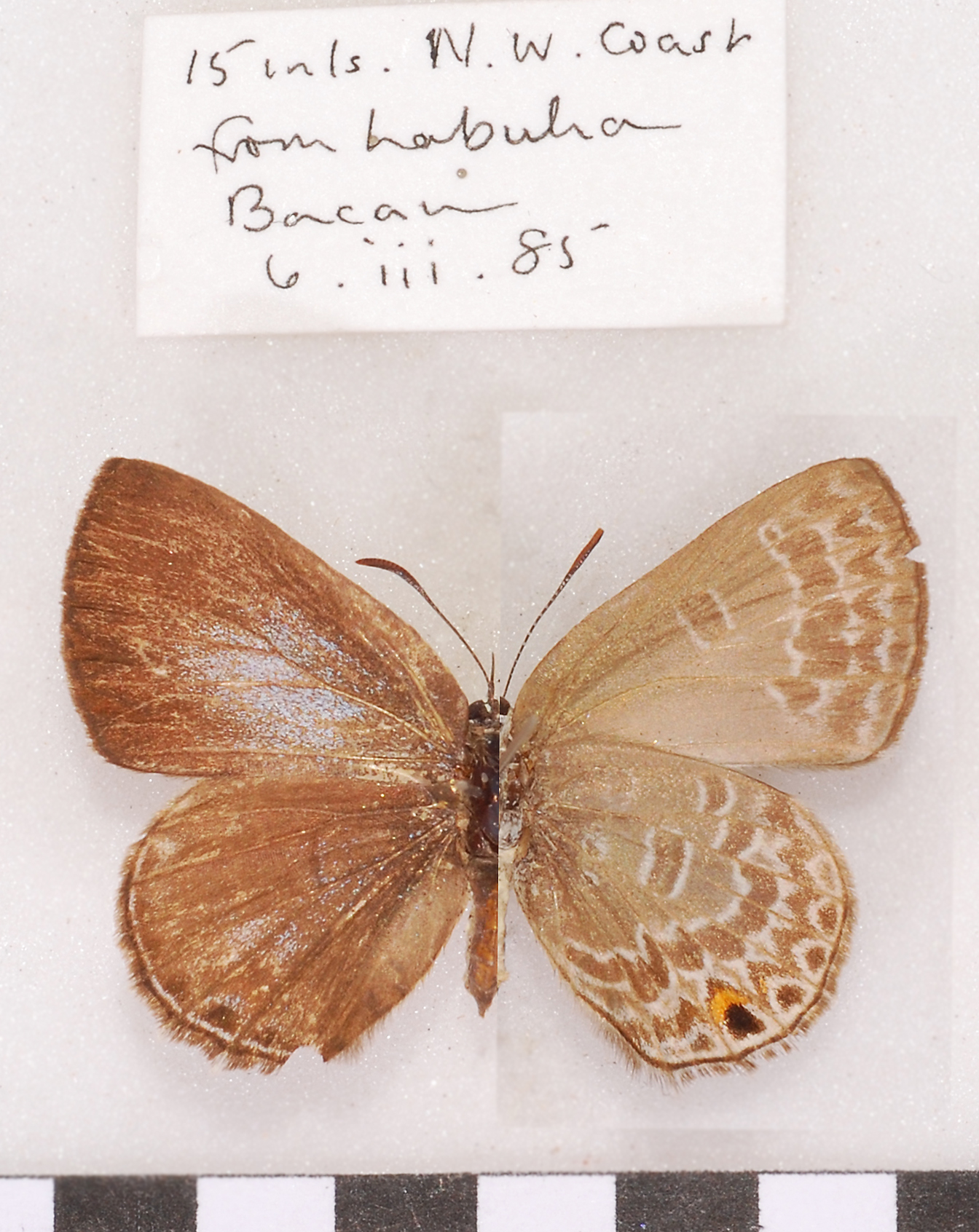
- A. s. amboinensis

Scientific classification
- Domain: Eukaryota
- Kingdom: Animalia
- Phylum: Arthropoda
- Class: Insecta
- Order: Lepidoptera
- Family: Lycaenidae
- Genus: Anthene
- Species: A. seltuttus

Binomial name
- Anthene seltuttus (Röber, 1886)

Synonyms
- Plebeius seltuttus Rober, 1886; Lycaenesthes aruana Butler, 1899; Lycaenesthes amboinensis Butler, 1899; Lycaenesthes violacea Butler, 1899; Lycaenesthes modestus Waterhouse, 1903; Lycaenesthes affinis Waterhouse & Turner, 1905

= Anthene seltuttus =

Species of butterfly

Anthene seltuttus, the dark ciliate blue, is a butterfly of the family Lycaenidae. It is found in Australia, New Guinea, Indonesia and a number of bordering Pacific islands.

The wingspan is about 25 mm.

The larvae feed on Cassia fistula, Pongamia pinnata, Cryptocarya hypospodia, Lagerstroemia speciosa, Syzygium wilsonii, Cupaniopsis anacardioides and Brachychiton acerifolium.

== Subspecies ==
- A. s. seltuttus (Aru, Waigeu, Salawati, Jobi, West Irian to New Guinea, Fergusson, Woodlark, Trobriand Island)
- A. s. affinis (Waterhouse & Turner, 1905) (Australia from Cape York to Yeppoon, Northern Territory)
- A. s. amboinensis (Butler, 1899) (Ambon, Obi, Bachan, Halmahera, Ternate)
- A. s. keyensis Tite, 1966 (Kai Island, Watubela Island)
- A. s. violacea (Butler, 1899) (Yela Island, Tagula, St. Aignan Island)
