= Hibbertia pholidota =

Scientific classification
- Kingdom: Plantae
- Clade: Tracheophytes
- Clade: Angiosperms
- Clade: Eudicots
- Order: Dilleniales
- Family: Dilleniaceae
- Genus: Hibbertia
- Species: H. pholidota

Binomial name
- Hibbertia pholidota S.T.Reynolds

Species of plant

Hibbertia pholidota is a species of flowering plant in the family Dilleniaceae and is endemic to a restricted area of Queensland. It is a spreading to scrambling shrub with scaly foliage, oblong leaves and yellow flowers with 30 to 36 stamens arranged around two densely scaly carpels.

== Description ==
Hibbertia pholidota is a spreading to scrambling shrub that typically grows to a height of up to 2 m (6 ft 7 in), and has scaly foliage. The leaves are oblong, mostly 15–30 mm (0.59–1.18 in) long, 6–10 mm (0.24–0.39 in) wide on a petiole 0.9–2.4 mm (0.035–0.094 in) long and densely scaly on the lower surface. The flowers are arranged singly on the ends of branches and short side shoots, with linear bracts 2.1–2.8 mm (0.083–0.110 in) long at the base. The five sepals are joined at the base, the outer sepal lobes 4.4–5.2 mm (0.17–0.20 in) long, 2.2–2.6 mm (0.087–0.102 in) wide and the inner sepal lobes longer and wider. The five petals are yellow, wedge-shaped to broadly egg-shaped with the narrower end towards the base, 5.3–7.6 mm (0.21–0.30 in) long and there are 30 to 36 stamens arranged in bundles around the two densely scaly carpels, each carpel with two ovules. Flowering has been observed in November and January.

== Taxonomy ==
Hibbertia pholidota was first formally described in 1991 by Sally T. Reynolds in the journal Austrobaileya from specimens collected on Hinchinbrook Island in 1977. The specific epithet (pholidota) means "scaly".

== Distribution and habitat ==
This hibbertia grows in sandy soil, often near rocks and usually along creeks on Hitchinbrook Island and along the nearby coast in northern Queensland.

== Conservation status ==
Hibbertia pholidota is classified as of "least concern" under the Queensland Government Nature Conservation Act 1992.

== See also ==
- List of Hibbertia species
