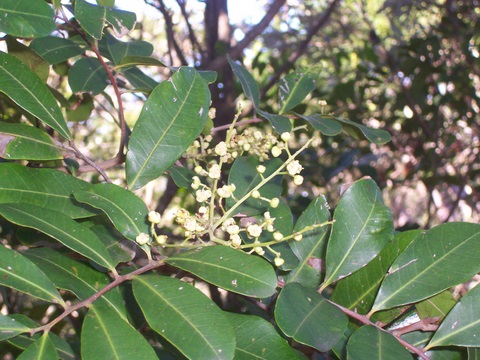
- Cupaniopsis anacardioides in Wyrrabalong National Park

Scientific classification
- Kingdom: Plantae
- Clade: Tracheophytes
- Clade: Angiosperms
- Clade: Eudicots
- Clade: Rosids
- Order: Sapindales
- Family: Sapindaceae
- Tribe: Cupanieae
- Genus: Cupaniopsis; Radlk.

Type species
- Cupaniopsis anacardioides (A.Rich.) Radlk.

Species
- See text

= Cupaniopsis =

Genus of flowering plants

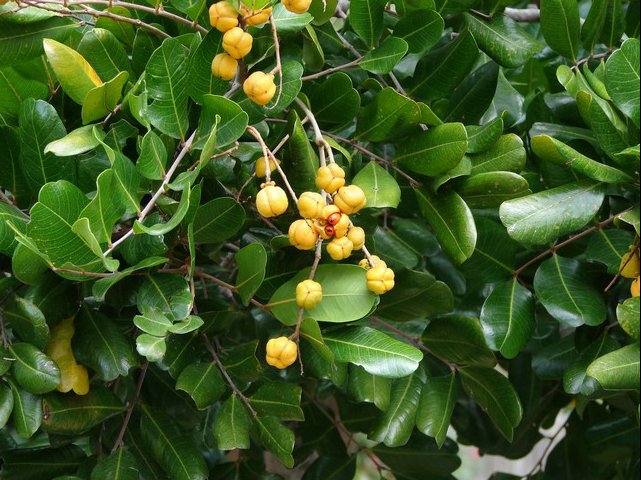
Cupaniopsis anacardioides Fruits and foliage

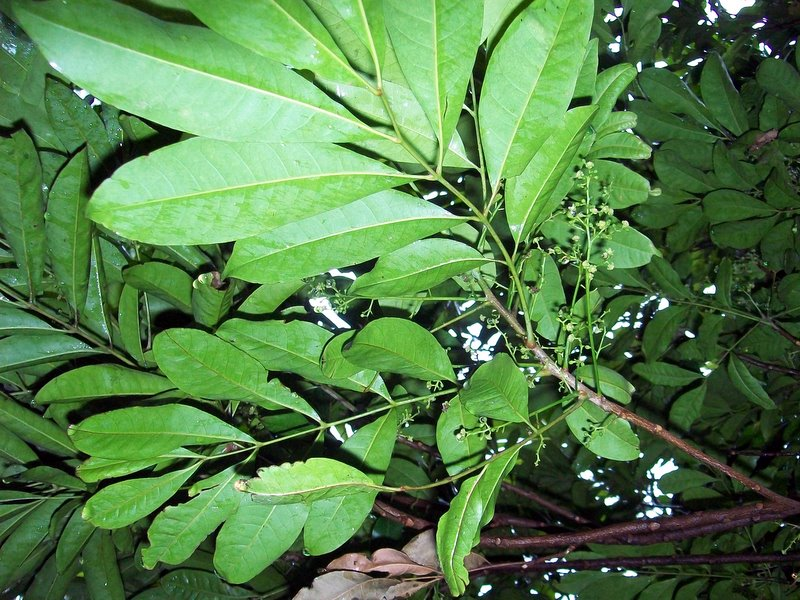
Cupaniopsis baileyana leaves and flowers

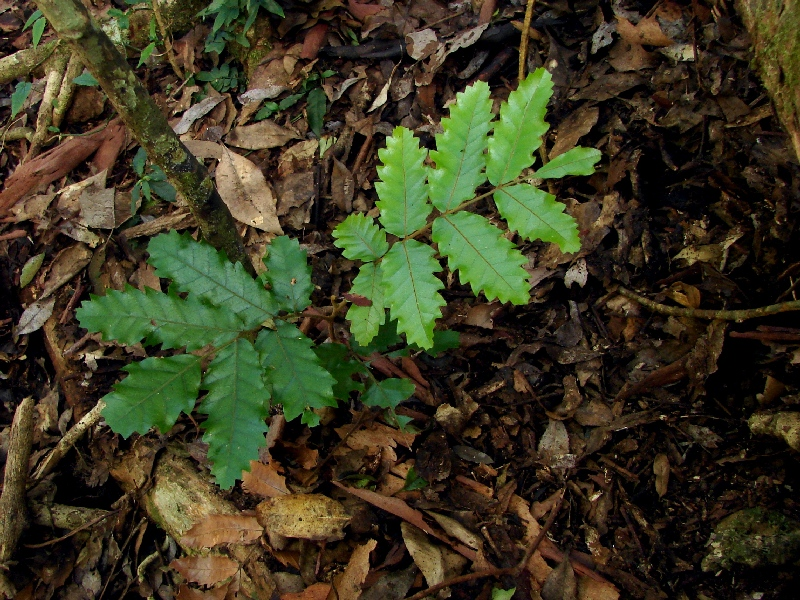
Cupaniopsis flagelliformis var. australis seedling

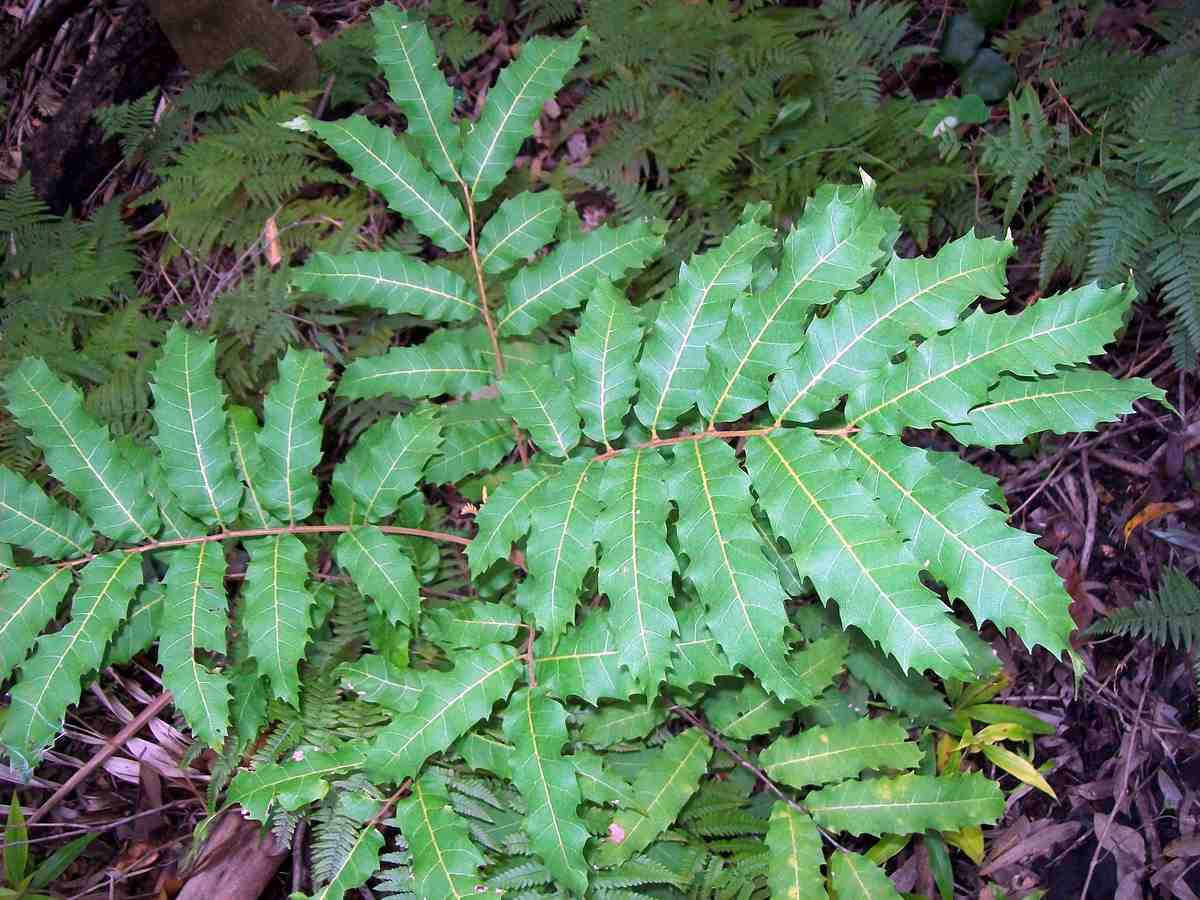
Cupaniopsis newmanii foliage of young specimen

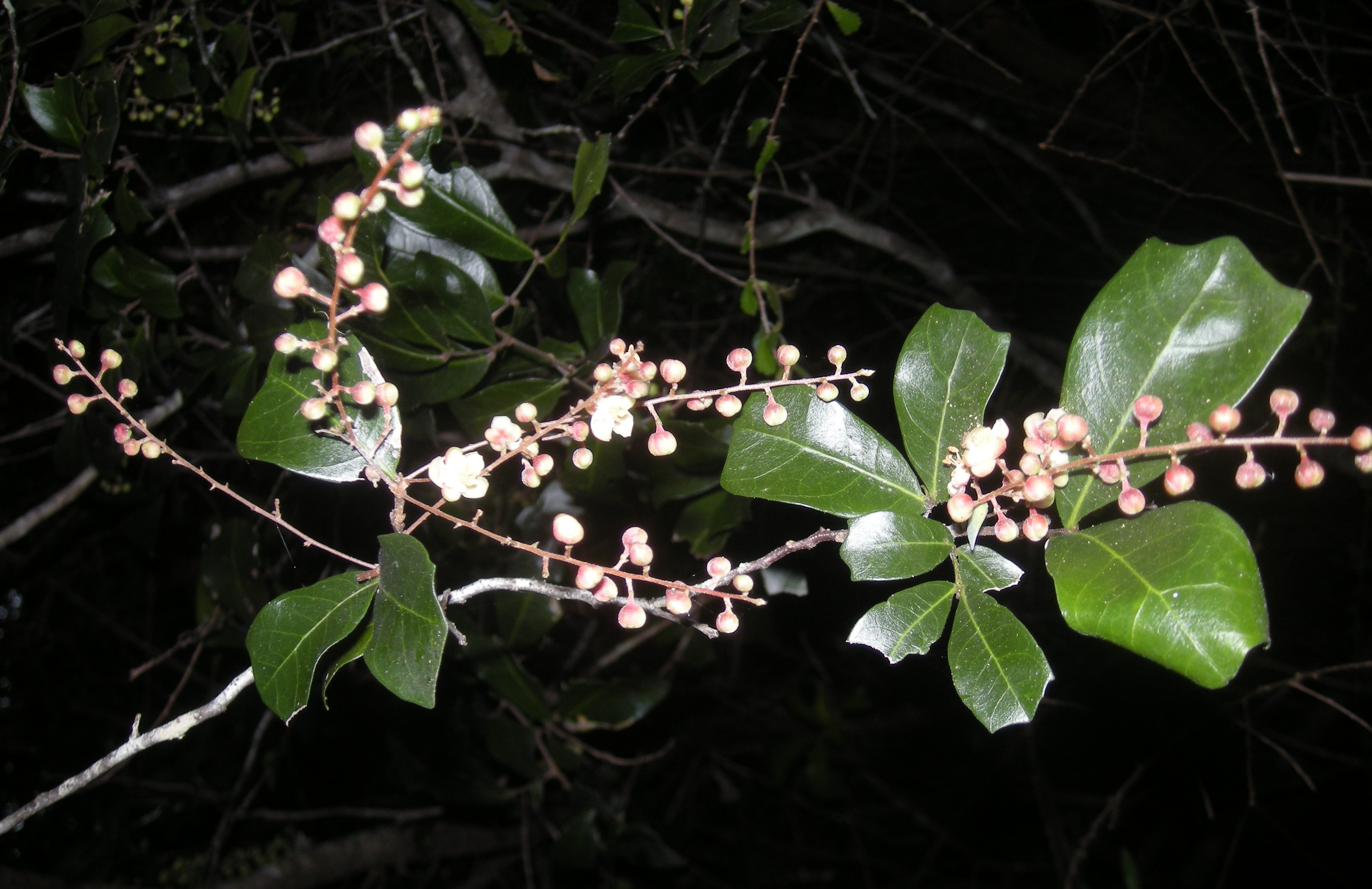
Cupaniopsis wadsworthii flowers

Cupaniopsis is a genus of about 45 species of flowering plants in the family, Sapindaceae and are native to Fiji, Indonesia, New Caledonia, New Guinea, the Solomon Islands Vanuatu, Samoa, Torres Strait Islands, Micronesia and Australia. Plants in the genus Cupaniopsis are trees with paripinnate with small, regular flowers with 5 sepals and petals with 6 to 10 stamens and the fruit a capsule.

== Description ==
Plants in the genus Cupaniopsis are trees, either monoecious or diecious with paripinnate leaves arranged in opposite pairs or alternately along the branches, the flowers arranged in leaf axils in raceme-like or panicle-like groups. The flowers are small, have 5 sepals and 5 petals with 6 to 10 stamens, the ovary usually with 3 locules. The fruit is an oval to more or less spherical, slightly fleshy capsule. The seed is elliptical with a thin, cup-shaped aril that usually nearly encloses the seed.

== Taxonomy ==
The genus Cupaniopsis was first formally described in 1879 by Ludwig Adolph Timotheus Radlkofer in the journal Sitzungsberichte der Mathematisch-Physikalischen Classe der Königlichen Bayerischen Akademie der Wissenschaften zu Munchen. The first species he named, the type species, was Cupaniopsis anacardioides. The genus name (Cupaniopsis) means a 'resemblance to the genus Cupania', in turn, named after the Italian monk, Francesco Cupani.

=== Species list ===
The following is a list of Cupaniopsis species accepted by Plants of the World Online as at August 2024:

- Cupaniopsis acuticarpa Adema (New Guinea)
- Cupaniopsis amoena A.C.Sm. (Fiji)
- Cupaniopsis anacardioides Radlk. – tuckeroo, cashew-leaf cupania, carrotwood, beach tamarind, green-leaved tamarind (New Guinea, N.S.W., N.T., Qld., W.A.)
- Cupaniopsis apiocarpa Radlk. (New Caledonia)
- Cupaniopsis azantha Radlk. (New Caledonia)
- Cupaniopsis baileyana Radlk. – narrow-leaved tuckeroo, toothed tuckeroo, white tamarind (N.S.W., Qld.)
- Cupaniopsis bilocularis Adema (New Guinea)
- Cupaniopsis bullata Adema (New Guinea)
- Cupaniopsis celebica Adema Sulawesi
- Cupaniopsis chytradenia Radlk. (New Caledonia)
- Cupaniopsis cooperorum P.I.Forst. – Cooper's puzzle (Qld.)
- Cupaniopsis crassivalvis Radlk. (New Caledonia)
- Cupaniopsis curvidens Radlk. (New Guinea)
- Cupaniopsis dallachyi S.T.Reynolds (Qld.)
- Cupaniopsis diploglottoides Adema – velvet tamarind (Qld.)
- Cupaniopsis euneura Adema (New Guinea)
- Cupaniopsis flagelliformis (F.M.Bailey) Radlk. – brown tuckeroo, weeping flower tamarind (Qld., N.S.W.),
- Cupaniopsis fleckeri S.T.Reynolds (Qld.)
- Cupaniopsis foveolata (F.Muell.) Radlk. (Qld.)
- Cupaniopsis grisea Adema (New Caledonia)
- Cupaniopsis hypodermatica Radlk. (New Caledonia)
- Cupaniopsis kajewskii Merr. & L.M.Perry (Solomon Islands)
- Cupaniopsis leptobotrys (A.Gray) Radlk. (Fiji, Vanuatu)
- Cupaniopsis mackeeana Adema (New Caledonia)
- Cupaniopsis macrocarpa Radlk. (New Caledonia)
- Cupaniopsis macropetala Radlk. (New Guinea)
- Cupaniopsis megalocarpa Adema (New Caledonia)
- Cupaniopsis napaensis Adema (New Guinea)
- Cupaniopsis newmanii S.T.Reynolds – long-leaved tuckeroo(Qld., N.S.W.)
- Cupaniopsis papillosa P.I.Forst. – Tully Falls tamarind (Qld.)
- Cupaniopsis petiolulata Radlk. (New Caledonia)
- Cupaniopsis phalacrocarpa Adema (New Caledonia)
- Cupaniopsis phanerophlebia Merr. & L.M.Perry (New Guinea)
- Cupaniopsis platycarpa Radlk. (New Guinea)
- Cupaniopsis rhytidocarpa Adema (New Guinea)
- Cupaniopsis serrata (F.Muell.) Radlk. (Qld., N.S.W.) – smooth tuckeroo (N.S.W., Qld.)
- Cupaniopsis shirleyana (F.M.Bailey) Radlk. – wedge-leaved tuckeroo (Qld.)
- Cupaniopsis simulata S.T.Reynolds – northern tuckeroo (Qld.)
- Cupaniopsis stenopetala Radlk. (New Guinea, Maluku Islands)
- Cupaniopsis strigosa Adema (Sulawesi)
- Cupaniopsis sylvatica Guillaumin (New Caledonia)
- Cupaniopsis tomentella (F.Muell. ex Benth.) S.T.Reynolds (Qld.)
- Cupaniopsis trigonocarpa Radlk. (New Caledonia)
- Cupaniopsis vitiensis Radlk. (Fiji)
- Cupaniopsis wadsworthii (F.Muell.) Radlk. (Qld.)

In 1991 a 190-page monograph of the genus was published by Dutch botanist Frits Adema.

Australian botanist Sally T. Reynolds, from 1984 to 1991 published new formal scientific names, descriptions, updates and species clarifications, in her scientific journal articles and the Flora of Australia treatment.

== Conservation status ==
Globally, the New Caledonian endemic species C. crassivalvis has become extinct according to the IUCN's 1998 assessment.

In Australia, C. shirleyana and C. tomentella are listed as "vulnerable" under the Australian Government Environment Protection and Biodiversity Conservation Act 1999 and C. cooperorum is listed as "vulnerable" under the Queensland Government Nature Conservation Act. C. newmannii is listed as "near threatened" under the same Act. C. serrata is listed as "endangered" in New South Wales under the Biodiversity Conservation Act.

== Invasive species ==
C. anacardioides has been introduced into the United States, where in some parts they are invasive plants, primarily in Florida and Hawaii, where the common name carrotwood applies.
