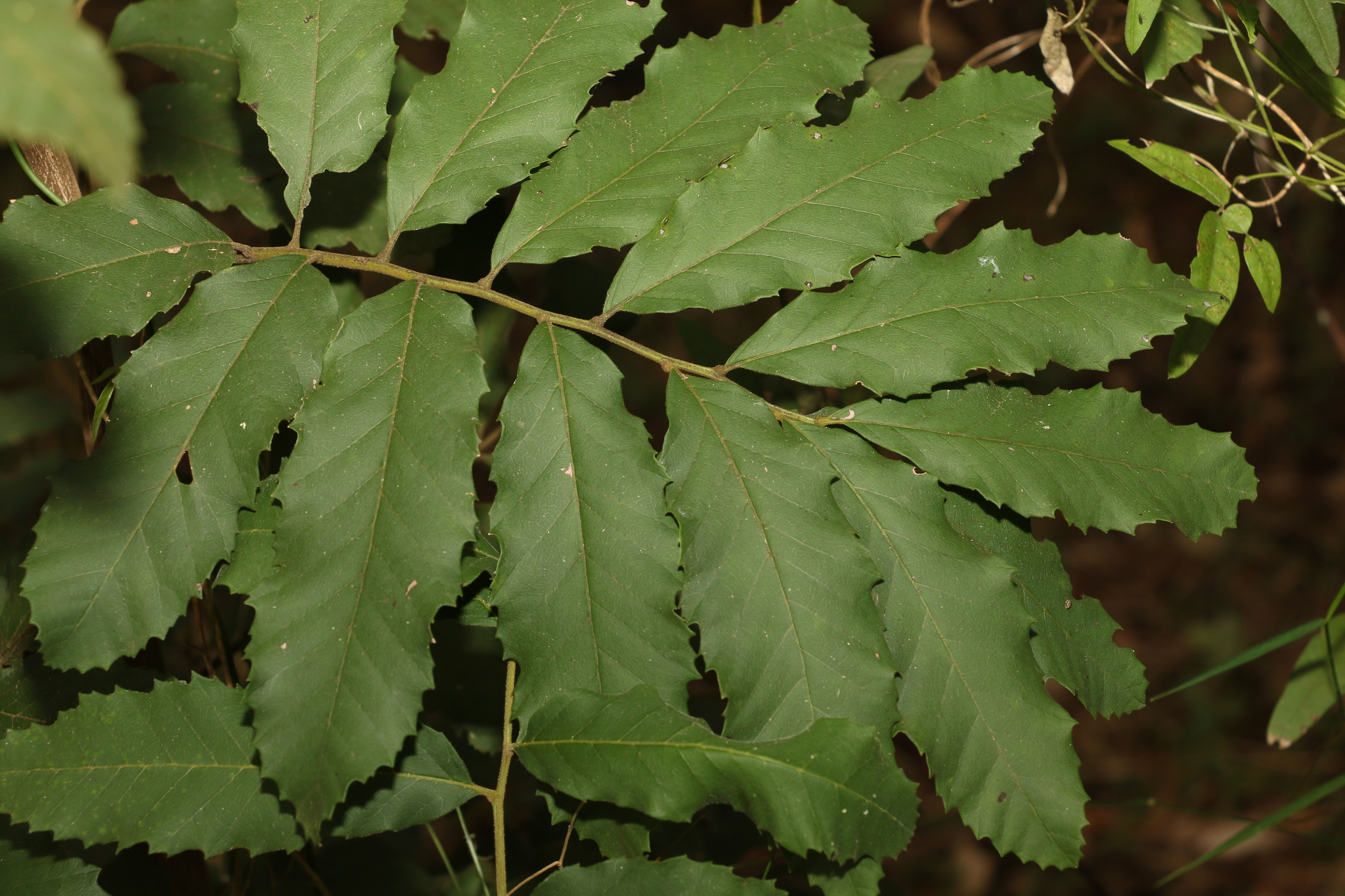
- Compound leaf near Flinders Peak

Conservation status
- Vulnerable (EPBC Act)

Scientific classification
- Kingdom: Plantae
- Clade: Tracheophytes
- Clade: Angiosperms
- Clade: Eudicots
- Clade: Rosids
- Order: Sapindales
- Family: Sapindaceae
- Genus: Cupaniopsis
- Species: C. tomentella

Binomial name
- Cupaniopsis tomentella (F.Muell. ex Benth.) S.T.Reynolds

= Cupaniopsis tomentella =

Species of tree

Cupaniopsis tomentella, commonly known as Boonah tuckeroo, is a species of flowering plant in the soapberry family and is endemic to south-eastern Queensland. It is a tree with paripinnate leaves with usually 6 to 8 elliptic or oblong leaflets, and separate male and female flowers arranged in a panicle, the fruit an orange-yellow capsule with a red flush.

== Description ==
Cupaniopsis tomentella is a tree that typically grows to a height of up to 10 m (33 ft), its young branchlets with woolly hairs, the branchlets with lenticels. The leaves are paripinnate with usually six to eight elliptic or oblong leaflets 40–90 mm (1.6–3.5 in) long and 20–40 mm (0.79–1.57 in) wide on a petiole 35–70 mm (1.4–2.8 in) long, the leaf rhachis 60–130 mm (2.4–5.1 in) long. The flowers are arranged in panicles 20–90 mm (0.79–3.54 in) long, each flower on a pedicel 1 mm (0.039 in) long. The sepals lobes are hairy, 5–6 mm (0.20–0.24 in) long and the petals are white, about 2.5 mm (0.098 in) long. The fruit is a hairy, elliptic, orange-yellow sessile capsule, flushed with red, 20–25 mm (0.79–0.98 in) long 30–40 mm (1.2–1.6 in) wide, the seed with a yellow aril.

== Taxonomy ==
This species was first formally described in 1863 by George Bentham from an unpublished description by Ferdinand von Mueller. Bentham gave it the name Cupania tomentella from specimens collected by Walter Hill near Moreton Bay. In 1984, Sally T. Reynolds transferred the species to Cupaniopsis as C. tomentella in the journal Austrobaileya. The specific epithet (tomentella) means 'minutely tomentose'.

== Distribution and habitat ==
Boonah tuckeroo occurs between Boonah and Ipswich in south-east Queensland, usually in dry scrubs.

== Conservation status ==
This species of Cupaniopsis is listed as "vulnerable" under the Australian Government Environment Protection and Biodiversity Conservation Act 1999 and the Queensland Government Nature Conservation Act 1992. The main threats to the species are its fragmented distribution and smothering exotic vines.
