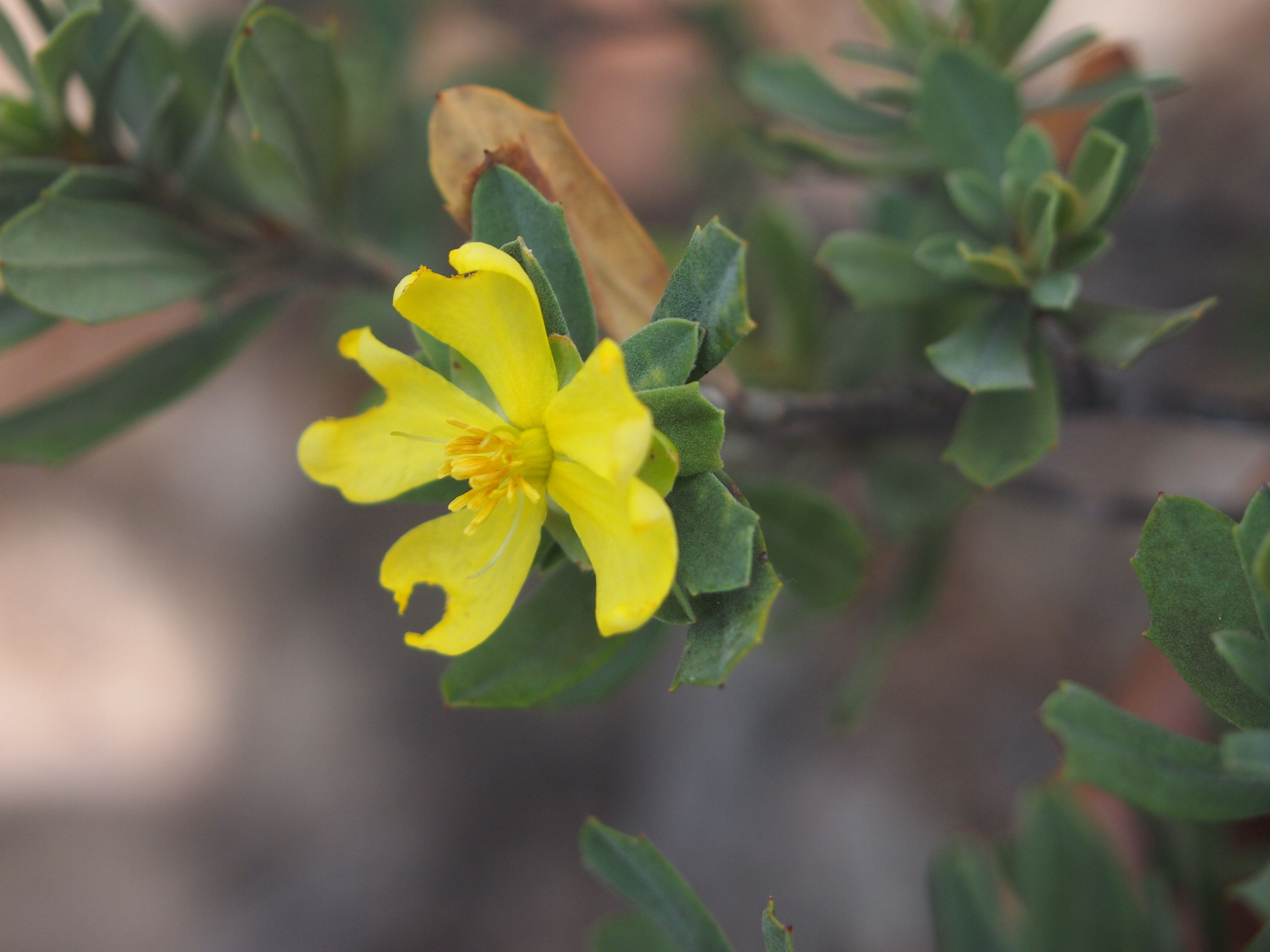
- In the Blackdown Tableland National Park

Scientific classification
- Kingdom: Plantae
- Clade: Tracheophytes
- Clade: Angiosperms
- Clade: Eudicots
- Order: Dilleniales
- Family: Dilleniaceae
- Genus: Hibbertia
- Species: H. oligodonta

Binomial name
- Hibbertia oligodonta S.T.Reynolds

= Hibbertia oligodonta =

Species of plant

Hibbertia oligodonta is a species of flowering plant in the family Dilleniaceae, and is endemic to central Queensland. It is a low, compact shrub with many stems and egg-shaped or wedge-shaped leaves with the narrower end towards the base, and yellow flowers with 22 to 38 stamens arranged around three glabrous carpels.

== Description ==
Hibbertia oligodonta is compact, erect shrub that typically grows to a height of up to 1 m (3 ft 3 in) with straggly branches and branchlets that are densely hairy when young. The leaves are egg-shaped or wedge-shaped with the narrower end towards the base, 14–28 mm (0.55–1.10 in) long and 6–14 mm (0.24–0.55 in) wide on a petiole 1.5–3 mm (0.059–0.118 in) long. There are usually up to four teeth on each side of the leaves and both surfaces are densely hairy. The flowers are arranged singly in leaf axils on the ends of short side branches and are sessile, the five sepals broadly elliptic and 7–10 mm (0.28–0.39 in) long, the inner sepals larger than the outer ones. The five petals are yellow, egg-shaped to wedge-shaped with the narrower end towards the base, 9–15 mm (0.35–0.59 in) long with 22 to 38 stamens arranged around three glabrous carpels.

== Taxonomy ==
Hibbertia oligodonta was first formally described in 1991 by Sally T. Reynolds in the journal Austrobaileya from specimens collected near Bauhinia, Queensland in 1964. The specific epithet (oligodonta) means "few-toothed", referring to the edges of the leaves.

== Distribution and habitat ==
This hibbertia usually grows in open forest on rocky outcrops and sandstone ridges, in and around the Blackdown Tableland at altitudes between 600 and 700 m (2,000 and 2,300 ft).

== Conservation status ==
This hibbertia is classified as of "least concern" under the Queensland Government Nature Conservation Act 1992.

== See also ==
- List of Hibbertia species
