= Cupaniopsis diploglottoides =

Scientific classification
- Kingdom: Plantae
- Clade: Tracheophytes
- Clade: Angiosperms
- Clade: Eudicots
- Clade: Rosids
- Order: Sapindales
- Family: Sapindaceae
- Genus: Cupaniopsis
- Species: C. diploglottoides

Binomial name
- Cupaniopsis diploglottoides Adema

Species of tree

Cupaniopsis diploglottoides, commonly known as velvet tamarind, is a species of flowering plant in the soapberry family and is endemic to north-east Queensland. It is a shrub or tree with paripinnate leaves with sessile leaflets and separate male and female flowers.

== Description ==
Cupaniopsis diploglottoides is tree that sometimes grows to the height of a small tree, but forms flowers and fruit as a single stemmed shrub 2–3 m (6 ft 7 in – 9 ft 10 in) tall. Its leaves are paripinnate with leaflets 145–180 mm (5.7–7.1 in) long, 65–70 mm (2.6–2.8 in) wide. The lower surface of the leaves and the midvein on the upper surface are hairy. Separate male and female flowers are borne in panicles, the flowers about 8–10 mm (0.31–0.39 in) wide and hairy. The sepal lobes are hairy on the outside, 5–6 mm (0.20–0.24 in) long, the petals are about 1 mm (0.039 in) long and there are 8 stamens with filaments about 3 mm (0.12 in) long.

== Taxonomy ==
Cupaniopsis diploglottoides was first formally described in 1991 by Frits Adema in the Leiden Botanical Series from specimens collected by Lindsay Stuart Smith, south-east of Cooktown in 1960.

== Distribution and habitat ==
This species of Cupaniopsis grows in rainforest at altitudes between 150–750 m (490–2,460 ft) in the Rossville area of north-eastern Queensland.
