= Cupaniopsis papillosa =

Scientific classification
- Kingdom: Plantae
- Clade: Tracheophytes
- Clade: Angiosperms
- Clade: Eudicots
- Clade: Rosids
- Order: Sapindales
- Family: Sapindaceae
- Genus: Cupaniopsis
- Species: C. papillosa

Binomial name
- Cupaniopsis papillosa P.I.Forst.

Species of tree

Cupaniopsis papillosa, commonly known as Tully Falls tamarind, is a species of flowering plant in the soapberry family and is endemic to a restricted area near Ravenshoe. It is a shrub or small tree with paripinnate leaves with 5 to 7 elliptic, egg-shaped or lance-shaped leaves with the narrower end towards the base, separate male and female, white flowers arranged in panicles, the fruit a fawn-yellow capsule.

== Description ==
Cupaniopsis papillosa is a shrub or small tree that typically grows to a height of up to 12 m (39 ft) and often has many stems. Its leaves are paripinnate with 5 to 6 leaflets on a petiole 50–75 mm (2.0–3.0 in) long, the leaflets elliptic, egg-shaped or lance-shaped, 42–185 mm (1.7–7.3 in) long 15–56 mm (0.59–2.20 in) wide on a rhachis 40–275 mm (1.6–10.8 in) long and slightly flattened or winged. Separate male and female flowers are borne in pendulous panicles 70–300 mm (2.8–11.8 in) long, male flowers on a pedicel 3–4 mm (0.12–0.16 in) long. The 5 sepals are arranged in two rows, the outer ones 3–4.5 mm (0.12–0.18 in) long and the inner ones 2.8–4 mm (0.11–0.16 in) long. The 5 petals are white, fan-shaped, 1.8–3 mm (0.071–0.118 in) long and hairy and the male flowers have 8 stamens. The fruit is fawn-yellow and slightly rough, 20–35 mm (0.79–1.38 in) long and 15–30 mm (0.59–1.18 in) wide. The seeds are glossy tan-brown with a red aril.

== Taxonomy ==
Cupaniopsis papillosa was first formally described in 2006 by Paul Irwin Forster in the journal Austrobaileya from specimens collected near Ravenshoe in 2004. The specific epithet (papillosa) means 'pipillose'.

== Distribution and habitat ==
Tully Falls tamarind grows as an understorey shrub at altitudes between 900–1,000 m (3,000–3,300 ft) in the Ravenshoe - Tully Falls area in north Queensland.
