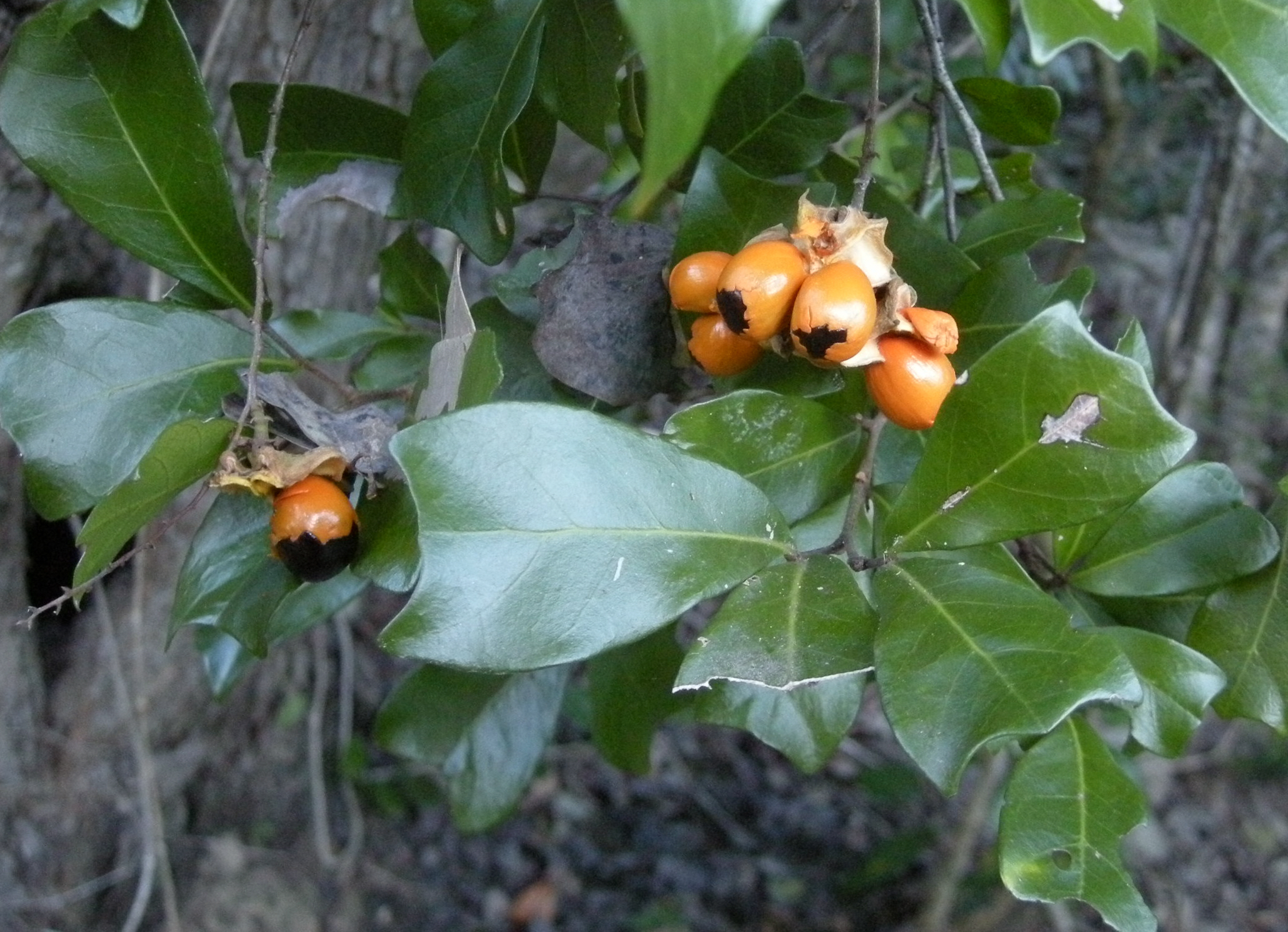
- Leaves and fruit at Mount Archer National Park

Scientific classification
- Kingdom: Plantae
- Clade: Tracheophytes
- Clade: Angiosperms
- Clade: Eudicots
- Clade: Rosids
- Order: Sapindales
- Family: Sapindaceae
- Genus: Cupaniopsis
- Species: C. wadsworthii

Binomial name
- Cupaniopsis wadsworthii (F.Muell.) Radlk.

Synonyms
- Cupania wadsworthii (F.Muell.) F.Muell.; Harpullia wadsworthii F.Muell.; Harpullia wodsworthii Walp. orth. var.

= Cupaniopsis wadsworthii =

Species of tree

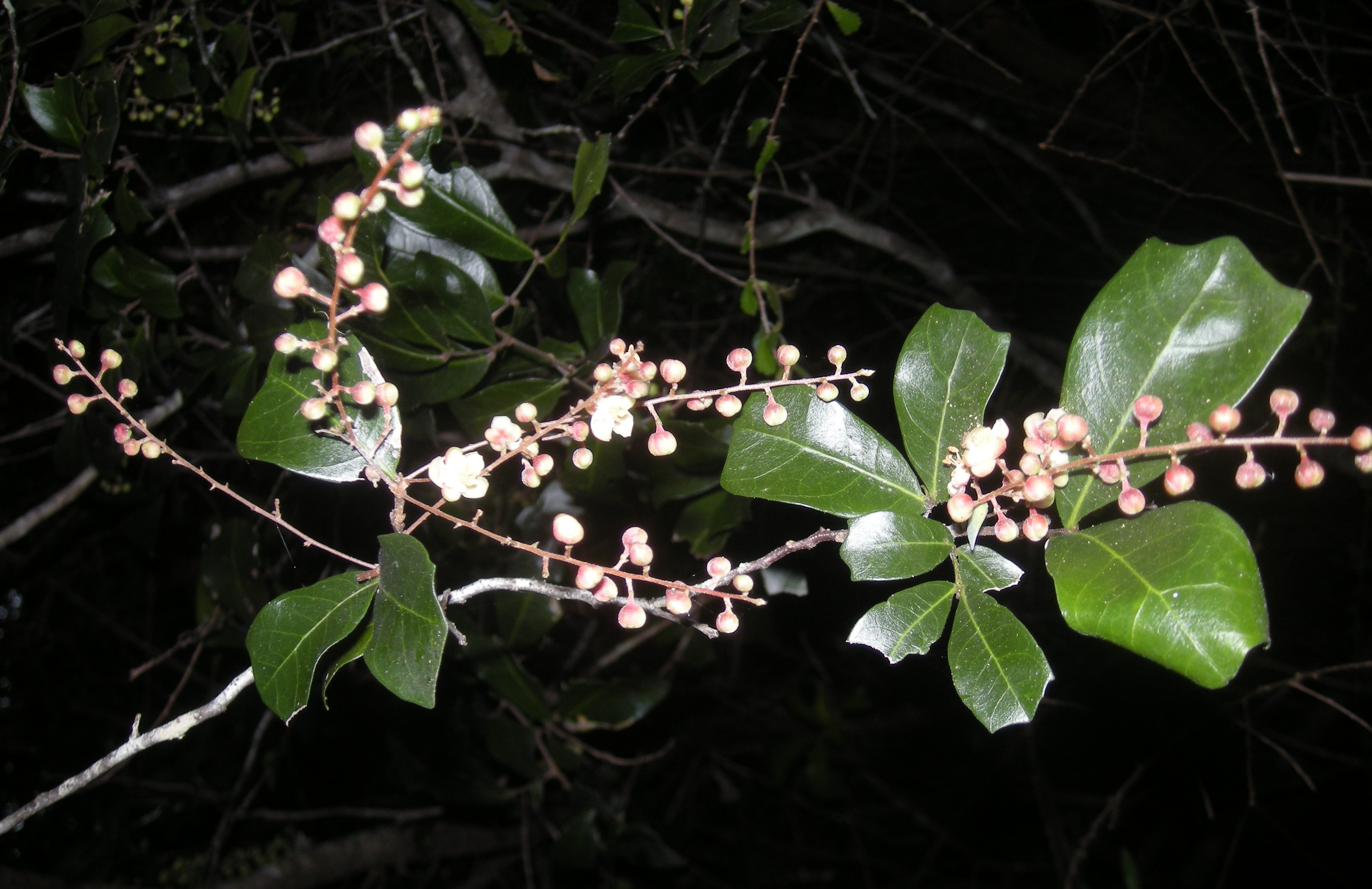
Flowers

Cupaniopsis wadsworthii, sometimes commonly named duckfoot, or dwarf tuckeroo, is a species of flowering plant in the soapberry family and is endemic to Queensland. It is a slender shrub or small tree with paripinnate leaves with two to eight broadly wedge-shaped or broadly lobed leaflets, and separate male and female flowers arranged in raceme-like thyrses, the fruit a capsule with a seed with an orange aril.

== Description ==
Cupaniopsis wadsworthii grows as a slender shrub up to 3 m (9.8 ft) tall or a small tree up to 12 m (39 ft) tall with a dbh of up to 50 cm (20 in). The leaves are paripinnate 45–120 mm (1.8–4.7 in) long on a petiole 2–25 mm (0.079–0.984 in) long, with two to eight broadly wedge-shaped leaflets, 20–75 mm (0.79–2.95 in) long and 7–45 mm (0.28–1.77 in) wide, sometimes with two or three lobes. The leaflets form a distinctive triangular shape, broad at the tip and terminating in a point at the petiole. The flowers are borne on a raceme-like thyrse, 50–125 mm (2.0–4.9 in) long, each flower on a pedicel 1.5–4 mm (0.059–0.157 in) long. The five sepal lobes are 4 mm (0.16 in) long and hairy on the outside, the usually five petals are egg-shaped, 1.5–4.6 mm (0.059–0.181 in) long and densely hairy. Male flowers have eight stamens and female flowers have eight staminodes and an ovary with three locules. The fruit is an orange to yellow capsule with three lobes, each lobe with a glossy dark brown seed covered in a bright orange aril. Fruits ripen from October to December, attracting many birds.

== Taxonomy ==
This species was first formally described in 1863 by Ferdinand von Mueller, who gave it the name Harpullia wadsworthii in his Fragmenta Phytographiae Australiae from specimens collected near Rockhampton. In 1879, Ludwig Radlkofer transferred the species to Cupaniopsis as C. wadsworthii.

== Distribution and habitat ==
Cupaniopsis wadsworthii usually grows on hills in rocky soil in rainforests and seasonally dry rainforests at altitudes up to 740 m (2,430 ft), from Townsville to Maryborough, including on Magnetic Island, in central eastern Queensland.
