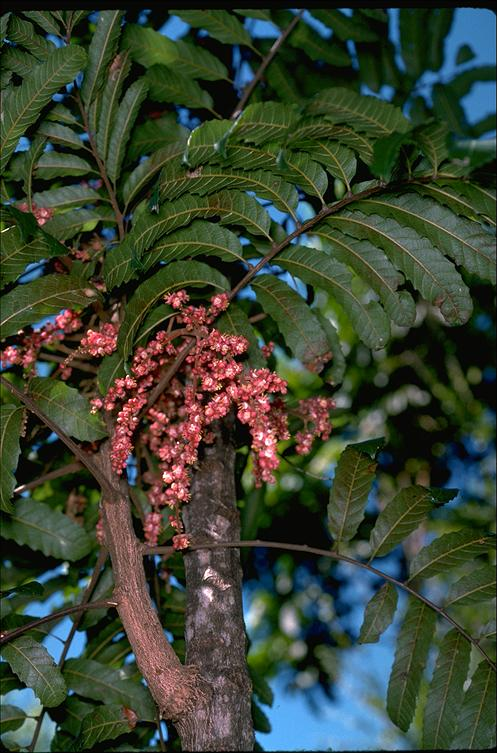
- In Mullumbimby Rainforest Walk

Scientific classification
- Kingdom: Plantae
- Clade: Tracheophytes
- Clade: Angiosperms
- Clade: Eudicots
- Clade: Rosids
- Order: Sapindales
- Family: Sapindaceae
- Genus: Cupaniopsis
- Species: C. newmanii

Binomial name
- Cupaniopsis newmanii S.T.Reynolds

= Cupaniopsis newmanii =

Species of tree

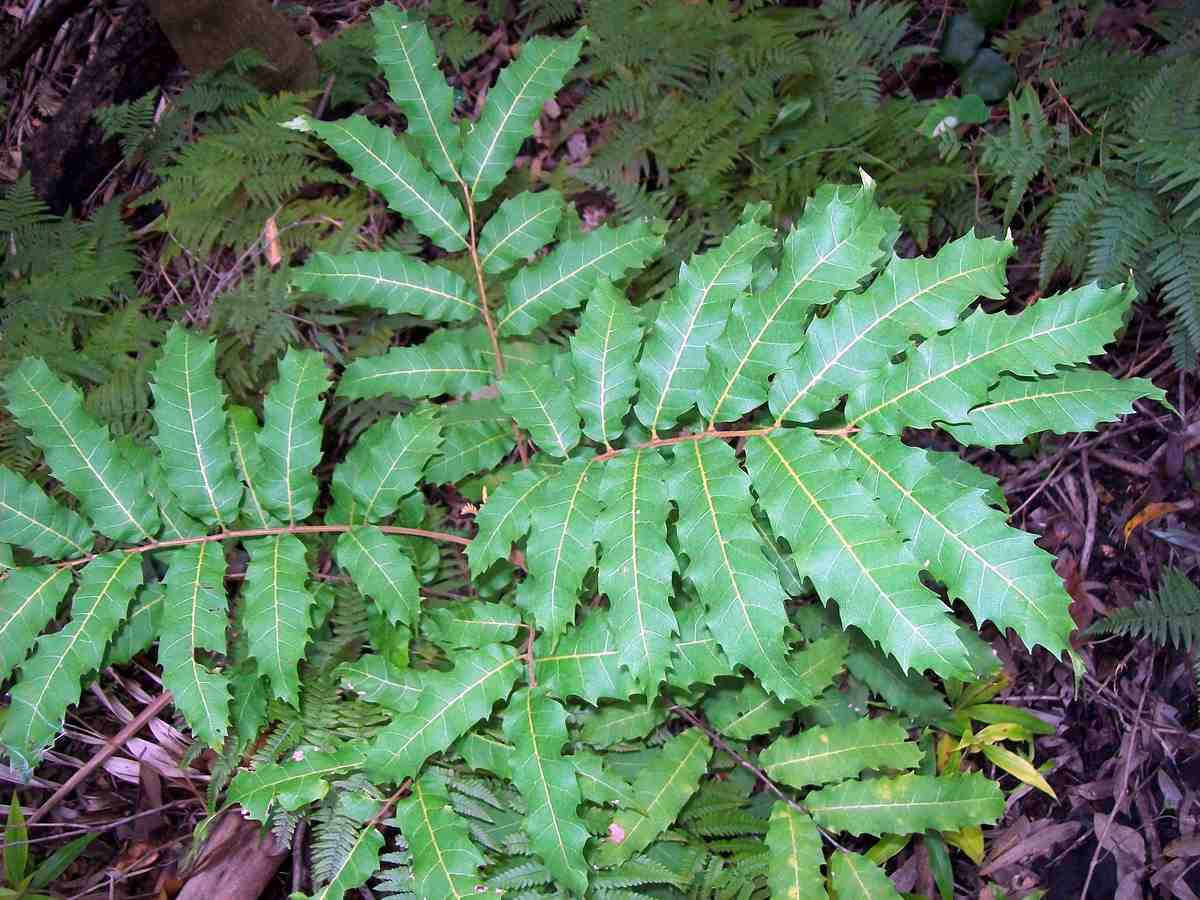
Leaf detail at Dee Why

Cupaniopsis newmanii, commonly known as long-leaved tuckeroo, is a species of flowering tree in the soapberry family and is endemic to eastern Australia. It is a rainforest tree with paripinnate leaves with 16 to 24 narrowly egg-shaped to elliptic leaflets, and separate male and female flowers arranged in panicles, the fruit a rust-coloured capsule flushed with pink.

== Description ==
Cupaniopsis newmanii is a shrub or small tree typically growing to a height of up to 6 m (20 ft) with a dbh of 5 cm (2.0 in). The trunk is crooked, and not buttressed, with dark grey or black bark, marked with vertical lines and cracks. Small branches are relatively thick, and the shoots and branchlets covered with rusty brown hairs. The leaves are paripinnate with 16 to 24 narrowly egg-shaped to elliptic leaflets 60–180 mm (2.4–7.1 in) long and 25–60 mm (0.98–2.36 in) wide, the leaf rhachis 140–370 mm (5.5–14.6 in) long. The leaves are leathery and glabrous, with the edges irregularly toothed.

The flowers are arranged in leaf axils in panicles 100–210 mm (3.9–8.3 in) long on a hairy peduncle, each flower on a pedicel 1–3 mm (0.039–0.118 in) long. The sepal lobes are 5–7 mm (0.20–0.28 in) long and covered with silky hairs on the outside. The petals are egg-shaped, 2.5 mm (0.098 in) long and pinkish-mauve. Flowering occurs from July to October and the fruit is a rust-coloured capsule 18–24 mm (0.71–0.94 in) long and 16–27 mm (0.63–1.06 in) wide, flushed with pink and with a cup-shaped, yellow aril.

== Taxonomy ==
Cupaniopsis newmanii was first formally described in 1984 by Sally T. Reynolds in the journal Austrobaileya from specimens collected in the Numinbah Valley in 1978. The specific epithet (newmanii) honours John Newman (1931–1980), a cousin of Reynolds.

== Distribution and habitat ==
Long-leaved tuckeroo grows on the margin of rainforest between Mullumbimby in New South Wales and Gympie in south-eastern Queensland.
