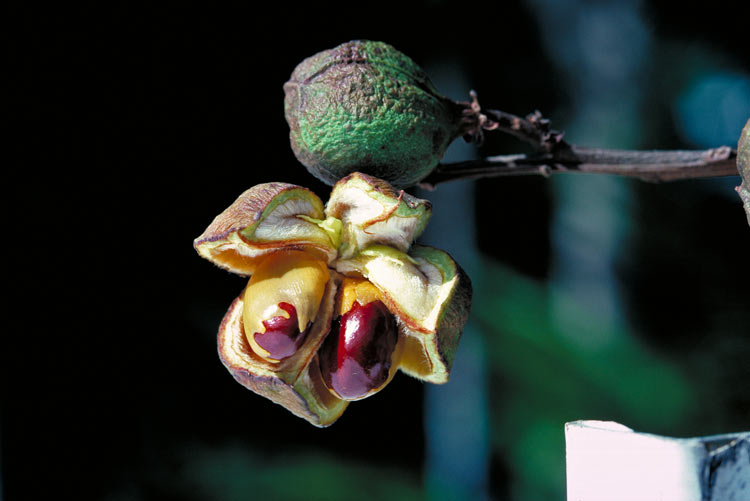
- Fruit

Scientific classification
- Kingdom: Plantae
- Clade: Tracheophytes
- Clade: Angiosperms
- Clade: Eudicots
- Clade: Rosids
- Order: Sapindales
- Family: Sapindaceae
- Genus: Cupaniopsis
- Species: C. dallachyi

Binomial name
- Cupaniopsis dallachyi S.T.Reynolds

Synonyms
- Cupaniopsis sp. aff. C. dallachyi

= Cupaniopsis dallachyi =

Species of tree

Cupaniopsis dallachyi is a species of flowering plant in the soapberry family and is endemic to north-east Queensland. It is a tree with paripinnate leaves with 4 to 14 elliptic to egg-shaped leaflets with domatia along the midrib, separate male and female flowers arranged in panicles, the fruit a brown capsule containing a reddish-brown seed with a brown aril.

== Description ==
Cupaniopsis dallachyi is tree that typically grows to a height of up to 25 m (82 ft), its branchlets sometimes covered with fine, soft, rust-coloured hairs. The leaves are paripinnate with 4 to 14 elliptic to egg-shaped leaflets with the narrower end towards the base, 60–130 mm (2.4–5.1 in) long, 30–55 mm (1.2–2.2 in) wide on a rhachis 55–175 mm (2.2–6.9 in) long. There are usually small domatia along the whole micreb of the leaflets. Separate male and female flowers are borne in panicles. The sepals have more or less round lobes about 3 mm (0.12 in) long. The petals are about 1 mm (0.039 in) long. The fruit is brown and about 20–30 mm (0.79–1.18 in) long and 20–25 mm (0.79–0.98 in) wide containing seeds with a brown aril.

== Taxonomy ==
Cupaniopsis dallachyi was first formally described in 1985 by Sally T. Reynolds in the Flora of Australia from specimens collected near Jaggan in 1980. The specific epithet (dallachyi) honours John Dallachy.

== Distribution and habitat ==
This species of Cupaniopsis grows in rainforest from near Daintree to south of Ravenshoe in north Queensland, at altitudes between 150–750 m (490–2,460 ft).
