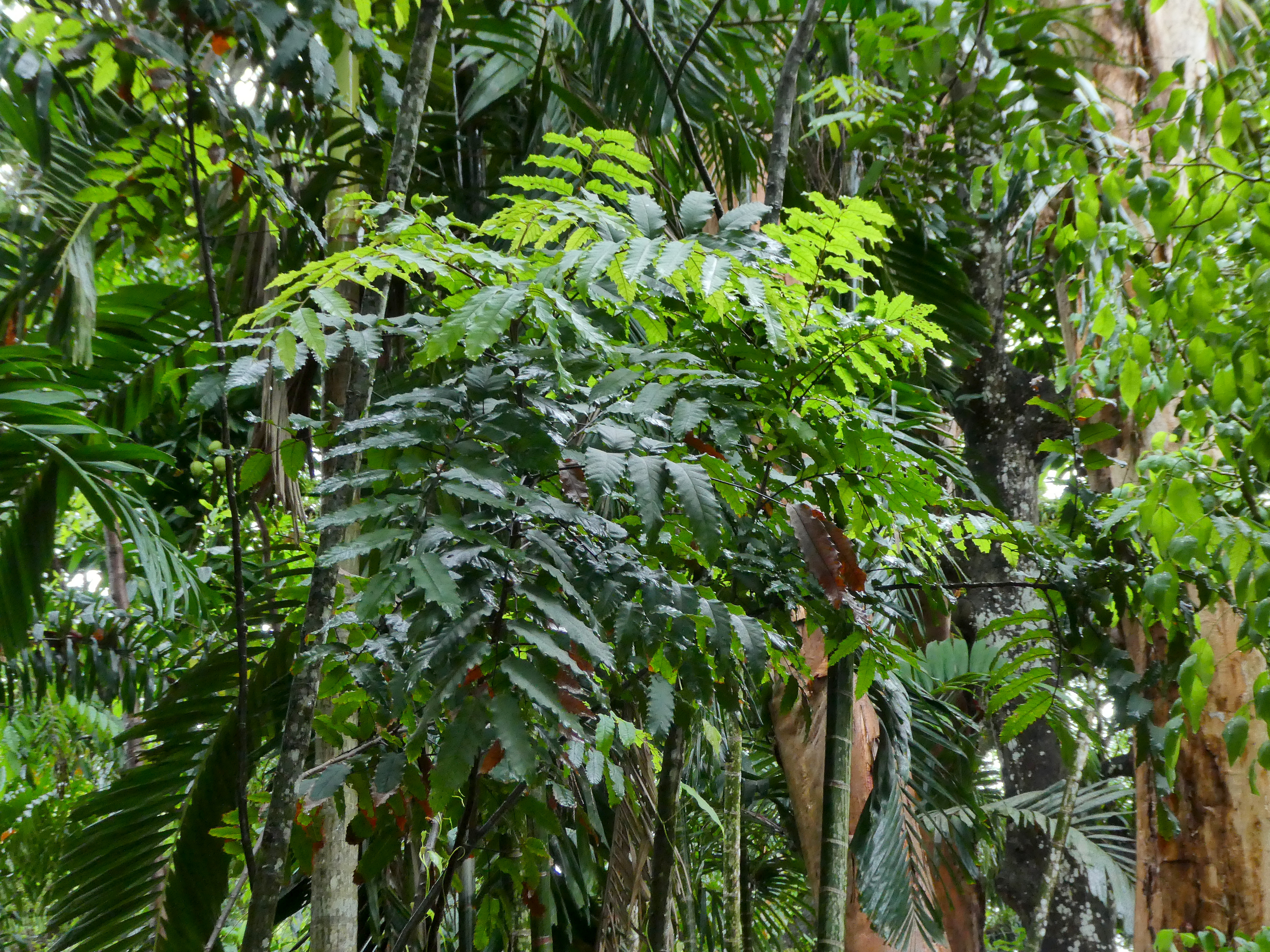
- Foliage

Conservation status
- Least Concern (IUCN 3.1)
- Least Concern (NCA)

Scientific classification
- Kingdom: Plantae
- Clade: Tracheophytes
- Clade: Angiosperms
- Clade: Eudicots
- Clade: Rosids
- Order: Sapindales
- Family: Sapindaceae
- Genus: Cupaniopsis
- Species: C. flagelliformis

Binomial name
- Cupaniopsis flagelliformis (F.M.Bailey) Radlk.

Synonyms
- Cupania flagelliformis F.M.Bailey (1893); Cupania curvidentata F.M.Bailey (1899); Cupaniopsis curvidentata (F.M.Bailey) Radlk. (1924); Cupaniopsis flagelliformis var. australis S.T.Reynolds (1984)

= Cupaniopsis flagelliformis =

Brown tuckeroo

Species of flowering plant

Cupaniopsis flagelliformis, commonly known as brown tuckeroo or weeping flower tamarind, is a tree in the lychee and maple family Sapindaceae, endemic to eastern Australia. It is a small tree that inhabits tropical and sub-tropical rainforest and monsoon forest.

== Description ==
Cupaniopsis flagelliformis is a small tree growing up to 25 m (82 ft) high, with an open spreading crown. New growth is densely hairy and the twigs are puberulous. The leaves are compound and alternate, measuring up to 30 cm (12 in) long. They have 10 to 20 dentate leaflets that usually reach about 10 cm (3.9 in) by 4 cm (1.6 in), but can be much larger.

Small flowers are carried on a pendant spike up to 55 cm (22 in) long, produced either terminally or in the leaf axils. The sepals are much larger than the petals, and are red or pink. The petals are white or pink and the entire flower measures about 9 mm (0.4 in) diameter.

The red, pink or yellow fruit is a capsule about 22 mm (0.9 in) long by 26 mm (1.0 in) wide. They are densely hairy outside and silky hairy internally. They have three segments, each with a single brown or black seed that is mostly enclosed by an orange-yellow aril.

=== Phenology ===
Flowering occurs from July to January, and the fruit ripen from September to July.

== Taxonomy ==
This species was first described by the Australian botanist Frederick Manson Bailey, who published a description in the Queensland Department of Agriculture's Botany Bulletin in 1893. Bailey gave it the name Cupania flagelliformis. In a 1924 revision of the family Sapindaceae, the Bavarian botanist Ludwig Adolph Timotheus Radlkofer transferred the species from Cupania (a South American genus) to Cupaniopsis.

=== Infraspecies ===
The variety Cupaniopsis flagelliformis var. australis was described by the Australian botanist Sally T. Reynolds in 1984, and is recognised by Australian authorities, as well as the Global Biodiversity Information Facility (GBIF). Plants of the World Online and World Flora Online consider the variety a synonym of Cupaniopsis flagelliformis.

=== Etymology ===
The genus name Cupaniopsis was derived from the existing South American genus Cupania, combined with the Ancient Greek ὄψις (ópsis), meaning 'appearance'. It may be interpreted as "resembling Cupania". The species epithet flagelliformis is a combination of the Latin words flagellum ('whip'), and fōrma ('shape'), which is a reference to the whip-like appearance of the inflorescence.

== Distribution and habitat ==
The brown tuckeroo inhabits tropical and sub-tropical rainforest and monsoon forest, where it grows as an understorey tree. The altitudinal range is from sea level to about 1,100 m (3,600 ft).

It occurs in four disjunct populations, from the top of Cape York Peninsula to northeastern New South Wales. The first group is found on Prince of Wales Island and on the tip of Cape York north of Bamaga. The next grouping is in and around Kutini-Payamu National Park, roughly from the Olive River to Lockhart River. The third and largest cluster is about 400 km (250 mi) south of Lockhart River, from near Cape Tribulation to the area around Ingham. The final, and most disjunct, group occurs about 1,300 km (810 mi) to the south, in the far southeast of Queensland and the far northeast of New South Wales.

== Conservation ==
This species is listed by both the International Union for Conservation of Nature (IUCN) and the Queensland Department of Environment and Science as least concern. The IUCN cites a wide distribution and the lack of any identified current or future threats as the basis for its assessment.

== Cultivation ==
The tree is becoming popular as a cultivated plant, as it is easy to grow and has attractive foliage, flowers and fruit. In the city of Cairns about 20 of these trees have been planted as street trees. The brown tuckeroo is also available from the Cairns Regional Council for approved revegetation projects in Cairns.

== Gallery ==
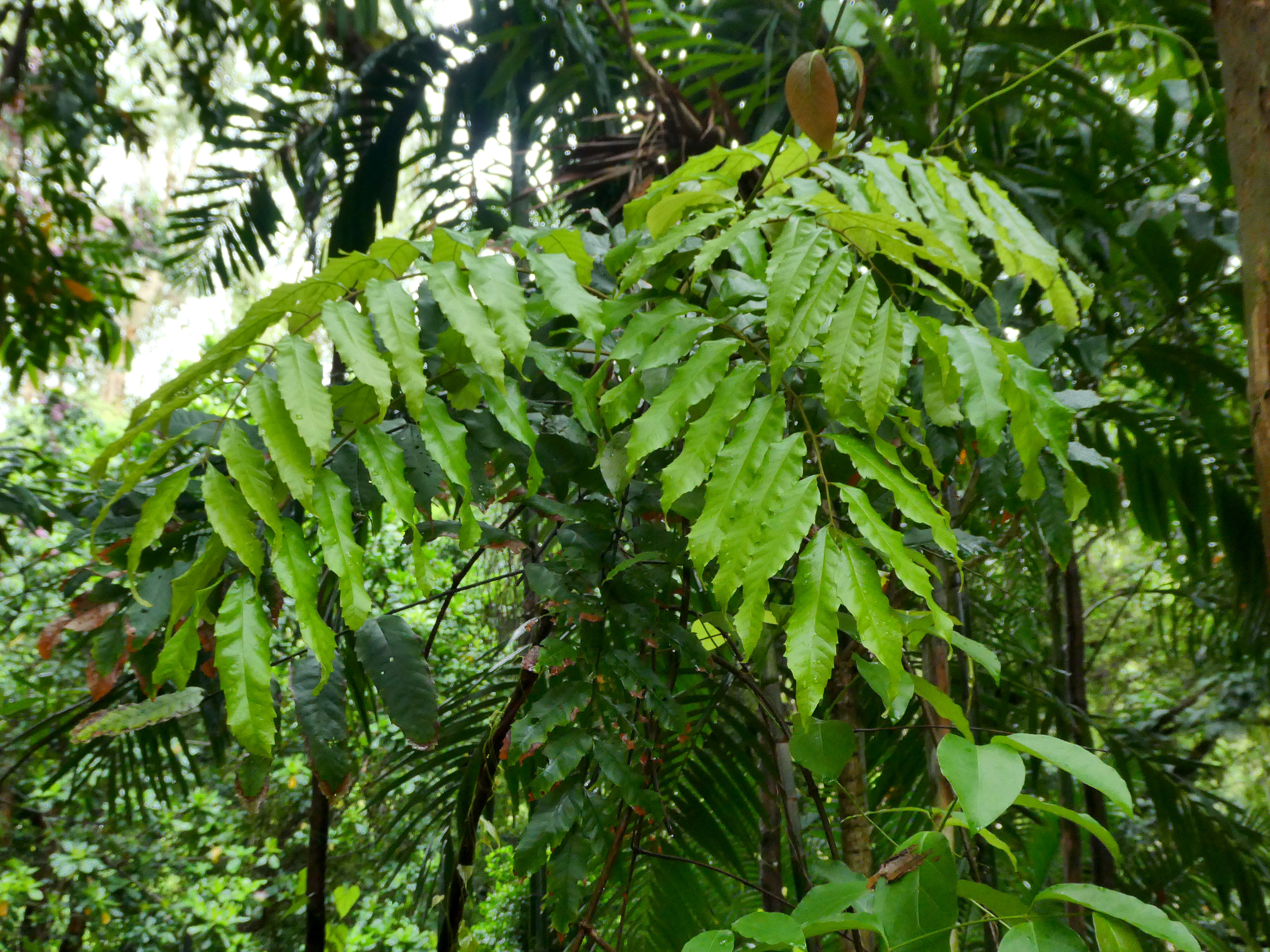
Small tree in Cairns

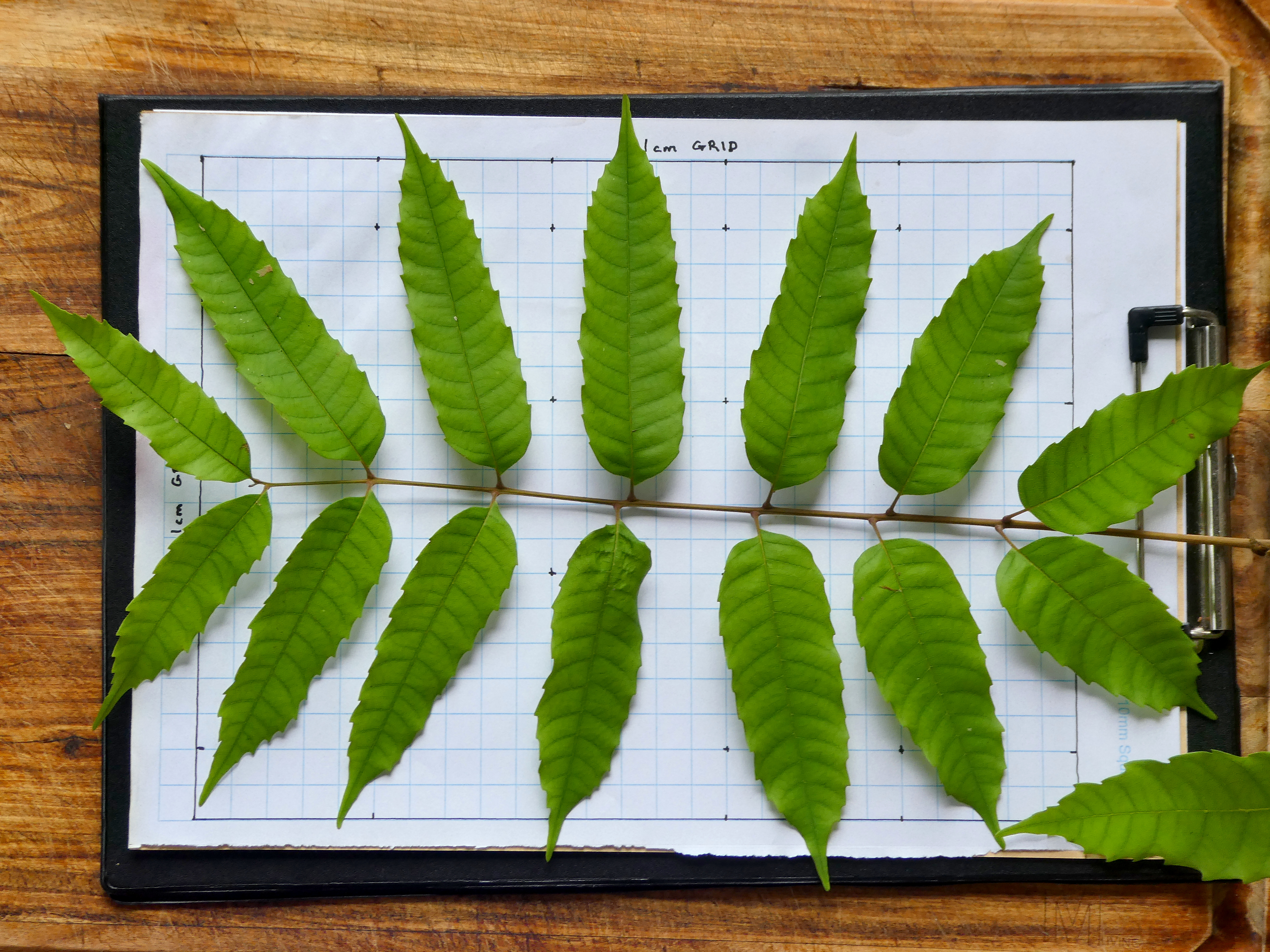
Compound leaf

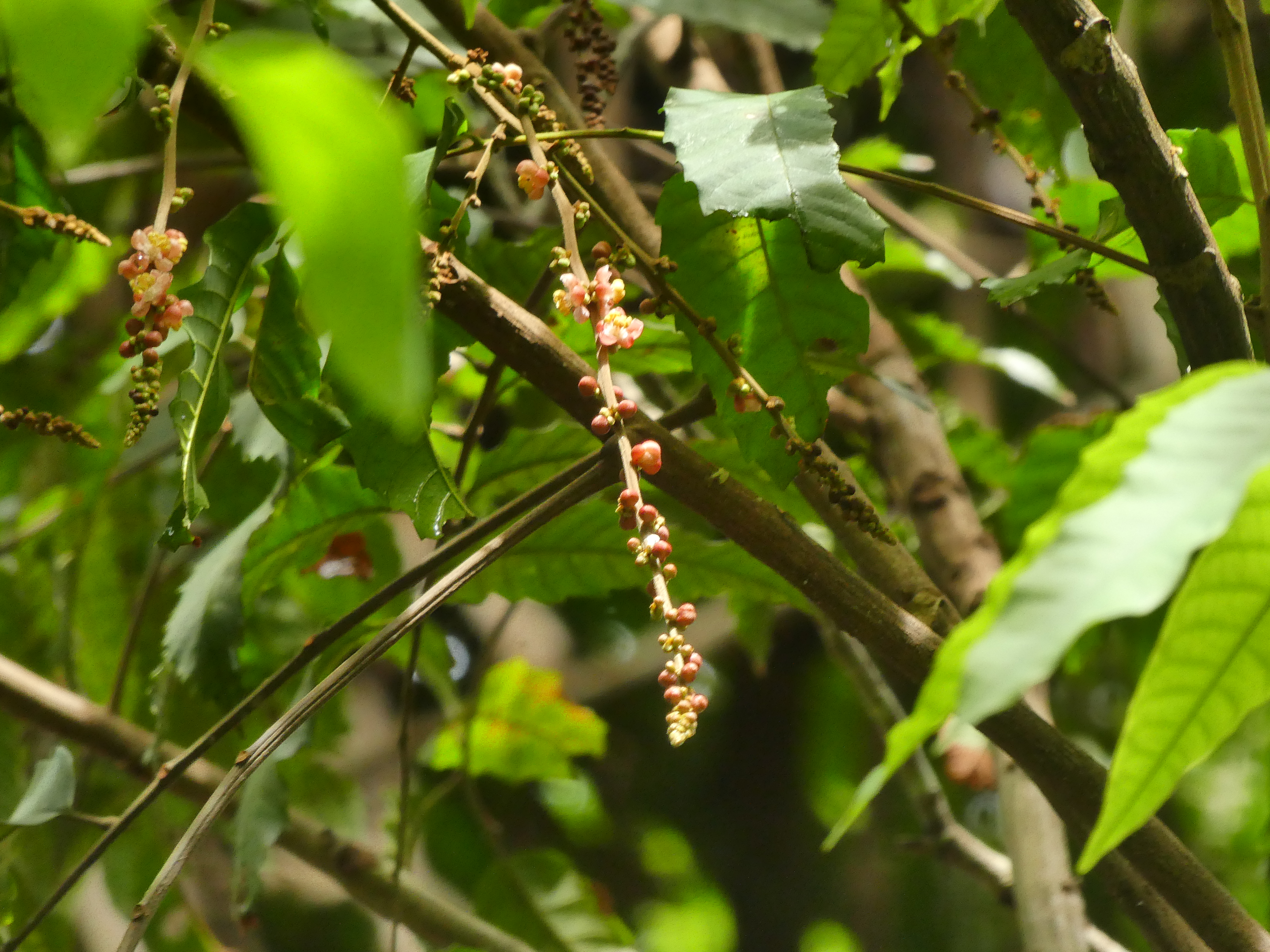
Inflorescence

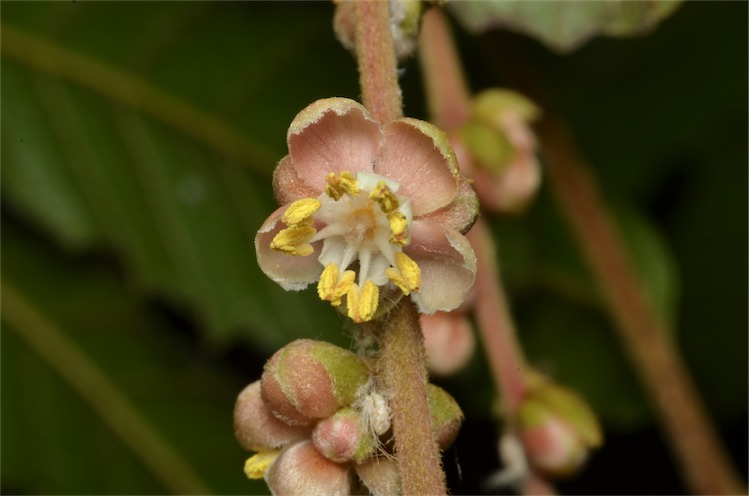
Flower close-up

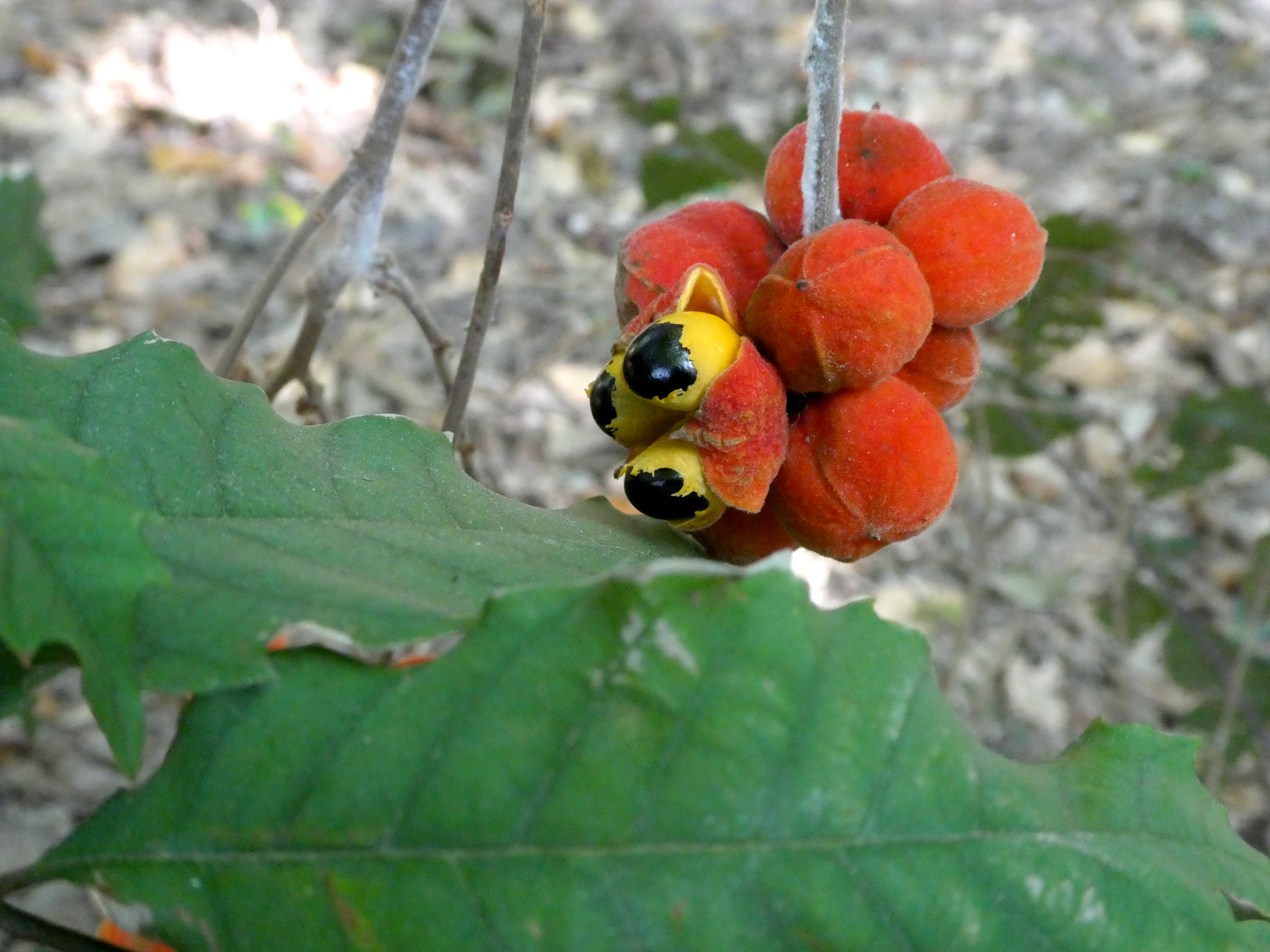
Dehiscing fruit
