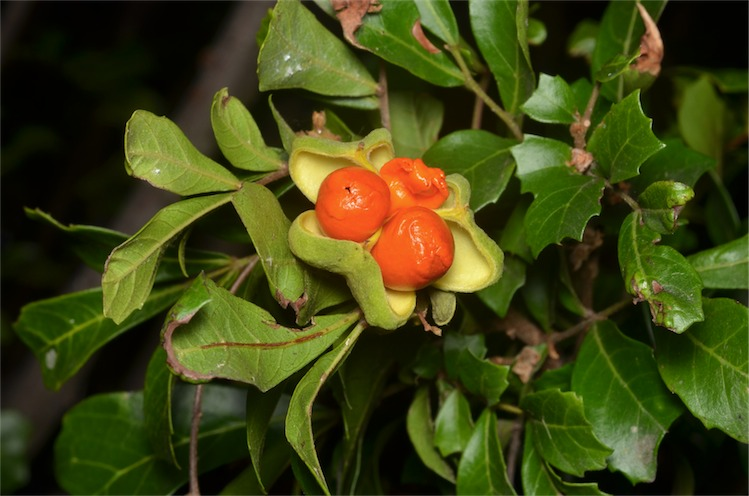
- In the North Coast Regional Botanic Garden

Conservation status
- Vulnerable (EPBC Act)

Scientific classification
- Kingdom: Plantae
- Clade: Tracheophytes
- Clade: Angiosperms
- Clade: Eudicots
- Clade: Rosids
- Order: Sapindales
- Family: Sapindaceae
- Genus: Cupaniopsis
- Species: C. shirleyana

Binomial name
- Cupaniopsis shirleyana (F.M.Bailey) Radlk.

= Cupaniopsis shirleyana =

Species of tree

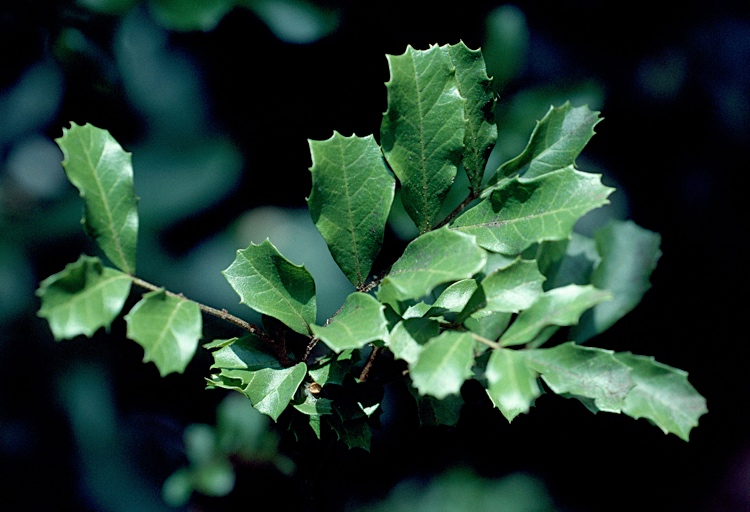
Foliage in the ANBG

Cupaniopsis shirleyana, commonly known as wedge-leaved tuckeroo, is a species of flowering plant in the soapberry family and is endemic to Queensland. It is a small tree with paripinnate leaves, usually with 6 to 14 wedge-shaped leaflets with serrated edges, and separate male and female flowers arranged in spikes, the fruit a more or less spherical orange capsule containing a seed with an orange-red aril.

== Description ==
Cupaniopsis shirleyana is a small tree that typically grows to a height of 10 m (33 ft), its young parts covered with soft hairs. The leaves are 45–80 mm (1.8–3.1 in) long and paripinnate with 6 to 14 wedge-shaped leaflets 80–55 mm (3.1–2.2 in) long, 8–30 mm (0.31–1.18 in) wide with a serrated edges, on a petiole 2–5 mm (0.079–0.197 in) long. The lowermost leaflets are stipule-like. The flowers are borne in spikes 50–180 mm (2.0–7.1 in) long, and are sessile or on a pedicel up to 1 mm (0.039 in) long. The sepal lobes are 4–5 mm (0.16–0.20 in) long and covered with soft hairs, the petals egg-shaped, 2 mm (0.079 in) long and wide, and hairy on the outside. The fruit is a sessile, more or less spherical drupe 15–17 mm (0.59–0.67 in) long and wide, covered with velvety hairs, and the fruit contains a seed with an orange-red aril.

== Taxonomy ==
This species was first formally described in 1888 by Frederick Manson Bailey, who gave it the name Cupania shirleyana in a supplement to A Synopsis of the Queensland Flora from specimens collected near Sankey's Scrub near Brisbane. In 1924, Ludwig Radlkofer transferred the species to Cupaniopsis as C. shirleyana. The specific epithet (shirleyana) honours John Francis Shirley for his "interest in the Field Naturalist Section of the Royal Society of Queensland".

== Distribution and habitat ==
Wedge-leaved tuckeroo grows in dry rainforest in scrubby slopes, scree slopes and rocky streams at altitudes between 60 and 550 m (200 and 1,800 ft) above sea level from near Brisbane to Curtis Island in south-eastern Queensland.

== Conservation status ==
Cupaniopsis sirleyana is listed as a "vulnerable" under the Australian Government Environment Protection and Biodiversity Conservation Act 1999 and the Queensland Government Nature Conservation Act 1992.
