= Ixora oreogena =

Ixora bush

Conservation status
- Least Concern (NCA)

Scientific classification
- Kingdom: Plantae
- Clade: Tracheophytes
- Clade: Angiosperms
- Clade: Eudicots
- Clade: Asterids
- Order: Gentianales
- Family: Rubiaceae
- Genus: Ixora
- Species: I. oreogena

Binomial name
- Ixora oreogena S.T.Reynolds & P.I.Forst.

Species of flowering plant

Ixora oreogena, commonly known as ixora bush, is a plant in the coffee family Rubiaceae endemic to Queensland, Australia. It is a shrub or small tree from 4 to 18 m in height. The leaves are glabrous and usually about 9.5 cm long and 3 cm wide, with a petiole about 5–10 mm long. The flowers have long slender corolla tubes and 4 petals. The fruits are black, glabrous, sub-globose, and measure up to 18 mm long by 22 mm wide.
