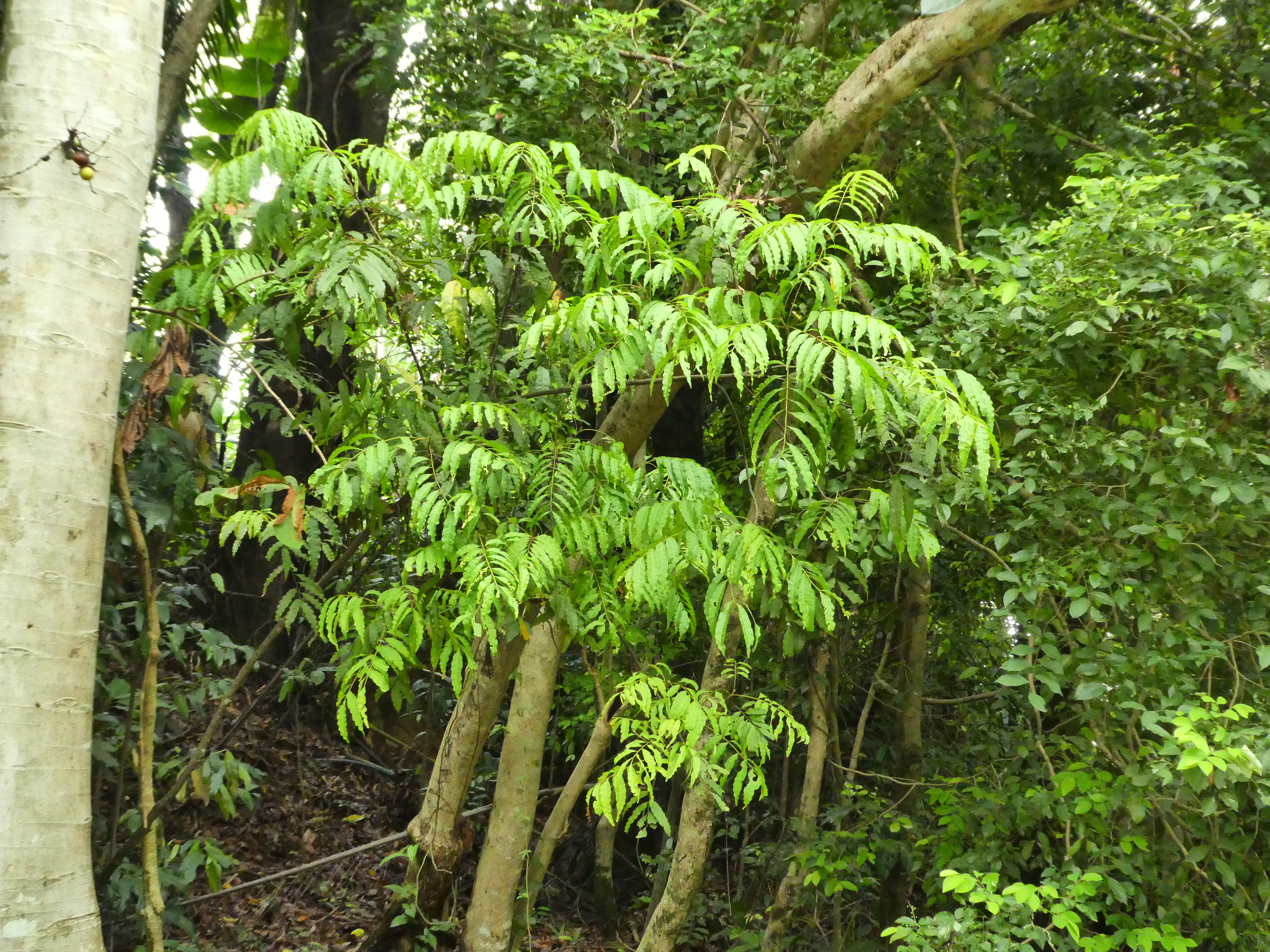
- Sapling

Conservation status
- Least Concern (NCA)
- Least Concern (IUCN 3.1)

Scientific classification
- Kingdom: Plantae
- Clade: Tracheophytes
- Clade: Angiosperms
- Clade: Eudicots
- Clade: Rosids
- Order: Sapindales
- Family: Sapindaceae
- Genus: Cupaniopsis
- Species: C. foveolata

Binomial name
- Cupaniopsis foveolata (F.Muell.) Radlk.

Synonyms
- Cupania foveolata F.Muell.

= Cupaniopsis foveolata =

Narrow-leaved tuckeroo

Species of flowering plant

Cupaniopsis foveolata, commonly known as narrow-leaved tuckeroo, white tamarind or toothed tuckeroo, is a plant in the maple and lychee family Sapindaceae found in eastern Queensland and New South Wales, Australia. It is a medium sized tree, first described in 1875. It has the conservation status of least concern.

== Description ==
Cupaniopsis foveolata is a tree growing to about 25 m (82 ft) high and 30 cm (12 in) diameter. New growth is covered in fine hairs and twigs have numerous lenticels. The compound leaves can grow to about 28 cm (11 in) long (including the petiole), with 4–8 or 10 leaflets arranged alternately. The leaflets are narrowly elliptic to ovate, obtuse at the base and bluntly accuminate at the tip. They measure up to about 12 cm (4.7 in) long and 2.5 cm (0.98 in) wide with scalloped margins.

The inflorescences are panicles produced either terminally, from the leaf axils or directly from the old wood of the branches. They are held erect and measure about 10 cm (3.9 in) wide and long. They carry numerous cream-coloured flowers of about 6 mm (0.24 in) diameter held on pedicels up to 4 mm (0.16 in) long. The calyx is five-lobed, there are five sessile, hairy petals about 2 mm (0.08 in) long, and there are eight stamens. The ovary is 3-locular with one ovule per locule, the stigma is persitant.

The fruit is a yellow/orange 3-segmented capsule up to 25 mm (0.98 in) wide, broadest at the apex (i.e. the furthest point from the attachment to the branch). It is glabrous outside and finely hairy on the inner surfaces. Each segment contains a single black ellipsoid seed that is mostly enclosed within a yellow aril.

=== Phenology ===
Flowering occurs from May to September, and fruit appear from December to January.

== Taxonomy ==
This species was first described as Cupania foveolata by the German-Australian botanist Ferdinand von Mueller. His description was based on material collected near the Macleay River in New South Wales, and also from Rockingham Bay in Queensland, and it was published in his book Fragmenta phytographiæ Australiæ in 1875. In 1879 the German botanist Ludwig Radlkofer created the genus Cupaniopsis to accommodate species from the Asia-Pacific region, and he transferred this species into the new genus.

== Distribution and habitat ==
The natural range of this tree is the northeastern coastal regions of Queensland from the McIlwraith Range on Cape York Peninsula, southwards to the area around Mackay. It grows as an understorey tree in rainforest on a variety of soils.

== Ecology ==
The seeds are eaten by a number of birds including figbirds (Sphecotheres vieilloti), spotted catbirds (Ailuroedus maculosus), and graceful honeyeaters (Microptilotis gracilis).

== Conservation ==
This species is listed as least concern under the Queensland Government's Nature Conservation Act, and also by the International Union for Conservation of Nature (IUCN).

== Gallery ==
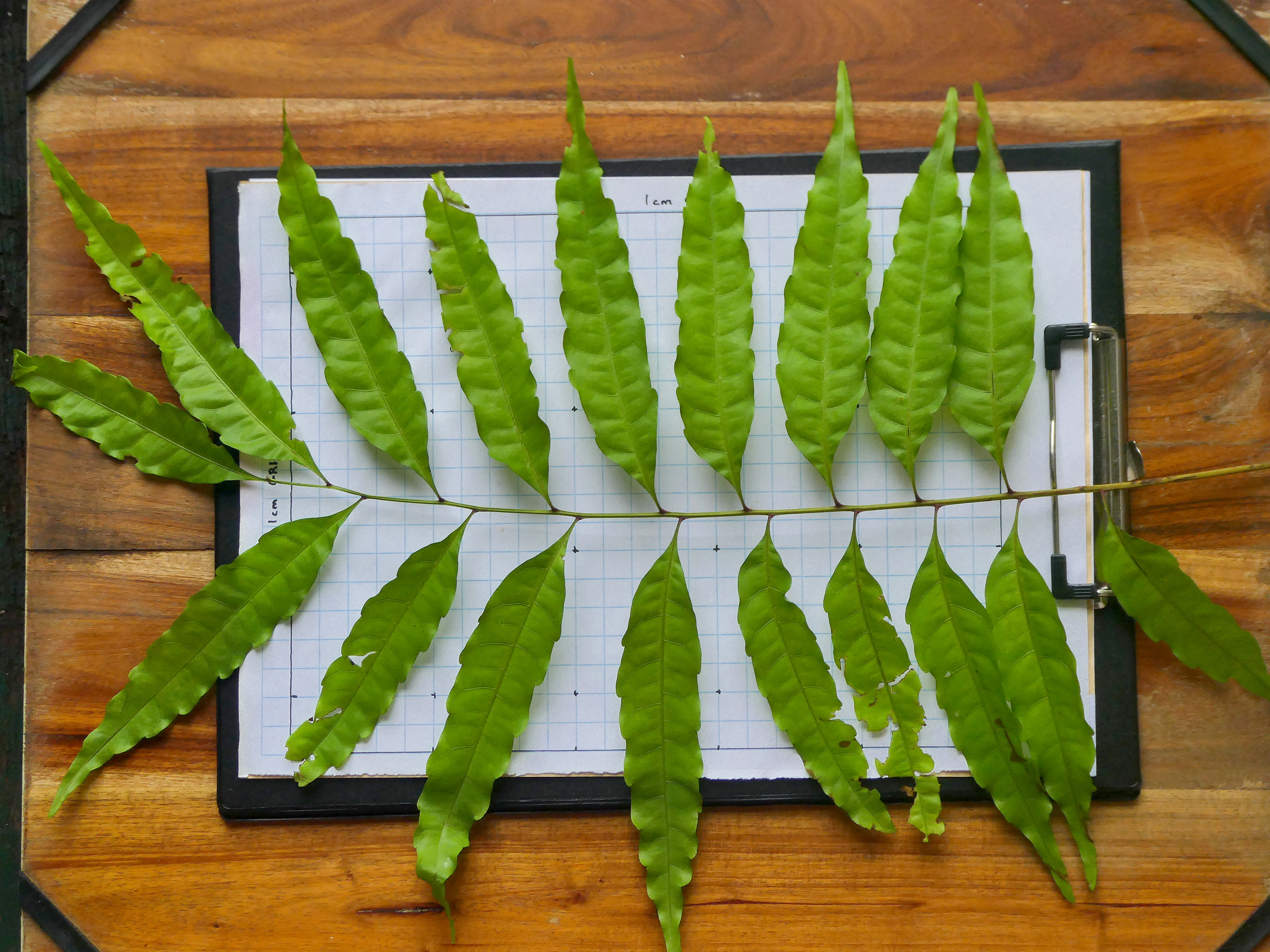
Compound leaf, detail

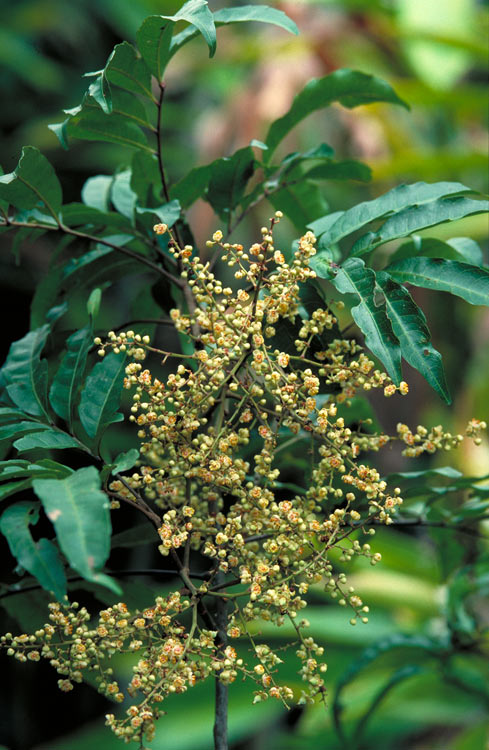
Flowers

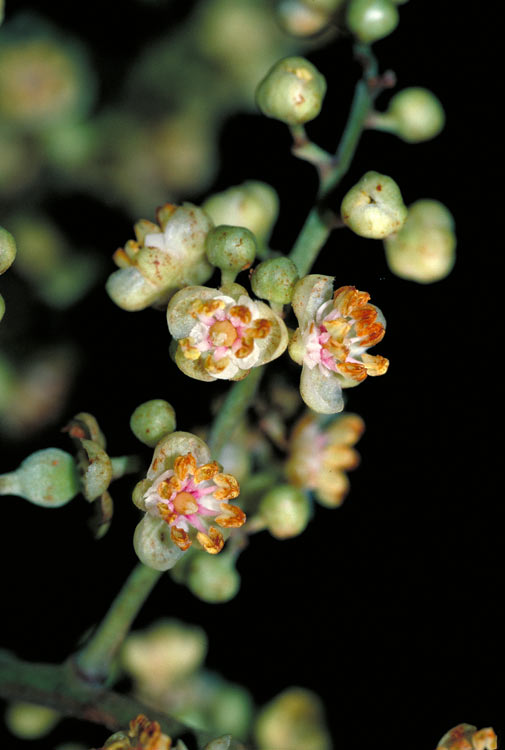
Flowers, detail

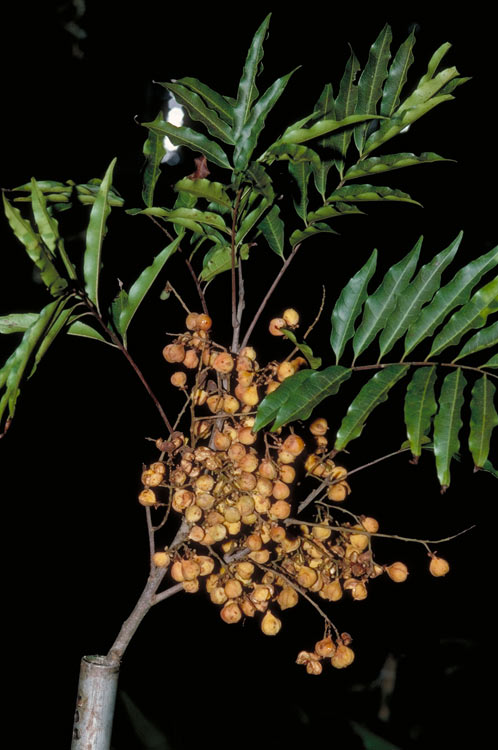
Fruit
