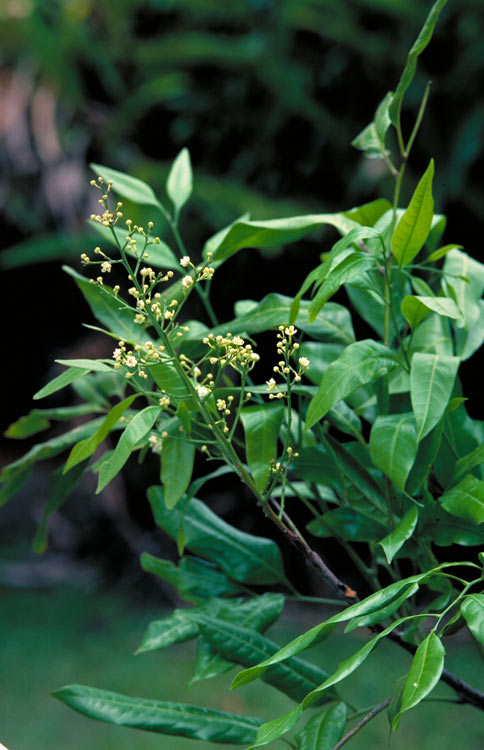
- Leaves and flowers

Scientific classification
- Kingdom: Plantae
- Clade: Tracheophytes
- Clade: Angiosperms
- Clade: Eudicots
- Clade: Rosids
- Order: Sapindales
- Family: Sapindaceae
- Genus: Cupaniopsis
- Species: C. cooperorum

Binomial name
- Cupaniopsis cooperorum P.I.Forst.

= Cupaniopsis cooperorum =

Cooper's puzzle

Species of tree

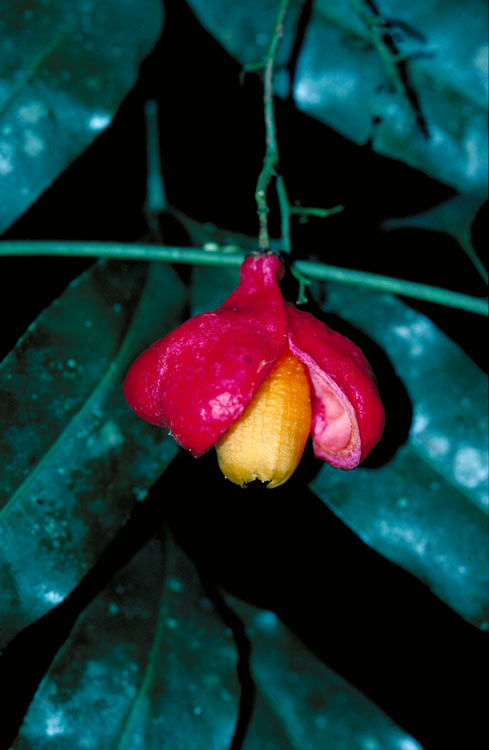
Capsule and seed

Cupaniopsis cooperorum, commonly known as Cooper's puzzle, is a species of flowering plant in the soapberry family and is endemic to Queensland. It is a small tree with paripinnate leaves with 8 to 14 lance-shaped leaflets with the narrower end towards the base, separate male and female, cream-coloured flowers arranged in panicles, the fruit an orange-pink capsule.

== Description ==
Cupaniopsis cooperorum is small tree that typically grows to a height of up to 7 m (23 ft) and often has many stems. The leaves are paripinnate with about 8 to 14 leaflets on a petiole 52–70 mm (2.0–2.8 in) long, the leaflets lance-shaped with the narrower end towards the base, 47–170 mm (1.9–6.7 in) long 15–55 mm (0.59–2.17 in) wide on a rhachis 160–190 mm (6.3–7.5 in) long and the edges wavy. Separate male and female flowers are borne in panicles 20–110 mm (0.79–4.33 in) long, each flower on a pedicel 2–6 mm (0.079–0.236 in) long. The sepals have three large lobes 2.0–2.5 mm (0.079–0.098 in) long and two smaller lobes. The petals are about 1.5 mm (0.059 in) long with hairy glands on the inner surface and there are 8 stamens. The fruit is orange-pink and about 15–20 mm (0.59–0.79 in) long and wide. The seeds are glossy black and almost covered an orange aril.

== Taxonomy ==
Cupaniopsis cooperorum was first formally described in 2002 by Paul Irwin Forster in the journal Austrobaileya from specimens collected in the Wooroonooran National Park in 2002. The specific epithet (cooperorum) honours the botanist Wendy Elizabeth Cooper and her husband, William "Bill" Cooper (1934–2015).

== Distribution and habitat ==
Cooper's puzzle grows in vineforest on red basalt soils on the Atherton Tableland at altitudes between 650–750 m (2,130–2,460 ft).
