= Syzygium wilsonii =

- Flowers and foliage

Conservation status
- Least Concern (NCA)

Scientific classification
- Kingdom: Plantae
- Clade: Tracheophytes
- Clade: Angiosperms
- Clade: Eudicots
- Clade: Rosids
- Order: Myrtales
- Family: Myrtaceae
- Genus: Syzygium
- Species: S. wilsonii

Binomial name
- Syzygium wilsonii (F.Muell.) B.Hyland

Subspecies
- Syzygium wilsonii subsp. epigaeum; Syzygium wilsonii subsp. wilsonii

Synonyms
- Eugenia wilsonii F.Muell.

Species of flowering plant

Syzygium wilsonii, commonly known as powderpuff lilly-pilly, is a species of plant in the family Myrtaceae endemic to northeast Queensland, Australia. It is a rainforest tree, first described in 1865. It has a conservation status of least concern.

== Description ==
Syzygium wilsonii is a tree that grows to about 5–6 m (16–20 ft) in height, although it will flower when much smaller. The reddish brown trunk can reach 5 cm (2.0 in) diameter, and is never buttressed. The petioles (leaf stems) average about 4 mm (0.2 in) long, the leaves about 13 cm (5.1 in) long and 4 cm (1.6 in) wide. They are narrowly ovate in shape and have lateral veins that are sometimes difficult to discern.

Inflorescences are dense umbels or panicles which occur at the tips of the branches or in the leaf axils. The flowers are generally red but can vary from pink to scarlet to mauve. They have four petals about 3 mm (0.12 in) diameter. Stamens are numerous; the ovary has two locules, or chambers, with up to 20 ovules each.

The fruit is a white or cream berry up to 18 mm (0.7 in) long and 16 mm (0.6 in) wide, with persistent calyx lobes at the apex. It contains a single seed.

== Distribution ==
The natural range is from the Daintree River to about Ingham, where it grows in undisturbed rainforest from sea level to about 800 m (2,600 ft).

== Taxonomy ==
This plant was first described as Eugenia wilsonii in 1865 by Ferdinand von Mueller, based on material collected by John Dallachy at Rockingham Bay. In 1985, Bernard Hyland published a 164-page review of Australian species of Syzygium, in which he transferred Eugenia wilsonii to Syzygium.

In 2005, Lyndley Craven and Edward Sturt Biffin described the subspecies S. wilsonii subsp. epigaeum. The only significant difference between this subspecies and its parent is that it has epigeal germination.

== Conservation ==
This species is listed as least concern in the Queensland Government's WildNet database. As of September 2026, it has not been assessed by the International Union for Conservation of Nature.

== Cultivation ==
A number of cultivars have been created and have become popular in urban gardens.

== Gallery ==
Habit

Leaves

Flower buds

Flowering

Fruit
