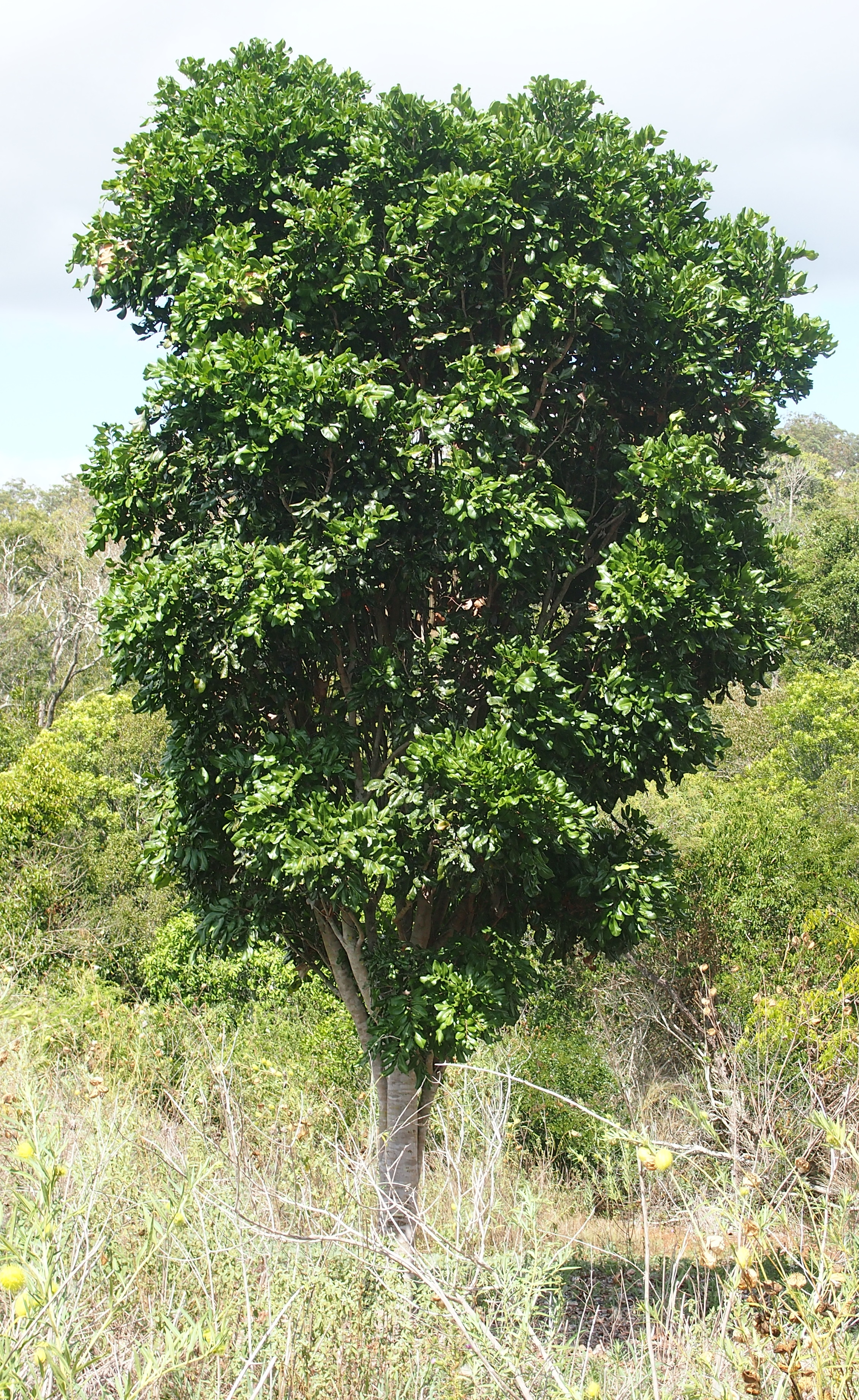

Scientific classification
- Kingdom: Plantae
- Clade: Tracheophytes
- Clade: Angiosperms
- Clade: Eudicots
- Clade: Rosids
- Order: Sapindales
- Family: Sapindaceae
- Genus: Cupaniopsis
- Species: C. anacardioides

Binomial name
- Cupaniopsis anacardioides (A.Rich.) Radlk.

Synonyms
- List: Alectryon anacardioides (A.Rich.) O.Schwarz; Alectryon bleeseri O.Schwarz; Cupania anacardioides A.Rich.; Cupania anacardioides A.Rich. var. anacardioides; Cupaniopsis anacardioides (A.Rich.) Radlk. f. anacardioides; Cupaniopsis anacardioides f. genuina Radlk.; Cupaniopsis anacardioides (A.Rich.) Radlk. var. anacardioides

= Cupaniopsis anacardioides =

Tuckeroo

Species of tree

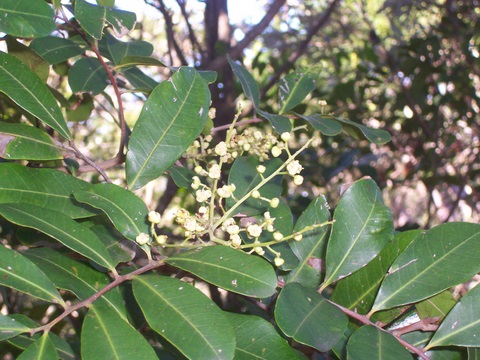
In Wyrrabalong National Park

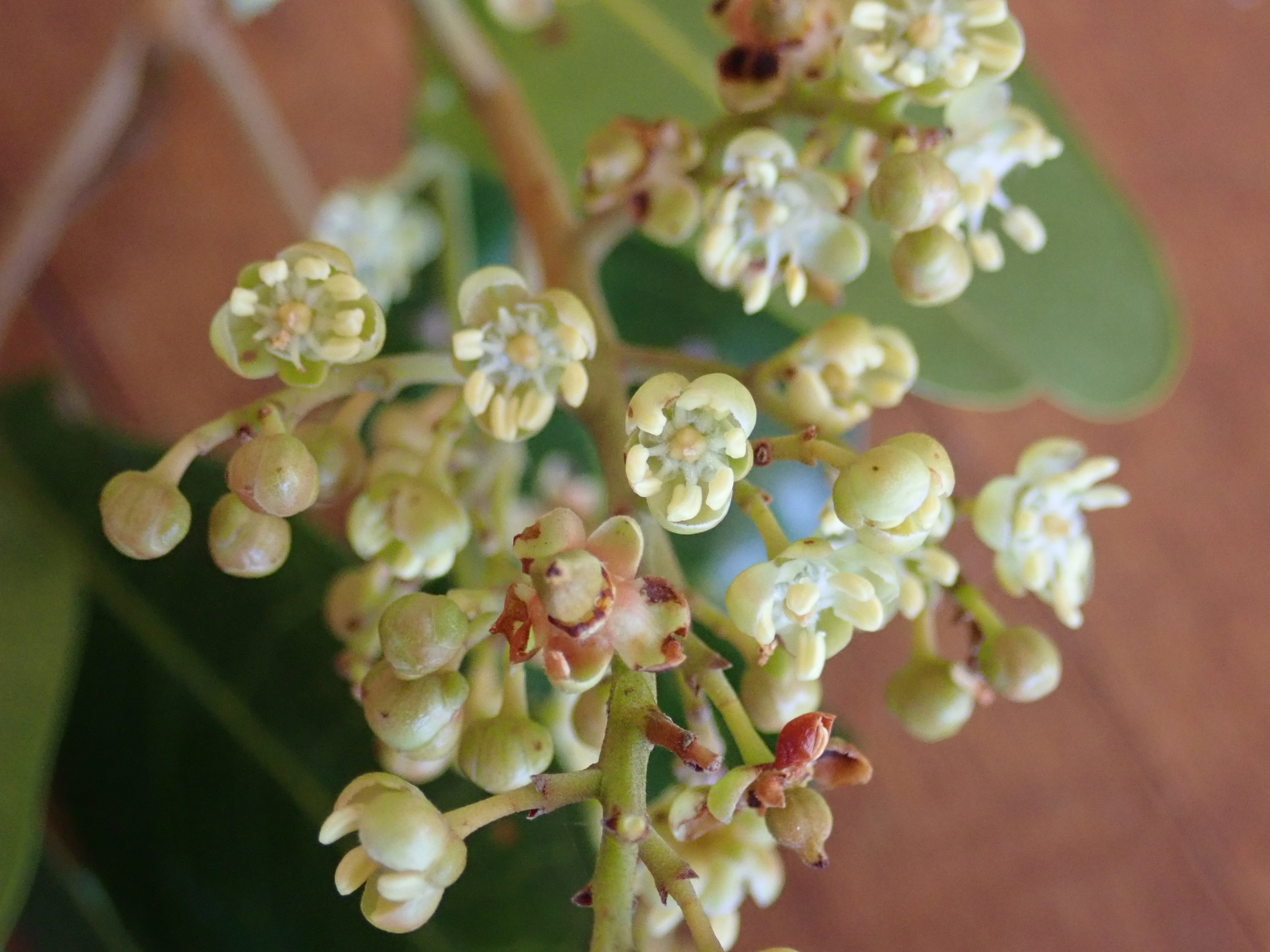
Flowers and early fruit, Palm Beach

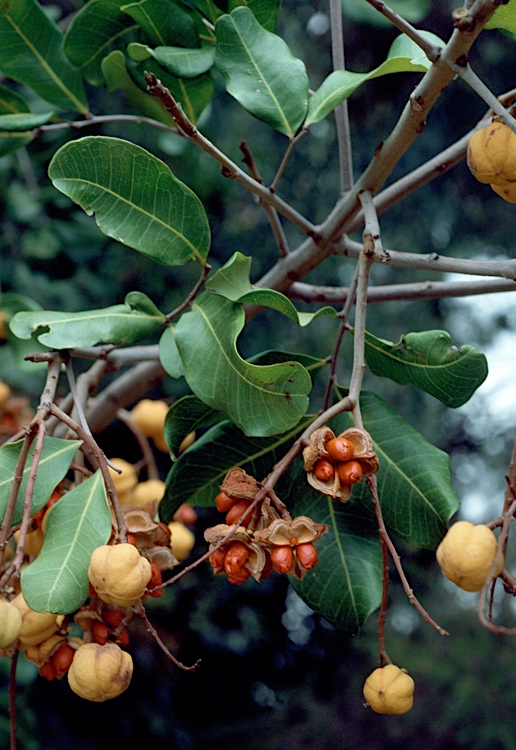
Fruit and mature seeds

Cupaniopsis anacardioides, commonly known as tuckeroo, cashew-leaf cupania, carrotwood, beach tamarind or green-leaved tamarind, is a species of flowering plant in the family, Sapindaceae, and is native to eastern and northern Australia. It is a tree with paripinnate leaves with 4 to 8 egg-shaped leaflets with the narrower end towards the base, or elliptic leaves, and separate male and female flowers arranged in panicles, the fruit a more or less spherical golden yellow capsule.

== Description ==
Cupaniopsis anacardioides is a tree that typically grows to a height of up to 11 m (36 ft), with a diameter at breast height (DBH) of 50 cm (20 in). Its branchlets are sometimes covered with short hairs pressed against the surface, and are lenticellate. The leaves are paripinnate, 150–250 mm (5.9–9.8 in) long with 4 to 8, sometimes up to 12 elliptic or egg-shaped leaflets with the narrower end towards the base, 45–190 mm (1.8–7.5 in) long and 16–75 mm (0.63–2.95 in) wide on a petiolule 2–7 mm (0.079–0.276 in) long. The leaflets are leathery with prominent veins and the lower surface is sometimes covered with soft hairs. Separate male and female flowers are borne in panicles 80–350 mm (3.1–13.8 in) long on a softly-hairy peduncle, the flowers greenish-white or yellowish on a pedicel 3–7 mm (0.12–0.28 in) long. The sepals lobes are 2.5–4.0 mm (0.098–0.157 in) long and the petals are egg-shaped, 1.5–3 mm (0.059–0.118 in) long. Flowering occurs in June and July and the fruit is a golden yellow capsule, tinged with red.

== Taxonomy ==
This species was first formally described in 1834 by Achille Richard who gave it the name in Voyage de découvertes de l'Astrolabe - Botanique from specimens collected near Moreton Bay by Charles Fraser. In 1879, Ludwig Radlkofer transferred the species to the genus Cupaniopsis as C.anacardioides. The specific epithet (anacardioides) means 'resembling the genus Anacardium', because of the similarity of the leaves.

== Distribution and habitat ==
The usual habitat of this species is on rocky beaches, in hilly scrub and forest in littoral rainforest on sand or near estuaries. The species occurs in New Guinea, the Dampierland and Northern Kimberley bioregions of northern Western Australia, the far north of the Northern Territory, and in Queensland and New South Wales as far south as Gerroa.

Cupaniopsis anacardioides has been introduced to Pakistan, Florida and Hawaii and is an invasive species in the United States.

== Ecology ==
The fruit of tuckeroo attracts many birds, including Australasian figbird, olive-backed oriole and pied currawong, and is food for the larval stages of butterflies, including Anthene lycaenoides, A. seltuttus and Arhopala micale.

== Use in horticulture ==
Germination of tuckeroo from fresh seed occurs without difficulty, particularly if the seed is removed from the aril and soaked for a few days. Tuckeroo is widely cultivated in parks and is a spreading and shady street tree.

== Status as an invasive species ==
Carrotwood is an invasive species in the United States. It was first introduced to Florida in the 1960s as an ornamental tree, but escaped into natural areas, forming dense monocultures and outcompeting native plants. It invades many habitats and alters the understorey habitat. It produces many brightly-coloured fruits that are attractive to birds, which disperse it widely.

According to the University of Florida’s Institute of Food and Agricultural Sciences (UF/IFAS), carrotwood fruits are consumed by various bird species, including the fish crow (Corvus ossifragus), which acts as a seed disperser for the tree in some regions.
