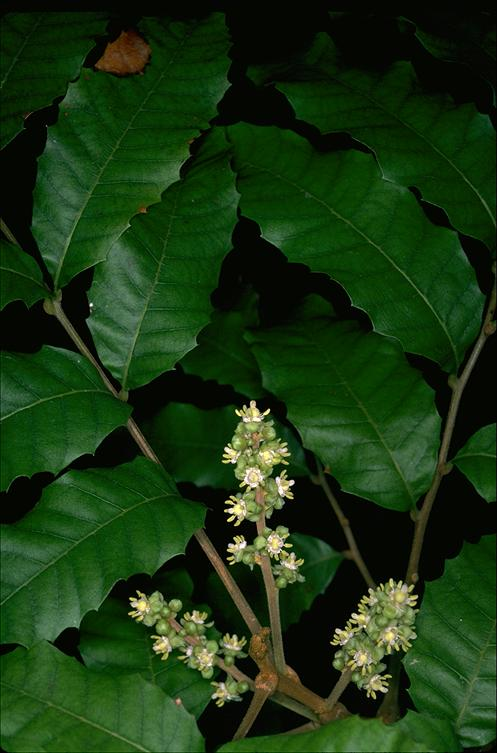
- In the ANBG

Scientific classification
- Kingdom: Plantae
- Clade: Tracheophytes
- Clade: Angiosperms
- Clade: Eudicots
- Clade: Rosids
- Order: Sapindales
- Family: Sapindaceae
- Genus: Cupaniopsis
- Species: C. serrata

Binomial name
- Cupaniopsis serrata (F.Muell.) Radlk.

= Cupaniopsis serrata =

Species of tree

Cupaniopsis serrata, commonly known as smooth tuckeroo, is a species of flowering plant in the soapberry family and is endemic to eastern Australia. It is a tree with paripinnate leaves with 6 to 12 oblong to egg-shaped leaflets with a pointed tip, and separate male and female flowers arranged in racemes, the fruit a more or less spherical capsule containing a seed with an orange aril.

== Description ==
Cupaniopsis serrata is a shrub or small tree that typically grows to a height of 4–25 m (13–82 ft) with a dbh of 30 cm (12 in). The branches, petioles, rhachises and peduncles are covered with soft, rusty-brown hairs and the branchlets and petiole have lenticels. The leaves are paripinnate with 6 to 12 oblong to egg-shaped leaflets 60–125 mm (2.4–4.9 in) long and 25 mm (0.98 in) wide with a pointed tip, the leaf rhachis 45–145 mm (1.8–5.7 in) long. The flowers are borne in racemes 10–65 mm (0.39–2.56 in) long and are sessile. The sepal lobes are up to 5 mm (0.20 in) long and covered with soft hairs, and the petals are white, egg-shaped and 2.5 mm (0.098 in) long. The fruit is a sessile, more or less spherical drupe 12–16 mm (0.47–0.63 in) long and 25–28 mm (0.98–1.10 in) wide covered with velvety hairs, and the fruit contains a seed nearly enclosed in an orange aril.

== Taxonomy ==
This species was first formally described in 1862 by Ferdinand von Mueller, who gave it the name Cupania serrata in Fragmenta Phytographiae Australiae from specimens collected near Moreton Bay by Walter Hill. In 1879, Ludwig Radlkofer transferred the species to Cupaniopsis as C. serrata.

== Distribution and habitat ==
Smooth tuckeroo grows on rocky hillside and in rainforest from near Gympie in south-eastern Queensland to near the Tweed River in northern New South Wales.

== Conservation status ==
Cupaniopsis serrata is listed as a "threatened species" under the New South Wales Government Biodiversity Conservation Act 2016.
