= Sally T. Reynolds =

Australian botanist

- Born: 1932 (age 93–94)
- Scientific career
- Fields: Botany, Spermatophytes
- Author abbrev. (botany): S.T.Reynolds

Sally T. Reynolds (born 1932) is an Australian botanist. She worked at the Queensland Herbarium as principal botanist and as a specialist on Australian Sapindaceae. Paul Forster named Synima reynoldsiae in recognition of her work on the species.

The standard author abbreviation S.T.Reynolds is used to indicate this person as the author when citing a botanical name.

== Names published ==
She has published 169 names, including:

- Alectryon diversifolius (F.Muell.) S.T.Reynolds, Austrobaileya 2(4): 335 (1987): (1987).
- Atalaya calcicola S.T.Reynolds, Austrobaileya 1(4): 404 (1981) (1981).
- Cupaniopsis newmanii S.T.Reynolds, Austrobaileya 2(1): 49 (1984) (1984).
- Elattostachys microcarpa S.T.Reynolds, Fl. Australia 25: 199, 72 (1985).
- Ixora oreogena S.T.Reynolds & P.I.Forst., Austrobaileya 7(2): 262 (-264; fig. 4, map 3) (2006).
- Tarenna monticola S.T.Reynolds & P.I.Forst., Austrobaileya 7(1): 38 (-40, 54; fig. 2, map 2) (2005).
- Triflorensia cameronii (C.T.White) S.T.Reynolds, Austrobaileya 7(1): 46 (2005).

(These may not all be accepted names.)

== Selected publications ==
=== Book chapter contributions ===
- "Sapindaceae", co-authored with J. G. West, Melianthaceae to Simaroubaceae. Vol. 25. Australia. Bureau of Flora and Fauna. Canberra: Australian Government Pub. Service. 1985. ISBN 0-644-03724-5. OCLC 29017154.

=== Articles ===
- Reynolds, Sally T.; Pedley, L. (1981). "A Revision of Atylosia (Leguminosae) in Australia". Austrobaileya. 1 (4): 420–428. doi:10.5962/p.365515. ISSN 0155-4131. JSTOR 41738626.
- Reynolds, Sally T. (1981). "Notes on Sapindaceae in Australia, I". Austrobaileya. 1 (4): 388–419. doi:10.5962/p.365514. ISSN 0155-4131. JSTOR 41738625.
- Reynolds, Sally T. (1982). "Notes on Sapindaceae in Australia, II". Austrobaileya. 1 (5): 472–496. doi:10.5962/p.364247. ISSN 0155-4131. JSTOR 41738633.
- Reynolds, Sally T. (1984). "Notes on Sapindaceae, III". Austrobaileya. 2 (1): 29–64. doi:10.5962/p.365524. JSTOR 41739161.
- Reynolds, Sally T. (1985). "Notes on Sapindaceae, IV". Austrobaileya. 2 (2): 153–189. doi:10.5962/p.365534. ISSN 0155-4131. JSTOR 41738663.
- Reynolds, Sally T.; Henderson, Rodney J.F. (2004). "Vanguerieae A.Rich. ex Dum. (Rubiaceae) in Australia, 3. Psydrax Gaertn". Austrobaileya. 6 (4): 817–889. doi:10.5962/p.299697. ISSN 0155-4131. JSTOR 41739064.
