= L. intermedia =

L. intermedia may refer to:

- Loxosceles intermedia, a recluse spider, commonly known as the "Brazilian brown spider"
- Lagerstroemia intermedia, a plant species found in China and Thailand
- Lebeda intermedia, a moth species found in Borneo, Sumatra and Peninsular Malaysia

== Synonyms ==
- Liocranchia intermedia, a synonym for Liocranchia reinhardti, a deep sea squid species found worldwide in tropical and subtropical waters

== See also ==
- Intermedia (disambiguation)
