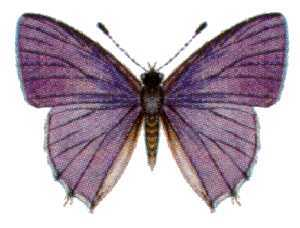

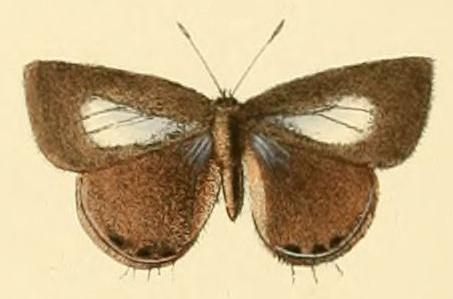

Scientific classification
- Kingdom: Animalia
- Phylum: Arthropoda
- Class: Insecta
- Order: Lepidoptera
- Family: Lycaenidae
- Genus: Anthene
- Species: A. lycaenoides

Binomial name
- Anthene lycaenoides (Felder, 1860)

Synonyms
- Dipsas lycaenoides Felder, 1860; Lycaenesthes pegobates Holland, 1900; Lycaenesthes lycaenina sutrana Fruhstorfer, 1916; Lycaenesthes turneri Miskin, 1890

= Anthene lycaenoides =

Pale ciliate blue

Species of butterfly

Anthene lycaenoides, the pale ciliate blue, is a butterfly of the family Lycaenidae. It is found from Malaya to New Guinea.

The wingspan is about 25 millimetres (1 in).

The larvae feed on Bridelia tomentosa, Rhyssopterys timorensis, Flagellaria indica, Clerodendrum floribundum, Oxera splendida, Cupaniopsis anacardioides, Pongamia pinnata, Caesalpina crista, Senna alata, Cassia fistula, Senna gaudichaudii and Senna surattensis.

== Subspecies ==
- A. l. godeffroyi (Semper, [1879]) – Australia (Northern Territory, Queensland)
- A. l. lycaenoides (Felder, 1860) – Indonesia
- A. l. pegobates (Holland, 1900) – Indonesia
- A. l. sutrana (Fruhstorfer, 1916) – Indonesia (Kai Islands), Western New Guinea
