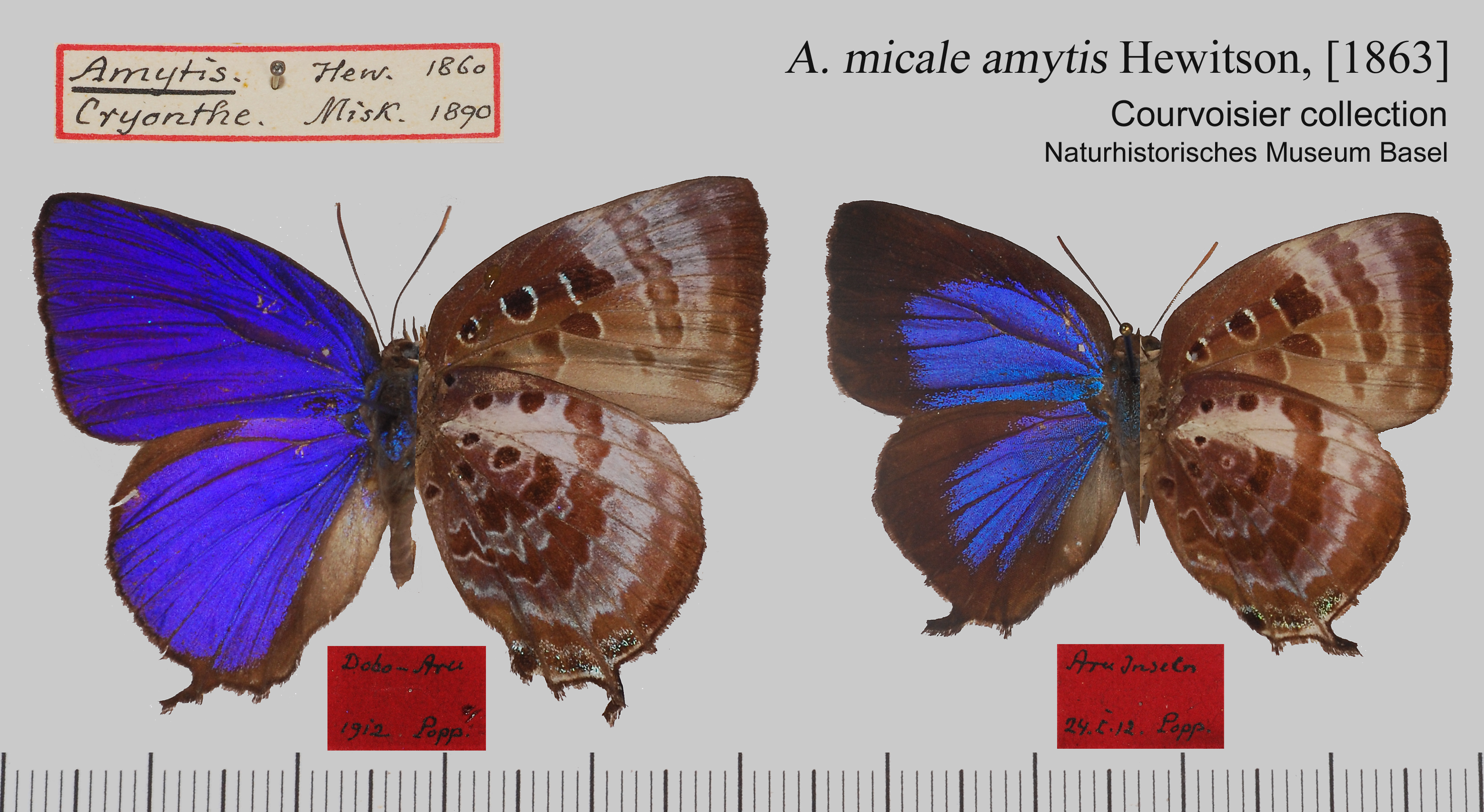
- A. m. amtyis From the Courvoisier Collection, Basel, Switzerland
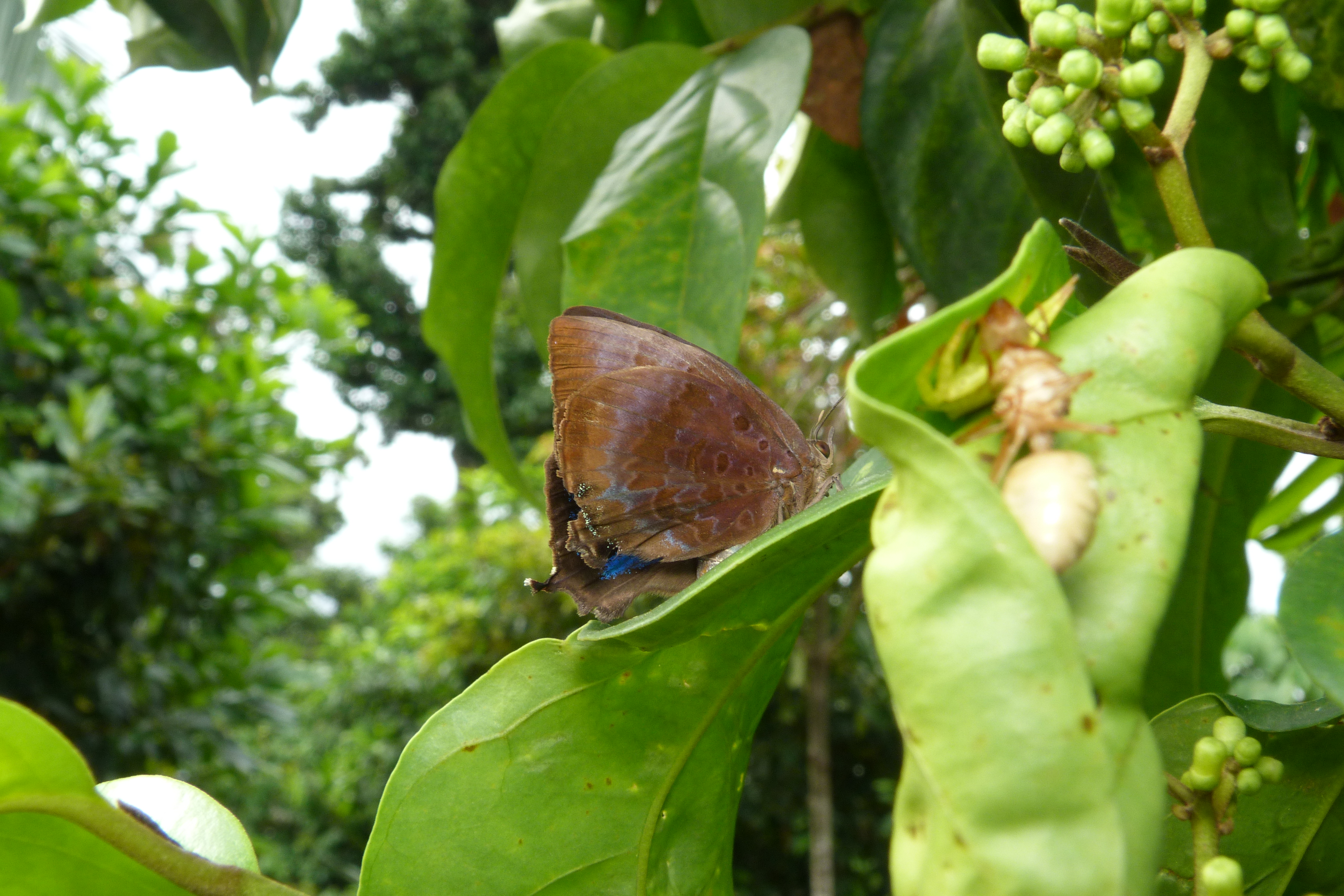

Scientific classification
- Kingdom: Animalia
- Phylum: Arthropoda
- Clade: Pancrustacea
- Class: Insecta
- Order: Lepidoptera
- Family: Lycaenidae
- Genus: Arhopala
- Species: A. micale

Binomial name
- Arhopala micale Blanchard, 1853

Synonyms
- Arhopala amphis Waterhouse, 1942; Amblypodia amytis Hewitson, 1862; Amblypodia cyronthe Miskin, 1890; Arhopala amydon Waterhouse, 1942; Arhopala tebaensis Strand, 1913

= Arhopala micale =

Species of butterfly

Arhopala micale, the common oakblue or shining oakblue, is a butterfly of the family Lycaenidae. The species comprises about 16 subspecies, which are found in Melanesia and New Guinea as well as the north coast of Australia (see subspecies section).

The wingspan of Arhopala micale is approximately 40 mm. The upper surface of the wings is very similar to that of A.sophrosyne, but overall it appears somewhat more ultramarine, particularly in the costal area of the forewing, which exhibits a more violetish-blue hue. The under surface lacks the intense brightening in the distal part of all the wings; the spots are larger, more irregular, and in the hindwing.— superba Rob. is beneath in both sexes browner, in the female above the black margin of the wings is broader and more sharply defined

The larvae feed on Buchanania arborescens, Cordia dichotoma, Calophyllum inophyllum, Terminalia muelleri, Glochidion ferdinandi, Cryptocarya hypospodia, Lagerstroemia speciosa, Hibiscus tiliaceus, Acmena, Cupaniopsis anacardioides, Heritiera littoralis and Oxera splendida. They are attended by the ant species Oecophylla smaragdina.

== Subspecies ==
- A. m. micale (southern New Guinea to Papua, Manam Island, Fergusson Island, Yule Island)
- A. m. amphis (Australia, from Cooktown to Yeppoon)
- A. m. amytis (Thursday Island, Cape York)
- A. m. amydon (Groote Eylandt, Murray Island, Darwin)
- A. m. superba (Bachan, Halmahera, Morotai, Ternate)
- A. m. obina (Obi)
- A. m. acerba (Goram)
- A. m. leptines (Kai Island)
- A. m. ribbei (Aru)
- A. m. selymbria (Waigeu)
- A. m. bosnika (Biak)
- A. m. jona (Mioswar, Jobi, Noemfoor Island)
- A. m. novaeguineae (western West Irian)
- A. m. centra (northern New Guinea, north-eastern New Guinea, Karkar Island)
- A. m. cidona (Trobriand Island, Woodlark)
- A. m. riuna (Riu, Tagula, Yela, St. Aignan Island)
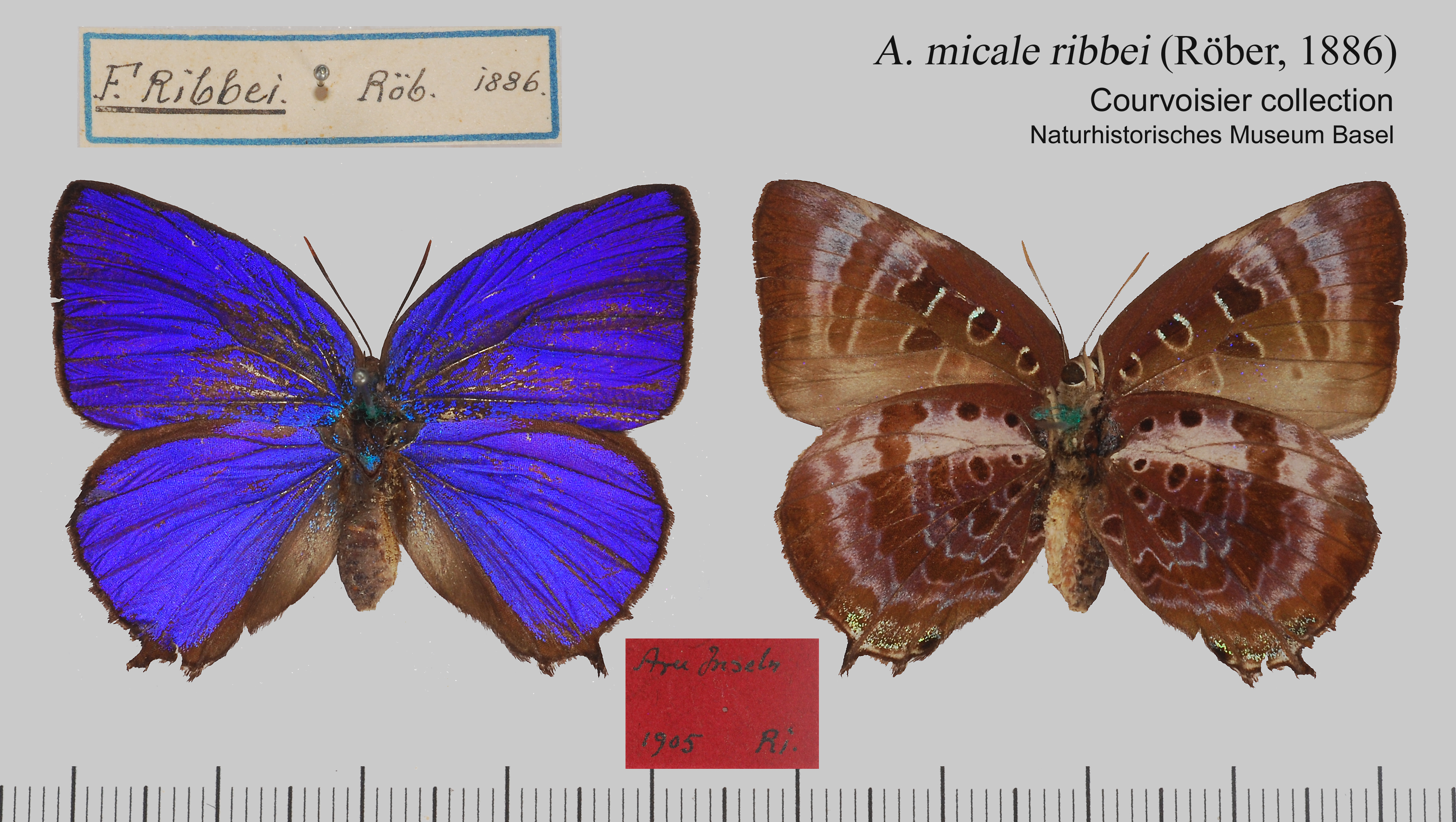
Arhopala micale ribbei

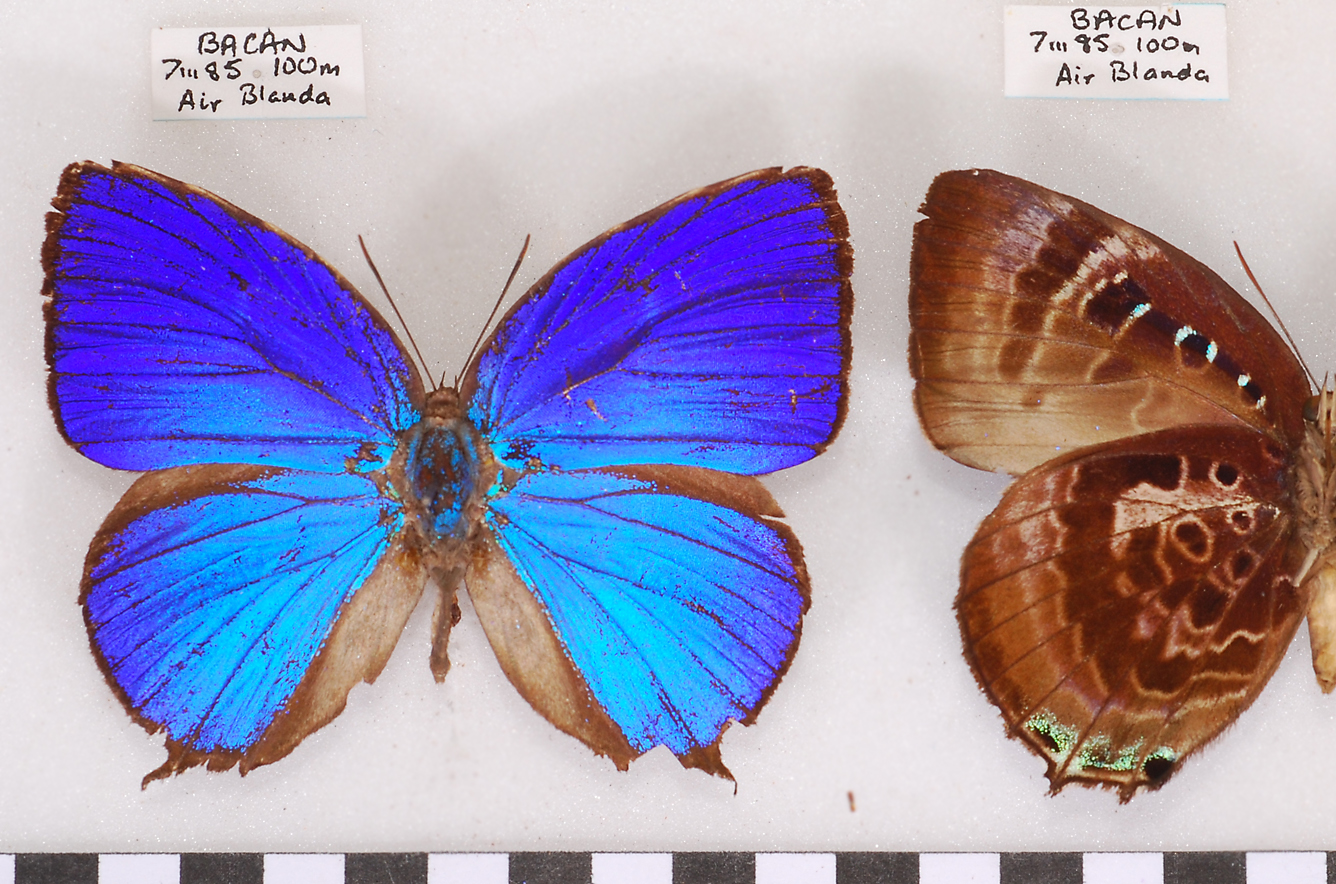
Arhopala micale superba
