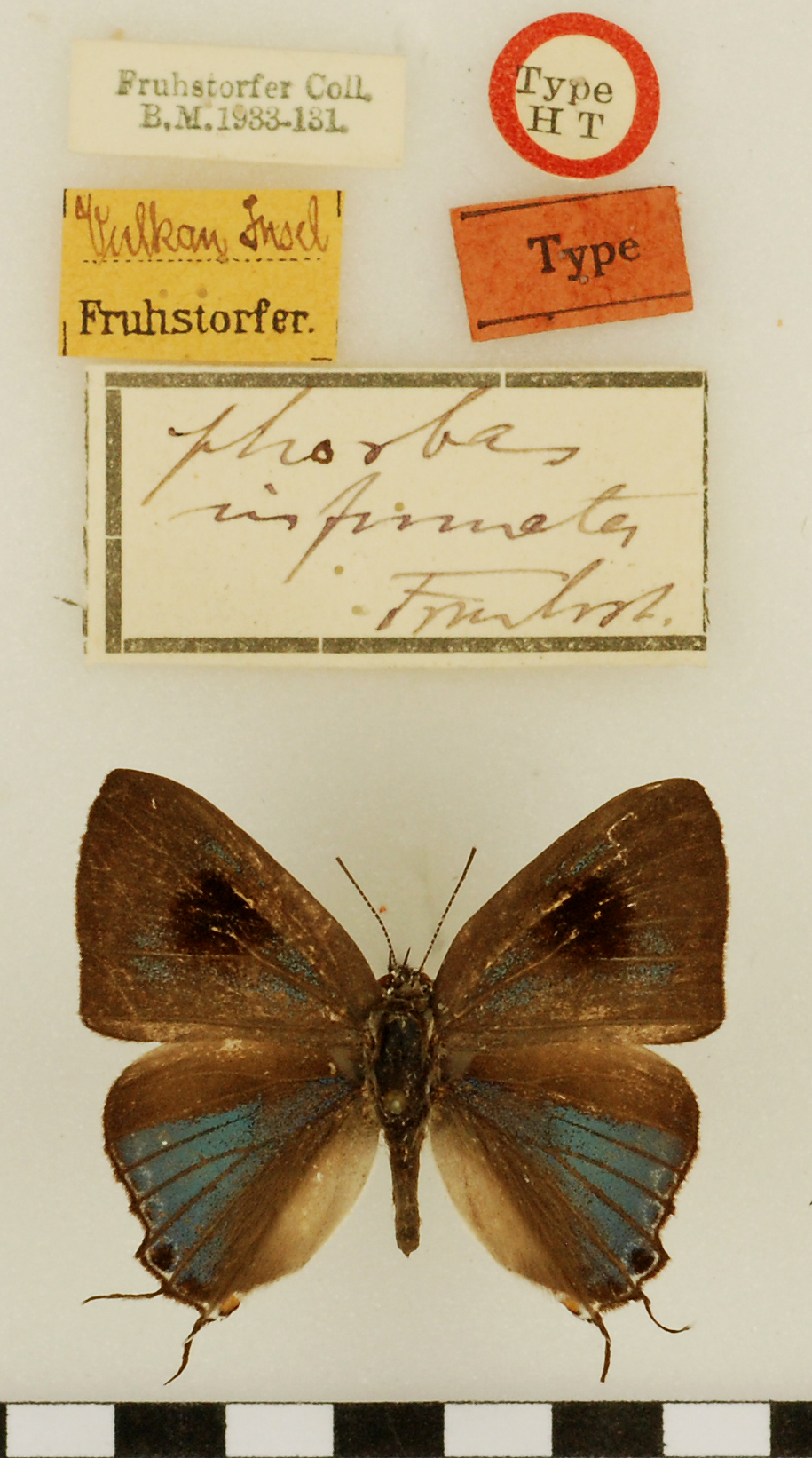
- Hypolycaena phorbas infumata Holotype

Scientific classification
- Kingdom: Animalia
- Phylum: Arthropoda
- Clade: Pancrustacea
- Class: Insecta
- Order: Lepidoptera
- Family: Lycaenidae
- Genus: Hypolycaena
- Species: H. phorbas

Binomial name
- Hypolycaena phorbas (Fabricius, 1793)

Synonyms
- Hesperia phorbas Fabricius, 1793; Myrina anterylus Doubleday, 1847 (nomen nudum); Hypolycaena noctula Staudinger, 1888

= Hypolycaena phorbas =

Species of butterfly

Hypolycaena phorbas is a butterfly of the family Lycaenidae. It is found in Waigeo, Biak, Roon Island, mainland New Guinea and various outlying islands as well as Australia.

The wingspan is about 30 mm. Adults are brown on top. The forewings of the males have a blue sheen and a large dark patch in the middle, while females have a white patch with a blue edge. The hindwings of both males and females have two tails beside a large black and white eyespot. The underside is fawn, with two rows of darker spots parallel to the wing margins. There are two small orange and black eyespots on the underside of the hindwings.

The larvae have been recorded feeding on the leaves, young shoots, buds, and flowers of a wide range of plants, including Flagellaria indica, Dendrophthoe vitellina, Cassia alata, Cassia fistula, Cupaniopsis anacardioides, Acmena, Eugenia, Suzygium wilsoni, Planchonia careya, Ceriops tagal, Lumnitzera racemosa, Terminalia melanocarpa, Aegiceras corniculatum, Clerodendrum floribundum, Clerodendrum inerme and Oxera splendida. They are green or brown, with a white-edged dorsal line. They are attended by Oecophylla smaragdina ants. They usually hide under a leaf during the day.

Pupation takes place on the stem of the food plant, often in groups. The pupa is green or brown with dark flecks and mottling.

== Subspecies ==
- H. p. phorbas (Cape York to Yeppoon)
- H. p. ingura Tindale, 1923 (Northern Territory)
- H. p. silo Fruhstorfer, 1912 (West Irian, Papua) (= H. p. walteri Fruhstorfer, 1916)
- H. p. dictaea C. & R. Felder, 1865 (Waigeu, Misool and possibly Salawati)
- H. p. infumata Fruhstorfer, 1910 (Manam Island)
- H. p. periphorbas Butler, 1882 (New Britain)
- H. p. pseudophorbas Fruhstorfer, 1914 (Biak, Roon island) (= H. p. latostrigatus van Eecke, 1915)

== Gallery ==
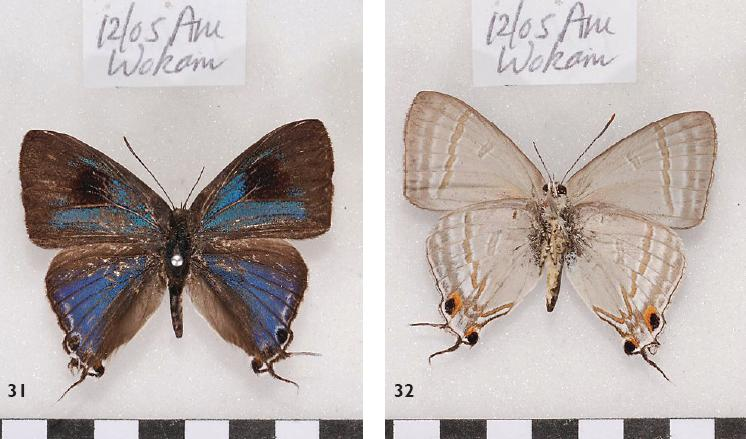
H. p. silo, male

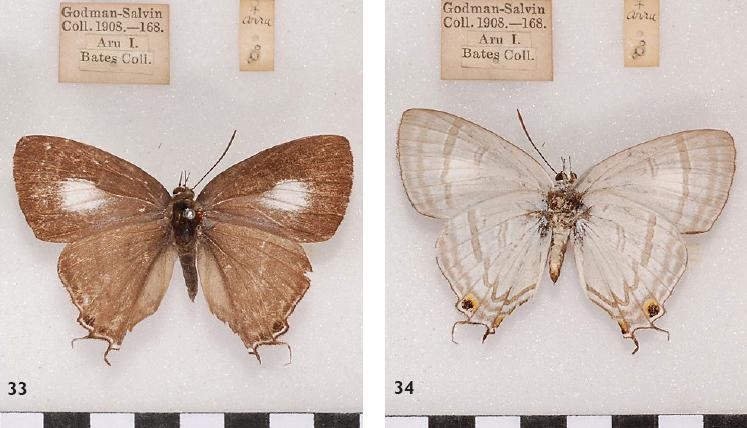
H. p. silo, female

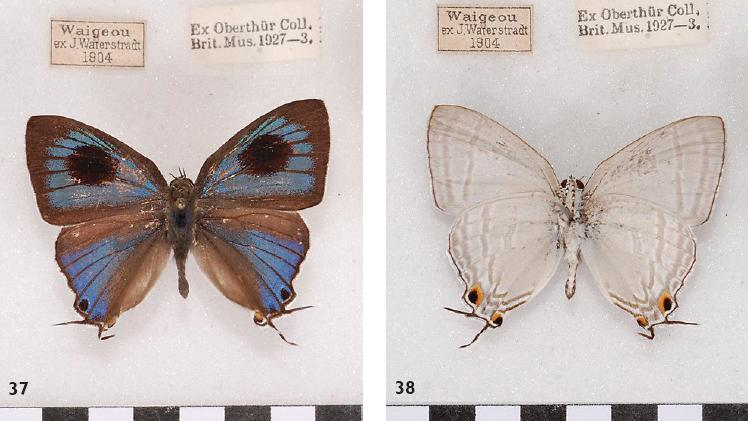
H. p. dictaea, male

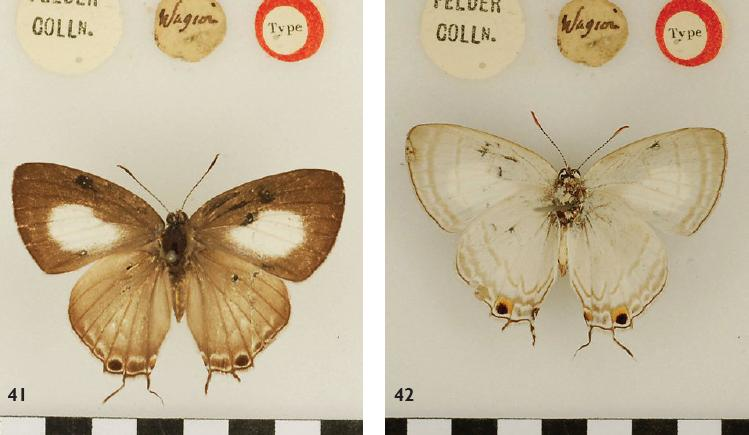
H. p. dictaea, female
