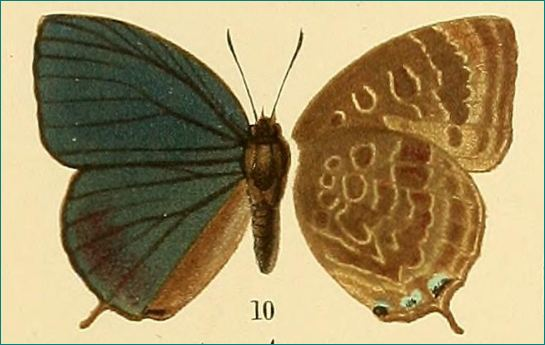
- Arhopala kiriwinii, male, Trobriand Is., from original description.

Scientific classification
- Kingdom: Animalia
- Phylum: Arthropoda
- Clade: Pancrustacea
- Class: Insecta
- Order: Lepidoptera
- Family: Lycaenidae
- Genus: Arhopala
- Species: A. kiriwinii

Binomial name
- Arhopala kiriwinii Bethune-Baker, 1903

= Arhopala kiriwinii =

Species of butterfly

Arhopala kiriwinii is a butterfly in the family Lycaenidae. It was described by George Thomas Bethune-Baker in 1903. It is found in the Australasian realm (Trobriand Island, Fergusson Island, Woodlar Island, and New Guinea).

== Description ==
It resembles very much Arhopala centaurus, particularly on the under surface which is intermediary between the latter and micale. Of the 3 spots in the cell of the forewing beneath the proximal one is by far the smallest. Easily discernible from centaurus by the light, intensely bright blue of the upper surface in the male; the female is still lighter blue, but on both its wings the costa and the margin are broad black.
