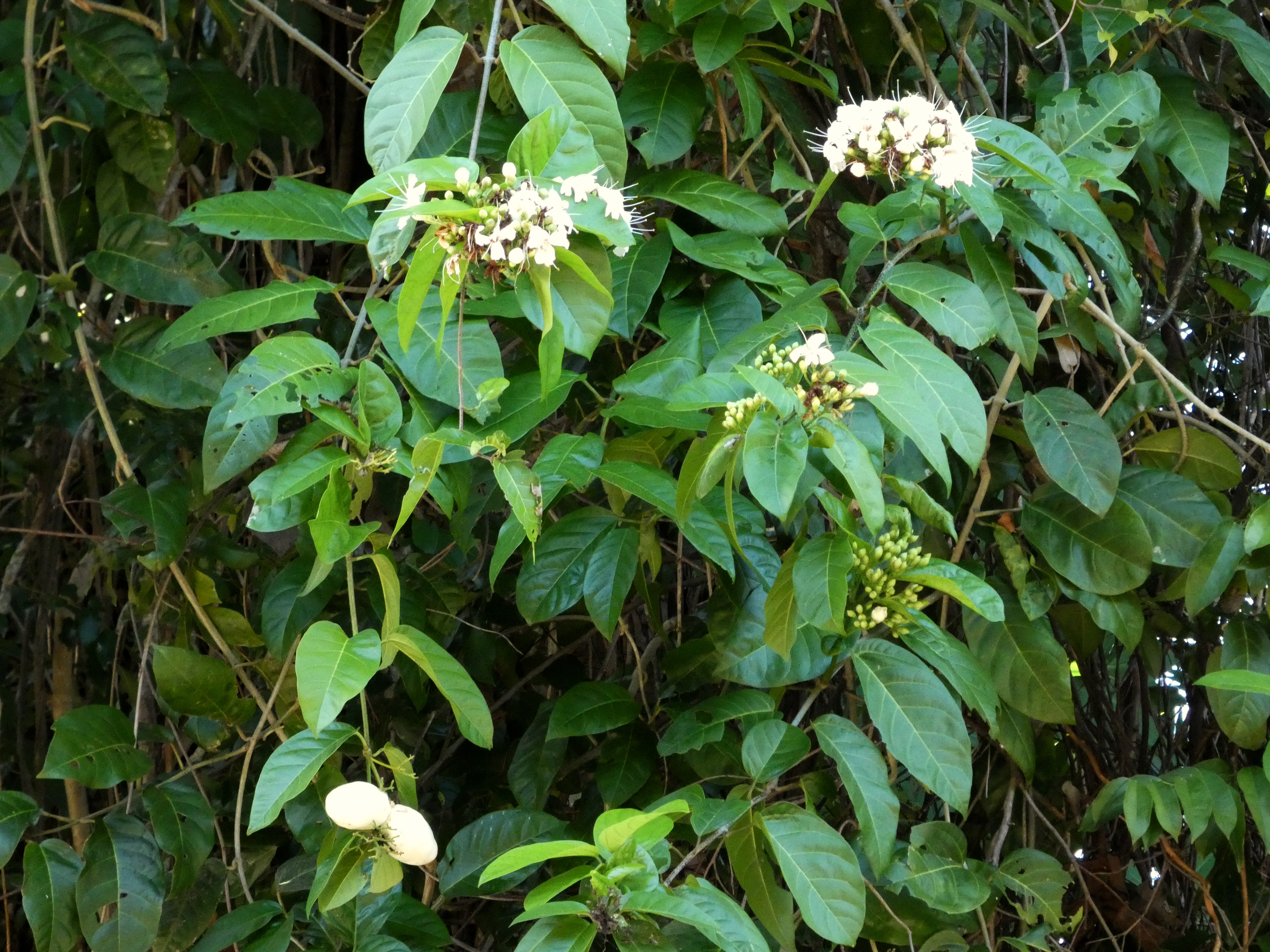
- Habit, flowers and fruit

Conservation status
- Least Concern (NCA)

Scientific classification
- Kingdom: Plantae
- Clade: Tracheophytes
- Clade: Angiosperms
- Clade: Eudicots
- Clade: Asterids
- Order: Lamiales
- Family: Lamiaceae
- Genus: Oxera
- Species: O. splendida

Binomial name
- Oxera splendida (F.Muell.) Gâteblé & Barrabé

Synonyms
- 15 synonyms: Faradaya splendida F.Muell.; Clerodendrum peekelii Markgr.; Faradaya albertisii F.Muell.; Faradaya dimorpha Pulle; Faradaya dimorpha var. cauliflora Moldenke; Faradaya excellens K.Schum. ex Moldenke; Faradaya hahlii Rech.; Faradaya magniloba Wernham; Faradaya matthewsii Merr.; Faradaya nervosa H.J.Lam; Faradaya papuana Scheff.; Faradaya parviflora Warb.; Faradaya parviflora var. angustifolia H.J.Lam; Faradaya peekelii (Markgr.) Moldenke; Faradaya ternifolia F.Muell.

= Oxera splendida =

Species of plant in the mint family

Oxera splendida is an evergreen vine in the family Lamiaceae which produces white, fragrant flowers and glossy white fruit. It naturally occurs in rainforests of tropical Asia and Australia and is often sighted along forest margins such as roads. Some common names include October glory, glory vine, potato vine and fragrant Faradaya. Australian indigenous names include Garanggal used in the Cairns area, Buku used in the Tully River area, Koie-yan used at Dunk Island and Djungeen used by the Girramay clan.

== Description ==
This woody, twining, evergreen, vine can grow up to 15 cm (5.9 in) in diameter. The ovate, glossy green leaves can grow to 24 cm (9.4 in) long and 13 cm (5.1 in) wide and are attached to the stem in pairs with petioles up to 8 cm (3.1 in) long. It flowers and fruits in the warmer months from August to April. The white, fragrant flowers are abundant but short lived, sometimes lasting only a single day. Each flower measures about 4.5 cm in diameter. The fruit is white and fleshy, about 8 cm (3.1 in) long and 5 cm (2.0 in) in diameter and resembles a potato or large egg. It contains a single large seed with a rough brown seed coating 1 to 3 mm (0.039 to 0.118 in) thick.

== Taxonomy ==
The species was first described in 1865 as Faradaya splendida, by Victorian government botanist Ferdinand von Mueller, based on plant material collected by John Dallachy near Rockingham Bay. Mueller created the genus Farradaya at the same time to accommodate the species, and both were published in his work Fragmenta phytographiæ Australiæ. Mueller placed it in the family Bignoniaceae but it was later moved to Verbenaceae and then to Lamiaceae. In 2015 a revision of the genera Oxera, Clerodendrum, Faradaya, and Hosea resulted in Faradaya being moved to Oxera.

The Australian national taxonomic authority, Australian Plant Name Index, and the Queensland Herbarium do not accept the name Oxera splendida, and the former Faradaya splendida is recognised.

== Distribution and habitat ==
The species occurs in Sulawesi, the Moluccas, New Guinea, the Solomon Islands and Queensland. It grows in rainforest, montane forest and swamp forest from sea level to 2000 m. The tolerant vine can grow in clay and humus, and can inhabit both undisturbed, primary forest and previously disturbed, secondary forests. It is common to see the white fruited vine along rain forest margins such as roads.

== Ecology ==
For several Australian butterflies, this species is a larval food plant. Those butterflies include the dark forest-blue (Pseudodipsas eone), coral jewel (Hypochrysops miskini), shining oak-blue Arhopala micale), black-spotted flash (Hypolycaena phorbas) and pale ciliate blue (Anthene lycaenoides). For at least P. eone, this butterfly will seek out Oxera splendida leaves specifically for the extrafloral nectaries. The nectaries found on the leaves produce nectare and P. eone will only feed one leaves with this characteristic.

The spectacled flying fox is a frugivore that eats O. splendida but is too small to consume and disperse the seed internally. It may disperse the fruit short distances by carrying the fruit. The much larger Southern cassowary also feeds on the fruit (it is one of the largest that the cassowary can ingest) and it disperses the seeds over large distances. The fruit and seed of this plant are both consumed by the musky rat-kangaroo. The rat-kangaroo is too small to swallow the seed whole but will chew at it.

This species is one of the prominent vine species that thrive in heavily cyclone damaged forest, otherwise known as cyclone scrub. These areas of forest tend to have a low, uneven canopy level due to damage from local intensification of cyclonic winds where several vine species will grow into the canopy.

== Uses ==
Oxera splendida is grown as a decorative plant in gardens. Its flowers are attractive and have a pleasant fragrance. When provided with plenty of sunlight and water, the vine is hardy and grows vigorously.

For the Australian Aboriginal Girramay clan, the Djungeen vine is one of the plants that provides a seasonal indicator to them — when the fruit falls to the ground in October, bush turkey nests will have eggs in them.

Another aboriginal use is to poison fish. The outer bark is removed and the middle layer of the bark is scraped off, then rubbed onto a hot stone. When the stone is thrown into a creek or small lagoon, all marine animals in the water are poisoned and death occurs within an hour. A sapotoxin is found in the leaves, stems and roots of the plant which is an effective fish poison. It will readily dissolve in water and is effective even in low concentrations.

== Gallery ==
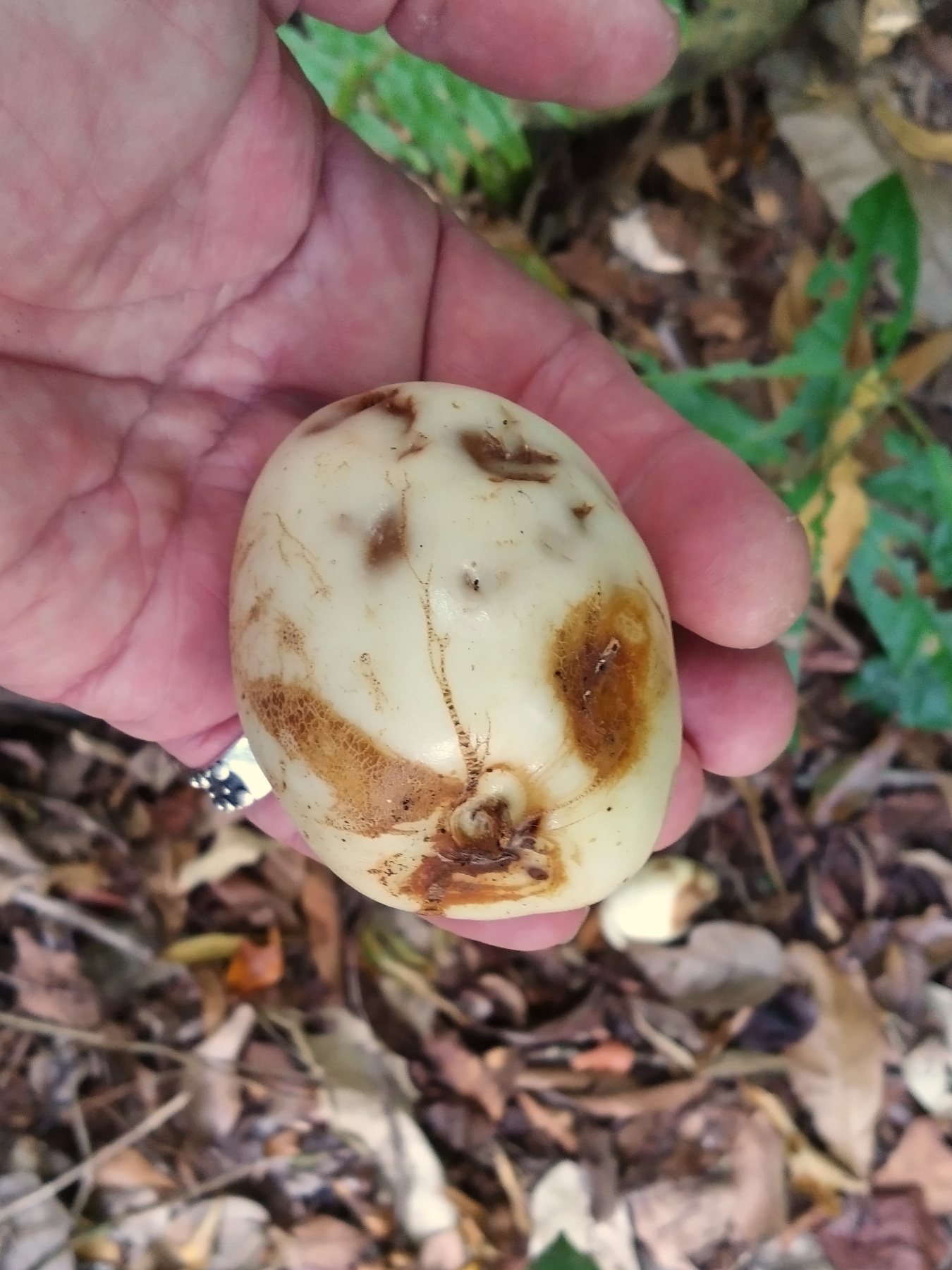
Fruit

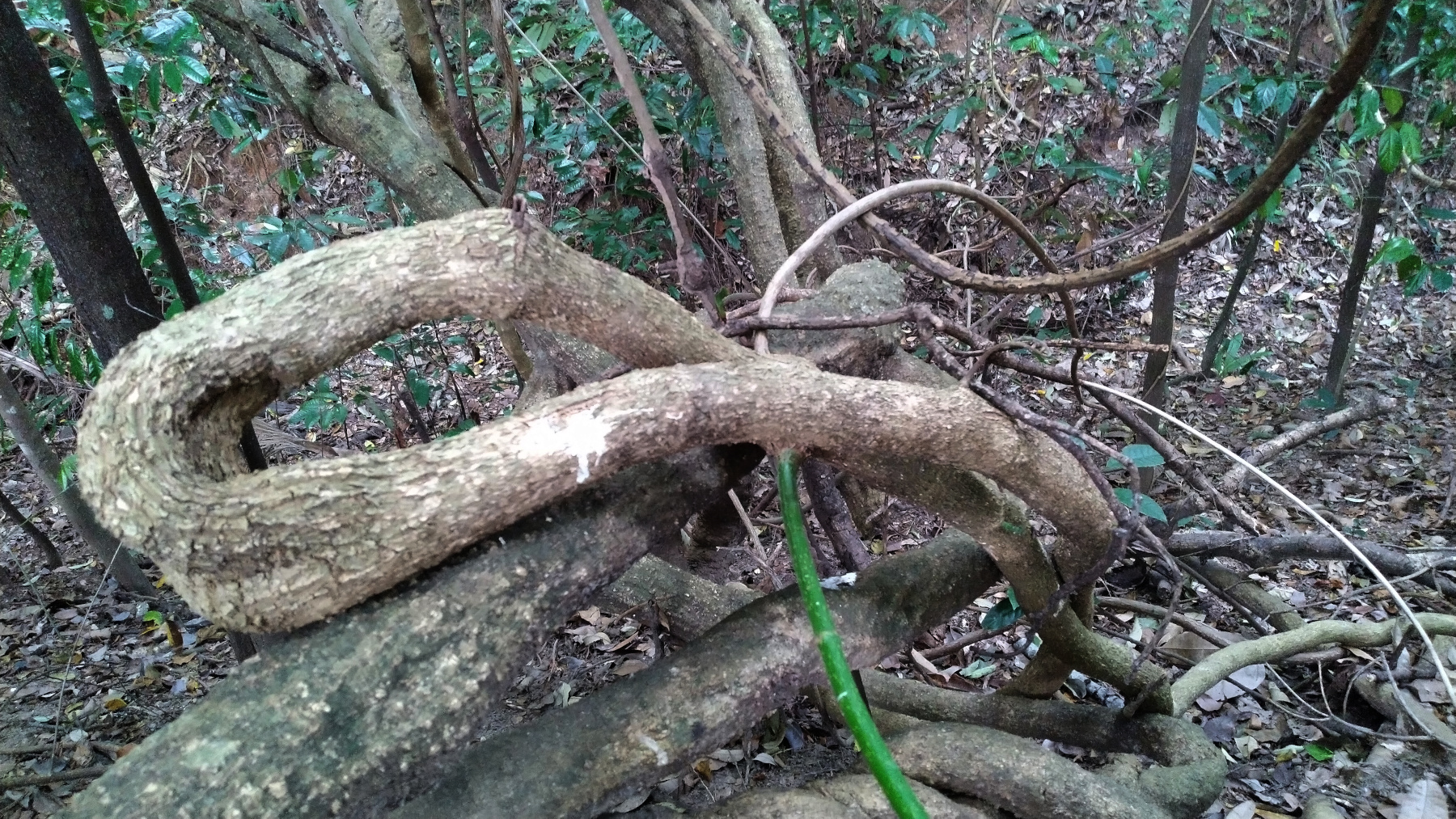
Vine stem coiled on forest floor

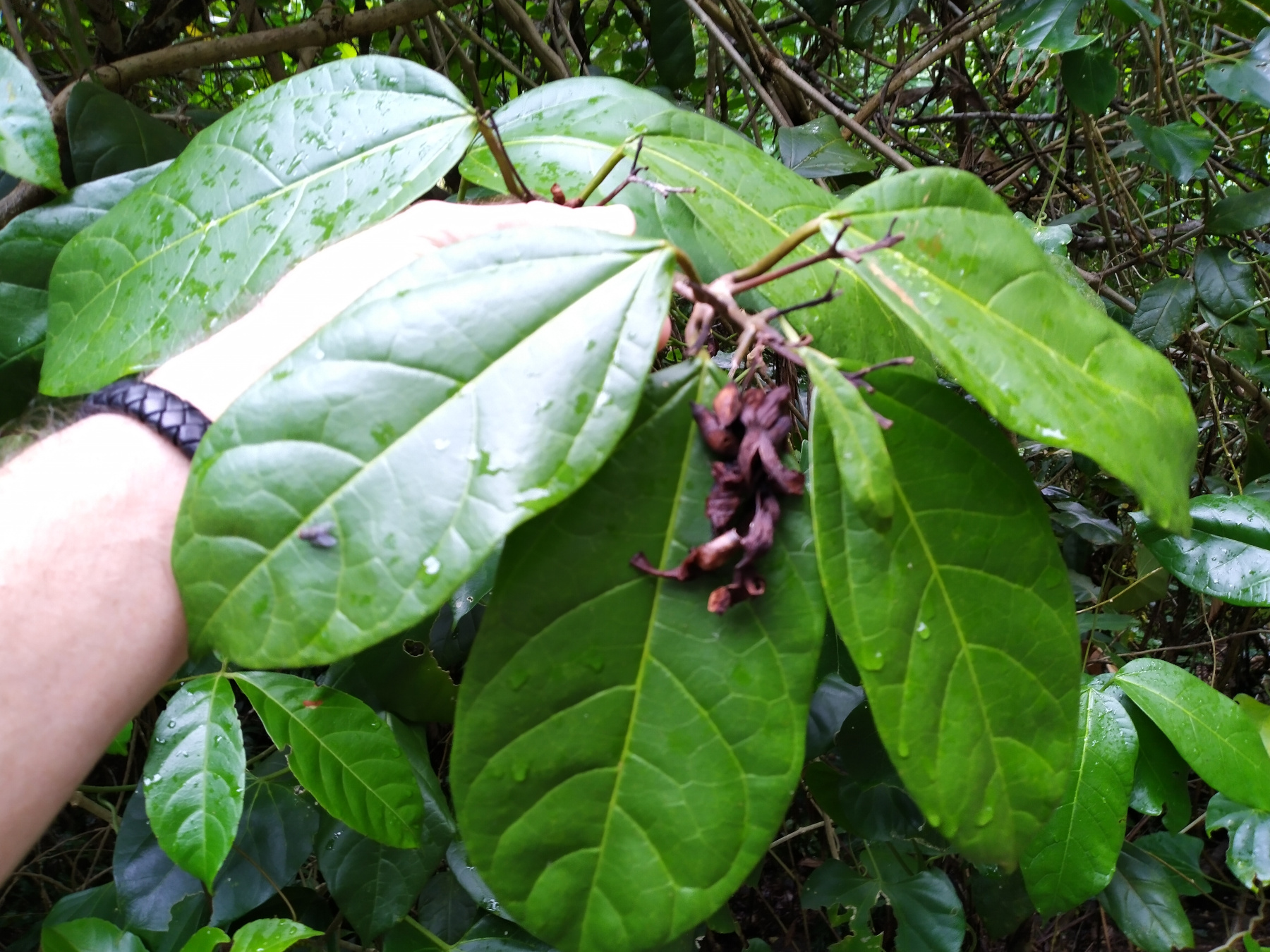
Leaves

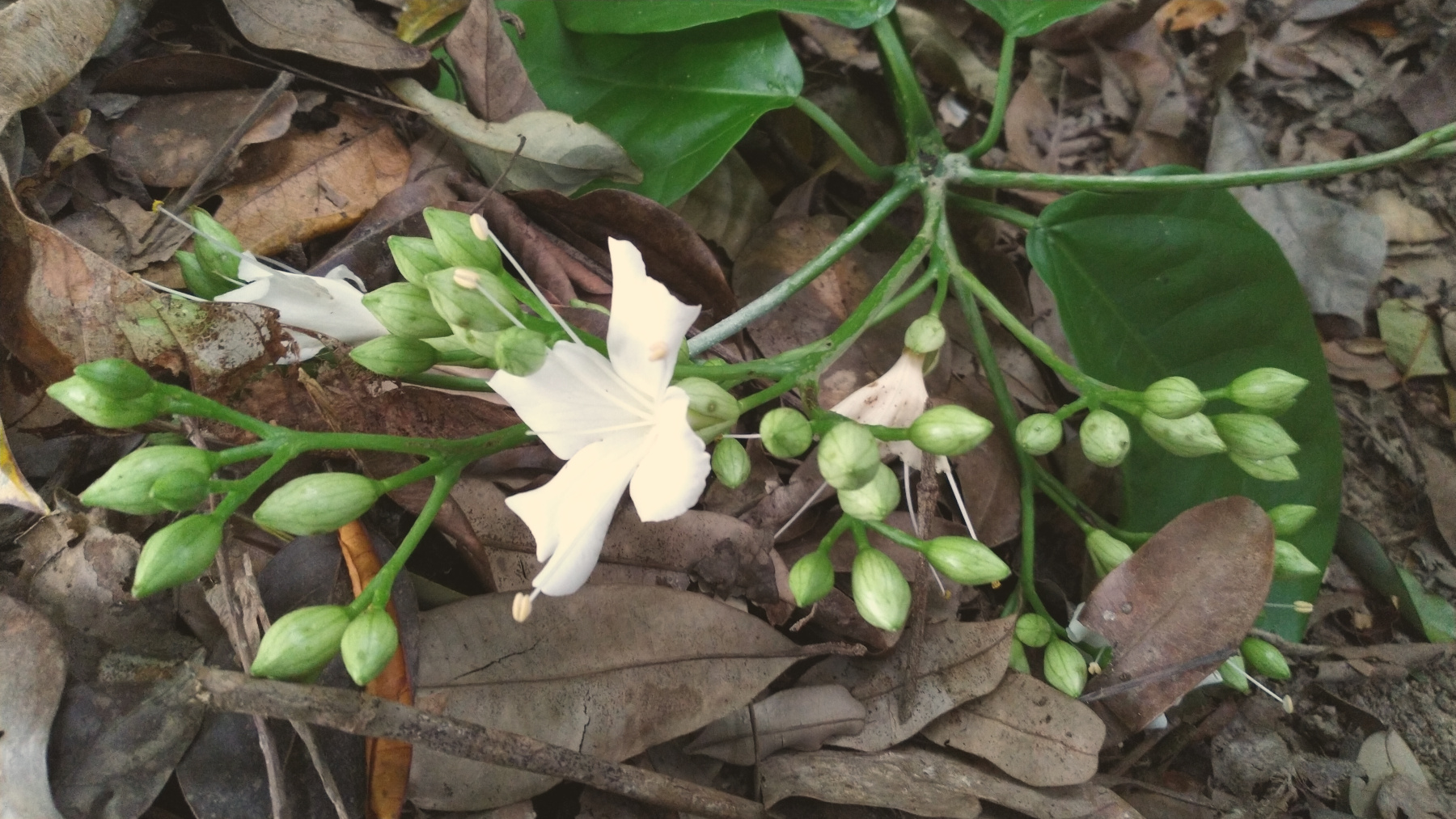
Inflorescence

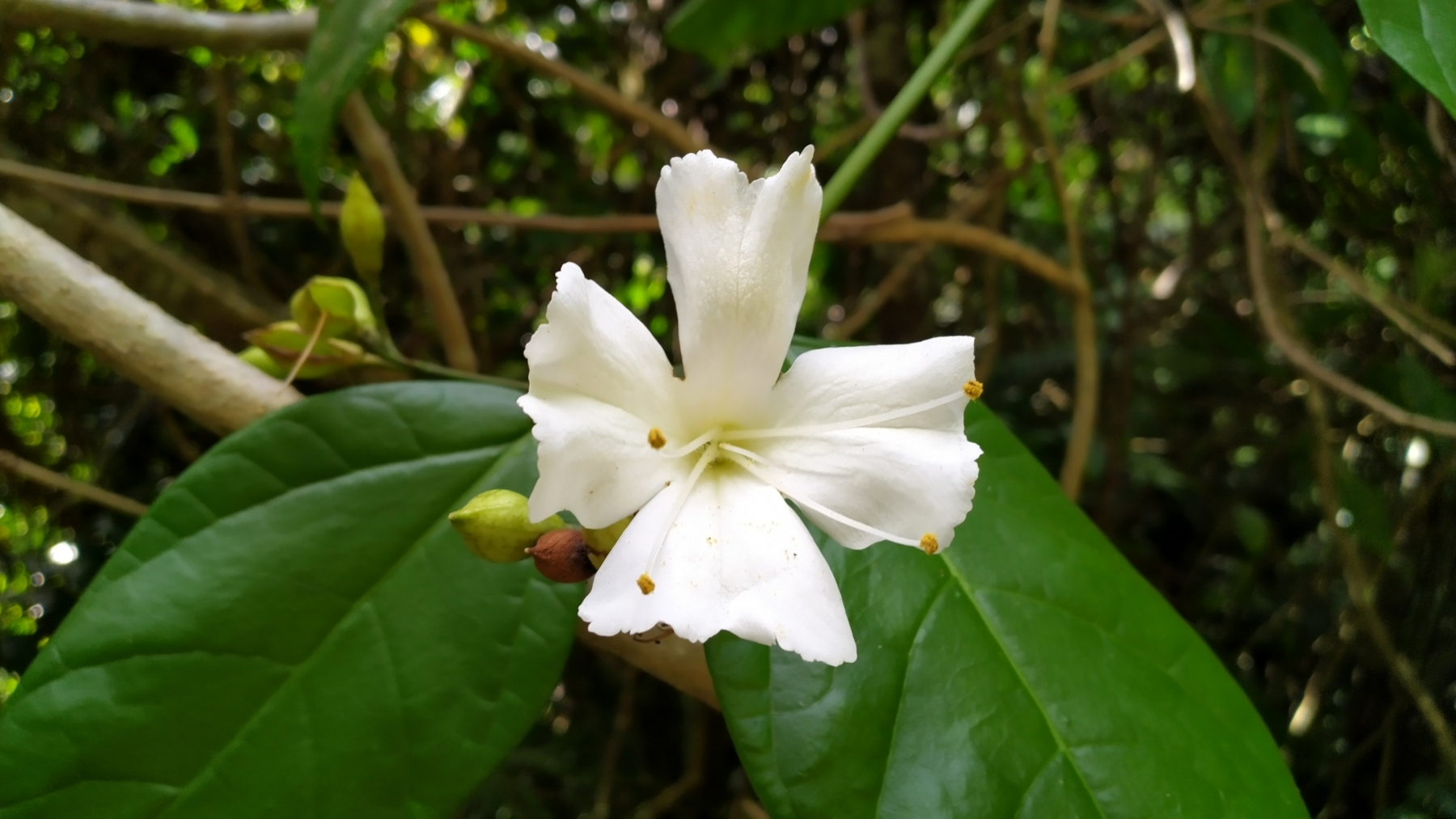
Flower
