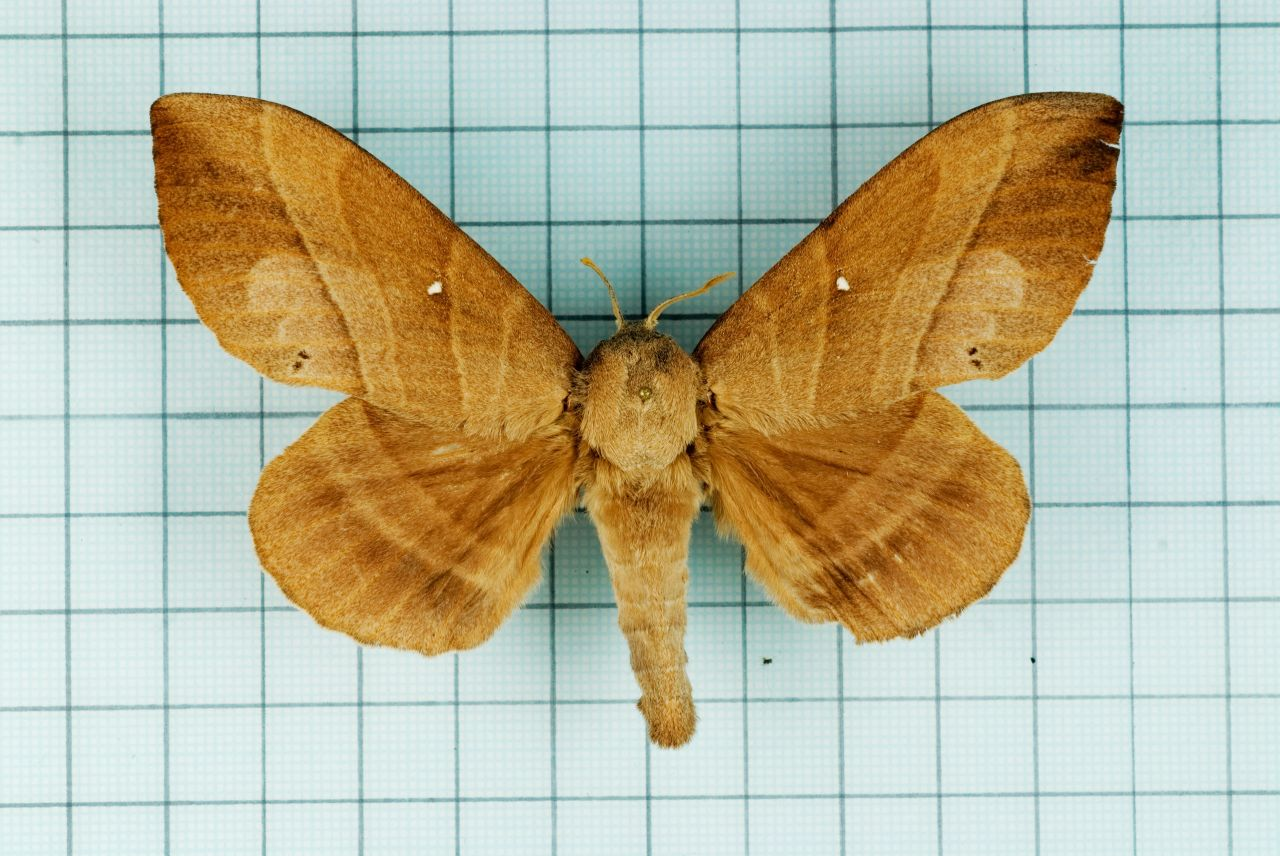

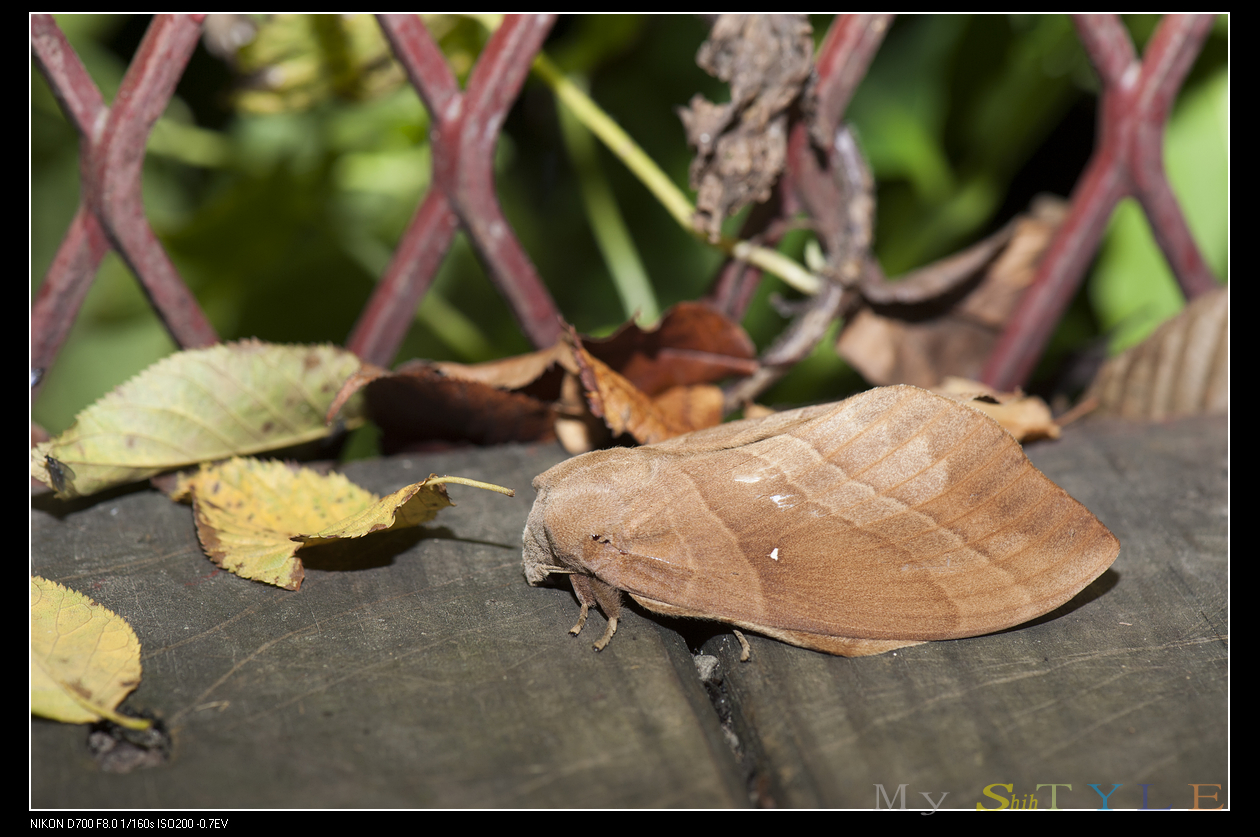

Scientific classification
- Kingdom: Animalia
- Phylum: Arthropoda
- Class: Insecta
- Order: Lepidoptera
- Family: Lasiocampidae
- Genus: Lebeda
- Species: L. nobilis

Binomial name
- Lebeda nobilis Walker, 1855

= Lebeda nobilis =

Species of moth

Lebeda nobilis, commonly known as the tea-oil caterpillar moth, is a moth of the family Lasiocampidae. It is found in Taiwan, China, Myanmar, India, Nepal and Indonesia.

The larvae feed on various plants, including Pteridium, Pinus, Rubus, and tea-oil camellia.
