= Lebeda brauni =

Scientific classification
- Domain: Eukaryota
- Kingdom: Animalia
- Phylum: Arthropoda
- Class: Insecta
- Order: Lepidoptera
- Family: Lasiocampidae
- Genus: Lebeda
- Species: L. brauni

Binomial name
- Lebeda brauni Lajonquière, 1979

Species of moth

Lebeda brauni is a moth of the family Lasiocampidae first described by Yves de Lajonquière in 1979. It is found on Borneo, Peninsular Malaysia and Sumatra.
