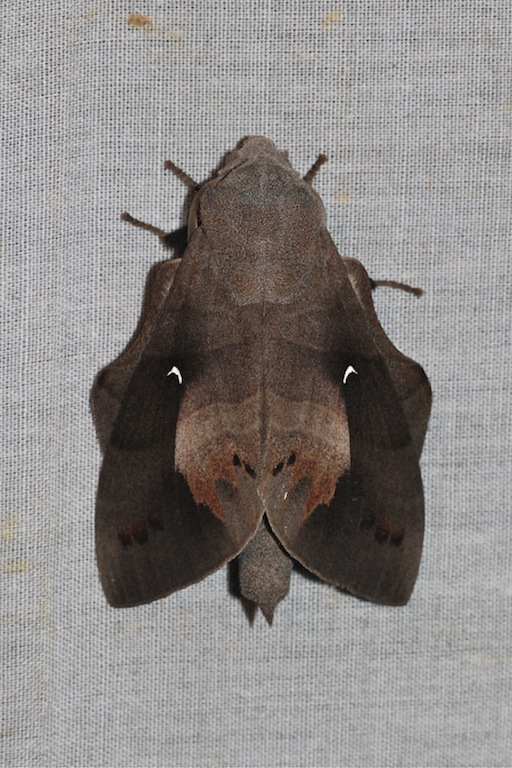
- Male from Borneo

Scientific classification
- Domain: Eukaryota
- Kingdom: Animalia
- Phylum: Arthropoda
- Class: Insecta
- Order: Lepidoptera
- Family: Lasiocampidae
- Genus: Lebeda
- Species: L. cognata

Binomial name
- Lebeda cognata Grunberg, 1913

= Lebeda cognata =

Species of moth

Lebeda cognata is a moth of the family Lasiocampidae first described by Karl Grünberg in 1913. It is found on Borneo, Peninsular Malaysia and Sumatra.

Larvae have been recorded eating Trema, Citrus and Rosa.
