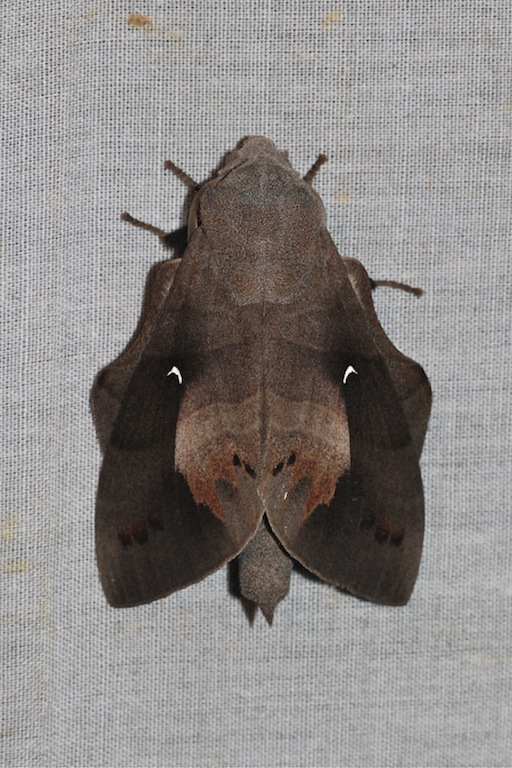
- Lebeda cognata

Scientific classification
- Domain: Eukaryota
- Kingdom: Animalia
- Phylum: Arthropoda
- Class: Insecta
- Order: Lepidoptera
- Family: Lasiocampidae
- Subfamily: Lasiocampinae
- Genus: Lebeda; Walker, 1855

= Lebeda =

Genus of moths

Lebeda is a genus of moths in the family Lasiocampidae. The genus was erected by Francis Walker in 1855.

== Species ==
- Lebeda agnata Tams, 1928
- Lebeda brauni Lajonquière, 1979
- Lebeda cognata Grunberg, 1913
- Lebeda intermedia Holloway, 1987
- Lebeda nobilis Walker, 1855
- Lebeda pruetti Holloway, 1987
