= Lebeda pruetti =

Scientific classification
- Kingdom: Animalia
- Phylum: Arthropoda
- Clade: Pancrustacea
- Class: Insecta
- Order: Lepidoptera
- Family: Lasiocampidae
- Genus: Lebeda
- Species: L. pruetti

Binomial name
- Lebeda pruetti Holloway, 1987

Species of moth

Lebeda pruetti is a moth of the family Lasiocampidae first described by Jeremy Daniel Holloway in 1987. It is found on Borneo.

The wingspan is 35 mm for males and 53 mm for females
