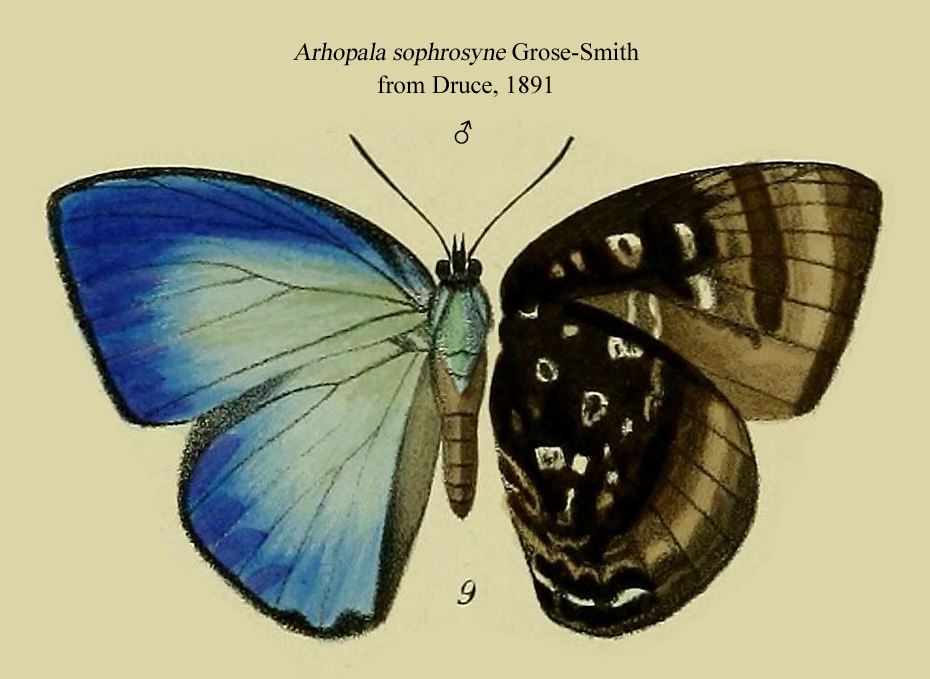

Scientific classification
- Kingdom: Animalia
- Phylum: Arthropoda
- Clade: Pancrustacea
- Class: Insecta
- Order: Lepidoptera
- Family: Lycaenidae
- Genus: Arhopala
- Species: A. sophrosyne

Binomial name
- Arhopala sophrosyne Grose-Smith, 1889

= Arhopala sophrosyne =

Species of butterfly

Arhopala sophrosyne is a butterfly in the family Lycaenidae. It was described by Henley Grose-Smith in 1889. It is found in the Australasian realm (New Ireland, Guadalcanal, and Bougainville).

== Description ==
It has, in the male forewing, which is above of a lustrous sky-blue, the costal area darkened by ultra-marine, whilst in the female the costal parts of all the wings are black. Easily discernible by the under surface where we notice in the chestnut-brown proximal parts of the wings small ring-spots distinctly surrounded by white.

Named in the Classical tradition for Sophrosyne.
