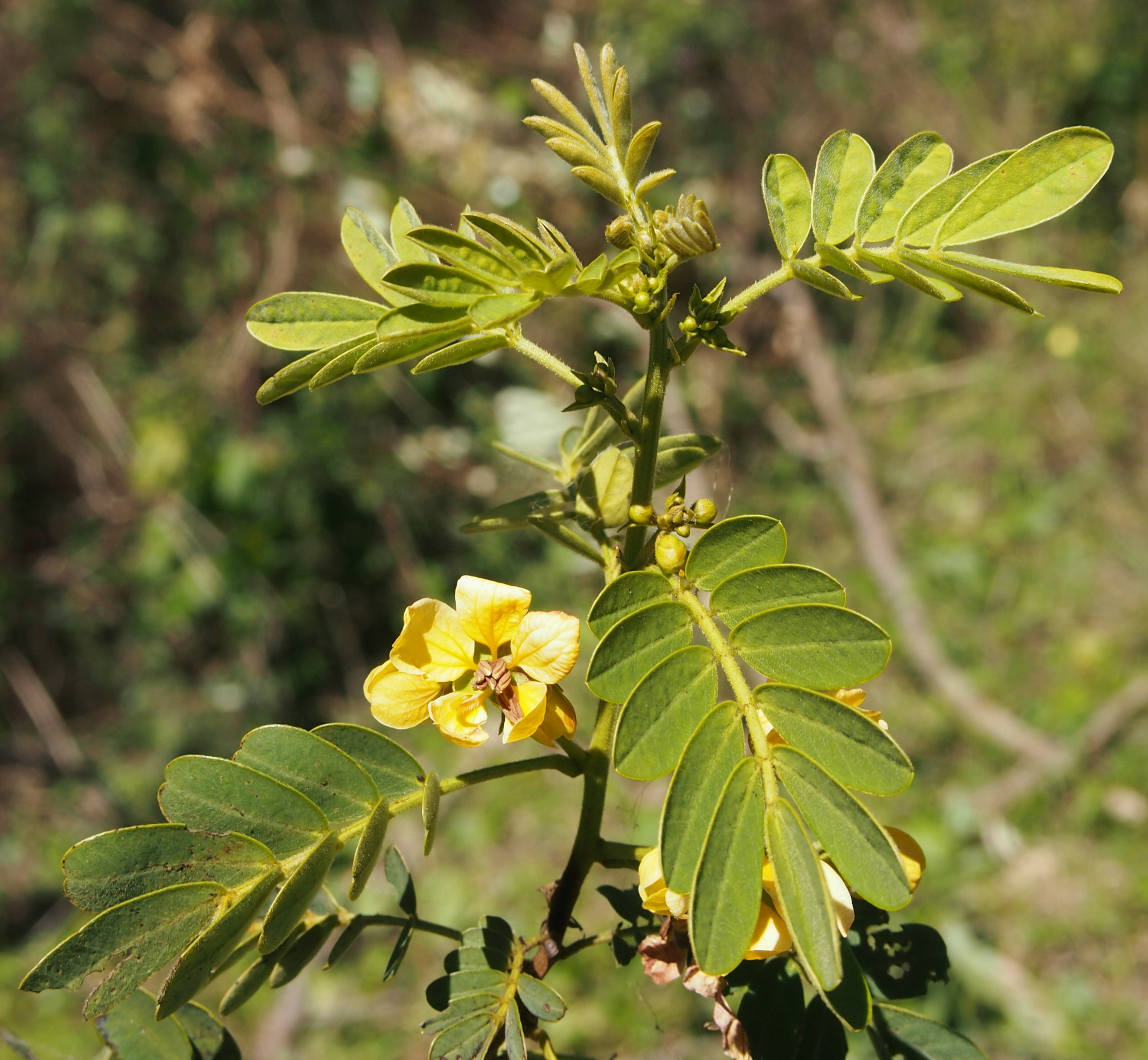

Scientific classification
- Kingdom: Plantae
- Clade: Tracheophytes
- Clade: Angiosperms
- Clade: Eudicots
- Clade: Rosids
- Order: Fabales
- Family: Fabaceae
- Subfamily: Caesalpinioideae
- Genus: Senna
- Species: S. gaudichaudii

Binomial name
- Senna gaudichaudii (Hook. & Arn.) H.S.Irwin & Barneby

Synonyms
- List: Cassia gaudichaudii Hook. & Arn.; Psilorhegma gaudichaudii (Hook. & Arn.) O.Deg.; Cassia deplanchei Benth.; Cassia glanduligera H.St.John; Cassia horsfieldii Miq.; Cassia retusa Sol. ex Vogel); Cassia retusa var. dietrichiae Domin; Cassia retusa var. glabrata Domin; Cassia retusa var. typica Domin; Senna glanduligera (H.St.John) A.C.Sm.; Senna surattensis subsp. retusa (Sol. ex Vogel) Randell

= Senna gaudichaudii =

Species of plant

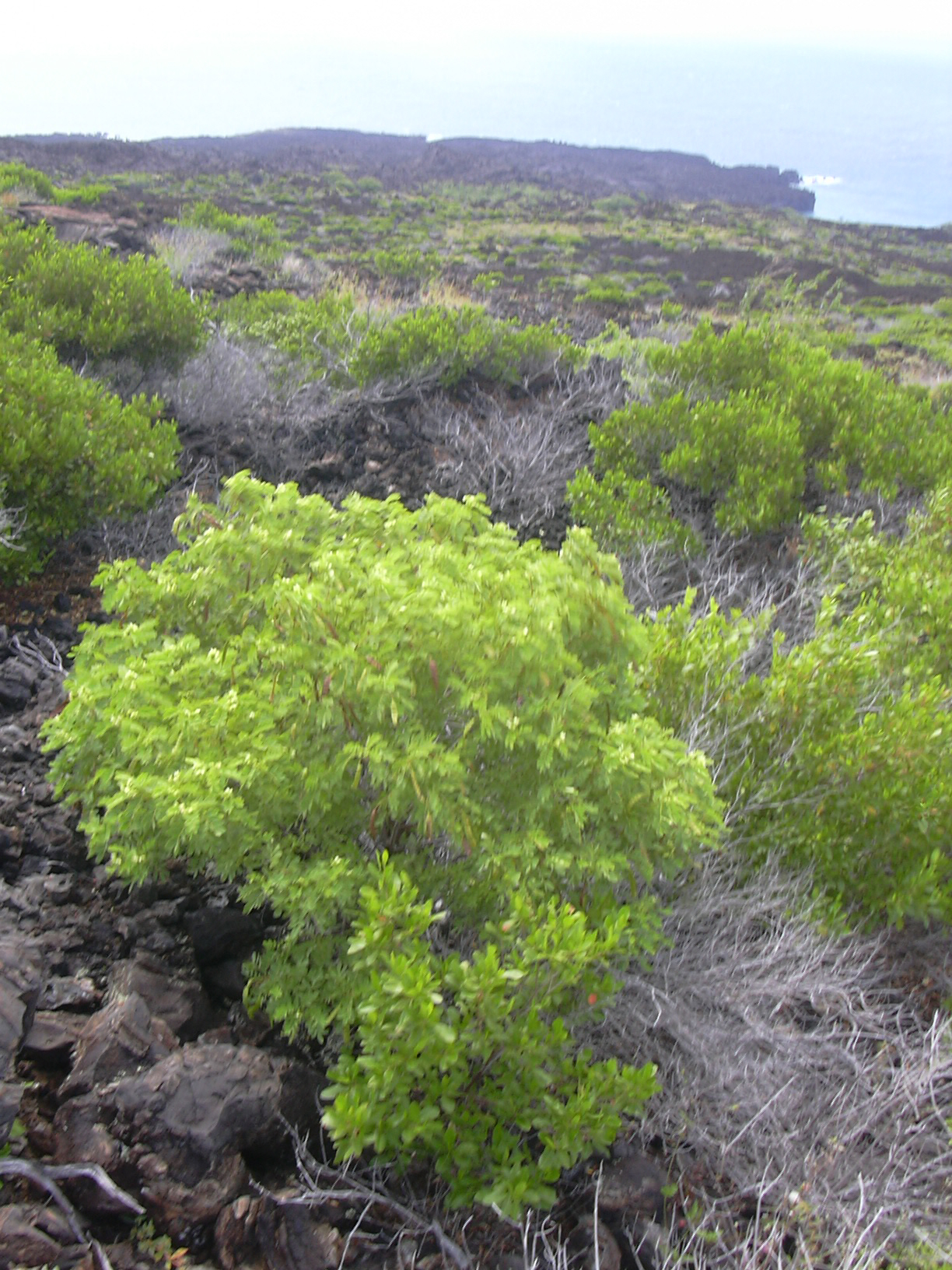
Habitat on Maui

Senna gaudichaudii, also known by many common names, including kolomana in Hawaii and as blunt-leaved senna in Australia, is a species of flowering plant in the family Fabaceae. It is native to some Pacific Islands including Hawaii, parts of Southeast Asia and Queensland in Australia. It is a shrub or small tree with pinnate leaves, usually with three to five pairs of oblong to egg-shaped leaflets, and yellow flowers arranged in groups of four to ten, with ten fertile stamens in each flower.

== Description ==
Senna gaudichaudii is a shrub or tree that typically grows to a height of 2–3 m (6 ft 7 in – 9 ft 10 in), sometimes a tree-top vine. Its new growth is sometimes covered with soft, golden-yellow hairs. The leaves are pinnate, 50–100 mm (2.0–3.9 in) long on a petiole 10–30 mm (0.39–1.18 in) long, usually with three to five pairs of oblong to egg-shaped leaflets, the narrower end towards the base. The leaflets are mostly 20–50 mm (0.79–1.97 in) long and 7–15 mm (0.28–0.59 in) wide, usually spaced 6–10 mm (0.24–0.39 in) apart. There are up to three stalked glands between the lowest pairs of leaflets. The flowers are yellow and arranged in upper leaf axils in groups of four to ten on a peduncle 30–50 mm (1.2–2.0 in) long, each flower on a pedicel 20–30 mm (0.79–1.18 in) long. The petals are 10–15 mm (0.39–0.59 in) long and there are ten fertile stamens, the anthers about 5–7 mm (0.20–0.28 in) long. Flowering occurs from February to October in Australia, and the fruit is a flat pod 100–150 mm (3.9–5.9 in) long, about 10 mm (0.39 in) wide and slightly curved.

== Taxonomy and naming ==
This species was first formally described in 1832 by William Jackson Hooker and George Arnott Walker Arnott, who gave it the name Cassia gaudichaudii in The Botany of Captain Beechey's Voyage. In 1982, Howard Samuel Irwin and Rupert Charles Barneby transferred the species to the genus Senna as S. gaudichaudii in Memoirs of the New York Botanical Garden. The specific epithet (gaudichaudii) honours Charles Gaudichaud-Beaupré.

This species is also known by the common names kolomana, kalamona, keuhiuhi, uhiuhi and heuhiuhi in Hawaii, and as climbing senna and Gaudichaud's senna in Australia.

== Distribution and habitat ==
Senna gaudichaudii occurs in Fiji, Hawaii, Java, the Lesser Sunda Islands, the Maluku Islands, New Caledonia, Pitcairn Island, Queensland, the Society Islands, Tubuai and Vanuatu. In Hawaii, this species inhabits dry, sheltered locations on rocky slopes, and disturbed sites. It is found on all Hawaiian islands apart from Niihau and Kahoʻolawe, and from almost sea level to 3,000 ft (910 m). In Australia, the species grows in forest and drier places in rainforest in coastal and subcoastal eastern Queensland and Cape York Peninsula.
