= Lagerstroemia speciosa subsp. intermedia =

Conservation status
- Vulnerable (IUCN 2.3)

Scientific classification
- Kingdom: Plantae
- Clade: Embryophytes
- Clade: Tracheophytes
- Clade: Angiosperms
- Clade: Eudicots
- Clade: Rosids
- Order: Myrtales
- Family: Lythraceae
- Genus: Lagerstroemia
- Species: L. speciosa
- Subspecies: L. s. subsp. intermedia

Trinomial name
- Lagerstroemia speciosa subsp. intermedia (Koehne) Furtado & Montien

Synonyms
- L. intermedia Koehne

Subspecies of tree

Lagerstroemia speciosa subsp. intermedia is a subspecies of plant in the family Lythraceae. It is found in China and Thailand. It is threatened by habitat loss. As of 2010, it was classified as "Vulnerable" on the International Union for Conservation of Nature's Red List.
