= Lebeda intermedia =

Scientific classification
- Kingdom: Animalia
- Phylum: Arthropoda
- Clade: Pancrustacea
- Class: Insecta
- Order: Lepidoptera
- Family: Lasiocampidae
- Genus: Lebeda
- Species: L. intermedia

Binomial name
- Lebeda intermedia Holloway, 1987

Synonyms
- Lebeda metaspila Walker, 1865

Species of moth

Lebeda intermedia is a moth of the family Lasiocampidae first described by Jeremy Daniel Holloway in 1987. It is found in Borneo, Sumatra and Peninsular Malaysia.

The wingspan is 33 mm for males and 49 mm for females

Larvae have been reared on Theobroma.
