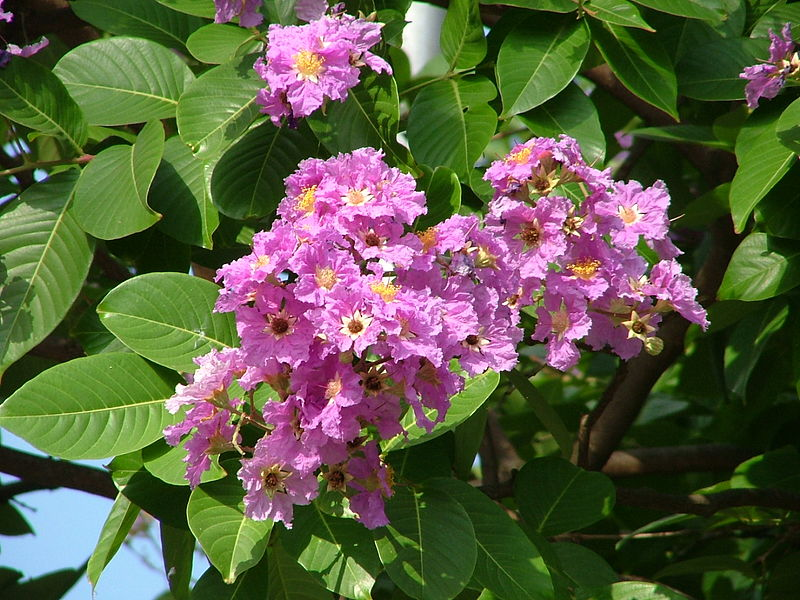
- Flowers on a tree in Kolkata, West Bengal, India

Scientific classification
- Kingdom: Plantae
- Clade: Tracheophytes
- Clade: Angiosperms
- Clade: Eudicots
- Clade: Rosids
- Order: Myrtales
- Family: Lythraceae
- Genus: Lagerstroemia
- Species: L. speciosa

Binomial name
- Lagerstroemia speciosa (L.) Pers.

Synonyms
- Lagerstroemia munchausia L. ex Forsyth f.; Munchausia speciosa L.; Murtughas speciosa (L.) Kuntze

= Lagerstroemia speciosa =

Species of plant

Lagerstroemia speciosa (giant crepe-myrtle, queen's crepe-myrtle, banabá plant, or pride of India, or "queen's flower" or "jarul") is a species of Lagerstroemia native to tropical South Asia, Southeast Asia, and Melanesia. It is a deciduous tree with bright pink to light purple flowers.

The name "queen's Flower" is derived from the specific epithet 'reginae' or 'flosreginae', which means "imperial or flower of the queen". The tree bears beautiful attractive flowers in profusion in purple, lilac or pinkish-violet colours, and lasts for many months. Its timber is next only to teak in its strength. It is called queen crepe myrtle as its flowers look like delicate crêpe paper.

== Subspecies ==
Plants of the World Online includes two subspecies:

- Lagerstroemia speciosa subsp. intermedia (Koehne) Deepu & Pandur.
- Lagerstroemia speciosa subsp. speciosa

== Etymology and names ==
The Latin specific epithet speciosa means 'beautiful'. The names in English and other languages include:

- Assamese: এজাৰ (Ezar)
- Bengali: জারুল (Jarul)
- Burmese: ပျဉ်းမ (Pyinma)
- English: Pride of India, queen crepe myrtle.
- Hindi: जरुल (Jarul)
- Indonesian: Bungur
- Kannada: Hole dasavala
- Kapampangan: Mitla
- Khmer: ត្របែកព្រៃ (Trobaek Prey)
- Malay: Bungor raya (بوڠور راي)
- Malayalam: മണിമരുത്,പൂമരുത്
- Marathi: ताम्हण (Tamhan), जारुळ (Jarul), मोठा बोंडारा(Motha Bondara)
- Tagalog: Banaba
- Tamil: கதலி (மலர் or Kadali)
- Telugu: Manimaruthu
- Thai: อินทนิล (Inthanin)
- Vietnamese: Bằng lăng nước

== Growth ==
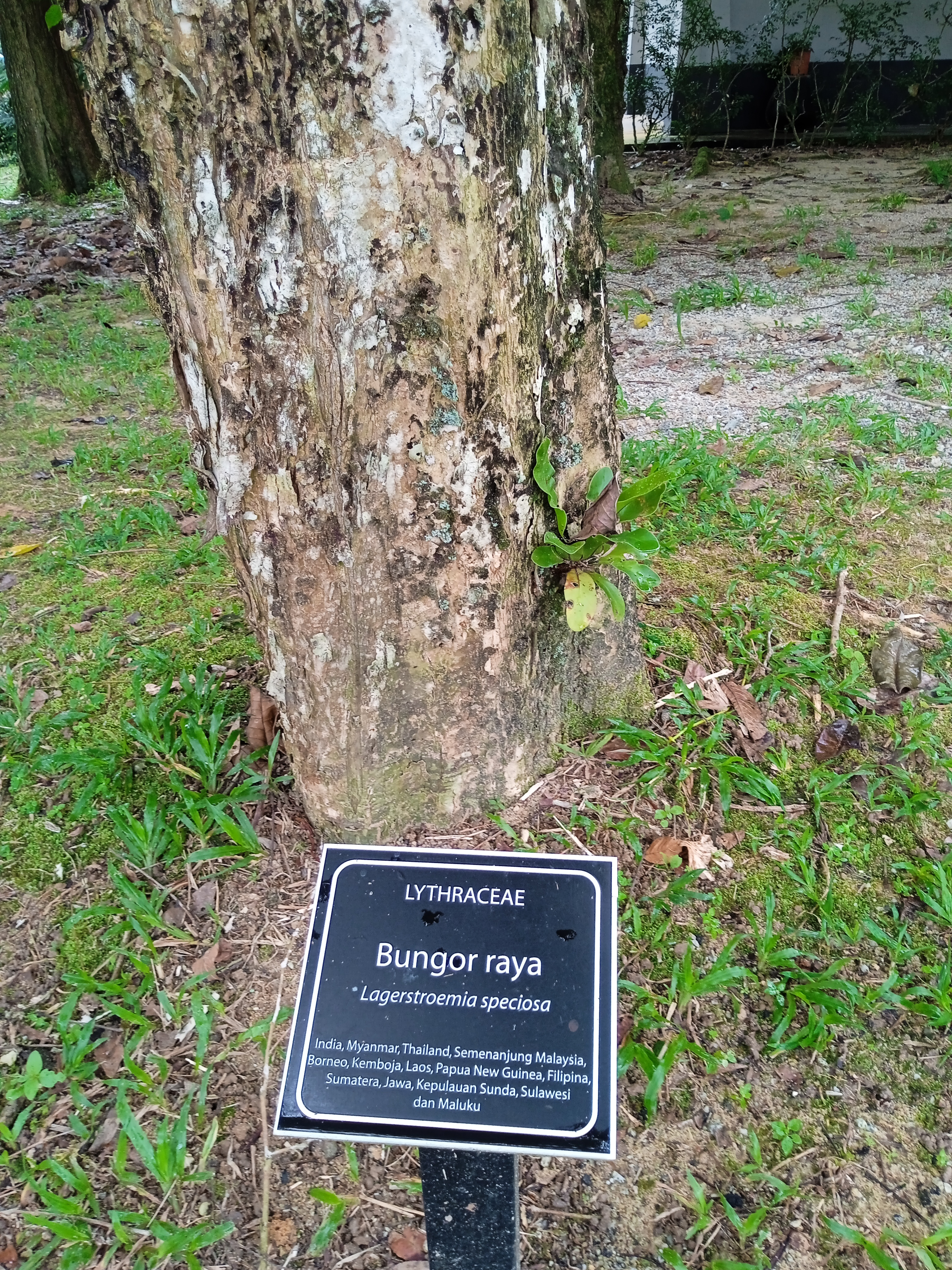
Bark in Selangor, Malaysia

It is a small to medium-sized to large tree growing to 15 metres (49 ft) tall, with an attractive symmetrical crown having a short bole or trunk with smooth, flaky light grey or cream-coloured bark. The leaves are simple, deciduous, oval to elliptic with stout petiole, 8–15 cm (3.1–5.9 in) long and 3–7 cm (1.2–2.8 in) broad, with an acute apex. The flowers are produced in erect panicles 20–40 cm (7.9–15.7 in) long, each flower with six white to purple petals 2–3.5 cm (0.79–1.38 in) long. It has simple leaves with, glabrous, large, elliptic or oblong lanceolate.

The fruits are ellipsoid or sub-globose woody capsules. They are green at first, but later turn brown and finally black. The fruits hang on to the trees. It is easily raised through seeds. It grows best on rich deep alluvial loams and prefers warm, humid and moist soils and can withstand water logging.

Flowering occurs 3–5 years after planting and the main flowering season is April–June with a second flush in July–August. The fruits ripen in November–January. p. 198

== Cultivation and uses ==
It is grown in South East Asia, China India, Bangladesh and the Philippines and even extends to Australia. It is native to India particularly in the western ghats of India covering Belgaum, north and south Kanara, Malabar and Travancore and also in Assam and West Bengal. It is also widely cultivated as an ornamental plant in tropical and subtropical areas.The leaves of the banabá and other parts are used widely in the Philippines, Taiwan, and Japan as a tea preparation. Banabá herb is one of the 69 herbal plants promoted by the Philippine Department of Health (DOH). In Vietnam, the plant's young leaves are consumed as vegetables, and its old leaves and mature fruit are used in traditional medicine for reducing glucose in blood. The seeds have narcotic properties.

== Chemistry ==
Chemical compounds that have been isolated from the extract include corosolic acid, lager-stroemin, flosin B, and reginin A.

== Medicinal uses ==
Giant crepe myrtle's seeds are narcotic, bark and leaves are purgative, roots are astringent, stimulant and febrifuge (fever removing). Decoction of leaves is used in diabetes. In Manipur, its fruit is used locally applied for apathy of the mouth

== Recognition ==
Pride of India or Tāmhan in Marathi is recognised as the state flower of the state of Maharashtra in India.

In Hindu mythology, it is said that worshipping Lord Brahma results in blossoming of these flowers of giant crepe myrtle and banaba tree and as such it brings prosperity to the house.

== In Buddhism ==
In Theravada Buddhism, this plant is said to have been used as the tree for achieving enlightenment, or Bodhi by the eleventh Buddha ("Paduma – පදුම"), and the twelfth Buddha (Naarada – නාරද)t. The plant is known as මුරුත (Murutha) in Sinhala and Mahaasona – මහාසොණ in Sanskrit.

== Gallery ==
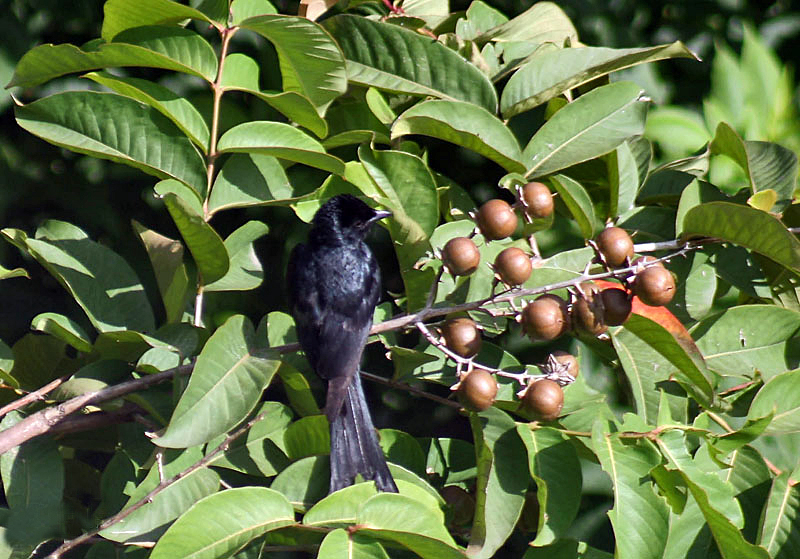
Fruit, leaves & black drongo (Kolkata, West Bengal, India)

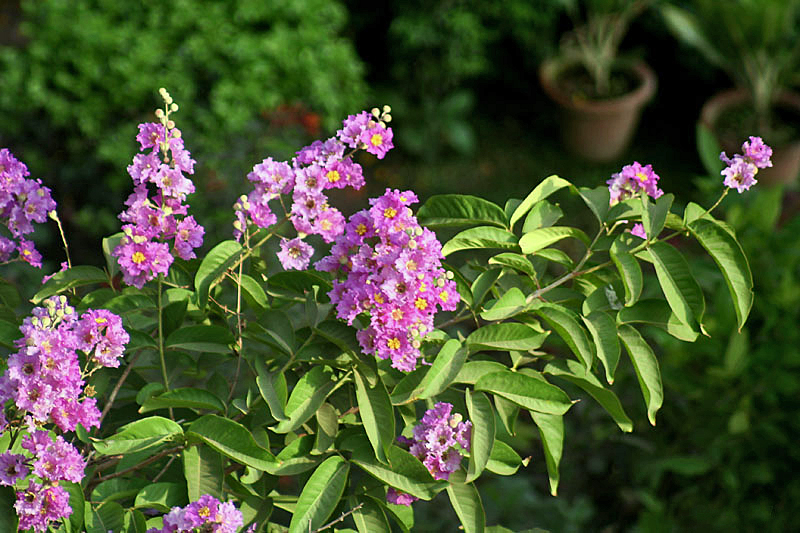
Flowers and leaves (Kolkata, West Bengal, India)

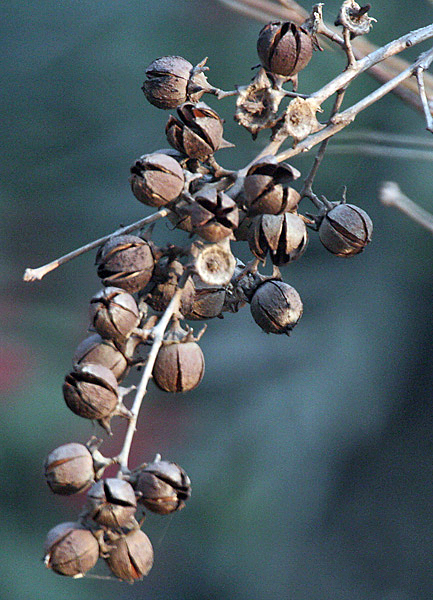
Dried fruits (Kolkata, West Bengal, India)

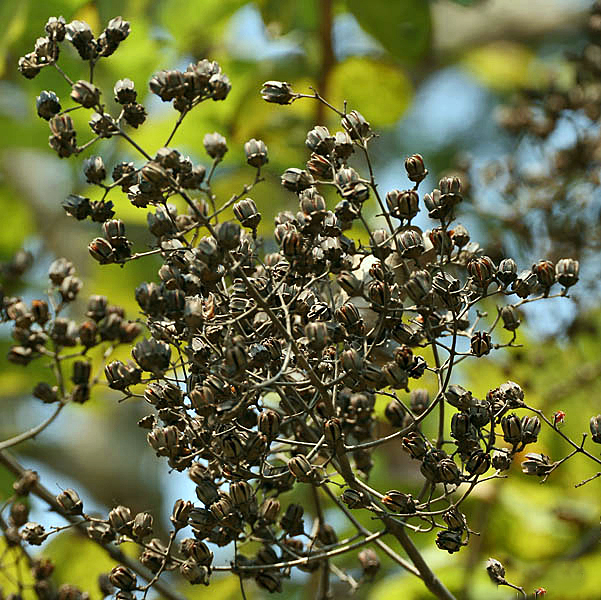
Dried fruits (Kolkata, West Bengal, India)

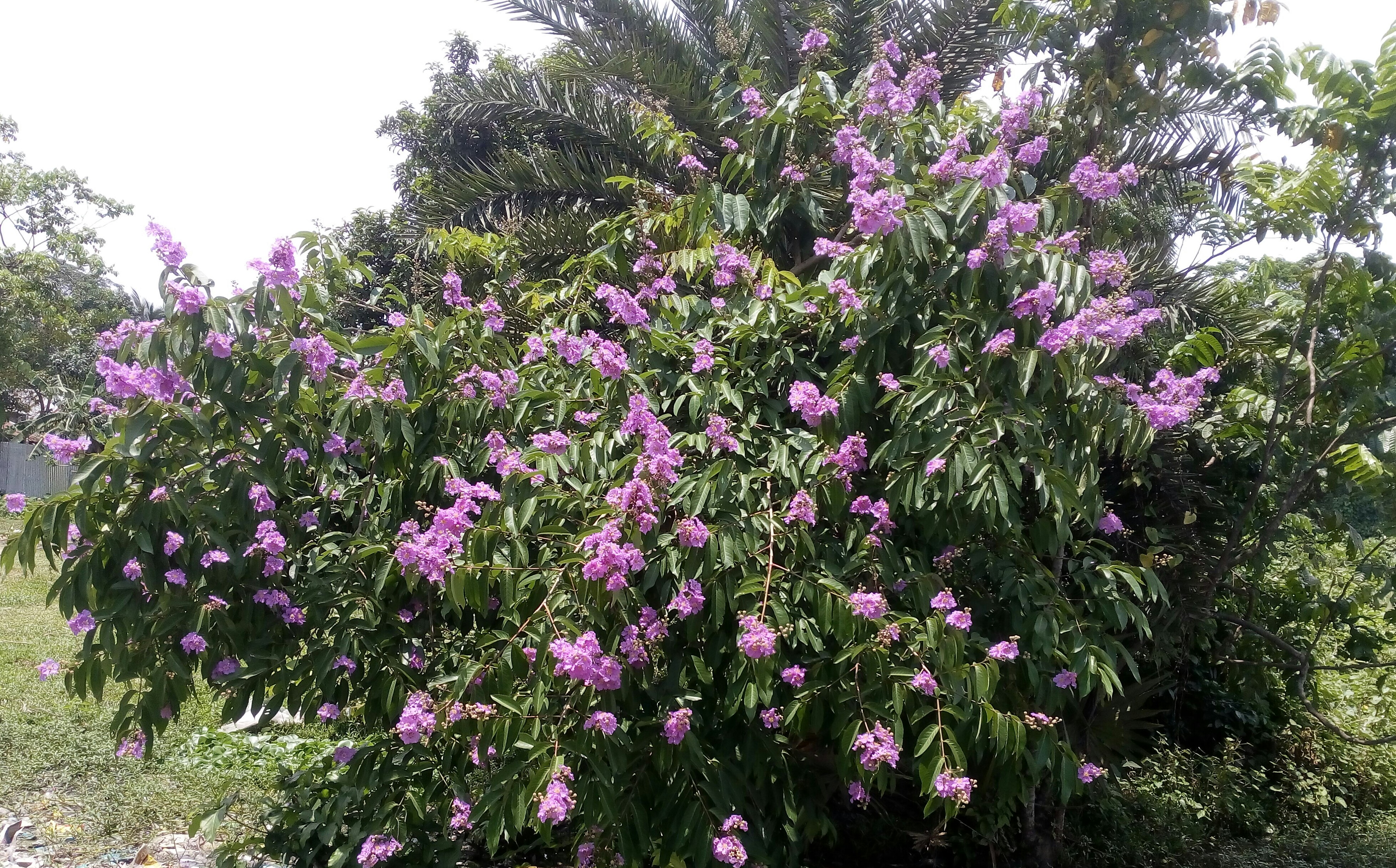
Flowering small tree (Narsingdi, Bangladesh)

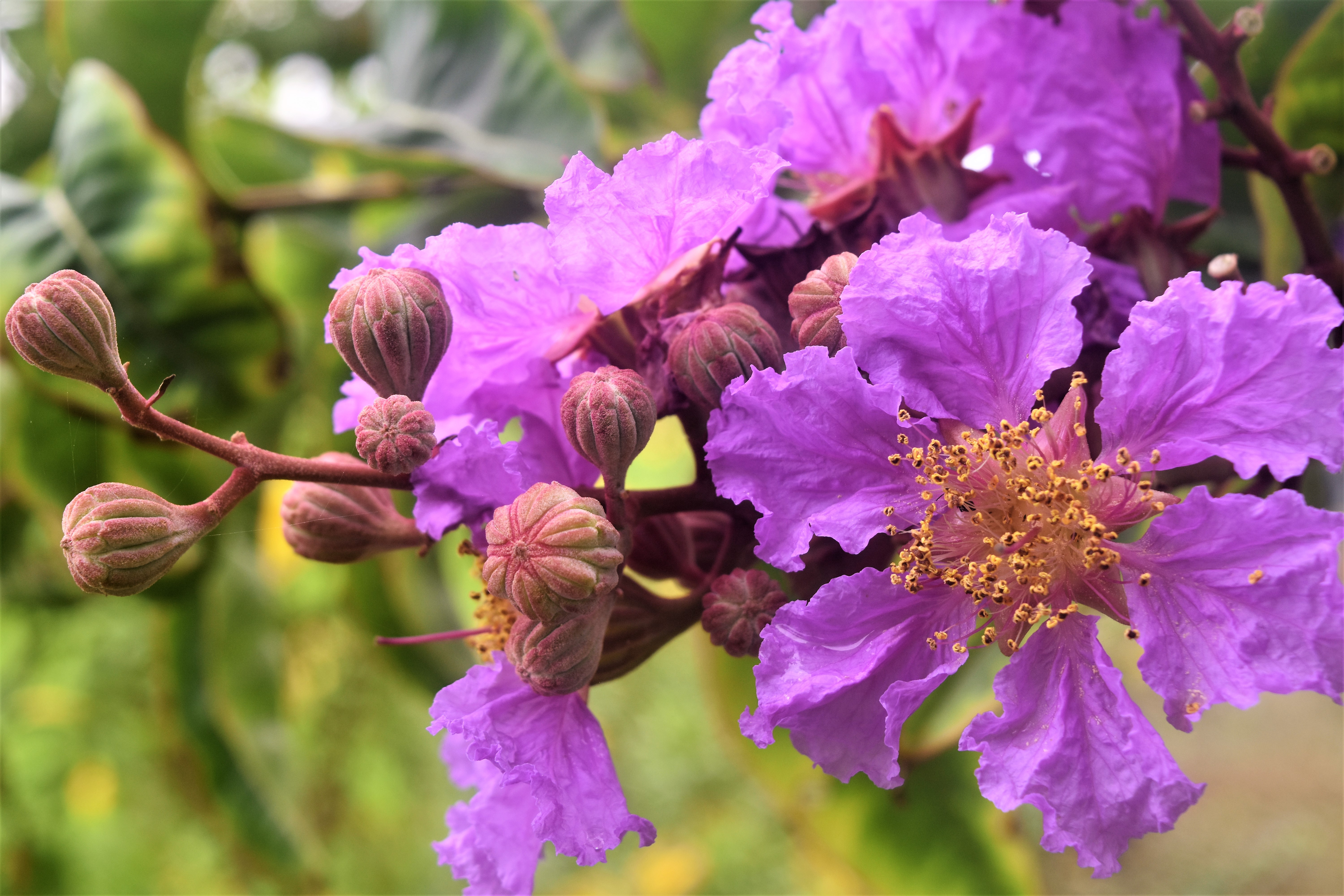
Inflorescence close up (Camarines Sur, Philippines)

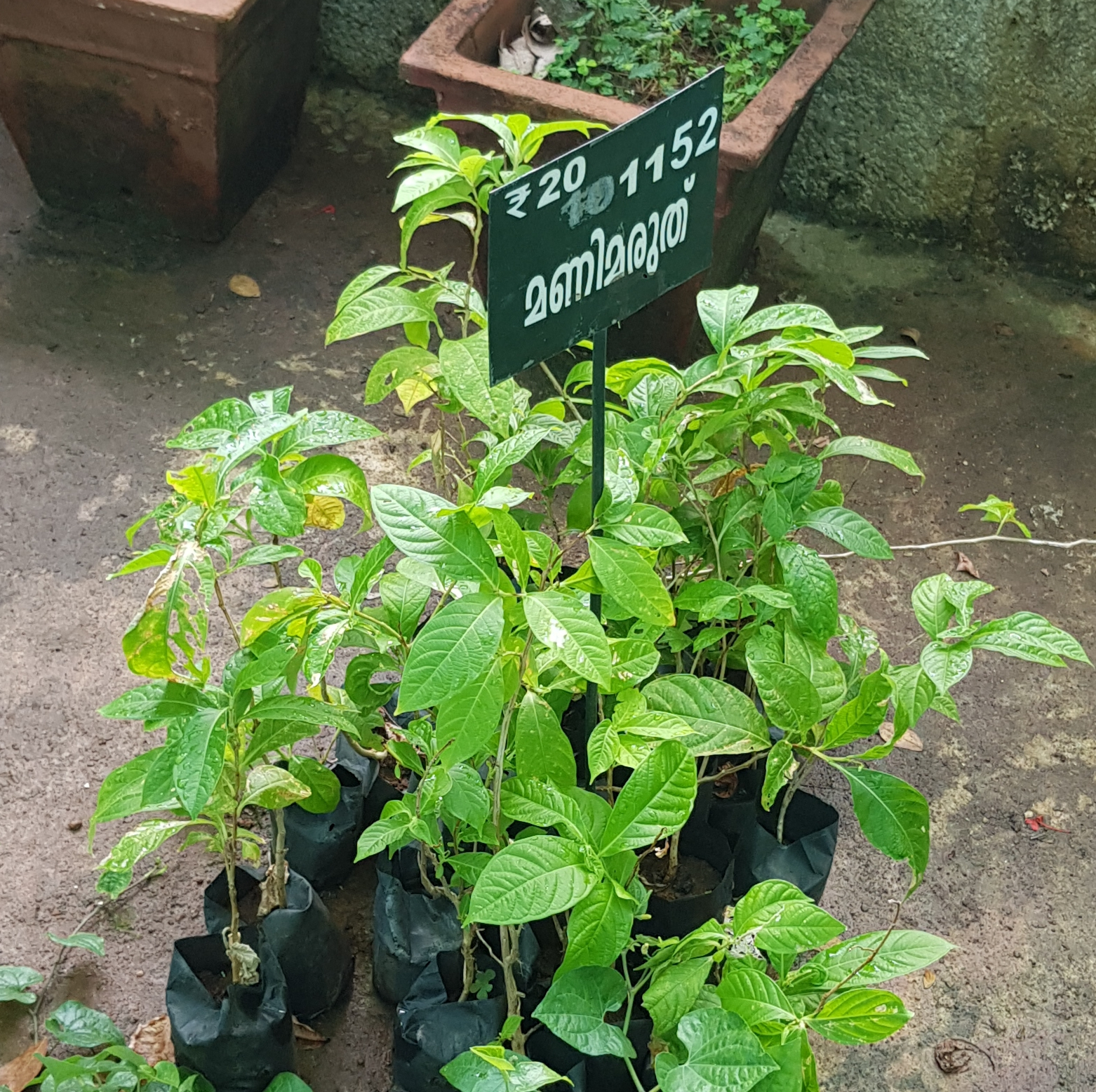
Young plants in polybags (Thrissur, Kerala, India)

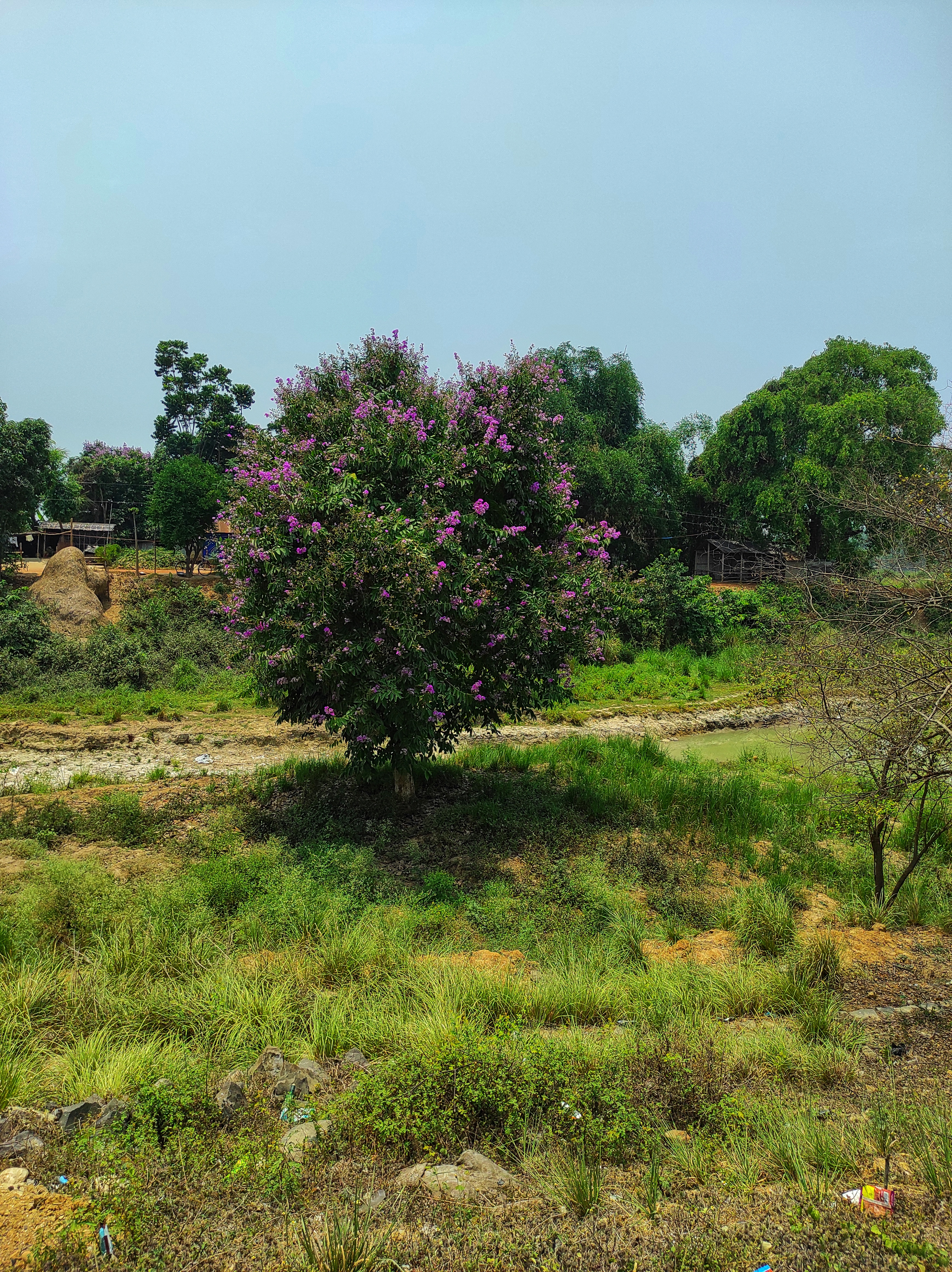
Lagerstroemia Speciosa Tree Malda, West Bengal, India
