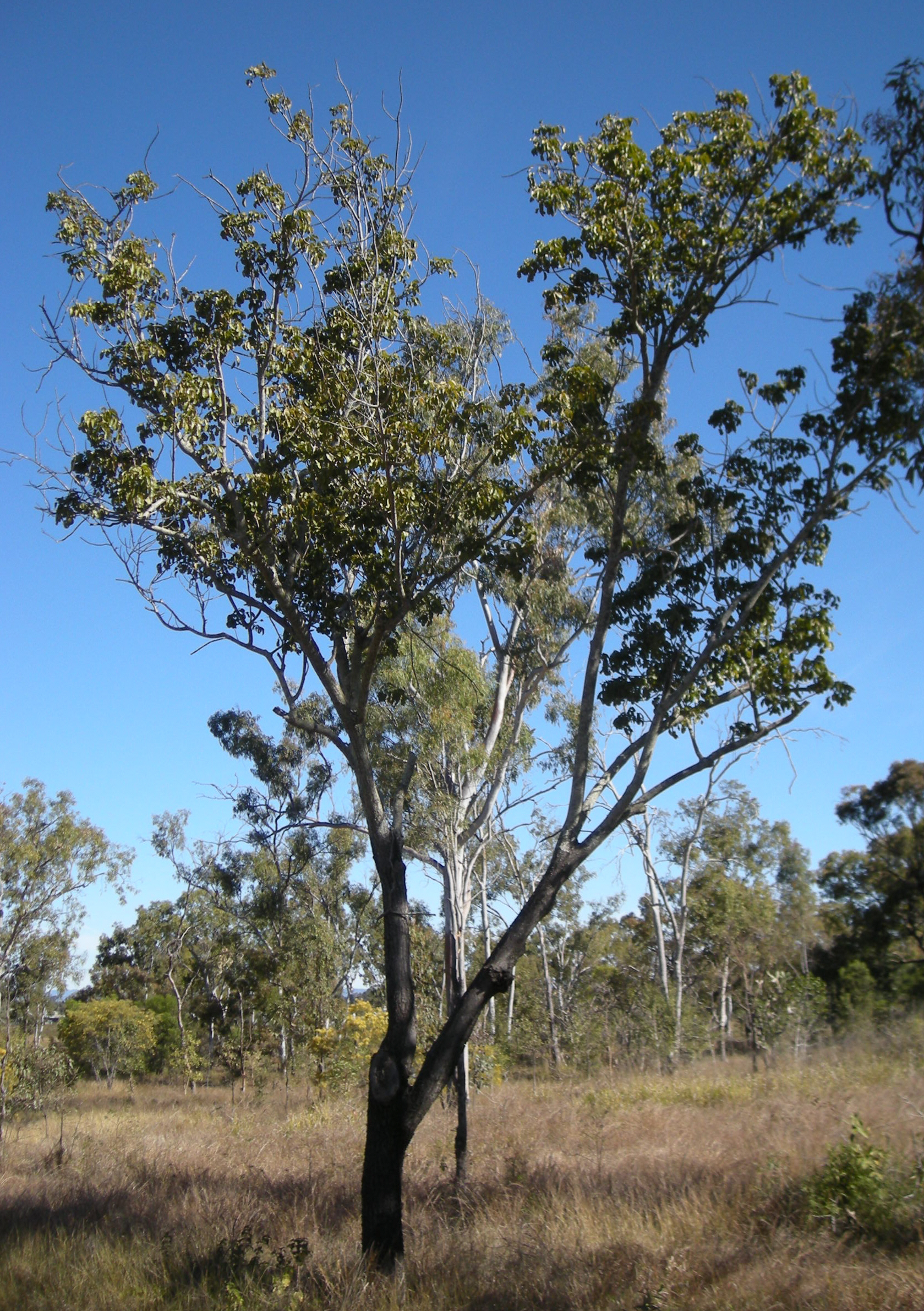
- At Mount Archer National Park, Queensland

Conservation status
- Least Concern (IUCN 3.1)

Scientific classification
- Kingdom: Plantae
- Clade: Tracheophytes
- Clade: Angiosperms
- Clade: Eudicots
- Clade: Asterids
- Order: Lamiales
- Family: Lamiaceae
- Genus: Clerodendrum
- Species: C. floribundum

Binomial name
- Clerodendrum floribundum R.Br.

Synonyms
- Siphonanthus floribundus (R.Br.) Britten

= Clerodendrum floribundum =

Lolly bush

Species of tree

Clerodendrum floribundum, known as the lolly bush or smooth clerodendrum, is a shrub or tree found in Australia and New Guinea. Its habitat is in or at the margins of coastal rainforests, up to 300 metres above sea level. In Western Australia it grows in drier areas, such as rocky sites, gorges, cliffs, floodplains and creek beds.

== Description ==
The leaves may be drawn into a blunt tip, a prickle or a sharp tip. They are variable in shape, usually 4 to 15 cm long, and 2 to 6 cm wide. The young leaves are not as hairy as those of the related downy chance (Clerodendrum tomentosum). The generic term Clerodendrum is from the Greek, meaning 'lottery tree'. The term 'lottery' refers to an unsure possibility of a medicinal value from plants of this genus. The specific epithet floribundum refers to the abundance of flowers in showy heads. The fruit is a black drupe, growing on an enlarged red fleshy calyx. It appears glossy and succulent, giving rise to the common name 'lolly bush'.

Although usually a small tree, it has been recorded at 30 metres tall with a stem diameter of 30 cm at Booyong Flora Reserve, in northern New South Wales. White fragrant flowers form in cymes between September and December.

== Taxonomy ==
This species was first described in 1810 by the prolific Scottish botanist Robert Brown in his book Prodromus Florae Novae Hollandiae. Brown added the abbreviation "v.v." after the description, which stands for the Latin vide viva (seen alive), signifying that his description was based on material he collected himself.

=== Infraspieces ===
Six varieties have been named in various publications, as follows:

- Clerodendrum floribundum var. angustifolium
- Clerodendrum floribundum var. attenuatum
- Clerodendrum floribundum var. coriaceum
- Clerodendrum floribundum var. latifolium
- Clerodendrum floribundum var. medium
- Clerodendrum floribundum var. ovatum

Of these, as of June 2024, only the first, second and last are recognised in the Australian Plant Census, only C. f. ovatum is recognised by Plants of the World Online, all are disputed in Queensland Herbarium's Wildnet database, the first, second, third and last are recognised by the Northern Territory Herbarium, and the first, third and last are accepted by the Western Australian Herbarium. It appears that no authority accepts the variety C. f. medium.

== Distribution ==
There is some debate whether this plant is found in rainforests of the Illawarra. A.G.Floyd says it is found as far south as Batemans Bay and growing north to Cape York at the northernmost point of the continent, and then west through the Northern Territory and Western Australia. However, the Royal Botanic Gardens, Sydney say records in the far southeast may not be accurate.

== Ecology ==
The leaves are host to the caterpillar of the fiery jewel butterfly.

== Cultivation ==
Regeneration is from fresh seeds or cuttings. It is an easy plant to grow, although it requires plenty of water.

== Gallery ==
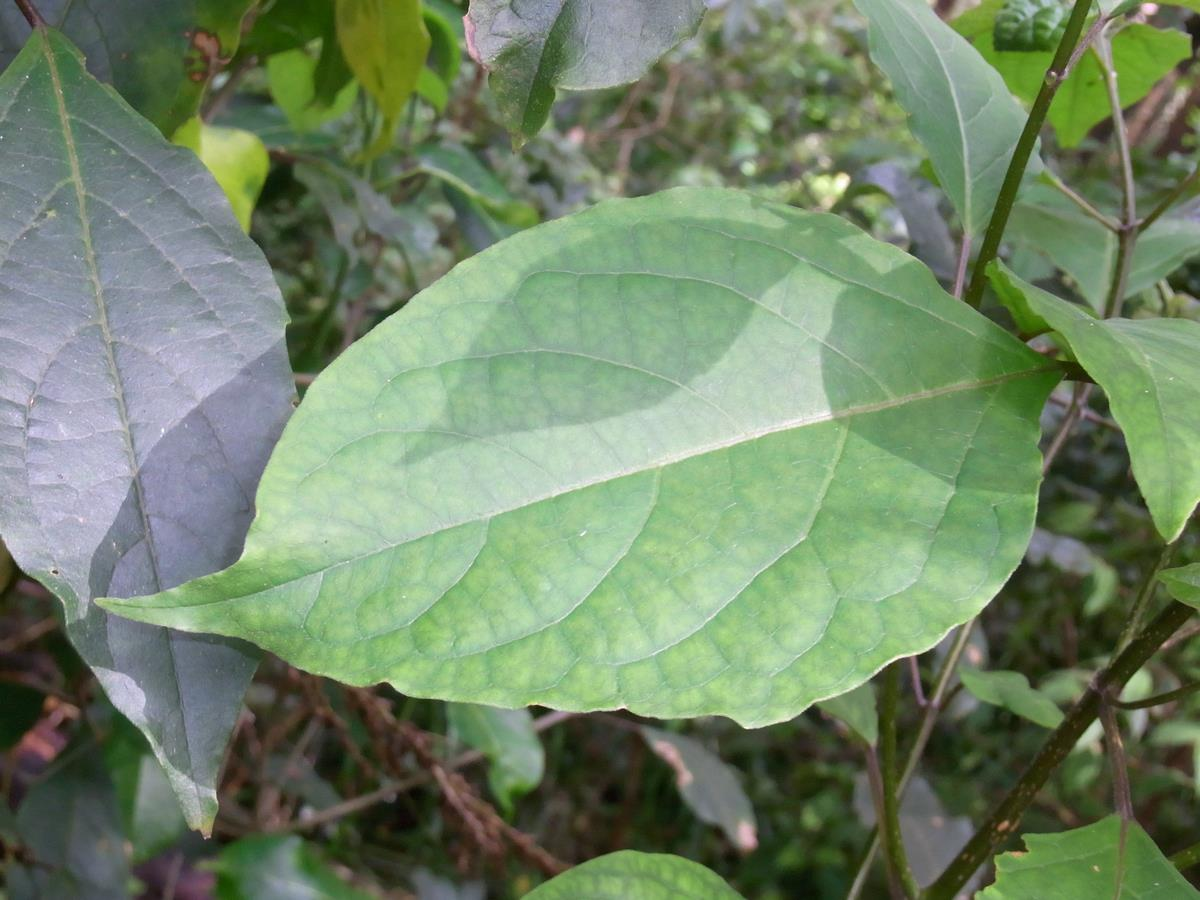
Leaves, Mount Keira, NSW

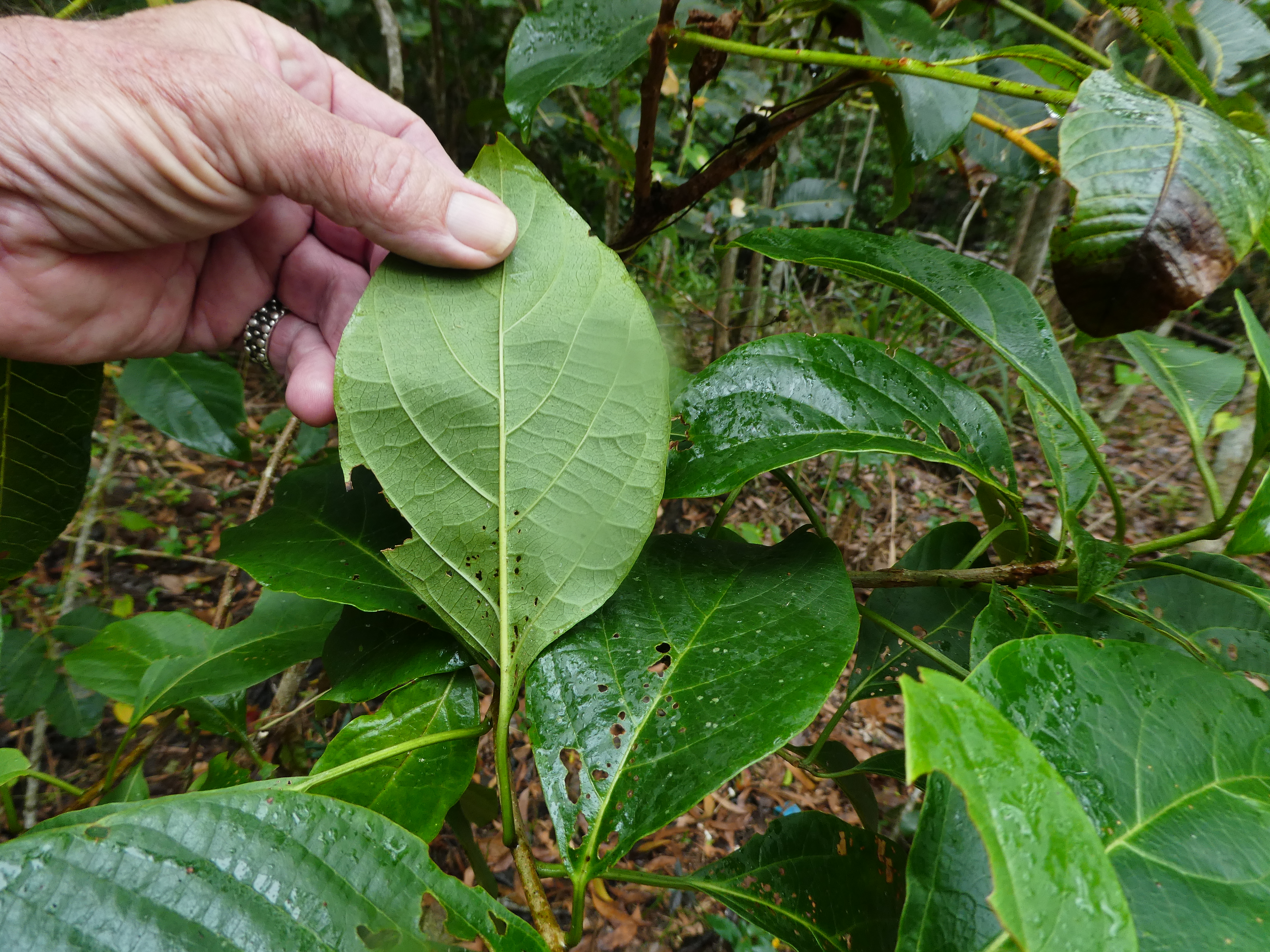
Underside of leaves, Cairns, Queensland

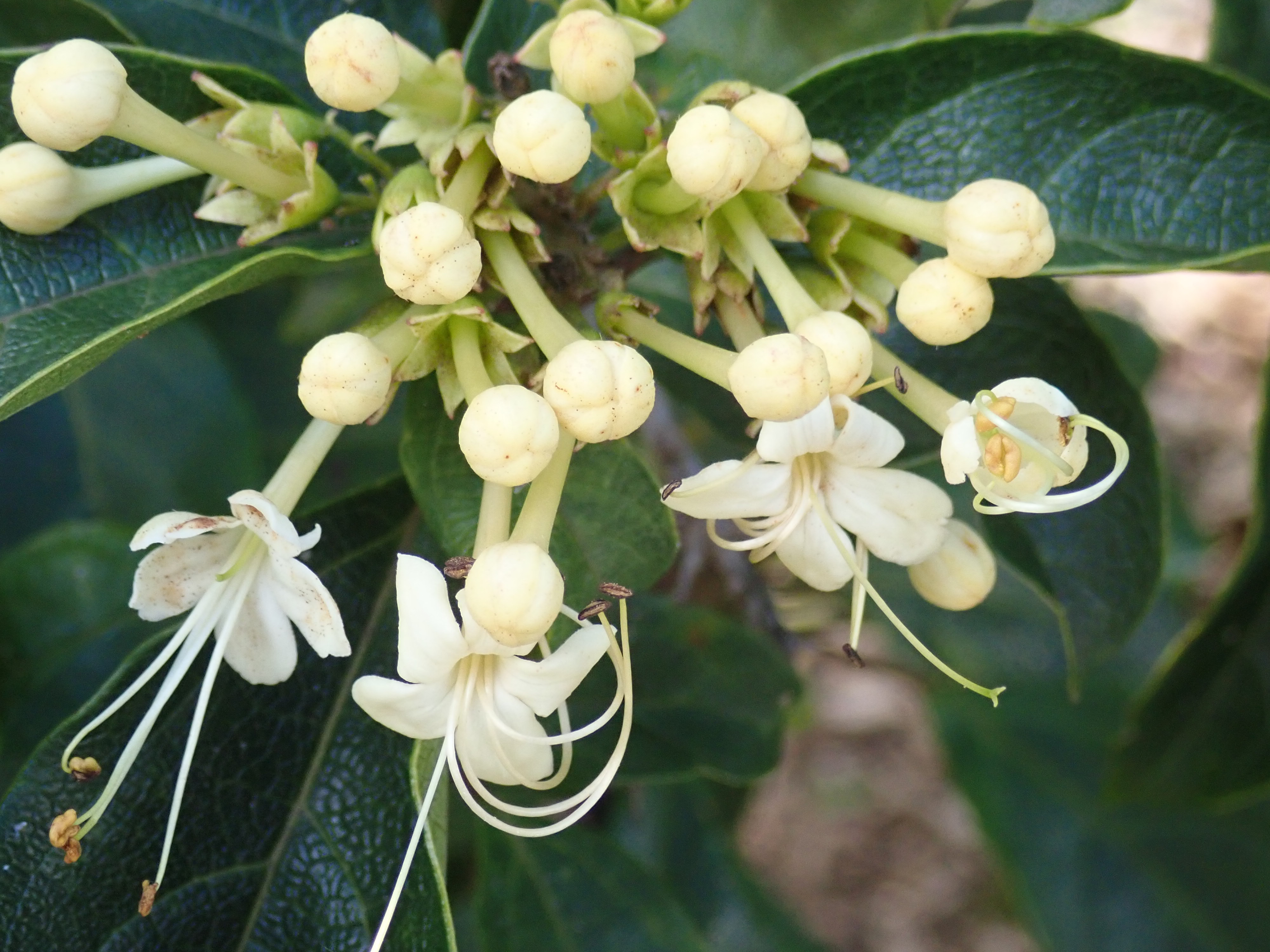
Flowers and buds

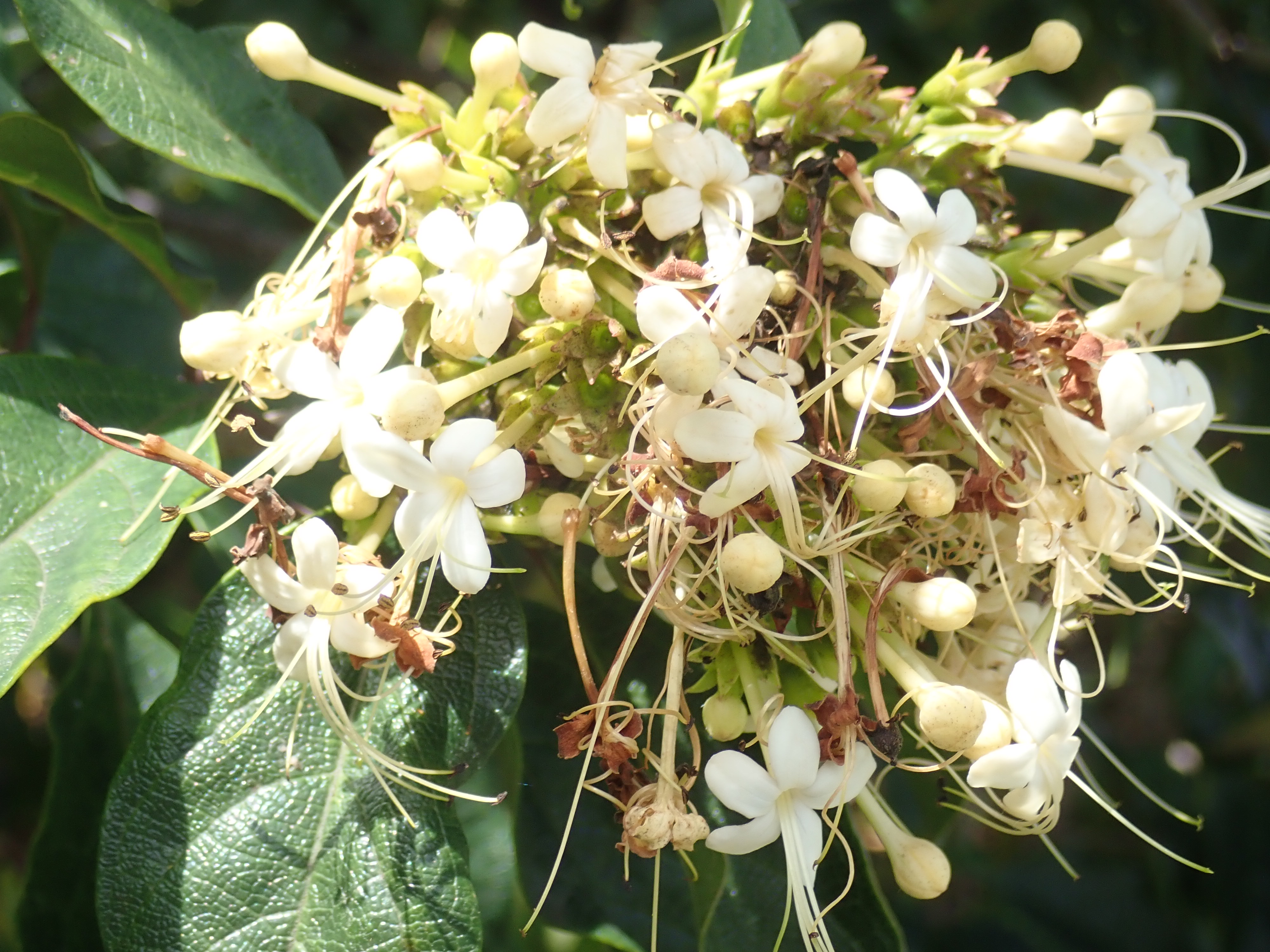
In flower at Royal Botanic Garden, Sydney, NSW

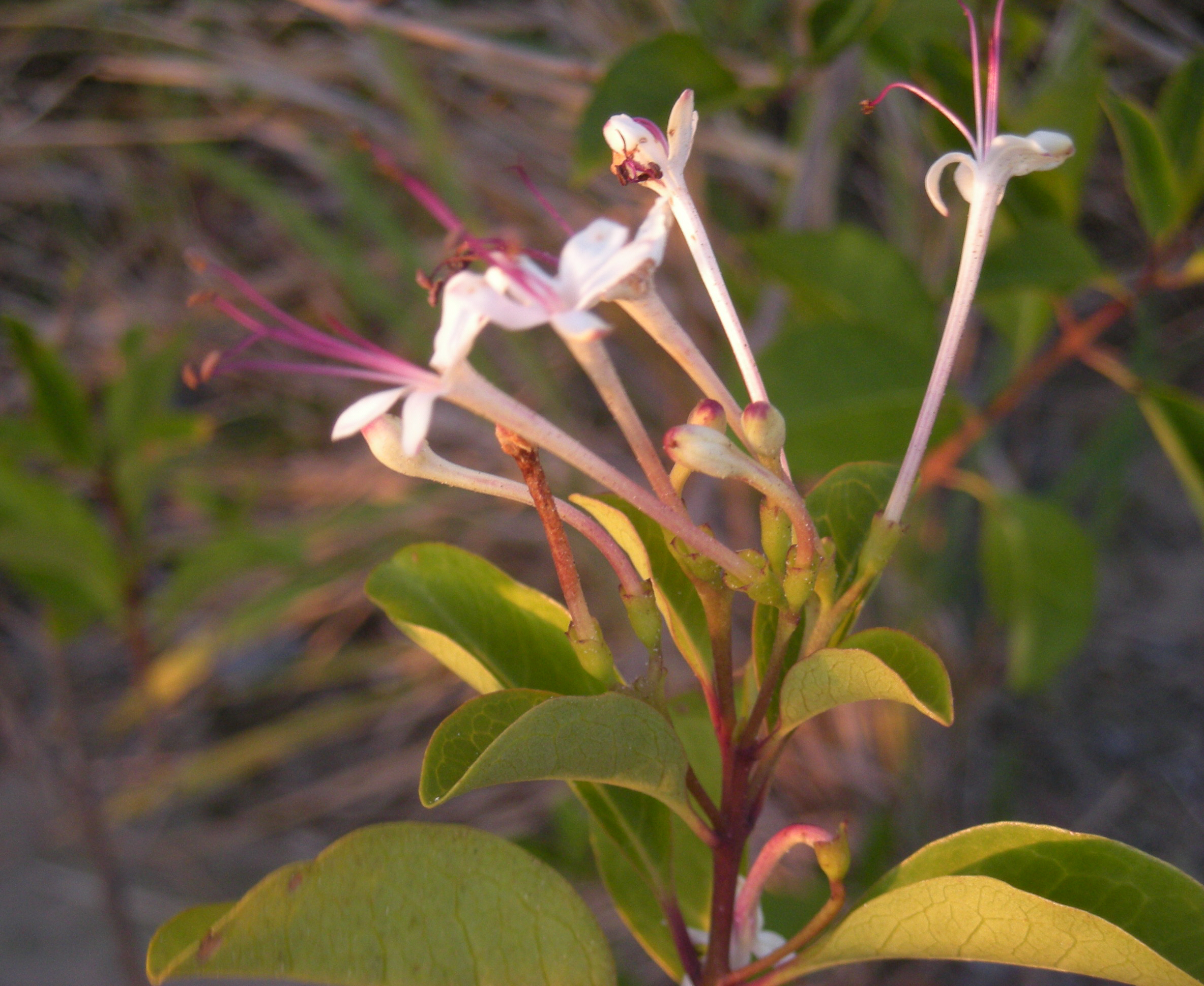
Flowers

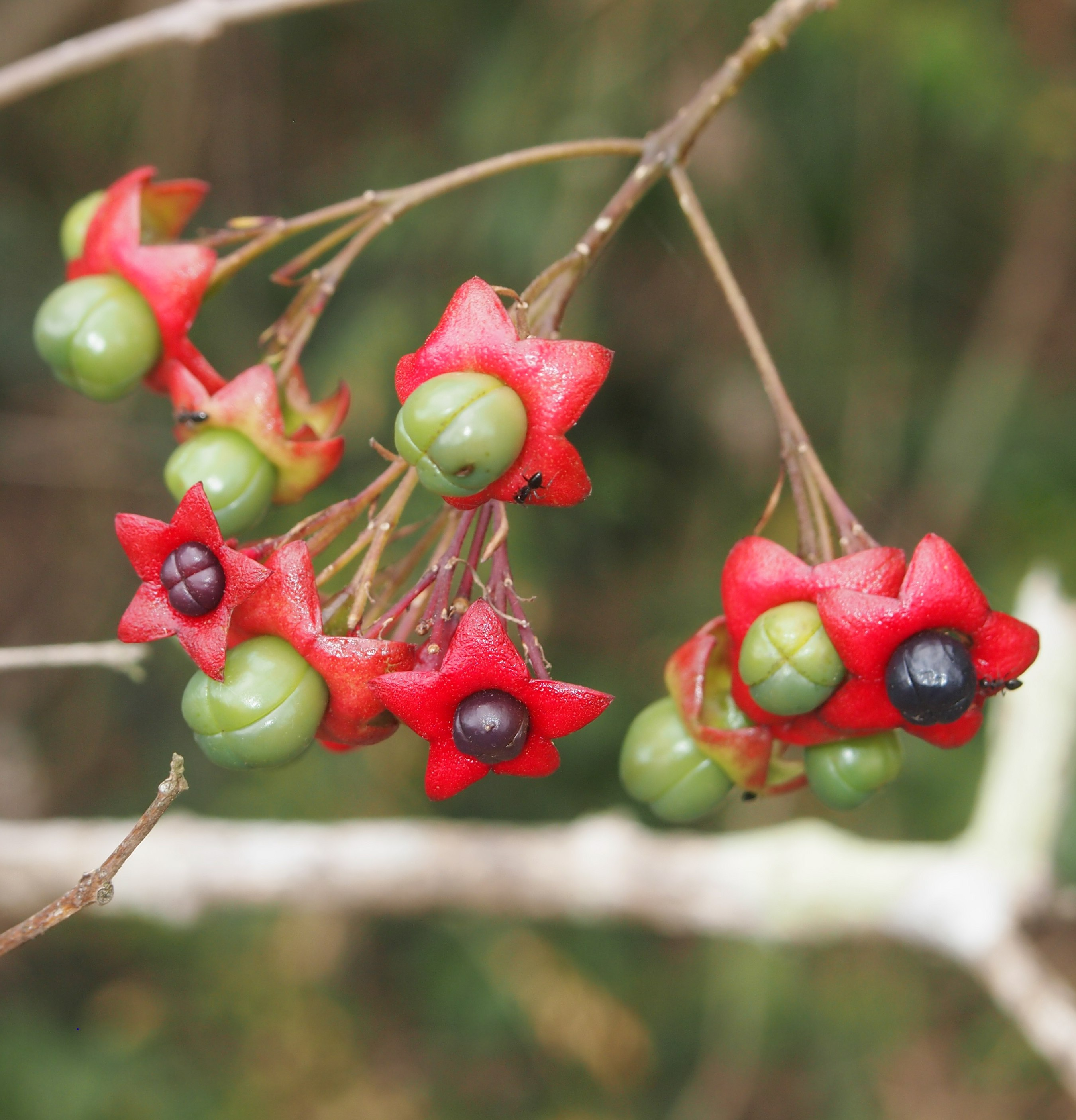
Fruit
