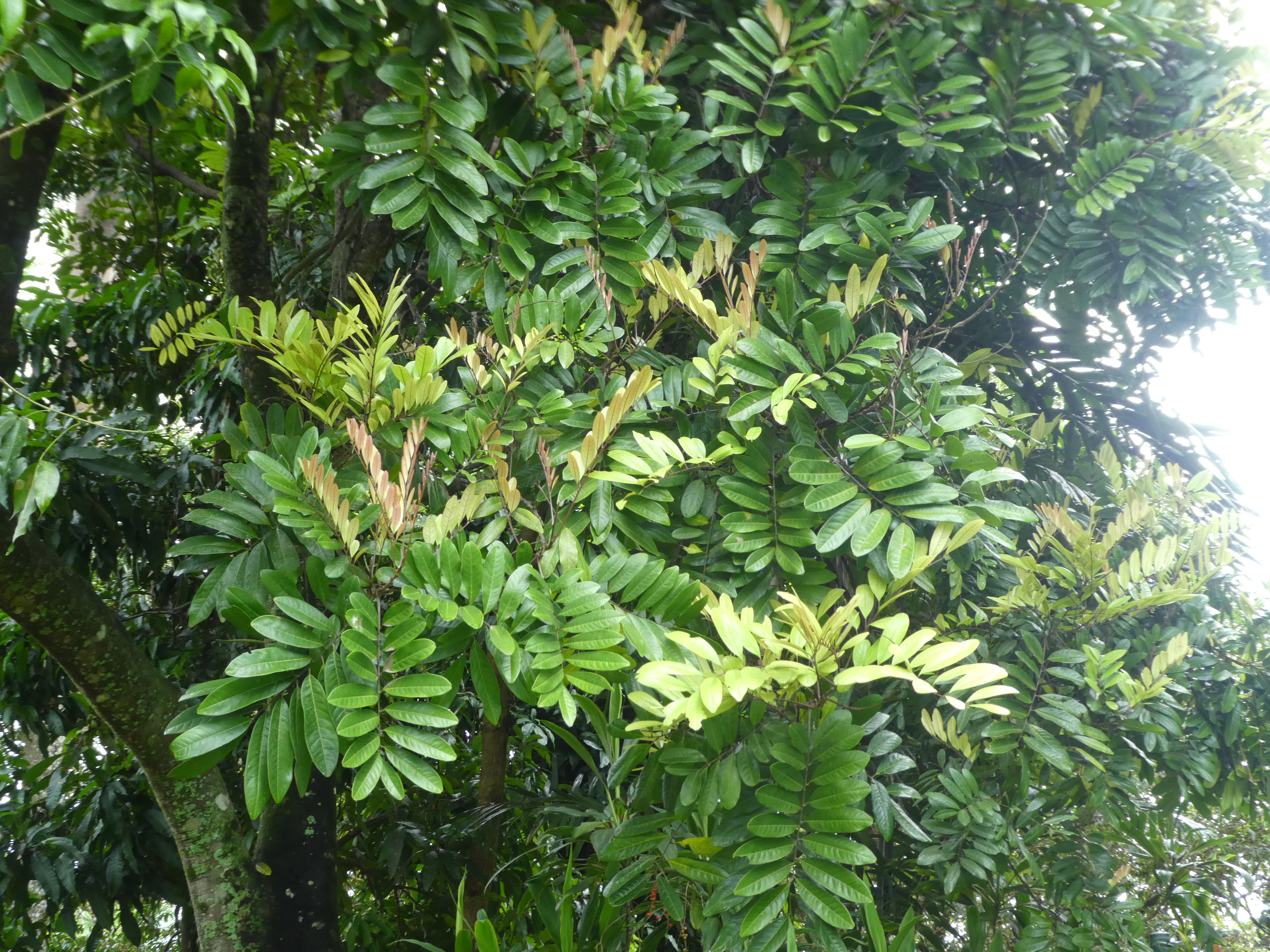
- Foliage

Conservation status
- Least Concern (NCA)

Scientific classification
- Kingdom: Plantae
- Clade: Tracheophytes
- Clade: Angiosperms
- Clade: Eudicots
- Clade: Rosids
- Order: Sapindales
- Family: Sapindaceae
- Genus: Diploglottis
- Species: D. alaticarpa

Binomial name
- Diploglottis alaticarpa W.E.Cooper

= Diploglottis alaticarpa =

Species of flowering plant

Diploglottis alaticarpa is a plant in the maple and lychee family Sapindaceae which is endemic to northeast Queensland, Australia. It was first recognised as a distinct species in 1994 and was formally described in 2014.

== Description ==
Diploglottis alaticarpa is an evergreen medium-sized tree up to 22 m (72 ft) tall with a trunk diameter (DBH) up to 40 cm (16 in). The new growth is sericeous (silky) and silvery pink. The compound leaves are arranged alternately on the branches and may reach up to 41 cm (16 in) long including the petiole. They have between 9 and 19 stiff, glabrous (hairless) leaflets measuring up to 18 cm (7.1 in) long by 6 cm (2.4 in) wide and generally oblong to oblong-elliptic in shape.

The inflorescence is a sericeous panicle produced in the leaf axils measuring up to 24 cm (9.4 in) long. The flowers are either staminate (functionally male) or bisexual, up to 5 mm (0.20 in) long and held on 2 mm (0.08 in) long pedicels. The calyx is 5-lobed, each of which is about 2 mm (0.08 in) long and wide.

The fruit is a yellow/green capsule with 3 segments, 1 or 2 of which may be aborted. It is sparsely covered in minute hairs on the outside, the junctions of the segments are winged in the basal half (i.e. the end attached to the tree). The walls of the capsule are thick and fleshy, and on the inside they are orange and silky hairy. There is 1 seed per matured segment, brown, up to 26 mm × 22 mm (1.02 in × 0.87 in), and fully enclosed in an orange/red aril.

=== Similar species ===
Diploglottis alaticarpa can be distinguished from the similar species D. bracteata by its silvery pink new growth (versus silvery green for D. bracteata), the midvein of the leaf flush with the blade (vs. flush in a deep groove), and the winged fruit (vs. not winged).

=== Phenology ===
Flowering has been observed in October and November, while fruit have been seen in December and January.

== Taxonomy ==
This species was first described by the Australian botanist Wendy Elizabeth Cooper, who published her paper (titled Diploglottis alaticarpa W.E.Cooper (Sapindaceae), a new species from Queensland's Wet Tropics) in the Queensland Herbarium's official journal Austrobaileya in 2014. The first collection of this species was made prior to 1994 by the Australian botanist Rigel Jensen, and it was given the provisional name "Sapindaceae (Palmerston Rigel Jensen s.n.)", however these specimens were lost at some point. Cooper's description is based on herbarium specimens of subsequent collections, as well as her own field observations.

=== Etymology ===
The genus name Diploglottis comes from the Neo-Latin words diplo- meaning double, and glottis meaning tongue, which is a reference to the two tongue-like scales on the petals. The species epithet alaticarpa created from the Latin words alatus meaning winged, and carpus meaning fruit. It is a reference to the fruit that is distinctly winged, a characteristic that had not been observed in species of Diploglottis prior to that point.

== Distribution and habitat ==
This species inhabits well developed rainforest on basalt soils, where it is an understorey tree. The natural range is very small, limited to a part of the Wooroonooran National Park between the North and South branches of the Johnstone River, at altitudes from 100 m (330 ft) to 360 m (1,180 ft). The estimated area of occupancy is just 28 km^{2} (11 sq mi). (Note: For a definition of Area of Occupancy see this page at the Atlas of Living Australia)

== Conservation ==
This species is listed by the Queensland Government's Department of Environment, Science and Innovation as least concern. As of 1 February 2024, it has not been assessed by the International Union for Conservation of Nature (IUCN).

== Gallery ==
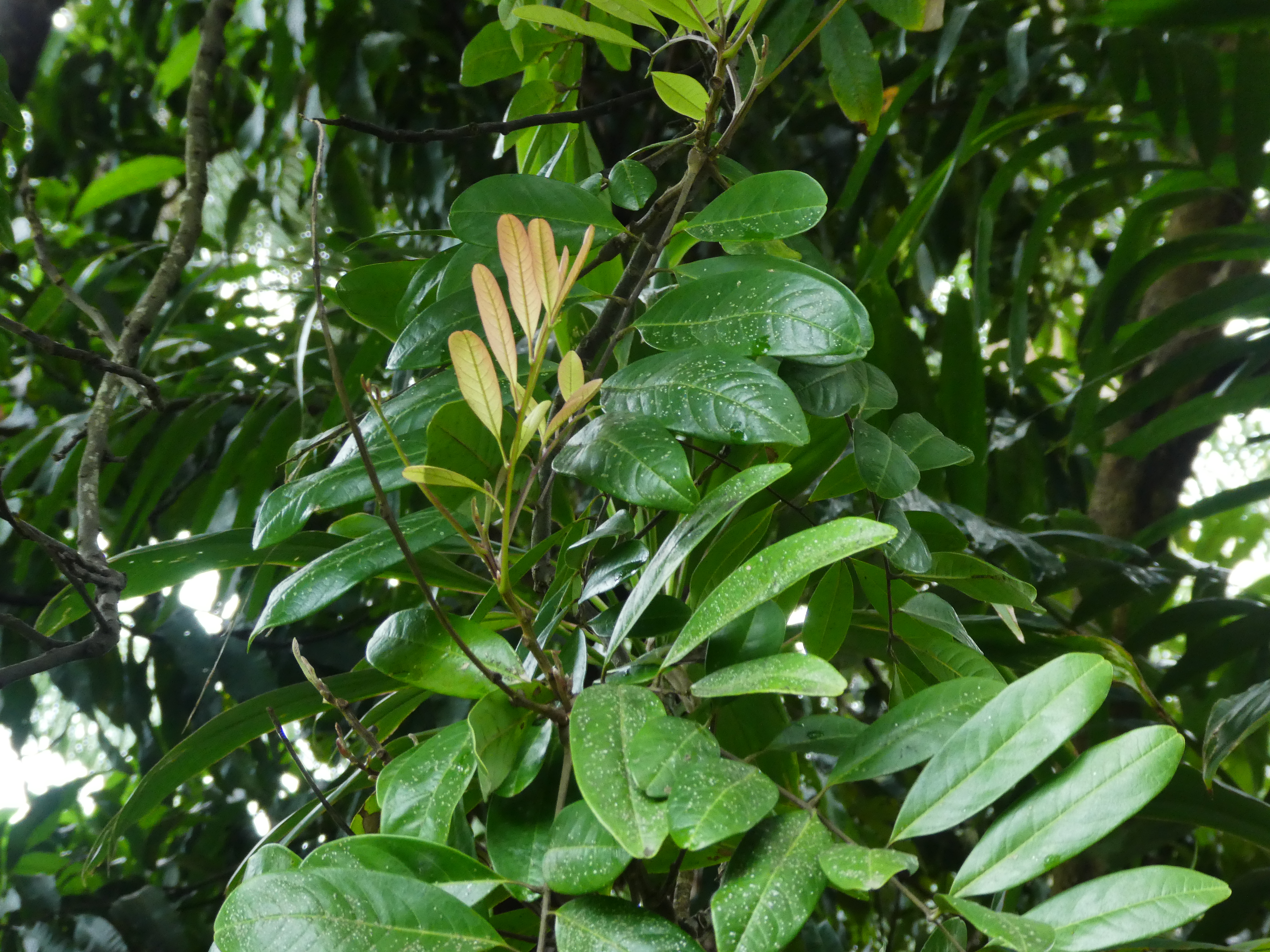
New growth flush

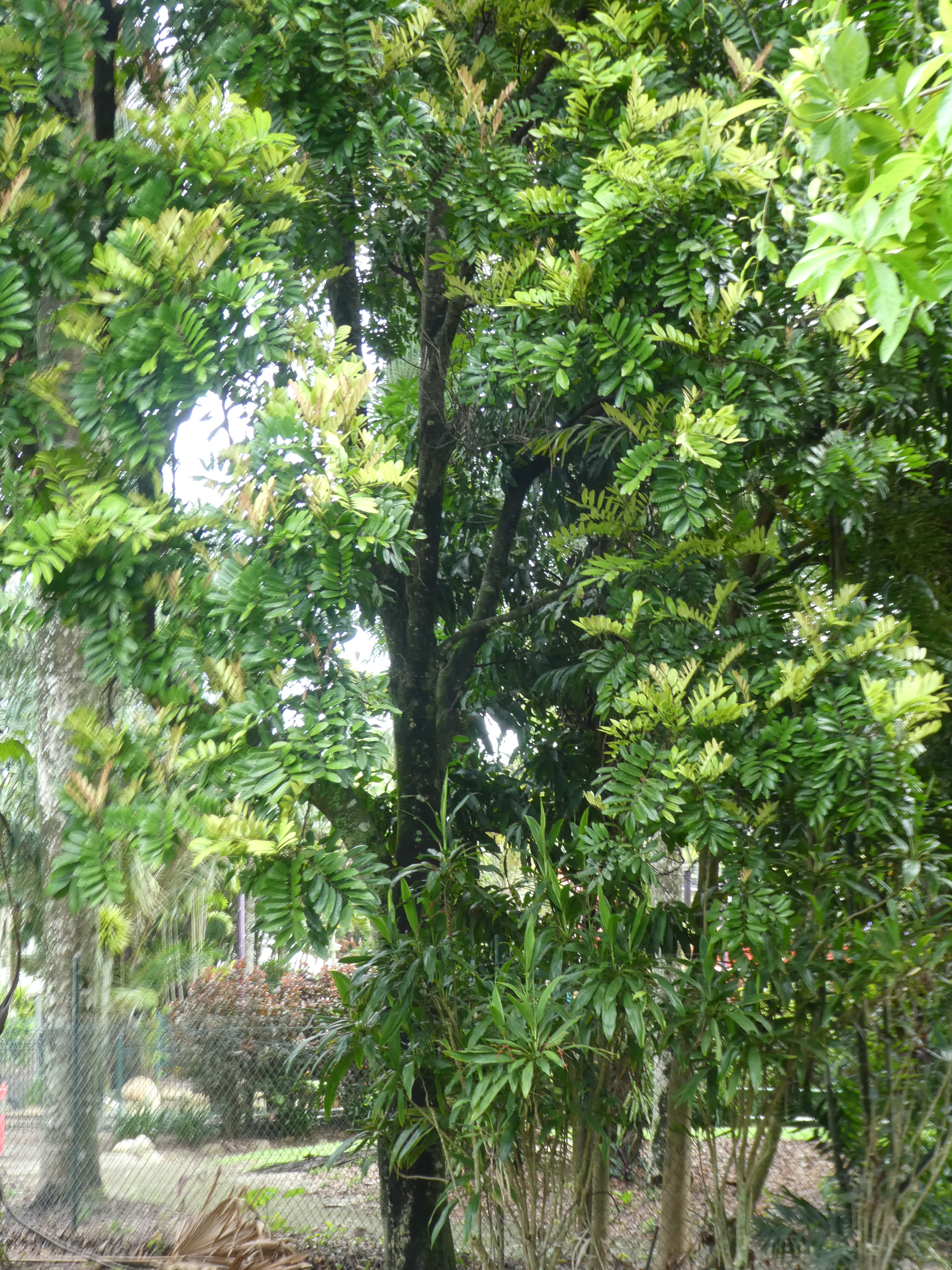
Tree cultivated in Cairns

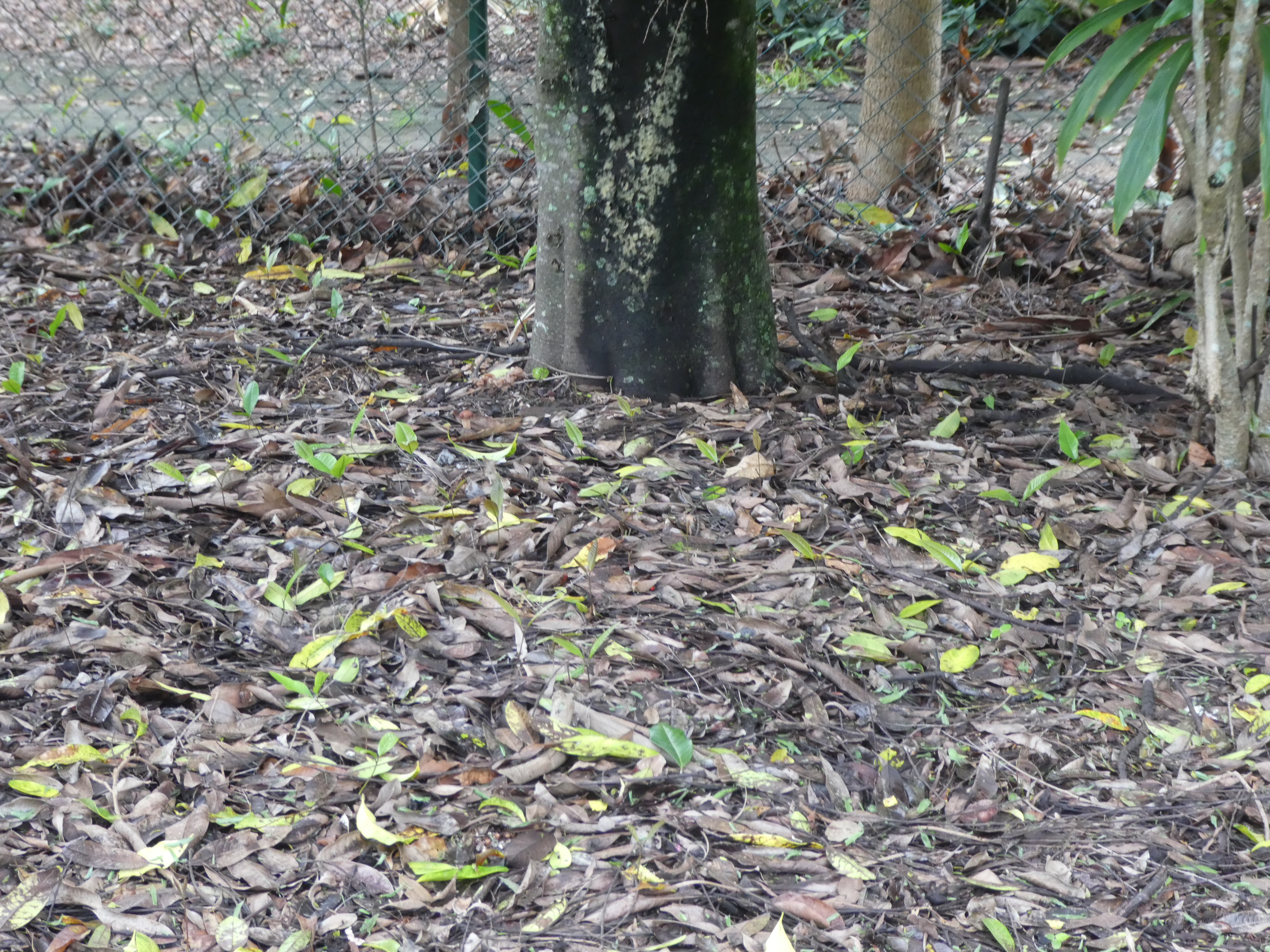
Base of trunk and numerous seedlings

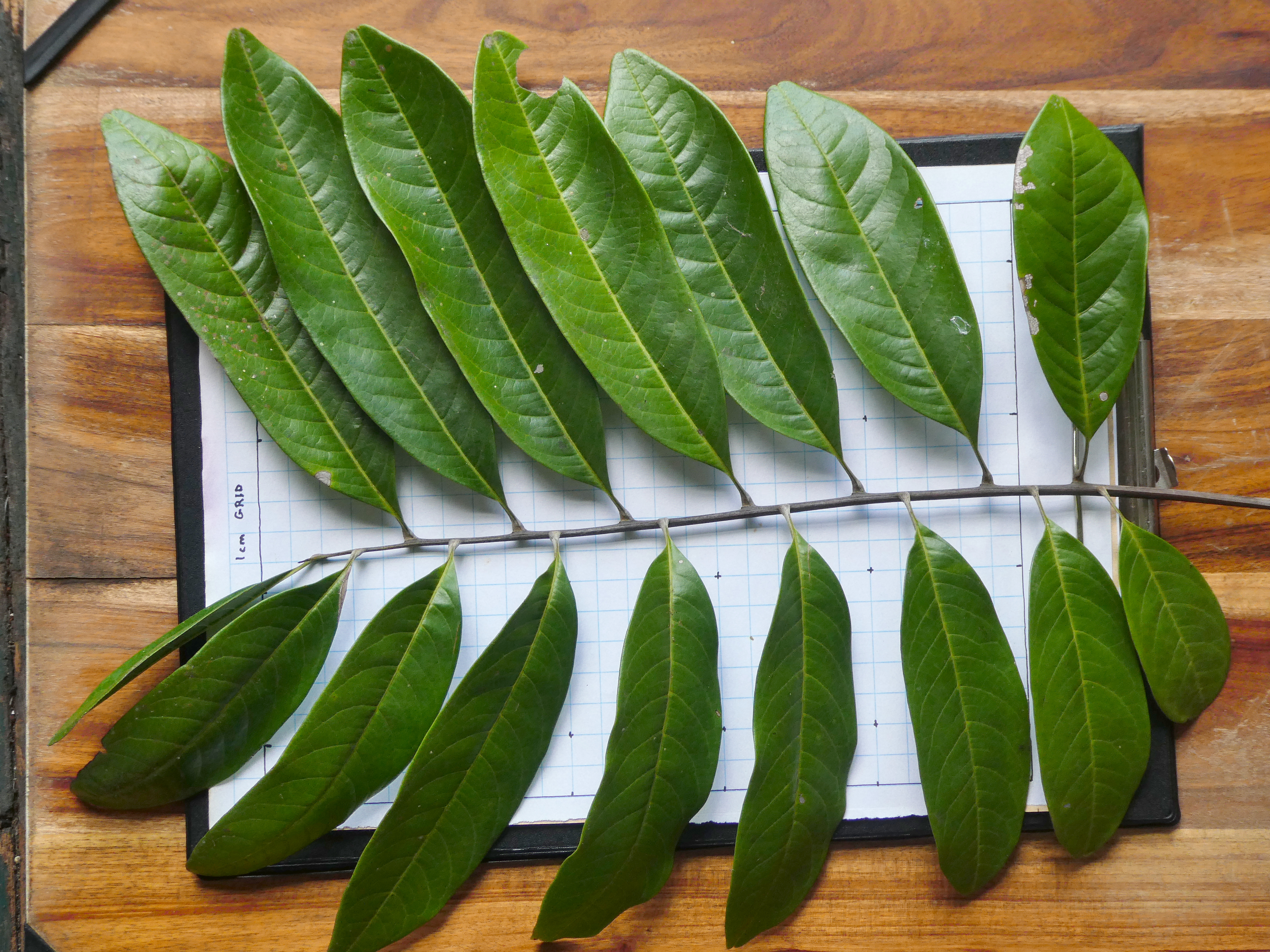
Compound leaf

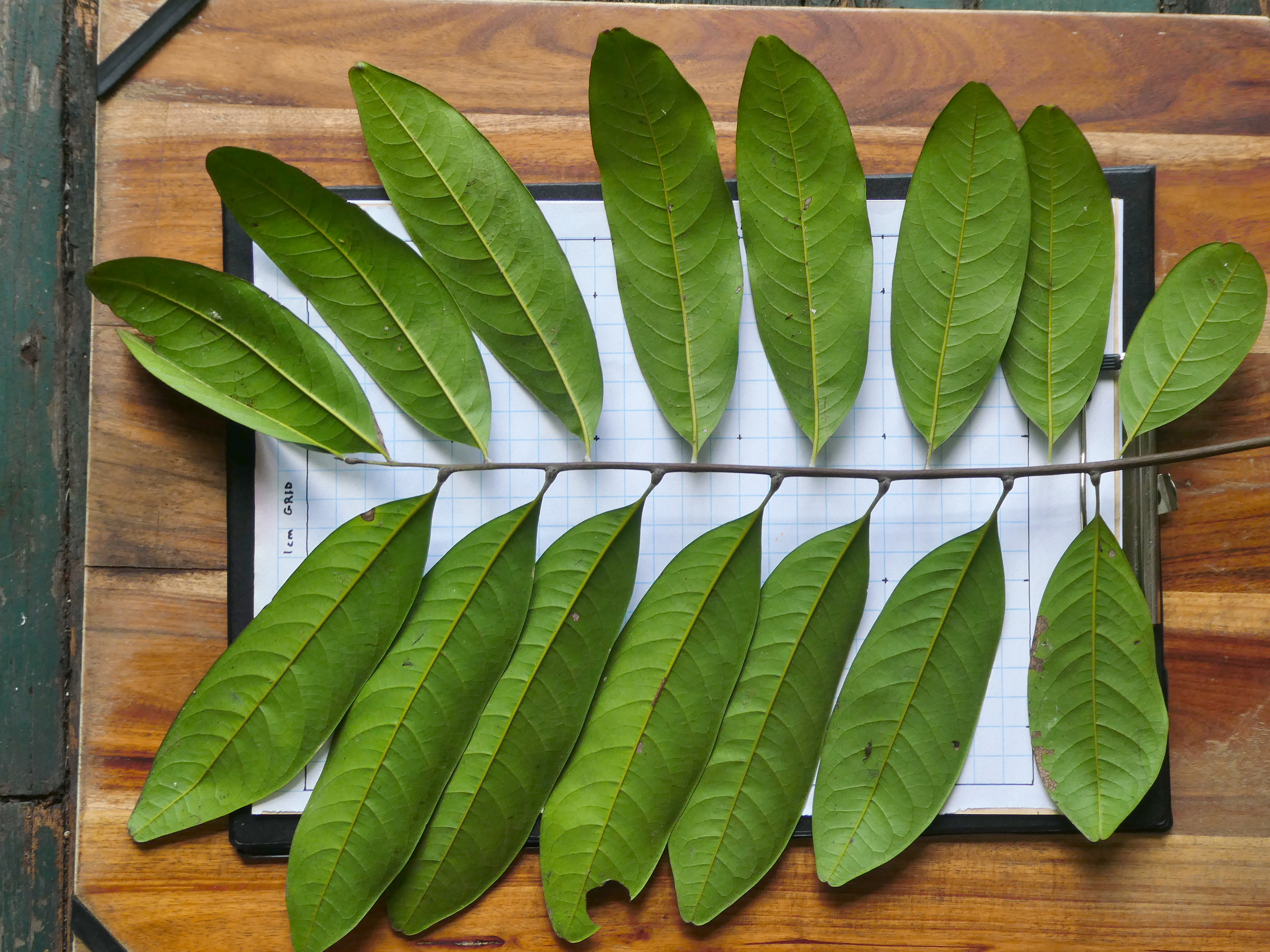
Compound leaf, underside
