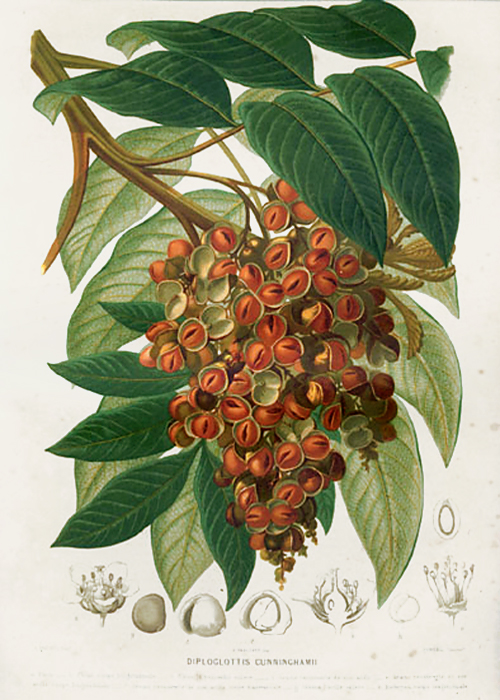
- Diploglottis australis

Scientific classification
- Kingdom: Plantae
- Clade: Tracheophytes
- Clade: Angiosperms
- Clade: Eudicots
- Clade: Rosids
- Order: Sapindales
- Family: Sapindaceae
- Tribe: Cupanieae
- Genus: Diploglottis; Hook.f.

Species
- See text

= Diploglottis =

Genus of flowering plants

Diploglottis is a genus of 11 species (as of 2014) in the lychee and maple family Sapindaceae. Most species only occur in the Wet Tropics bioregion of Queensland, but all species except one are endemic to eastern Australia, with the exception being D. diphyllostegia, which also occurs in New Guinea. They are commonly called tamarinds, for example northern tamarind (D. diphyllostegia), Babinda tamarind (D. harpullioides) and Bernie's tamarind (D. bernieana), however they are not closely related to the true tamarind from the family Fabaceae.

Plants in this genus are small to large trees, often with fluted and/or multi-stemmed trunks. Branchlets are fluted, hairy and lenticellate. Leaves are compound and paripinnate; leaflets are stiff, often quite large and may be arranged in opposites or alternately. The inflorescences are panicles, produced in the leaf axils. Flowers are small, polygamous (i.e. having bisexual and unisexual flowers on the same plant), calyx with 5 lobes, corolla with 4 or 5 petals. Fruit are capsules, (1–)2–3(–4) lobed, one or more lobes may be aborted. Seeds entirely or partly enclosed in a bilobed aril.

One Australian species, D. australis is grown as a street tree in the Northern Rivers area of New South Wales, principally Lismore and is known locally as the native tamarind.

Another endemic Australian species is D. campbellii, also known as the small-leaved tamarind, is rare and threatened and is restricted to a small number of sites each with a maximum of three trees per site. There are a total of 42 known mature wild trees in south-east Queensland and north-eastern New South Wales. However, the tree, as a seedling, is readily available from nurseries in the Northern Rivers area of New South Wales, and in south-eastern Queensland. The small-leaved tamarind grows to 30 metres and has a compact canopy, making it good to use as a screening tree. It has small three-lobed fruit capsules. The fruit is edible and is commercially produced as bushfood. It is red when ripe and can be made into jam.

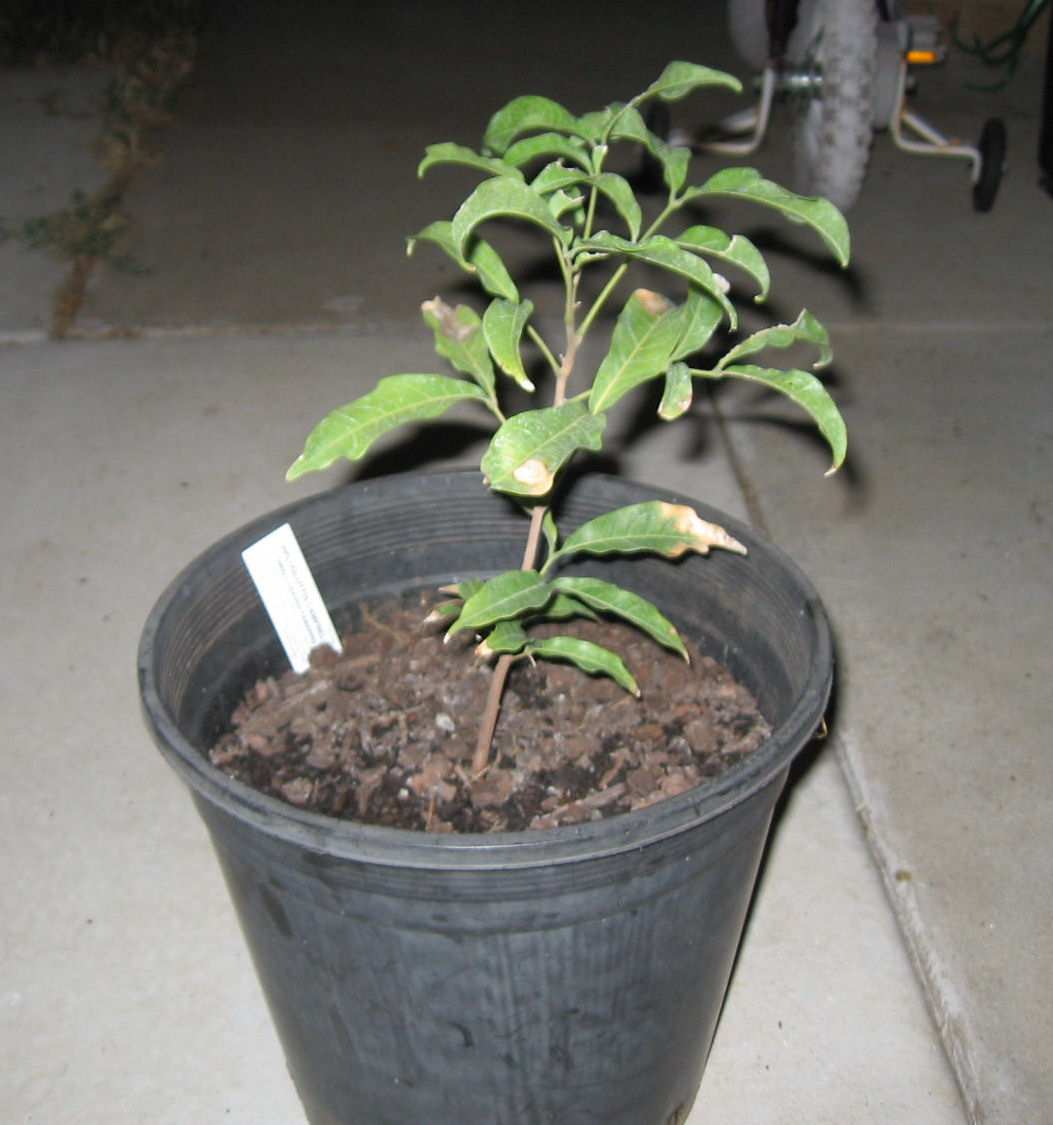
D. campbellii seedling

== Naming and classification ==
The species currently known as D. australis was the first that European scientists collected specimens of, for instance botanist Robert Brown in 1804. Before formal naming, this species was grown up to a flowering tree in a glasshouse in Kew gardens, UK. In 1862 Joseph Dalton Hooker first established this genus name Diploglottis in Genera Plantarum and the following year George Bentham formally published the D. cunninghamii name combination. Earlier in 1831 however, George Don had published a formal description of this taxon named with the epithet australis, with a different name genus. In 1878–9 Ludwig A. T. Radlkofer published his referral of this taxon to the name combination Diploglottis australis. In 1986 Gwen Harden and Lawrie Johnson published the clarification of the further involved history of these names. Sally T. Reynolds had proposed D. cunninghamii as the correct name in 1981. Harden and Johnson clarified that D. australis legitimately has support as the correct name, for this type species.

In 1978 P. W. Leenhouts described the new species D. bracteata. In 1981 and 1987 Reynolds described several different new species. In 1985 Reynolds’ account of the genus in Australia was published in the Flora of Australia volume 25. In 1994 in Flora Malesiana P. W. Leenhouts included D. australis occurring in New Guinea, however the record has been corrected to the superficially similar D. diphyllostegia which in Australia also grows in areas adjacent to New Guinea and further north than the northernmost D. australis records.

== Species ==
As of 4 February 2024, World Flora Online and Plants of the World Online both accept the following 11 species:

- D. alaticarpa W.E.Cooper - NE Qld
- D. australis (G.Don) Radlk. - SE NSW to SE Qld
- D. bernieana S.T.Reynolds - NE Qld
- D. bracteata Leenh. - NE Qld
- D. campbellii Cheel - NE NSW to SE Qld
- D. diphyllostegia (F.Muell.) F.M.Bailey - Central to NE Qld and New Guinea
- D. harpullioides S.T.Reynolds - NE Qld
- D. macrantha S.T.Reynolds - NE Qld
- D. obovata S.T.Reynolds - Central Qld
- D. pedleyi S.T.Reynolds - NE Qld
- D. smithii S.T.Reynolds - NE Qld
