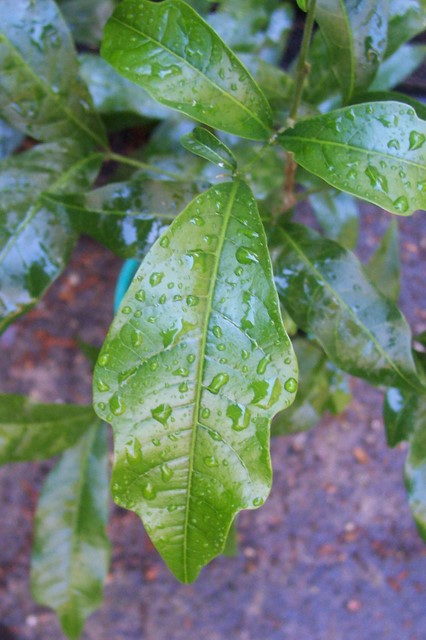
- Diploglottis campbellii juvenile leaf

Conservation status
- Endangered (EPBC Act)

Scientific classification
- Kingdom: Plantae
- Clade: Tracheophytes
- Clade: Angiosperms
- Clade: Eudicots
- Clade: Rosids
- Order: Sapindales
- Family: Sapindaceae
- Genus: Diploglottis
- Species: D. campbellii

Binomial name
- Diploglottis campbellii Cheel.

= Diploglottis campbellii =

Species of tree

Diploglottis campbellii is a rainforest tree northern New South Wales and southeastern Queensland. Growing to 30 metres tall, it is commonly known as the small-leaved tamarind. It is rare and threatened and is restricted to a small number of sites, each with a maximum of 3 trees per site. However, it is readily available from nurseries in the Northern Rivers area of New South Wales, and in south-eastern Queensland.

It has soft hairy new growth that becomes hairless with age. It has a grey brown trunk, the outer surface of live bark is green with orange to brown blotches, leaves 10–35 cm long, leaflets 4–8 cm, glossy upper surface, pale dull bottom surface

The inflorescence type is a panicle up to 15 centimetres long with small creamy brown flowers, Fruit usually 2 lobed but can be 1 or 3 lobed (each lobe holding a single seed), hairless, Red (rarely yellow) with a brown capsule, ripe Feb- April.

== Uses ==
The fruit of small-leaved tamarind is edible, and has a piquant flavour. It is used in sauces and preserves. Because the tree is very rare in the wild availability of fruit was a limitation for many years. However, increased planting of small-leaved tamarind has resulted in larger volumes of fruit becoming available for food, as well as ensuring the survival of this species.

The plant has proved adaptable in cultivation, being used in amenity horticulture and bushfood plantings. It is extensively planted in Lismore.

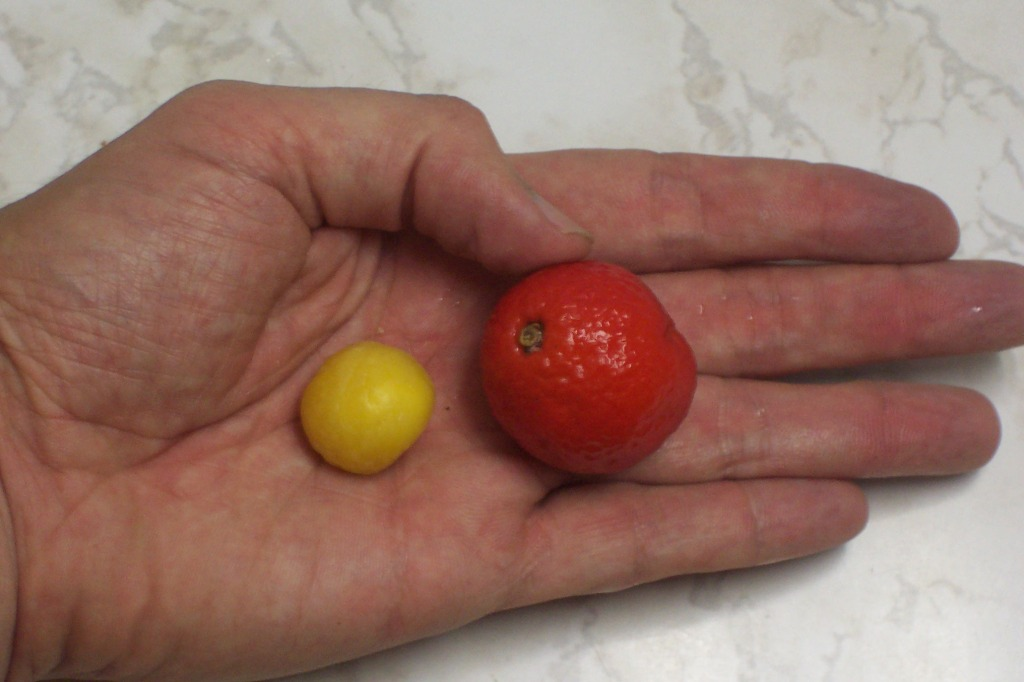
Unusual yellow fruit of Diploglottis campbellii and orange fruit of the rare Hicksbeachia pinnatifolia

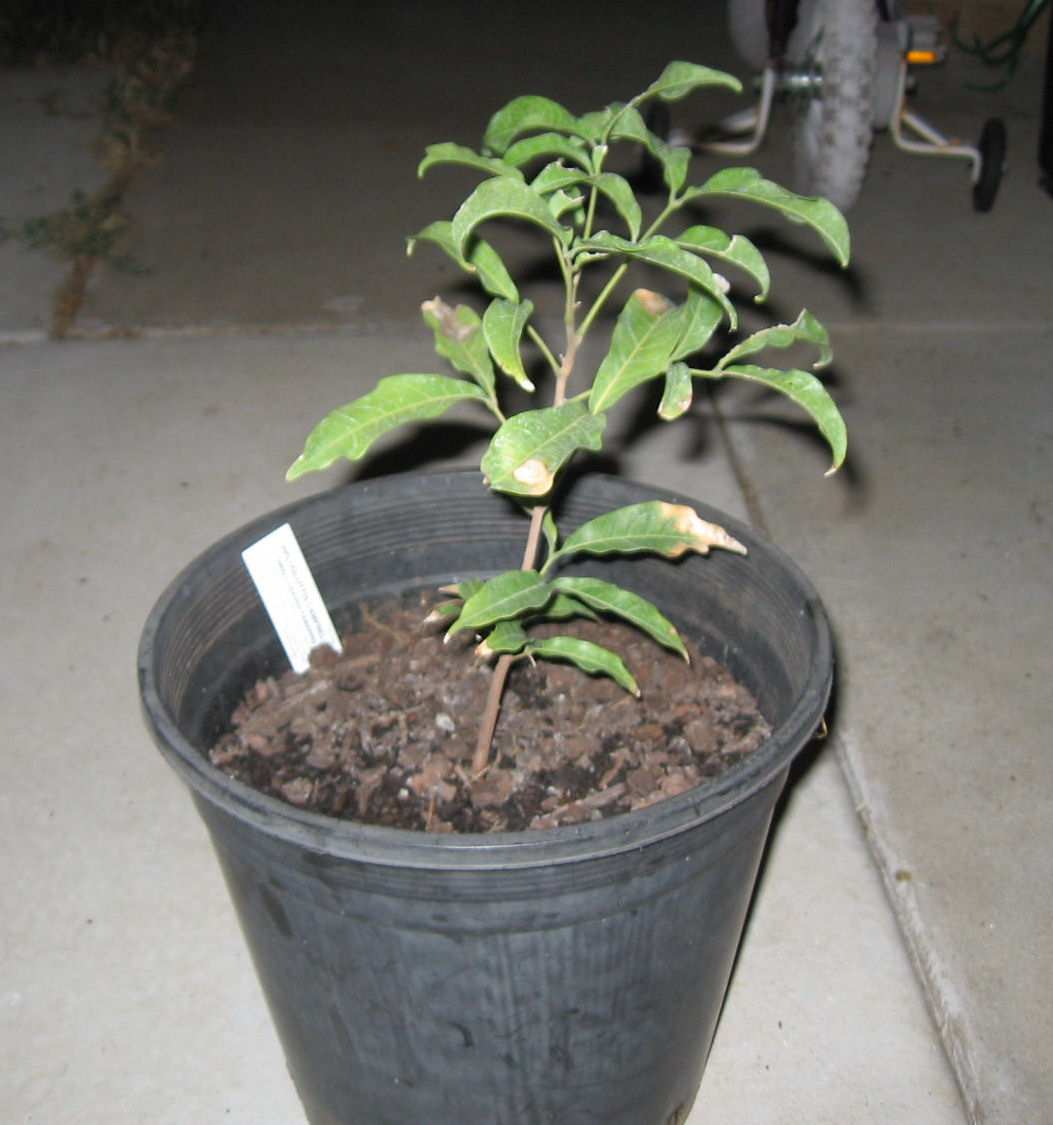
juvenile

== External sources ==
- Information obtained at Tafe Grovely Campus
- "Diploglottis campbellii" (PDF). Threatened Species Information. National Parks and Wildlife Service NSW. September 1999. Archived from the original (PDF) on 2007-09-05.
- "Diploglottis campbellii Cheel". Atlas of Living Australia.
