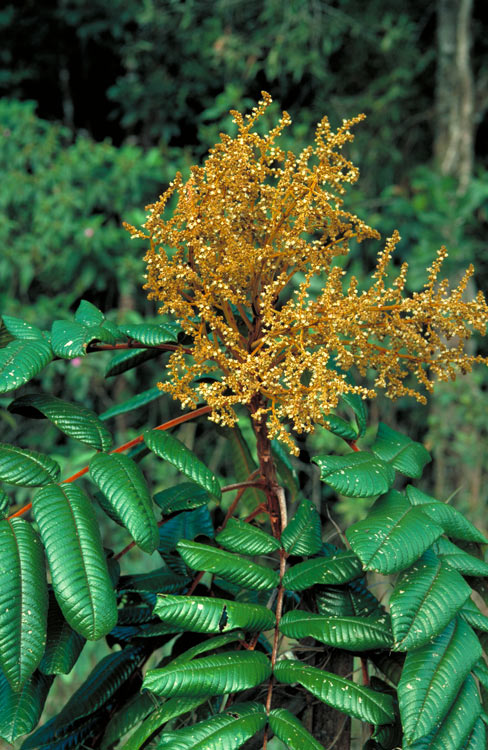
- Foliage and flowers

Conservation status
- Least Concern (NCA)

Scientific classification
- Kingdom: Plantae
- Clade: Tracheophytes
- Clade: Angiosperms
- Clade: Eudicots
- Clade: Rosids
- Order: Sapindales
- Family: Sapindaceae
- Genus: Diploglottis
- Species: D. bernieana

Binomial name
- Diploglottis bernieana S.T.Reynolds
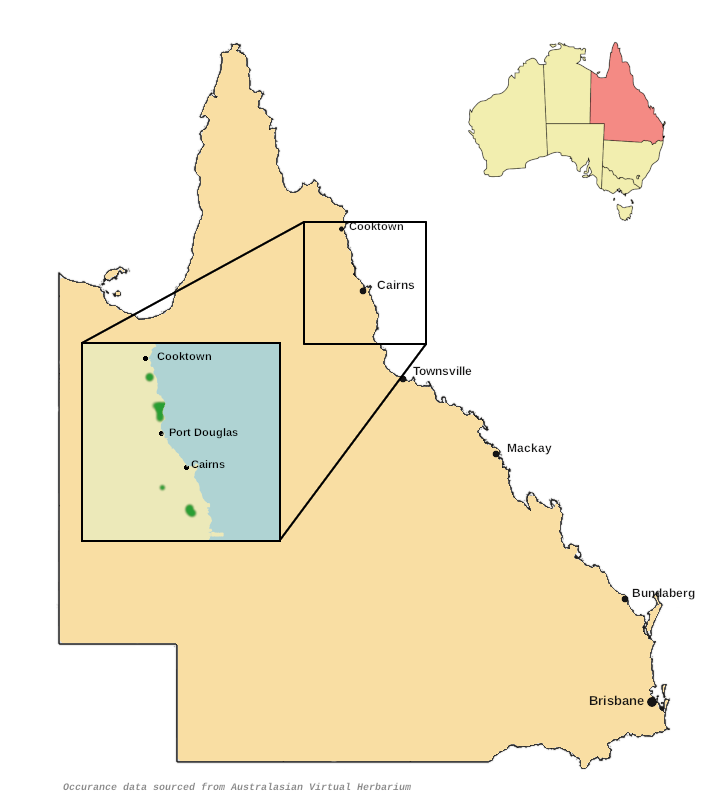

= Diploglottis bernieana =

Bernie's tamarind

Species of flowering plant

Diploglottis bernieana, commonly known as Bernie's tamarind or large leaf tamarind, is a plant in the maple and lychee family Sapindaceae. It was first described in 1987 by the Australian botanist Sally T. Reynolds and is found only the Wet Tropics region of northeastern Queensland, Australia.

== Description ==
Diploglottis bernieana is a medium-sized tree growing to about 20 m (66 ft) tall and 20 cm (7.9 in) circumference, with a fluted trunk and buttress roots. New growth is covered in a fine brown indumentum. The compound leaves may reach up to 82 cm (32 in) in length (including the petiole which may itself be 20 cm or 7.9 in long) and has 4 or 5 pairs of leaflets. The coriaceous (stiff, leathery) leaflets are generally oblong in shape with both ends truncate, and they are quite large, measuring up to 35 cm (14 in) long by 20 cm (7.9 in) wide. They are mostly glabrous but pubescent along the midrib, with 18 to 25 pairs of lateral veins, bullate between the veins, shiny.

The inflorescence is a panicle produced in the leaf axils measuring up to 50 cm (20 in) long and 30 cm (12 in) wide. The individual flowers are about 8 mm (0.31 in) wide and held on pedicels about 5 mm (0.20 in) long. The calyx is 5-lobed, green, and densely covered in red-brown hairs; the 5 white petals are about 5 mm (0.20 in) long with one petal slightly smaller than the rest. There are 8 stamens about 6 mm (0.24 in) long, the style is about 3 mm (0.12 in) long.

The fruit is a yellow-brown capsule with thick fleshy walls and 1 to 3 segments known as valves, one of which is usually aborted. It is densely rusty pubescent on the outside and has long soft hairs on the internal surfaces. Seeds number 1 per mature valve, are about 13 mm (0.51 in) long by 22 mm (0.87 in) wide, and are enclosed in an orange aril.

=== Phenology ===
Flowering occurs from September to November, and fruit ripen between November and December.

== Taxonomy ==
This plant was first recognised as a distinct species by Bernard Hyland, but it was first formally described by Sally T. Reynolds. Her paper, titled "Notes on Sapindaceae, V" (the fifth in a series of papers she wrote about the family), was published in the Queensland Herbarium's journal Austrobaileya in 1987.

=== Etymology ===
The genus name Diploglottis comes from the Neo-Latin words diplo- meaning double, and glottis meaning tongue, which is a reference to the two tongue-like scales on the petals. The species epithet bernieana was chosen by Reynolds to honour the highly respected Queensland botanist Bernard Hyland, who first recognised this as an undescribed species. In Reynolds' protologue, the species epithet was misspelled as berniana, this was corrected in a later corrigendum.

== Distribution and habitat ==
The natural range of Bernie's tamarind is from about Rossville, near Cooktown, south to Innisfail, including the Atherton Tableland southwest of Cairns. It grows in well developed rainforest, from sea level to 600 m (2,000 ft) altitude.

== Conservation ==
This species is listed by Queensland's Department of Environment and Science as least concern. As of 29 January 2024, it has not been assessed by the International Union for Conservation of Nature (IUCN).

== Gallery ==
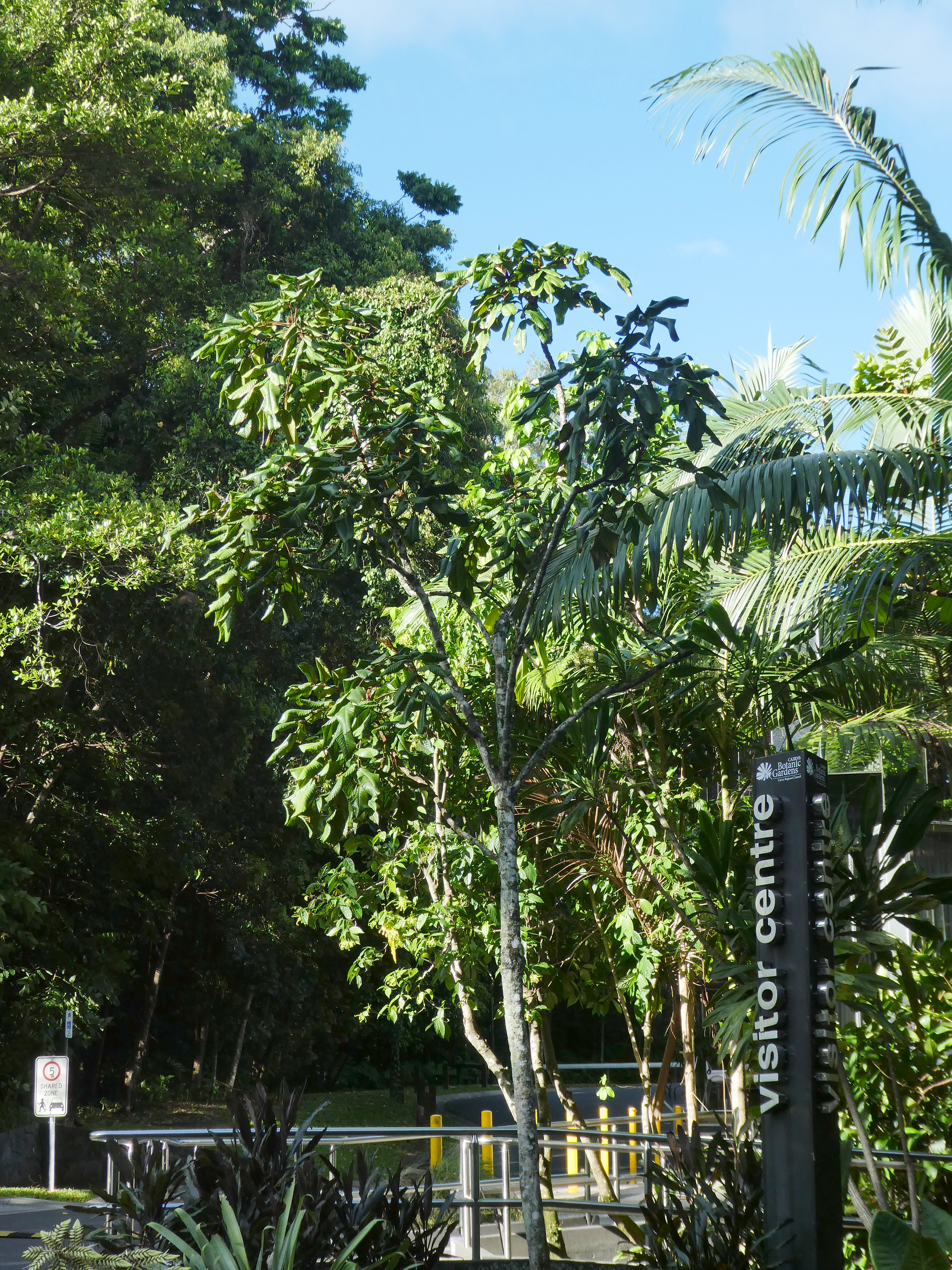
Young tree

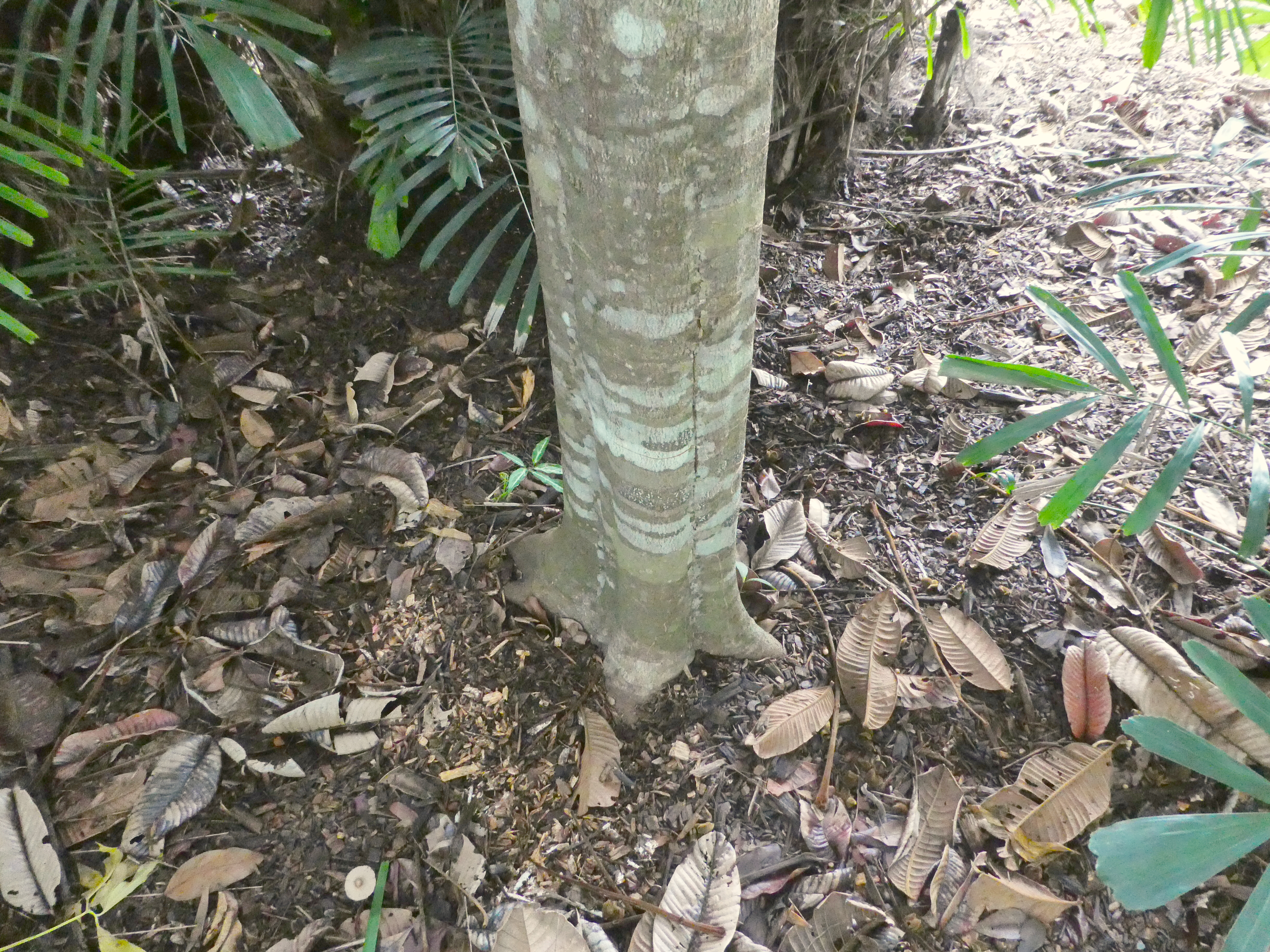
Fluted trunk

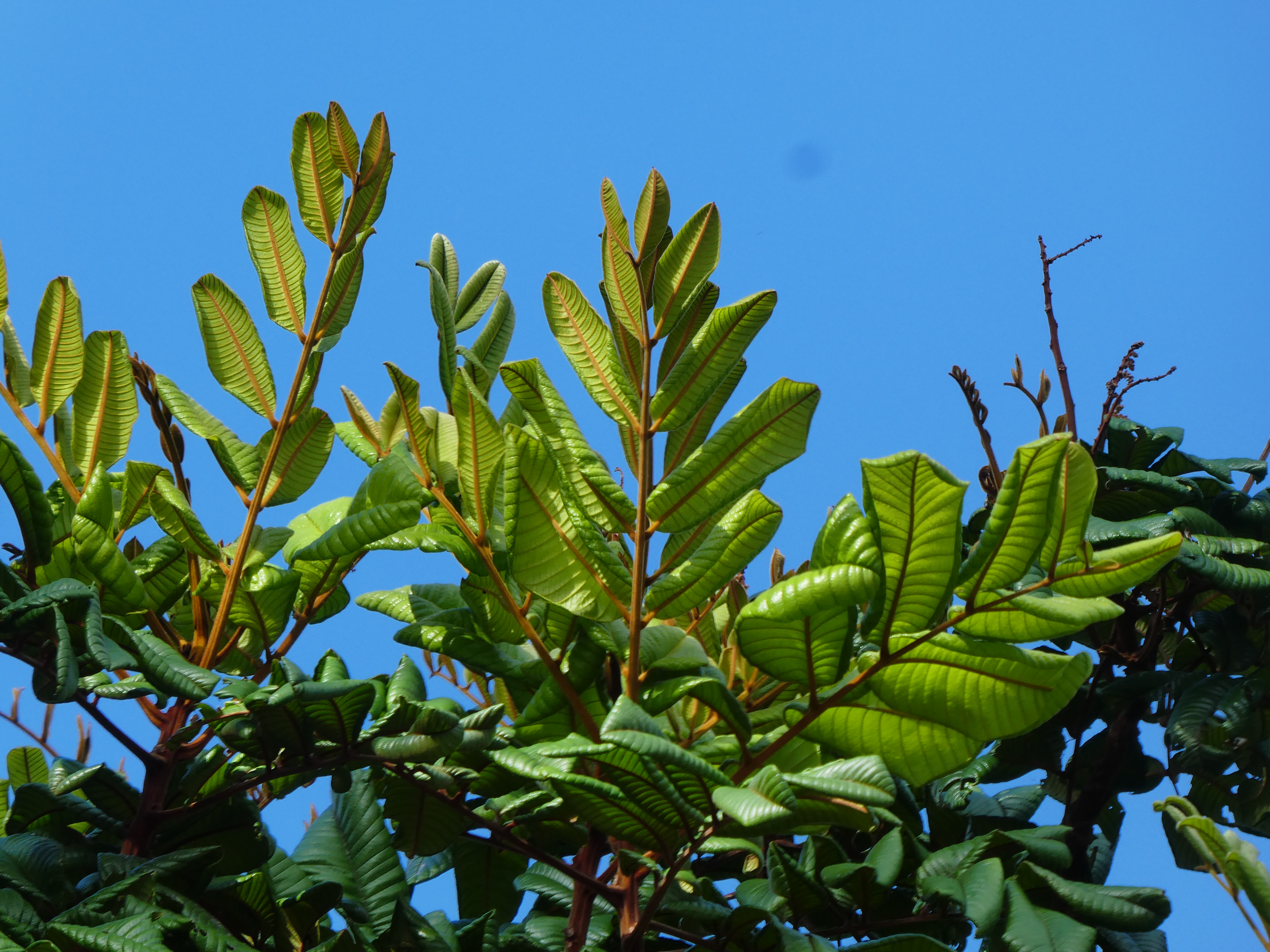
Foliage

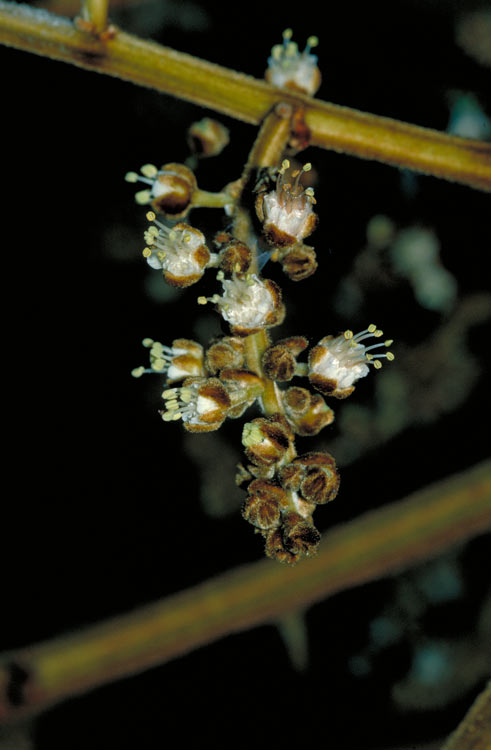
Flowers

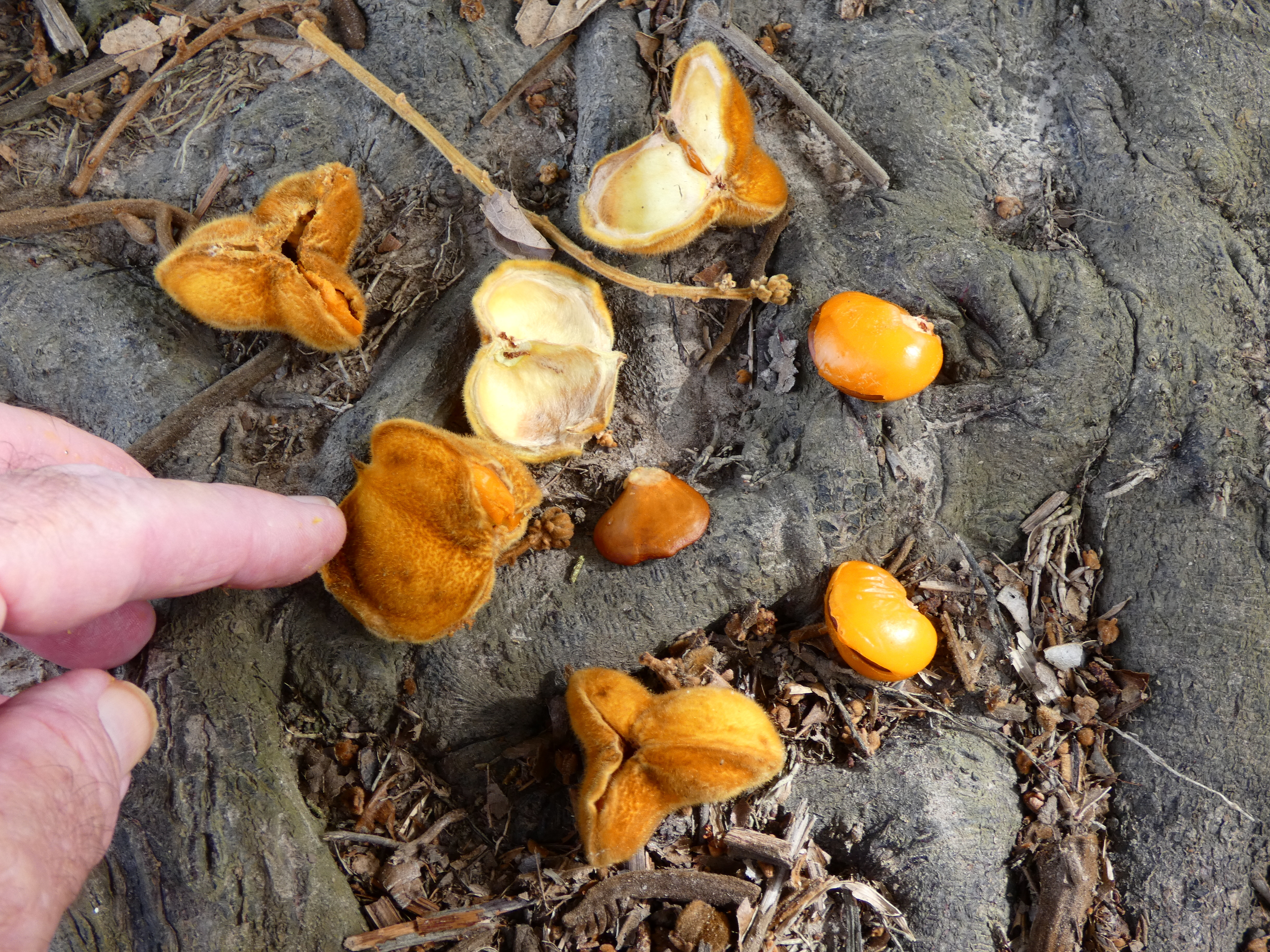
Fruits and seeds
