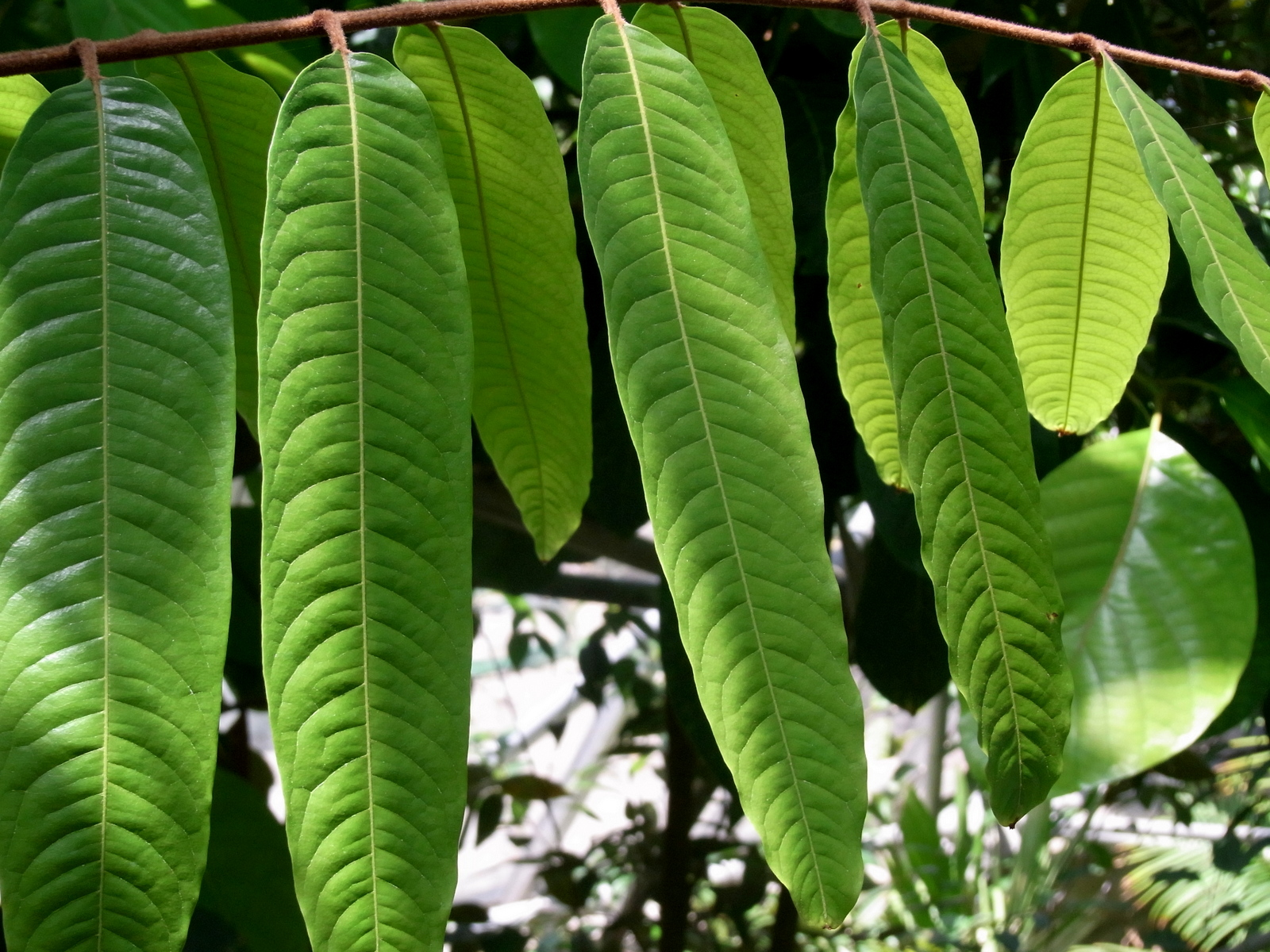
- Royal Botanic Gardens Sydney

Scientific classification
- Kingdom: Plantae
- Clade: Tracheophytes
- Clade: Angiosperms
- Clade: Eudicots
- Clade: Rosids
- Order: Sapindales
- Family: Sapindaceae
- Genus: Diploglottis
- Species: D. pedleyi

Binomial name
- Diploglottis pedleyi S.T.Reynolds

= Diploglottis pedleyi =

Species of flowering plant

Diploglottis pedleyi is a shrub or small tree, found in tropical Queensland. Usually seen as an understorey plant in well developed rainforest, growing from one to six metres tall. The type specimen is from The Boulders near Babinda in the wet tropics.
