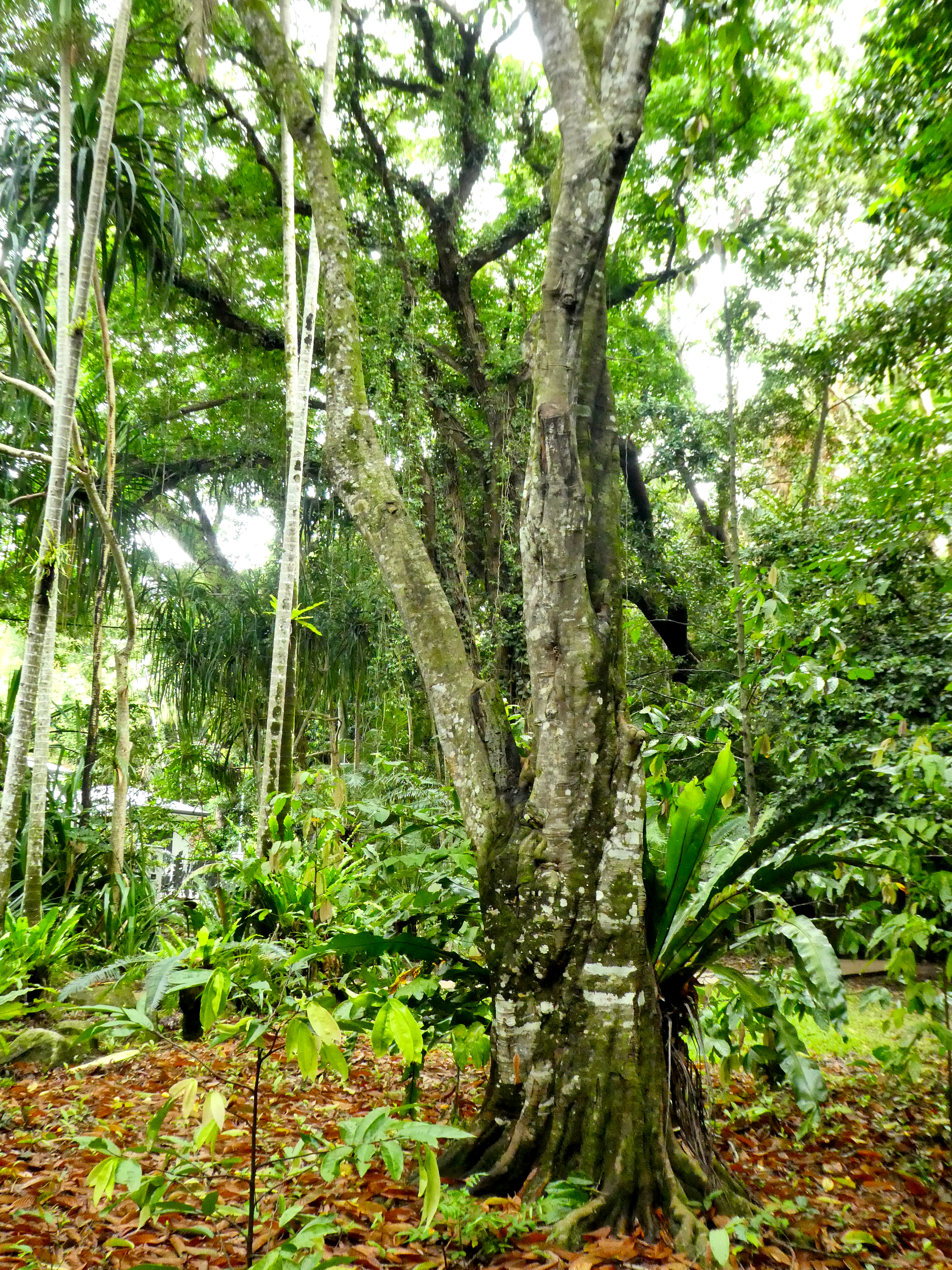
- In Cairns Botanic Gardens

Conservation status
- Least Concern (NCA)

Scientific classification
- Kingdom: Plantae
- Clade: Tracheophytes
- Clade: Angiosperms
- Clade: Eudicots
- Clade: Rosids
- Order: Sapindales
- Family: Sapindaceae
- Genus: Diploglottis
- Species: D. smithii

Binomial name
- Diploglottis smithii S.T.Reynolds

= Diploglottis smithii =

Smith's tamarind

Species of flowering plant

Diploglottis smithii, commonly known as Smith's tamarind or wild tamarind, is a plant in the maple family Sapindaceae found only in the Wet Tropics bioregion of Queensland, Australia.

== Description ==
It is a tree up to 18 m tall and 60 cm trunk diameter, and it may produce buttress roots. The large compound leaves can reach 47 cm in length (including the petiole), with between 4 and 6 pairs of leaflets. The leaflets have 24–34 lateral veins set about 7 mm apart, which are depressed in the upper surface (i.e. they are bullate). The inflorescence is a thyrse with numerous small flowers about 5 mm diameter. The fruits are yellowy-green, 2- or 3-valved capsules about 1.8 cm long and 3 cm wide, each valve containing a single brown seed entirely enclosed in an orange aril.

== Taxonomy ==
This species was first described by the Australian botanist and Sapindaceae specialist Sally T. Reynolds, and published in the journal Austrobaileya in 1981.

=== Etymology ===
The genus name Diploglottis comes from the Neo-Latin words diplo- meaning double, and glottis meaning tongue, which is a reference to the two tongue-like scales on the petals. The species epithet smithii was chosen to honour the botanist Lindsay Stuart Smith who collected the type specimen in 1948, and was an authority on Sapindaceae in Australia.

== Distribution and habitat ==
Smith's tamarind is restricted to coastal rainforest in northeast Queensland from about Cooktown to just south of Innisfail, at altitudes from sea level to 450 m.

== Conservation ==
This species is listed as least concern under the Queensland Government's Nature Conservation Act. As of 12 June 2024, it has not been assessed by the International Union for Conservation of Nature (IUCN).

== Gallery ==
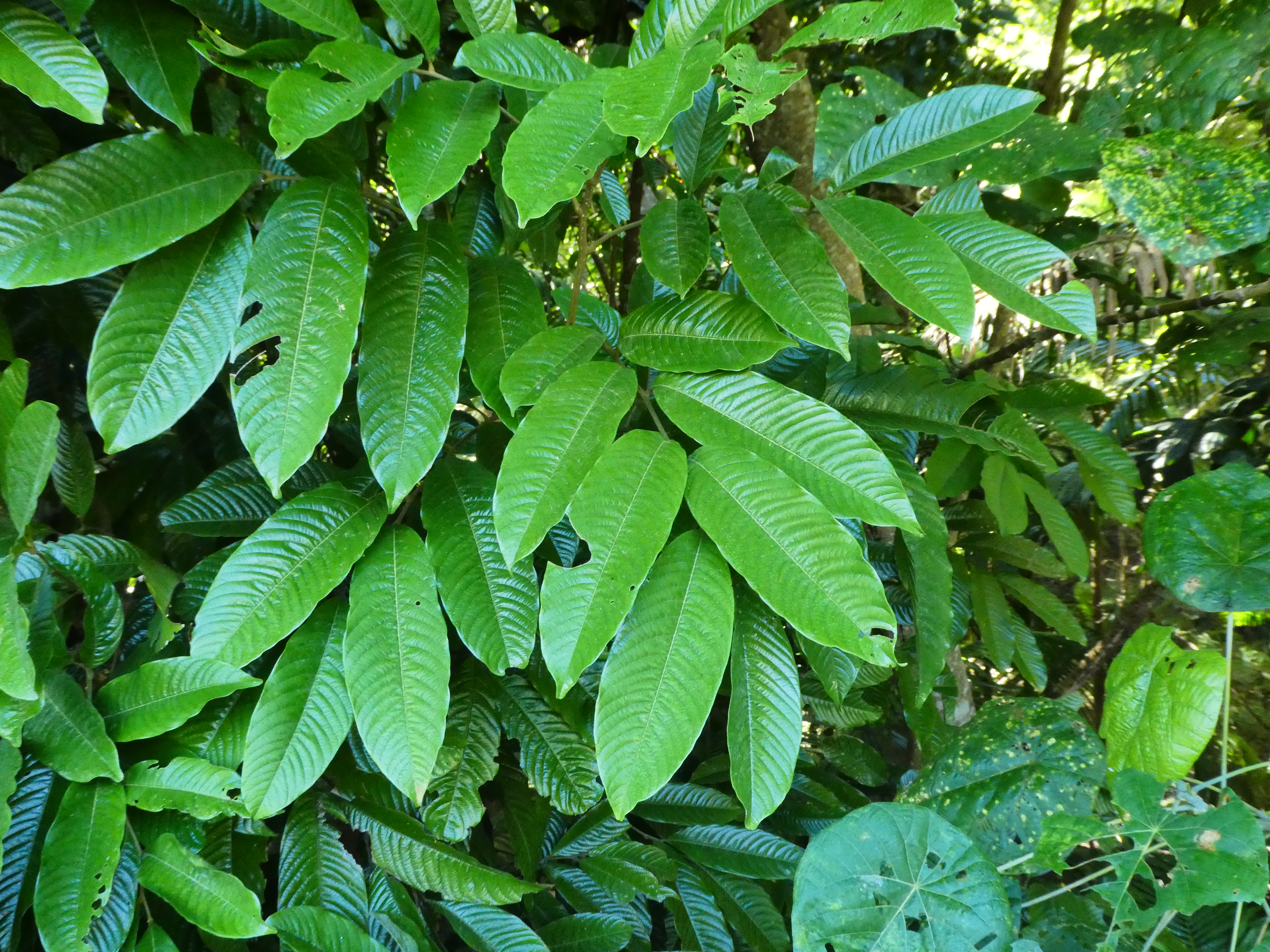
Foliage

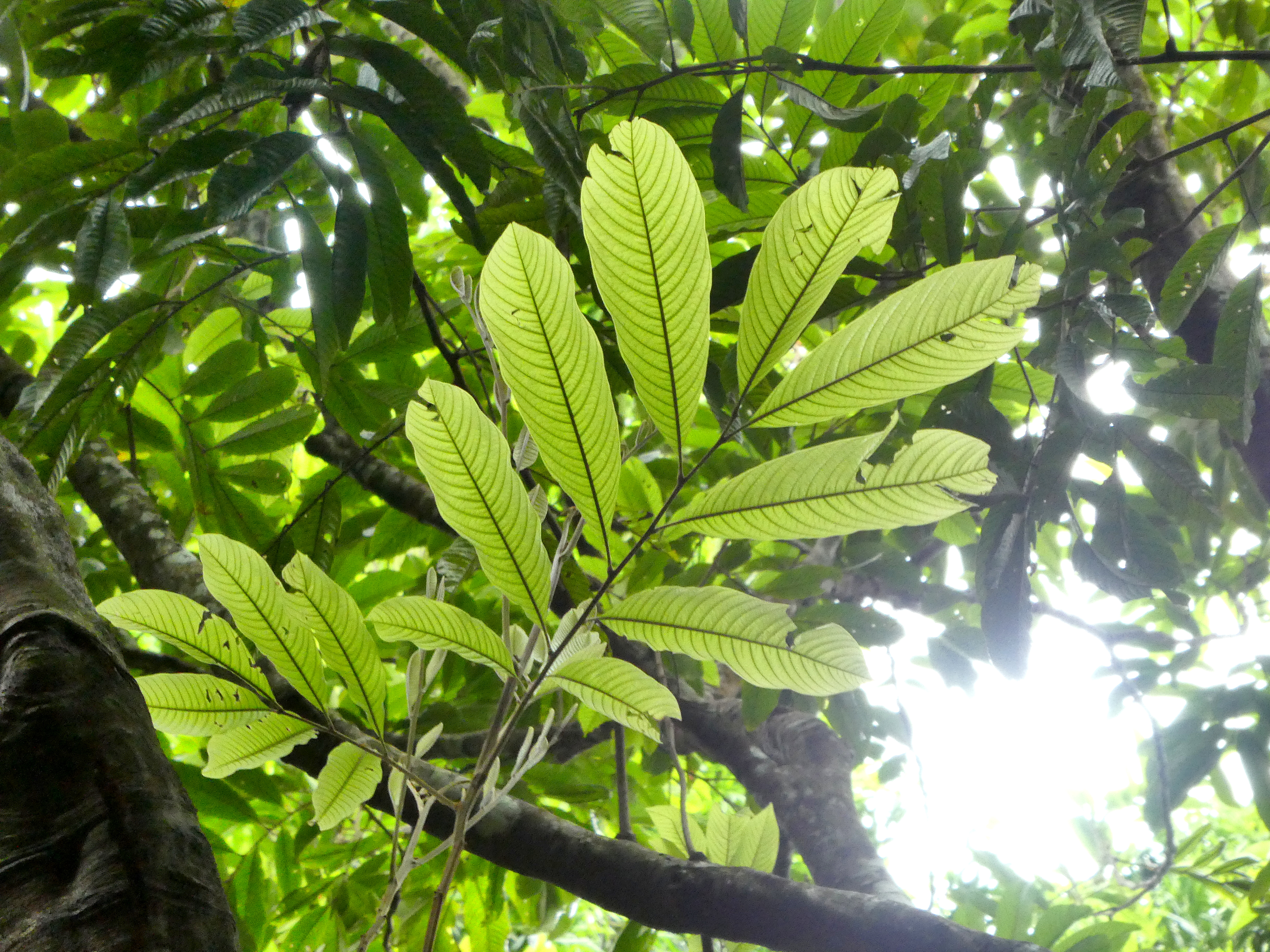
The compound leaf

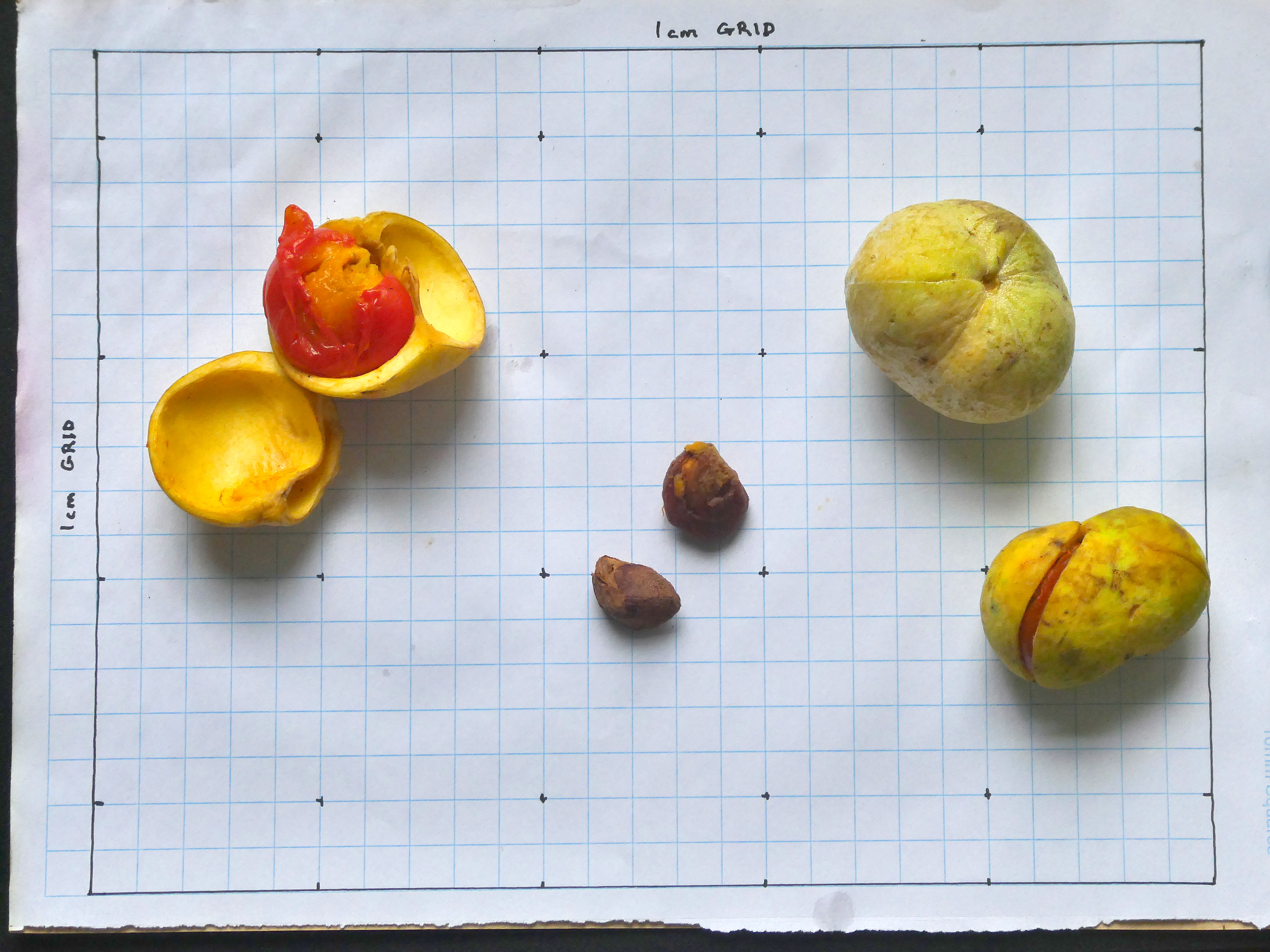
Fruits and seeds

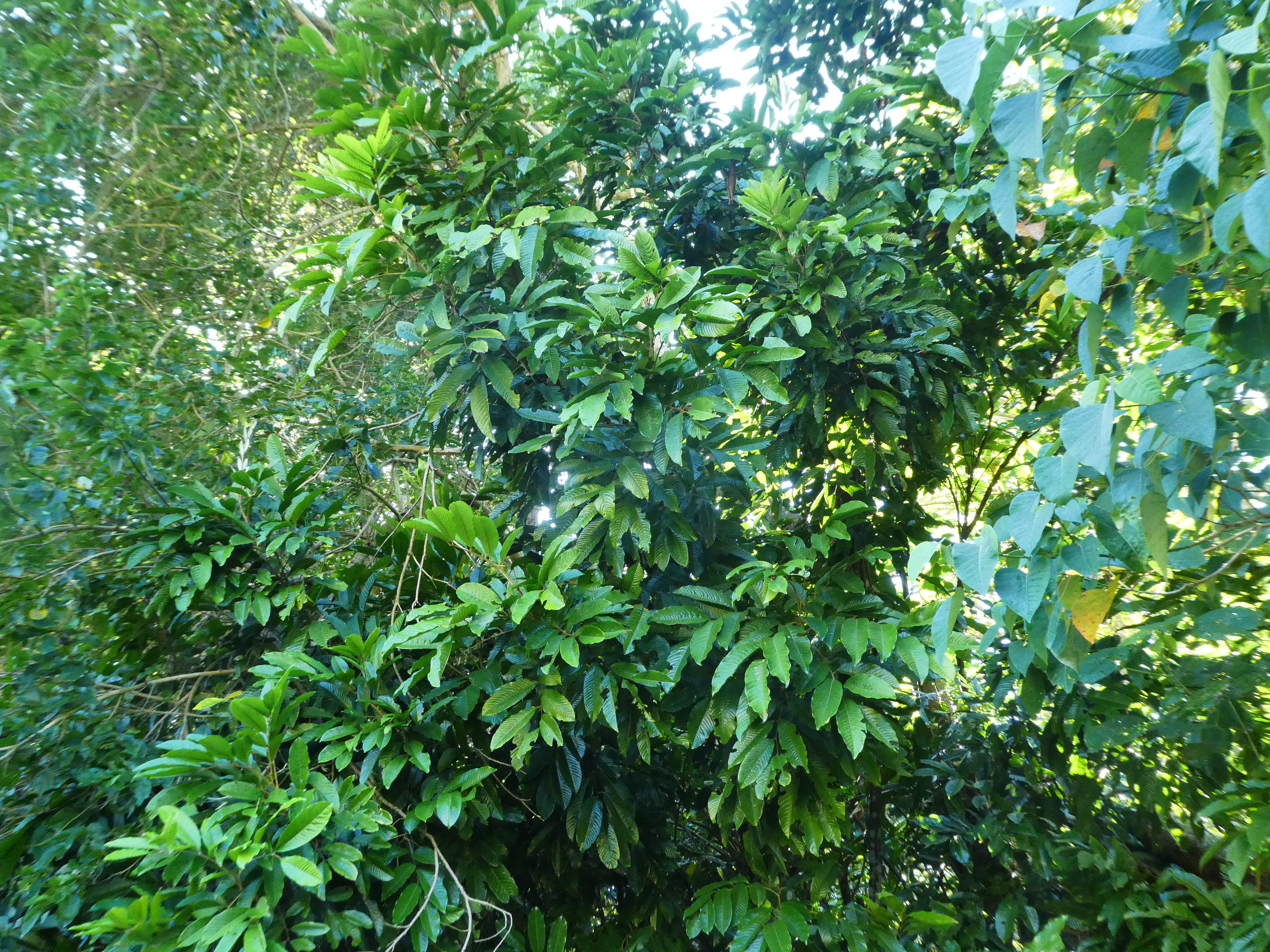
A tree in rainforest near Cairns, Queensland
