= Diploglottis macrantha =

Conservation status
- Least Concern (IUCN 3.1)

Scientific classification
- Kingdom: Plantae
- Clade: Tracheophytes
- Clade: Angiosperms
- Clade: Eudicots
- Clade: Rosids
- Order: Sapindales
- Family: Sapindaceae
- Genus: Diploglottis
- Species: D. macrantha

Binomial name
- Diploglottis macrantha S.T.Reynolds

Species of flowering plant

Diploglottis macrantha, commonly known as Cape tamarind, is a plant in the lychee family Sapindaceae endemic to Queensland, Australia. It is a shrub or small tree reaching up to 5 m (16 ft) tall which inhabits rainforest, monsoon forest and gallery forest on Cape York Peninsula. It was first described` by the Australian botanist Sally T. Reynolds in 1981. The common name refers to its native region of Cape York.

== Conservation ==
As of October 2024, this species has been assessed to be of least concern by the International Union for Conservation of Nature (IUCN) and by the Queensland Government under its Nature Conservation Act.

== Gallery ==
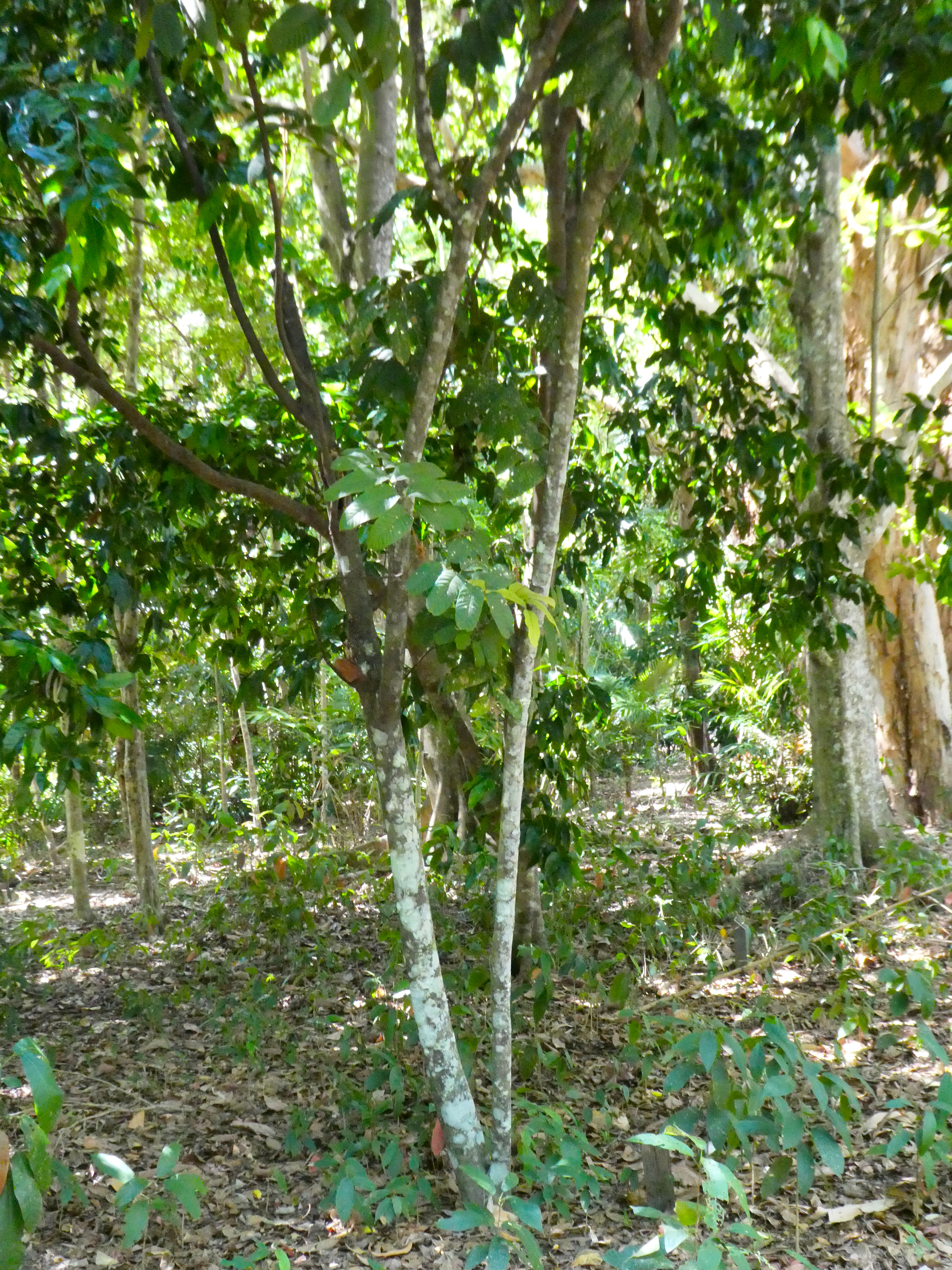
Habit

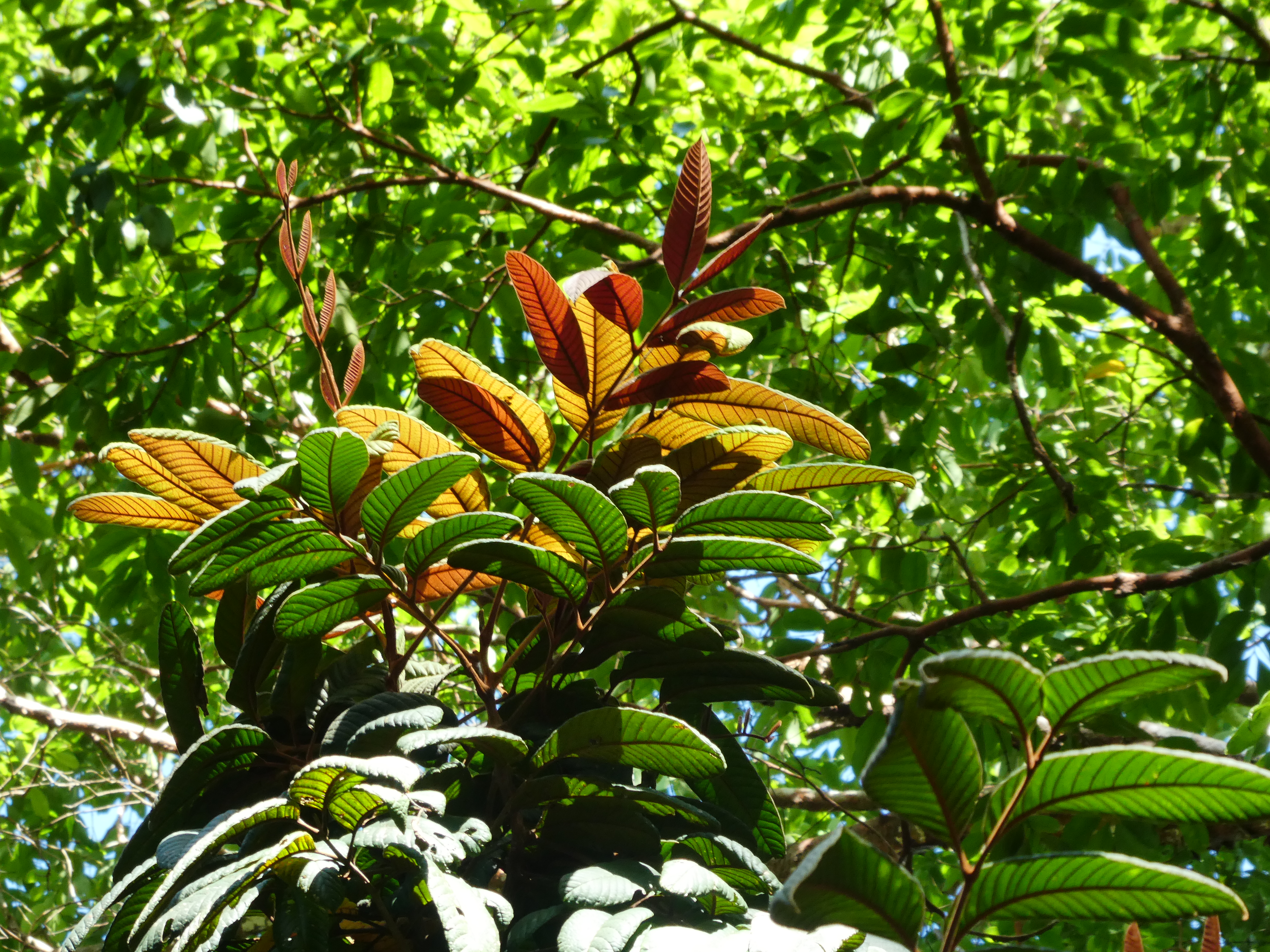
Colourful new growth

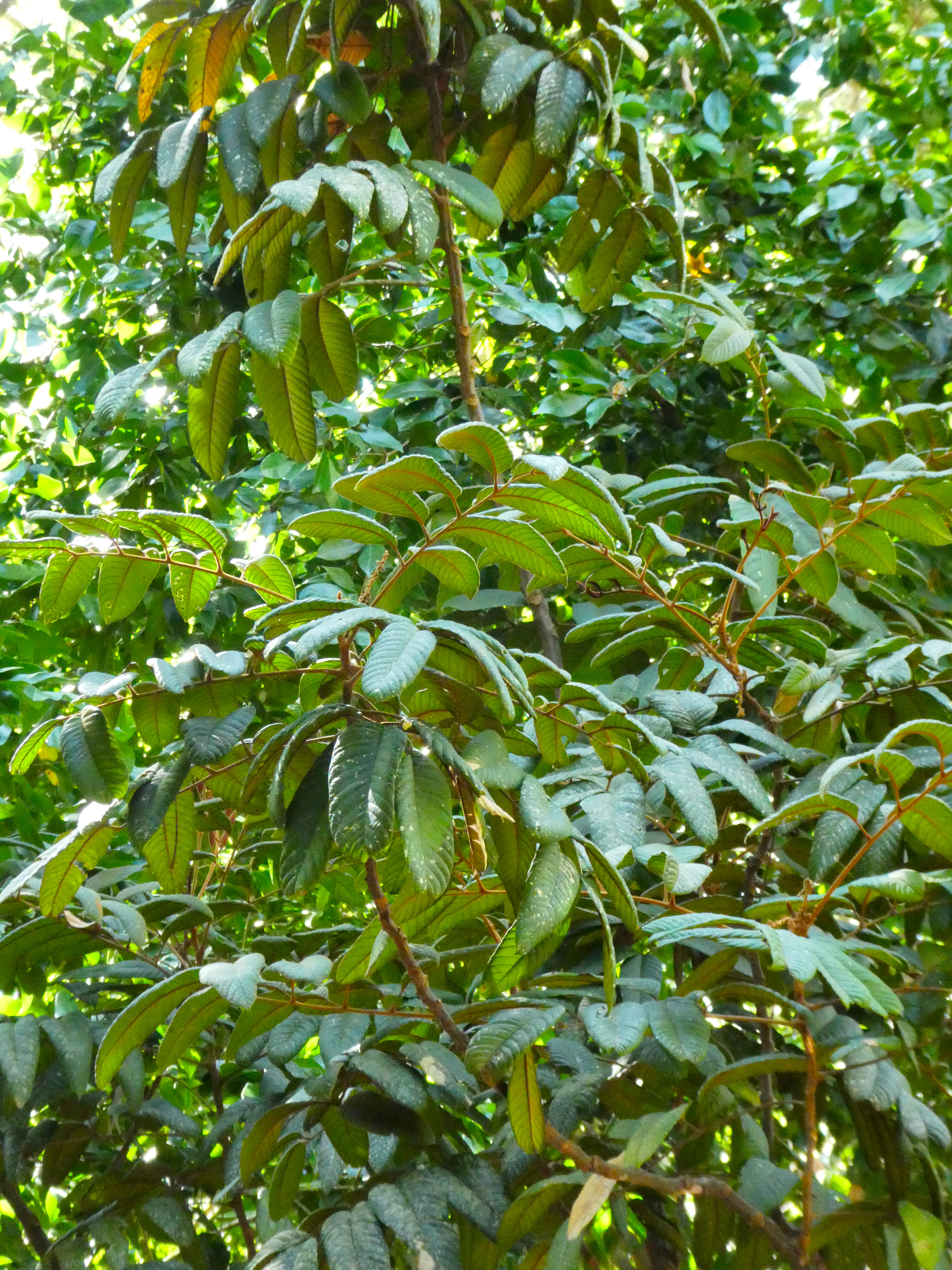
Foliage
