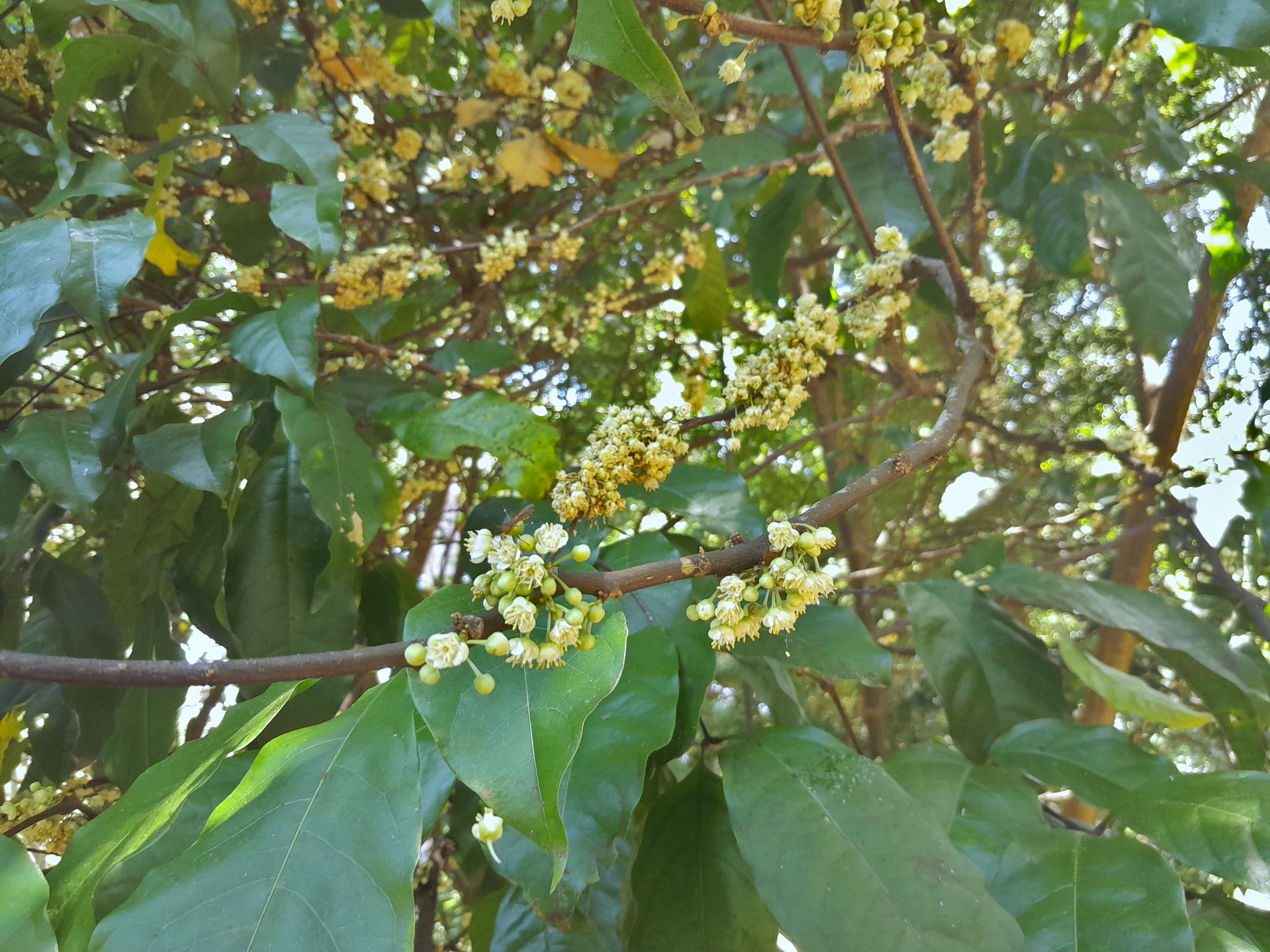

Conservation status
- Near Threatened (NCA)

Scientific classification
- Kingdom: Plantae
- Clade: Tracheophytes
- Clade: Angiosperms
- Clade: Eudicots
- Clade: Rosids
- Order: Sapindales
- Family: Sapindaceae
- Genus: Diploglottis
- Species: D. harpullioides

Binomial name
- Diploglottis harpullioides S.T.Reynolds

= Diploglottis harpullioides =

Babinda tamarind

Species of flowering plant

Diploglottis harpullioides, commonly known as Babinda tamarind, is a rainforest tree in the lychee and maple family Sapindaceae which is found only in northeast Queensland, Australia.

== Description ==
Diploglottis harpullioides is a shrub or small tree growing up to 5 m (16 ft) tall. The compound leaves may reach 58 cm (23 in) in length (including the petiole), and have between 4 and 8 stiff, hairless leaflets arranged in opposite pairs. Each pair is larger than the previous pair closer to the junction with the branch. Leaflets are elliptic-oblong with accuminate tips and very oblique bases, and measure up to 32 cm (13 in) long by 11 cm (4.3 in) wide. They have between 9 and 14 lateral veins each side of the midrib which curve inside the leaf margin and connect to adjacent veins.

The inflorescences are very small compared to other members of Diploglottis, being just 2.5 cm (0.98 in) long. They are panicles growing from the leaf axils, carrying flowers about 5 mm (0.20 in) wide on pedicels up to 7 mm (0.28 in) long. The sepals are pale green, and the 5 white petals measure up to 5.5 mm (0.22 in) long.

The fruit is a large, green, hairless or sparsely hairy capsule measuring up to 4 cm (1.6 in) long by 6 cm (2.4 in) wide with walls about 4 mm (0.16 in) thick. They have 1–4 valves which split open to release the seeds. The valves are silky hairy on the inside and have 1 brown seed which is completely enclosed in a red aril. Usually 2 valves are aborted and don't mature, appearing as small lumps on the base of the fruit.

== Taxonomy ==
The Babinda tamarind was first described by the Australian botanist Sally T. Reynolds in the first of a series of papers on the Sapindaceae species in Australia. This paper, titled "Notes on Sapindaceae in Australia, I" was published in 1981 in Austrobaileya, the official journal of the Queensland Herbarium.

=== Etymology ===
The genus name Diploglottis comes from the Neo-Latin words diplo- meaning double, and glottis meaning tongue, which is a reference to the two tongue-like scales on the petals. The species epithet harpullioides is a reference to this plant's similarity to the genus Harpullia.

== Distribution and habitat ==
This species is endemic to northeastern Queensland, and occurs in coastal flats and adjacent ranges from near Rossville and Cedar Bay in the Ngalba Bulal National Park, south to about Innisfail, and from sea level to about 400 m (1,300 ft). It is an understorey tree in well developed rainforest.

== Conservation ==
The Babinda tamarind is listed by the Queensland Government's Department of Environment, Science and Innovation as least concern. As of 4 February 2024, it has not been assessed by the International Union for Conservation of Nature (IUCN).

== Gallery ==
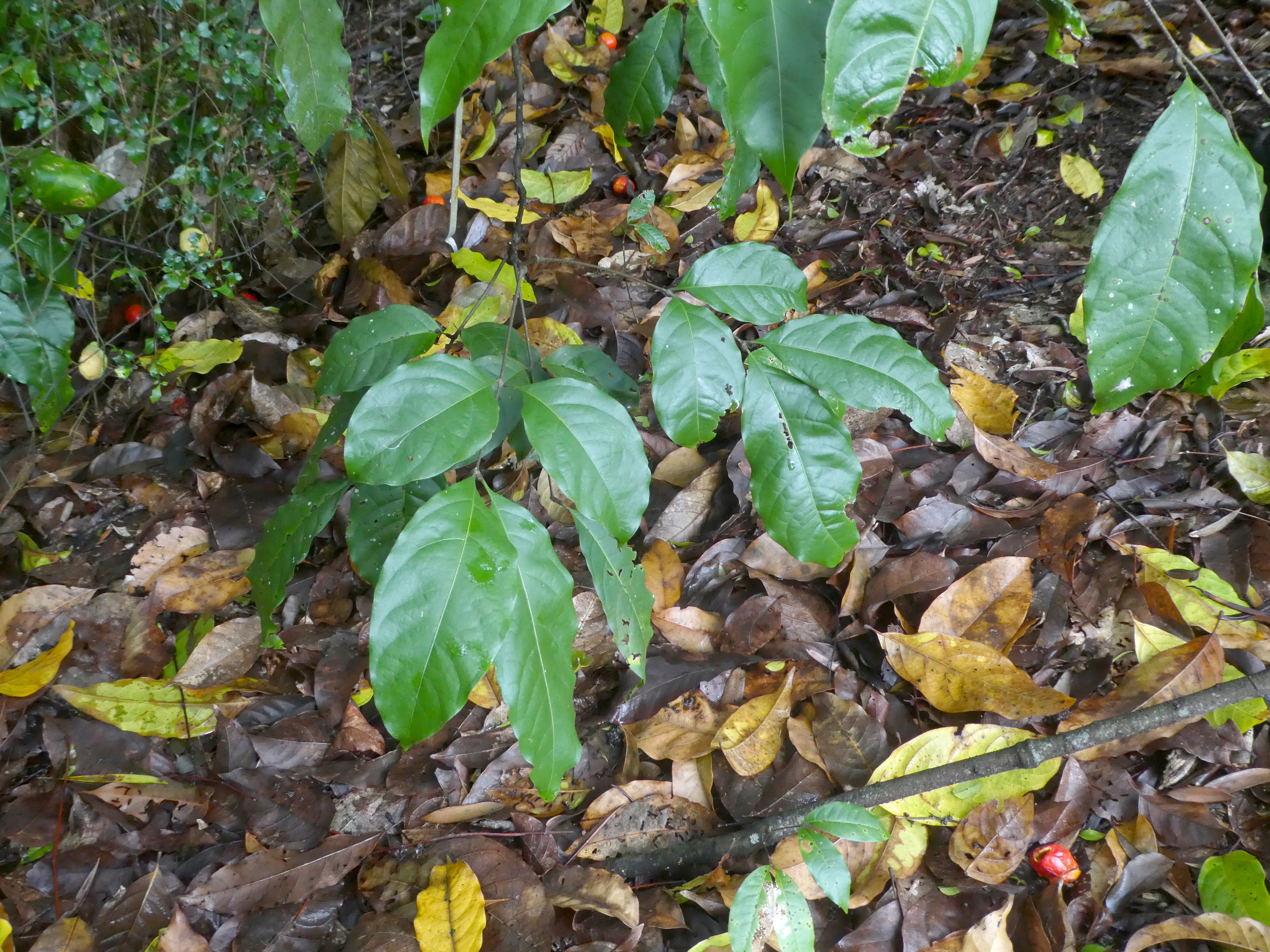
Foliage

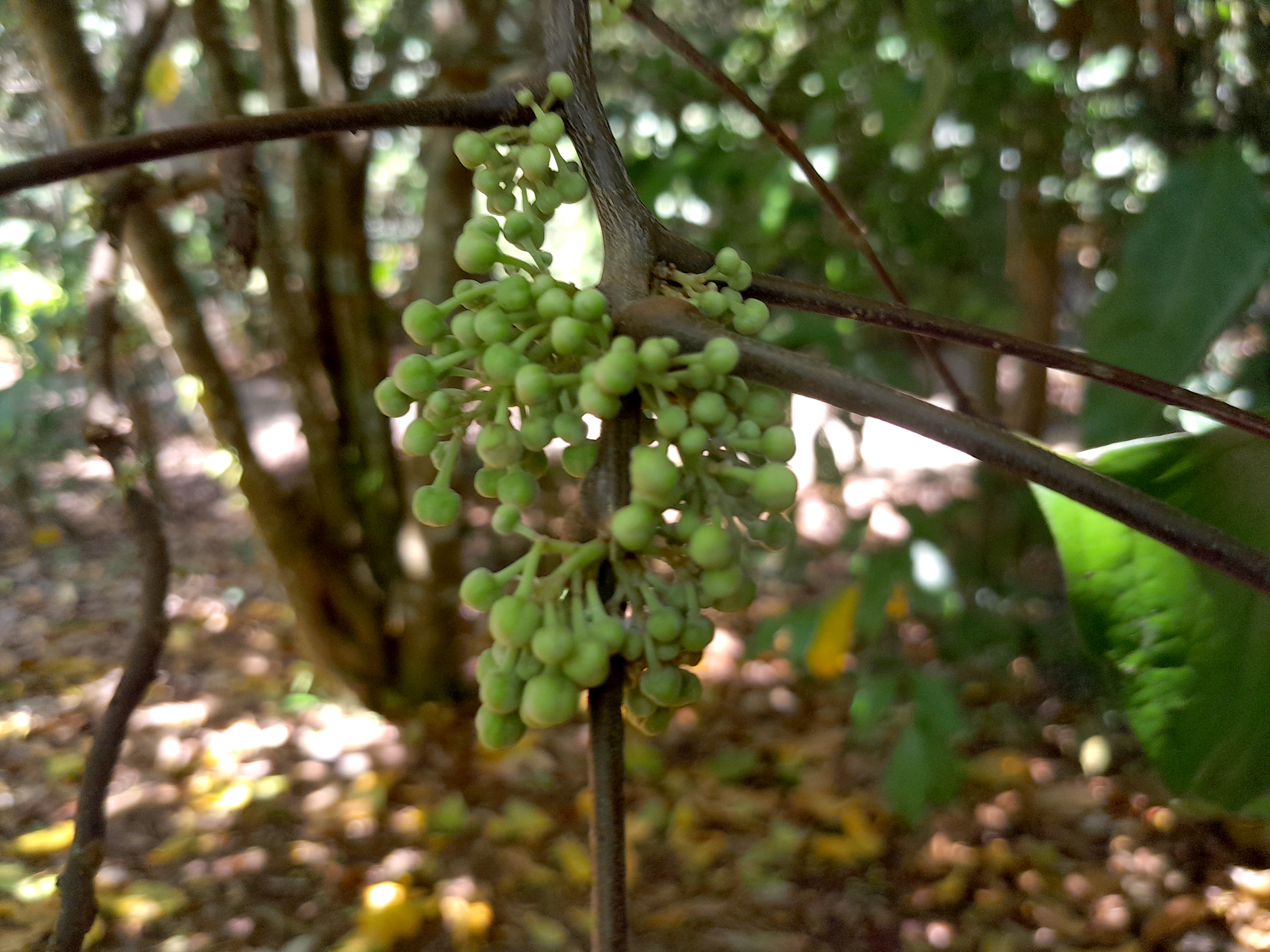
Flower buds

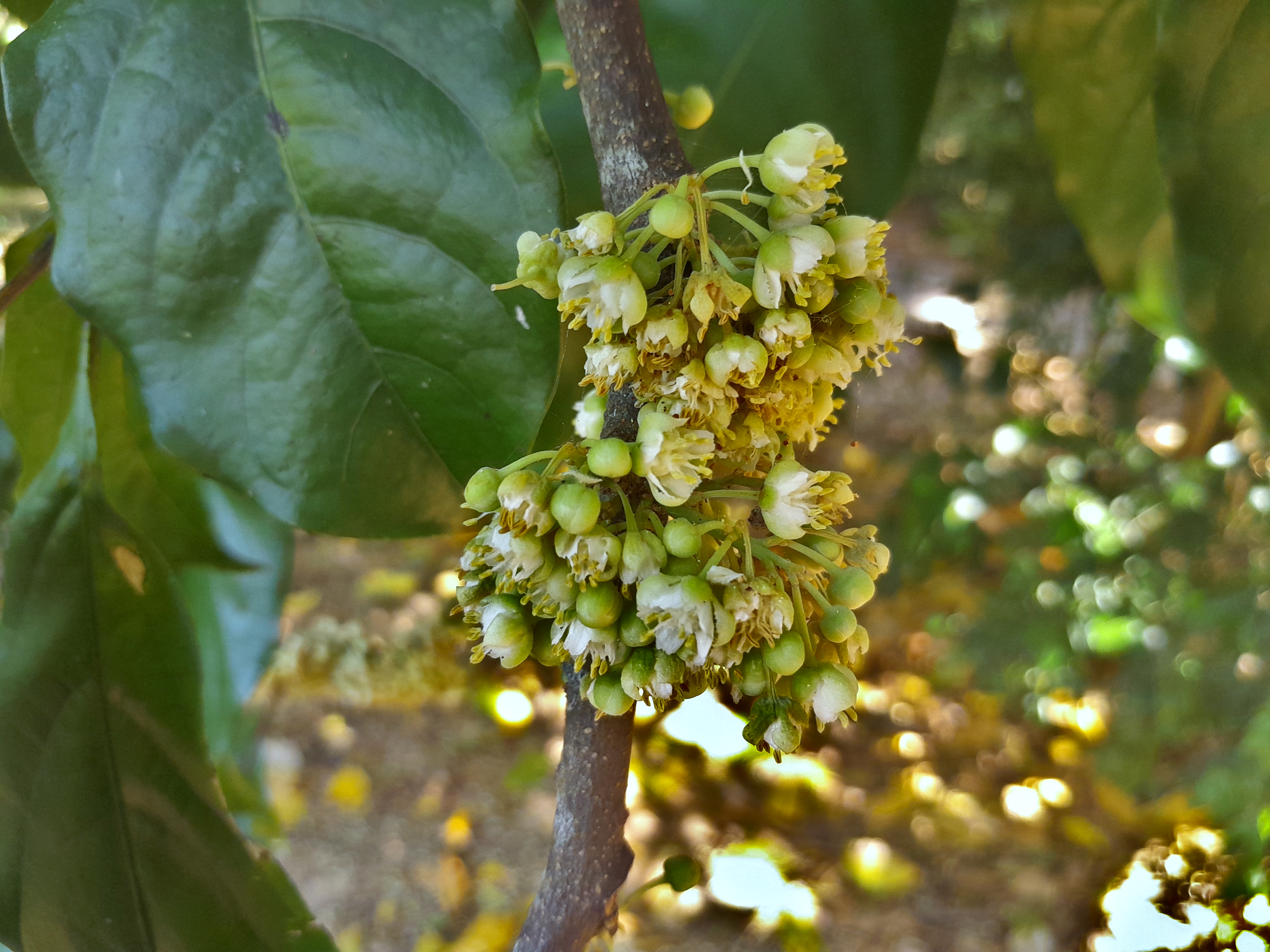
Flowers

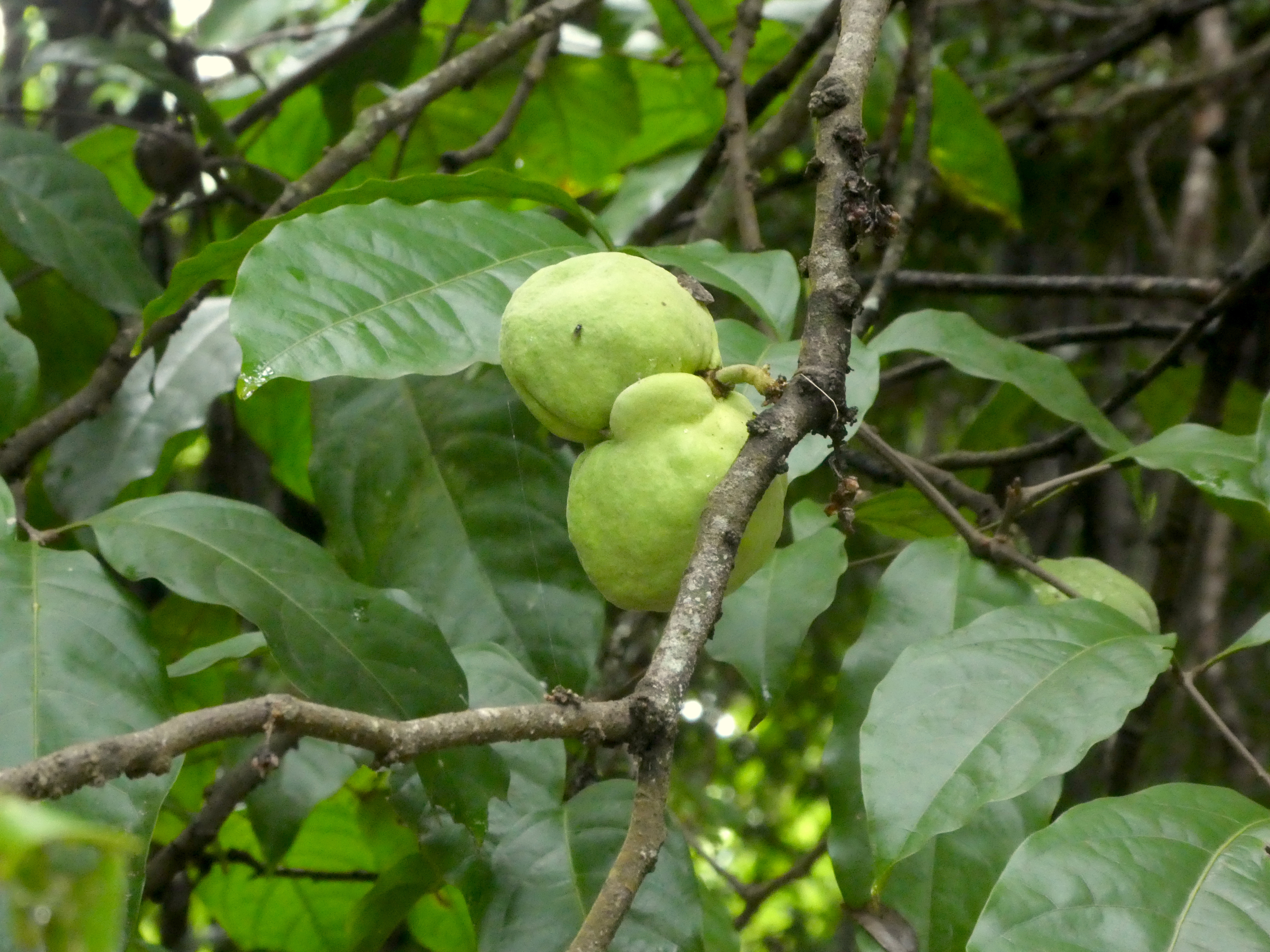
Two fruits, one with an
aborted valve

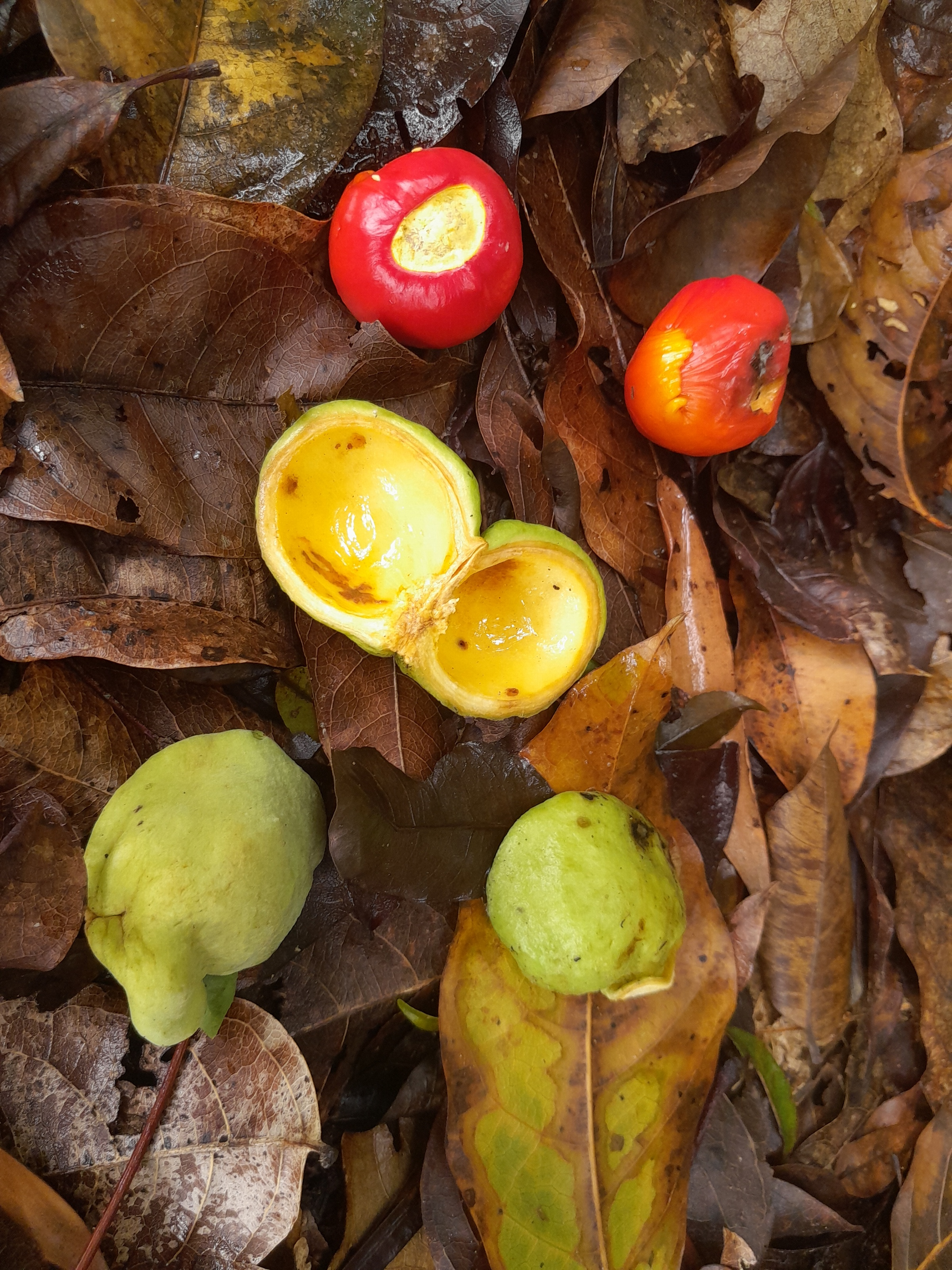
Dehisced fruit and seeds
