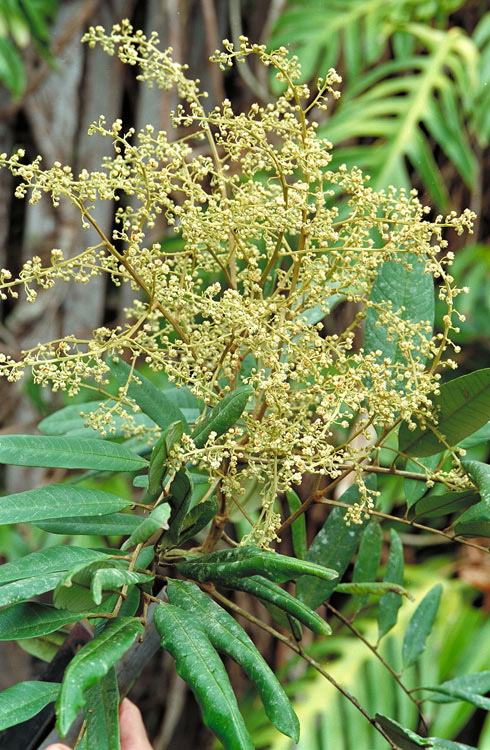
- Flowers

Conservation status
- Least Concern (IUCN 3.1)

Scientific classification
- Kingdom: Plantae
- Clade: Tracheophytes
- Clade: Angiosperms
- Clade: Eudicots
- Clade: Rosids
- Order: Sapindales
- Family: Sapindaceae
- Genus: Diploglottis
- Species: D. bracteata

Binomial name
- Diploglottis bracteata Leenh.

= Diploglottis bracteata =

Species of flowering plant

Diploglottis bracteata, commonly known as Boonjee tamarind, is a plant in the lychee family Sapindaceae found only in the Wet Tropics bioregion of Queensland, Australia. It is a tree growing to about 25 m (82 ft) in height with a fluted trunk and distinctively large bracts of flowers. It was first described by the Dutch botanist Pieter Willem Leenhouts in 1978, and the common name refers to the area on the Atherton Tableland where the species occurs.

== Conservation ==
As of October 2024, this species has been assessed to be of least concern by the International Union for Conservation of Nature (IUCN) and by the Queensland Government under its Nature Conservation Act.
