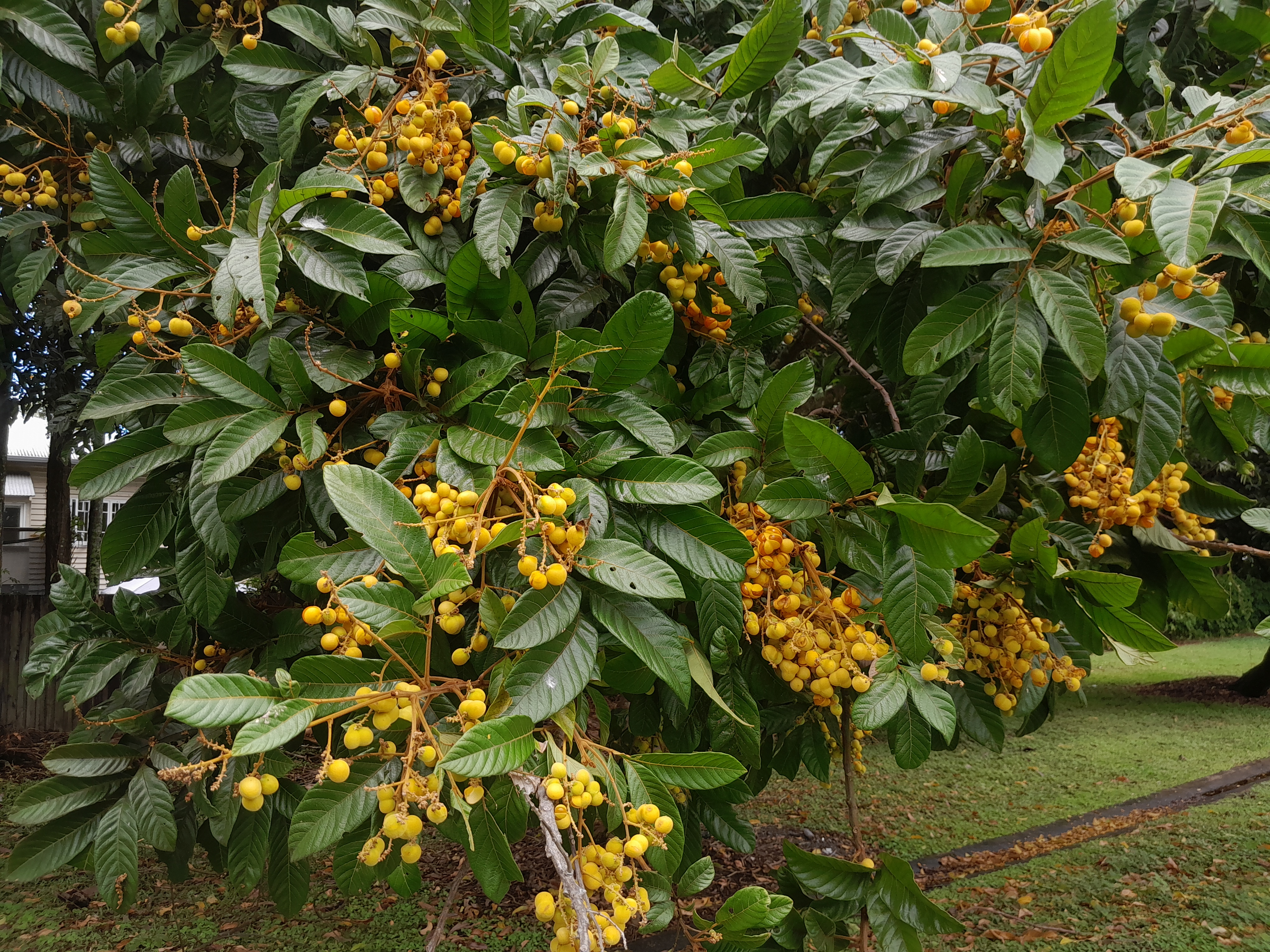
- Ripe fruit

Conservation status
- Least Concern (NCA)
- Least Concern (IUCN 3.1)

Scientific classification
- Kingdom: Plantae
- Clade: Tracheophytes
- Clade: Angiosperms
- Clade: Eudicots
- Clade: Rosids
- Order: Sapindales
- Family: Sapindaceae
- Genus: Diploglottis
- Species: D. diphyllostegia

Binomial name
- Diploglottis diphyllostegia (F.Muell.)F.M.Bailey
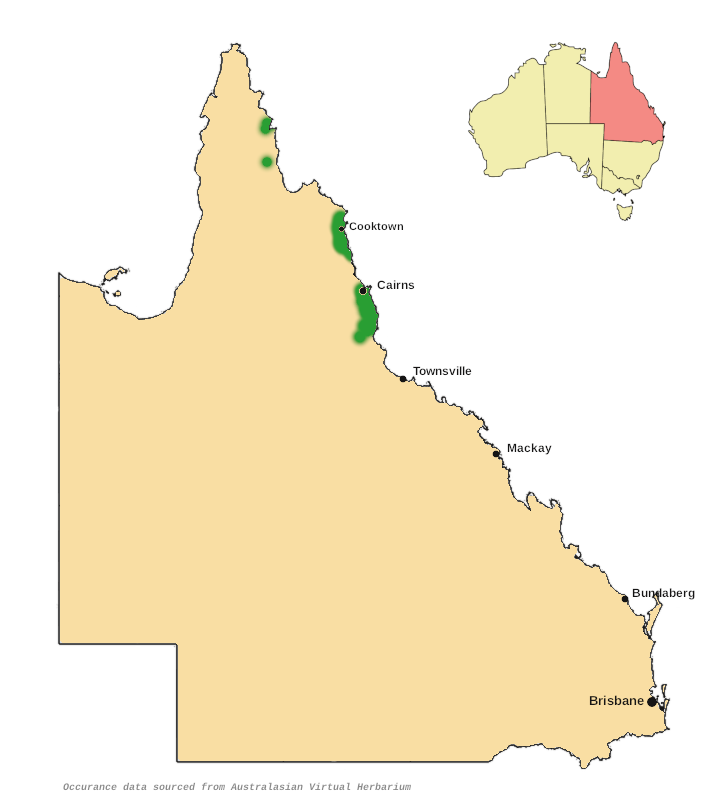

Synonyms
- Cupania diphyllostegia F.Muell.; Diploglottis australis var. muelleri (F.M.Bailey) Radlk.; Diploglottis cunninghamii var. muelleri F.M.Bailey; Ratonia diphyllostegia F.Muell.

= Diploglottis diphyllostegia =

Northern tamarind

Species of flowering plant

Diploglottis diphyllostegia, commonly known as the northern tamarind, native tamarind or wild tamarind, is a tree in the lychee family Sapindaceae which is endemic to Queensland, Australia. It is an attractive tree with potential in cultivation, with a dense crown of dark green leaves and masses of fruit in spring and summer.

== Description ==
Diploglottis diphyllostegia is a tree growing up to 30 m (98 ft) high. The trunk is up to 30 cm (12 in) diameter, often fluted or irregularly shaped in cross section and may be buttressed. The large compound leaves measure around 40–50 cm (16–20 in) long with up to 9 leaflets either side of the rachis. The leaflets are dark green above and lighter green below, with 14–22 very obvious lateral veins either side of the midrib. The compound leaf petiole, the rachis, the leaflet stalks and the leaflet veins are all covered in a fine golden brown indumentum.

The inflorescence is a large panicle produced in the leaf axils, carrying numerous flowers and measuring about 26 cm (10 in) long. The flowers are small, around 5 mm (0.20 in) diameter, with 4 or 5 petals and 8 stamens.

The fruit is a yellow-orange capsule with 2 or 3 segments, each containing a single seed fully surrounded by a thick, translucent, yellow/orange, bilobed aril. The seed is brown and about 1 cm (0.39 in) long.

=== Phenology ===
Flowering occurs from June to November, and is quickly followed by the fruit from July to December.

== Taxonomy ==
This species was first described in 1866 by the German born botanist Ferdinand von Mueller, who gave it the name Cupania diphyllostegia and published it in his work Fragmenta phytographiæ Australiæ. In 1886 it was transferred to the genus Diploglottis by Frederick Manson Bailey.

=== Etymology ===
The genus name Diploglottis comes from the Neo-Latin words diplo- meaning double, combined with glottis meaning tongue, and refers to the two tongue-like scales on the petals. The species epithet diphyllostegia combines the prefix "di" meaning two, with the Ancient Greek words φύλλον (phyllon) meaning leaf, and στέγη (stégō) meaning cover. It can be translated as "two-leaved covering" and is a reference to the bilobed aril that encloses the seed.

The common names for this taxon refer to the well known Tamarind (Tamarindus indica) that is widely used in cuisines, due to the similarity of taste of the two. However D. diphyllostegia is not closely related to T. indica.

== Distribution and habitat ==
The northern tamarind is endemic to Queensland, occurring from the top of Cape York Peninsula south through eastern coastal regions to near Ingham. Recorded observations of this species at the Australasian Virtual Herbarium that occur further south near Mackay are likely to be reclassified as Diploglottis obovata. There is also a single observation of D. diphyllostegia from New Guinea that requires further verification.

The species grows on rainforest margins and in riparian forest, at altitudes from sea level to around 900 m (3,000 ft).

== Ecology ==
The fruit are eaten by Orange-footed scrubfowl (Megapodius reinwardt), cassowaries (Casuarius casuarius), Metallic starlings (Aplonis metallica) and native rodents.

== Conservation ==
This species is listed by both the International Union for Conservation of Nature (IUCN) and the Queensland Department of Environment and Science as least concern.

== Cultivation and uses ==
The northern tamarind has become commonly cultivated due to its attractive crown of glossy, textured leaves and large crops of colourful fruit. A small number have been planted in the streets and parks of Cairns.

The aril of this species (and others in the genus) is edible and has a sweet, tart flavour; it has been used to make juices, jams, sauces and preserves.

== Gallery ==
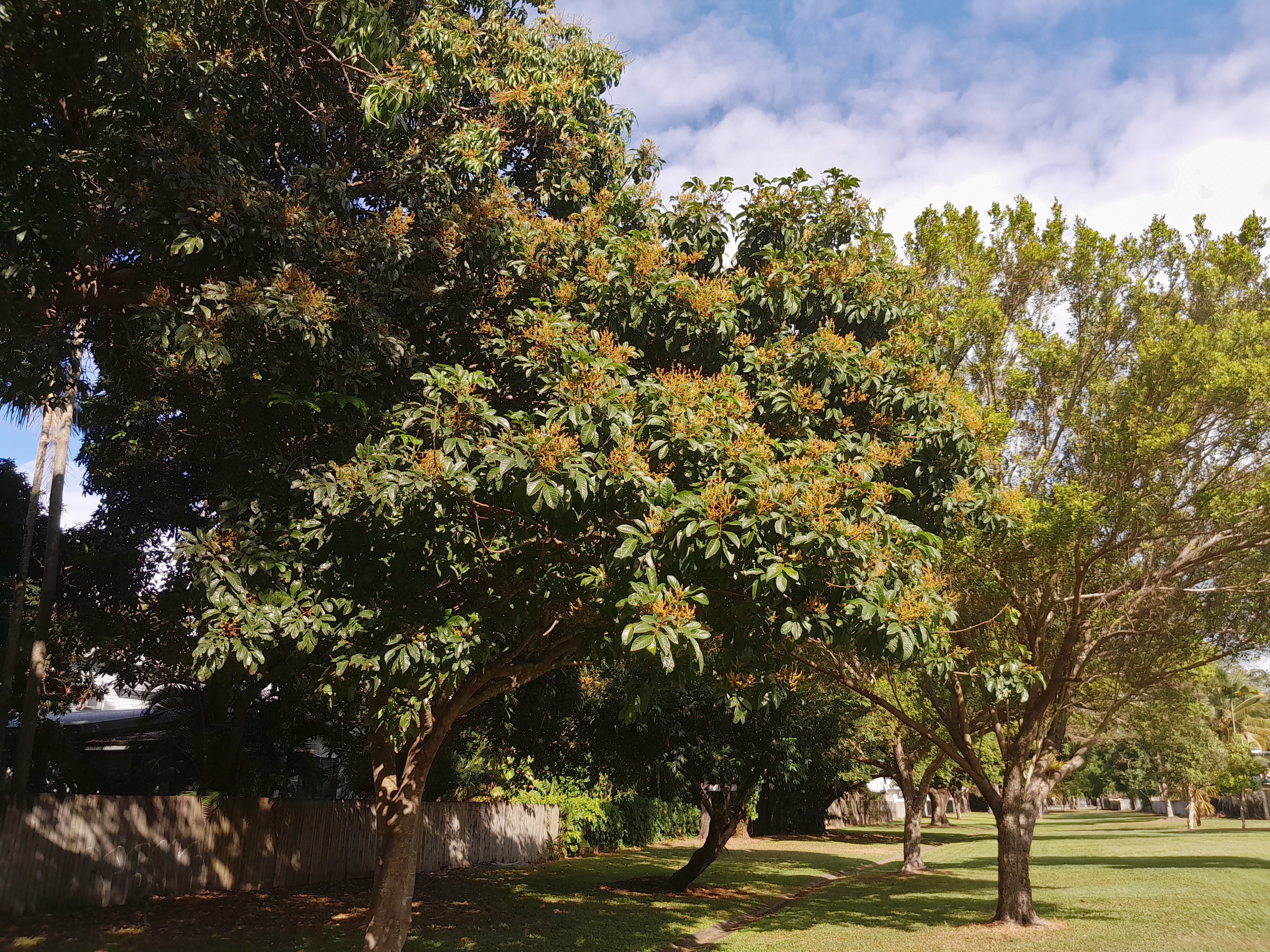
Cultivated in Cairns

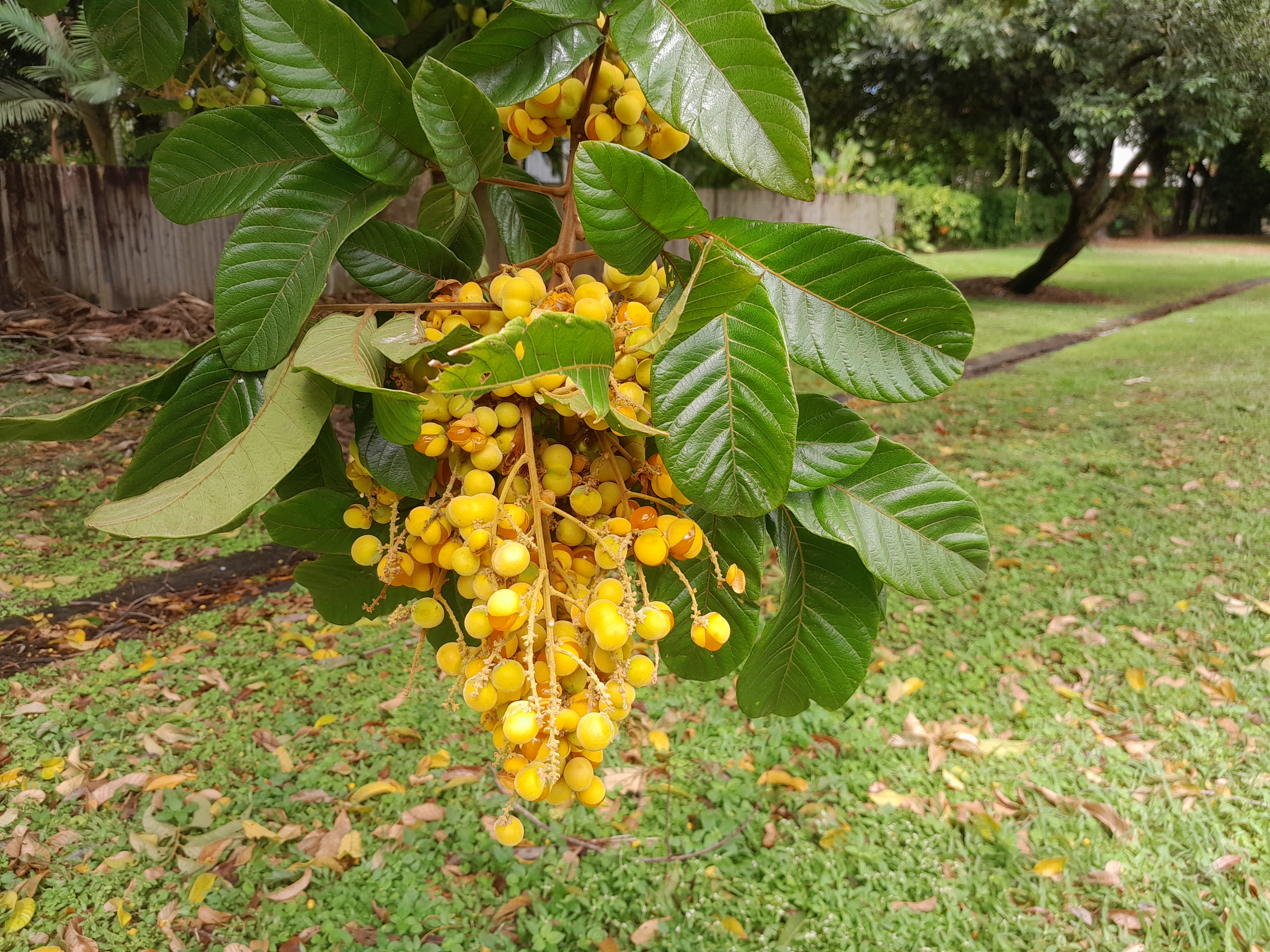
Fruiting

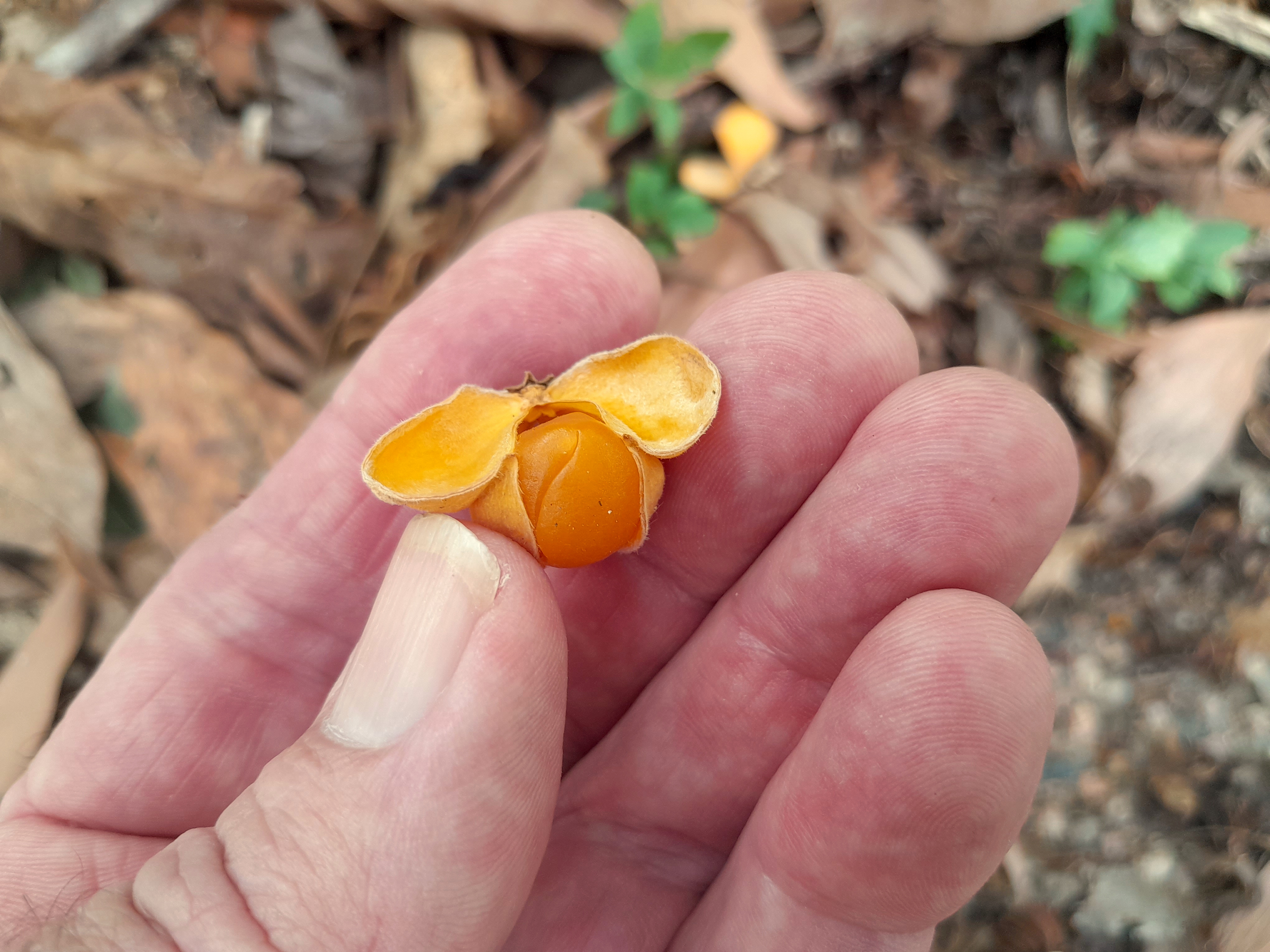
Ripe fruit with orange aril

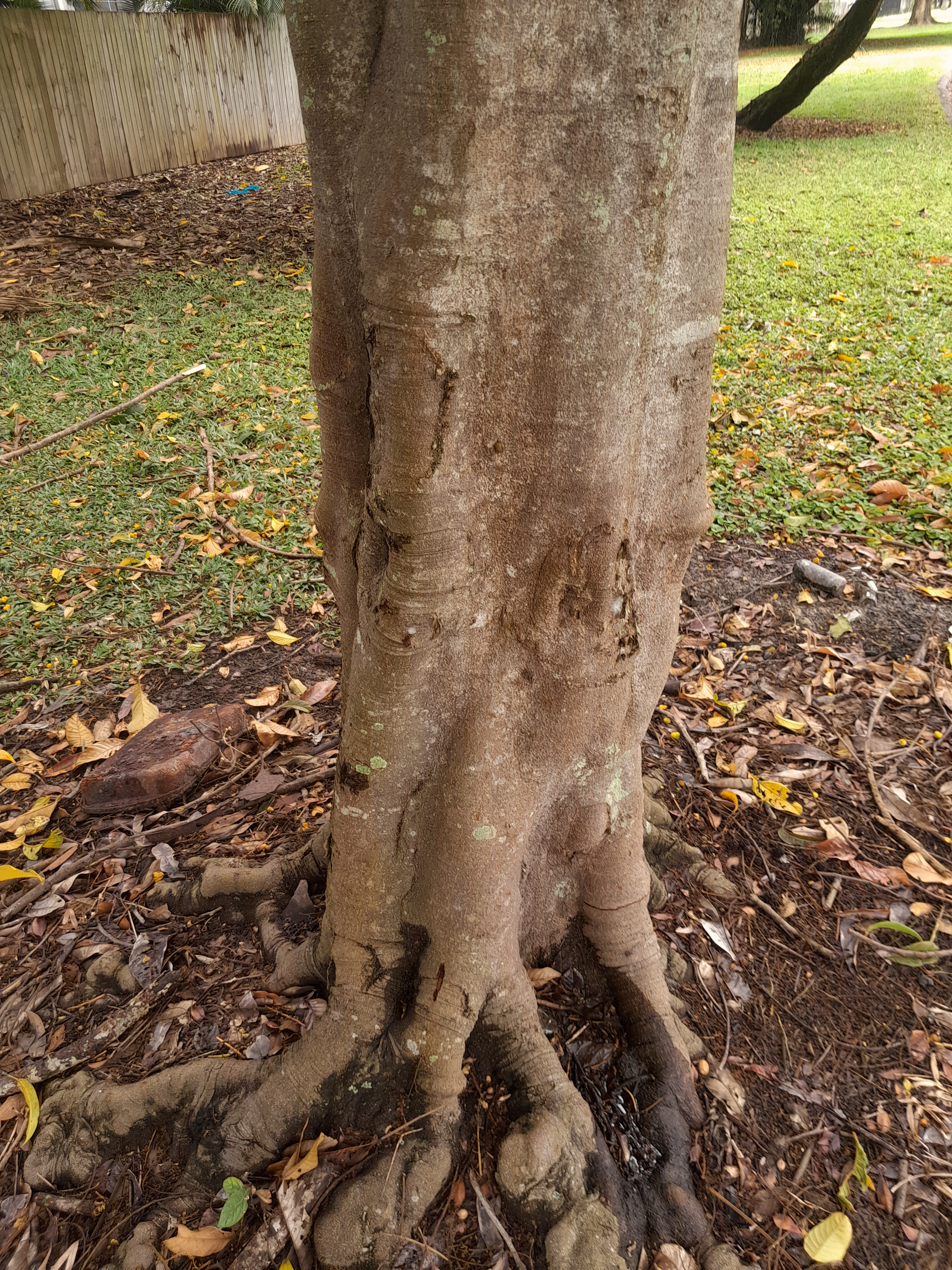
Trunk

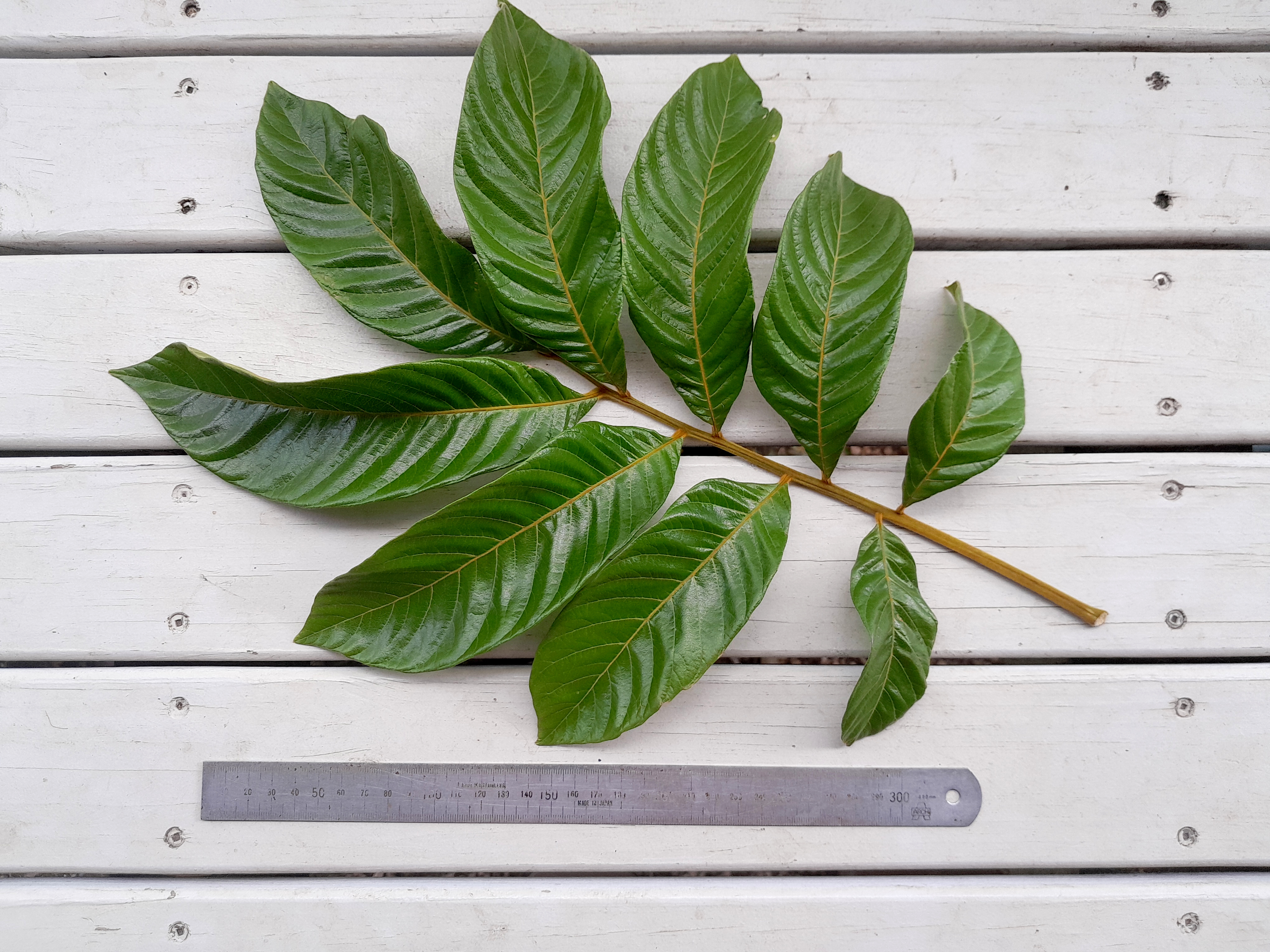
Compound leaf

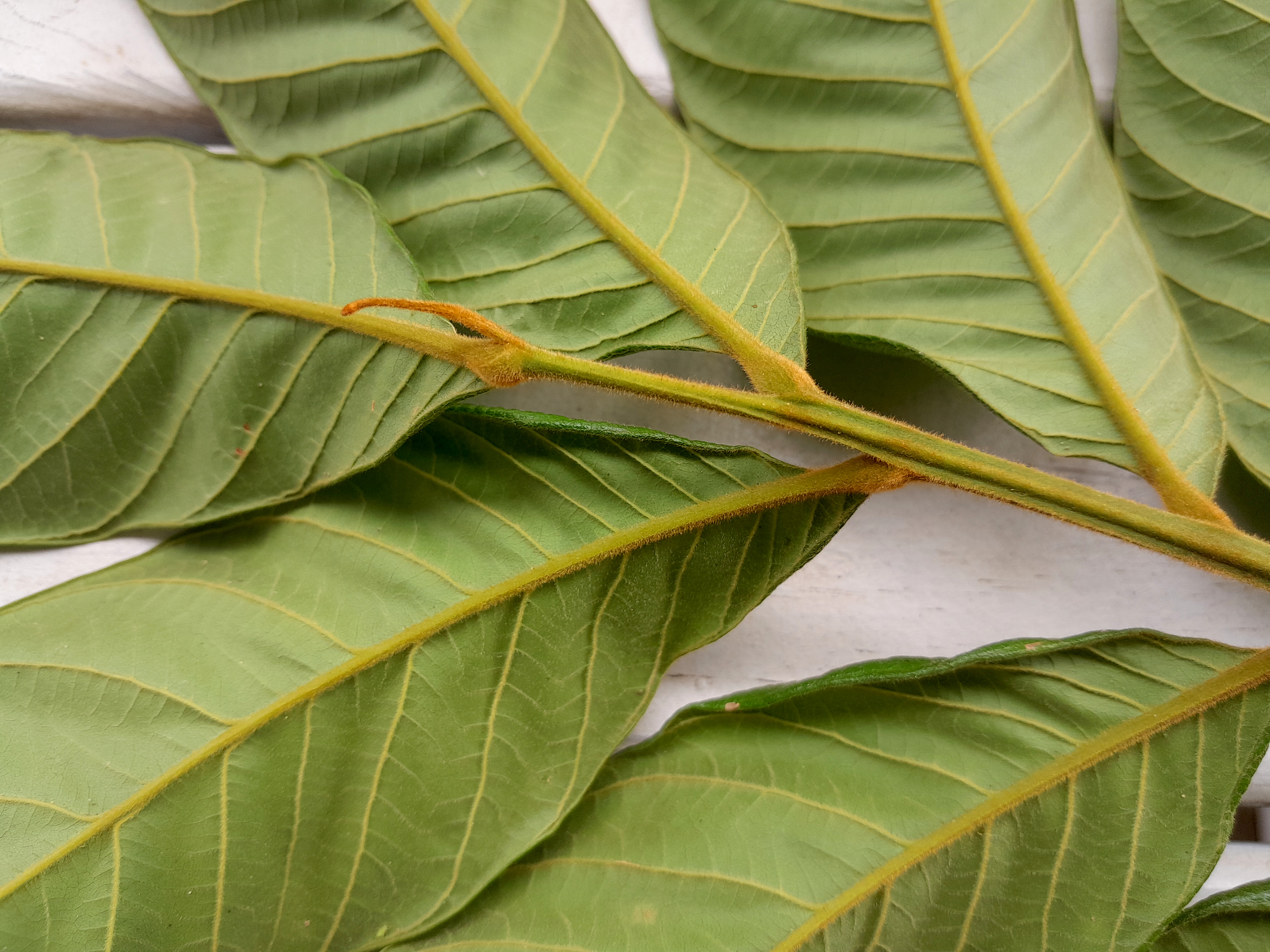
Close up of leaf undersides with dense golden hairs

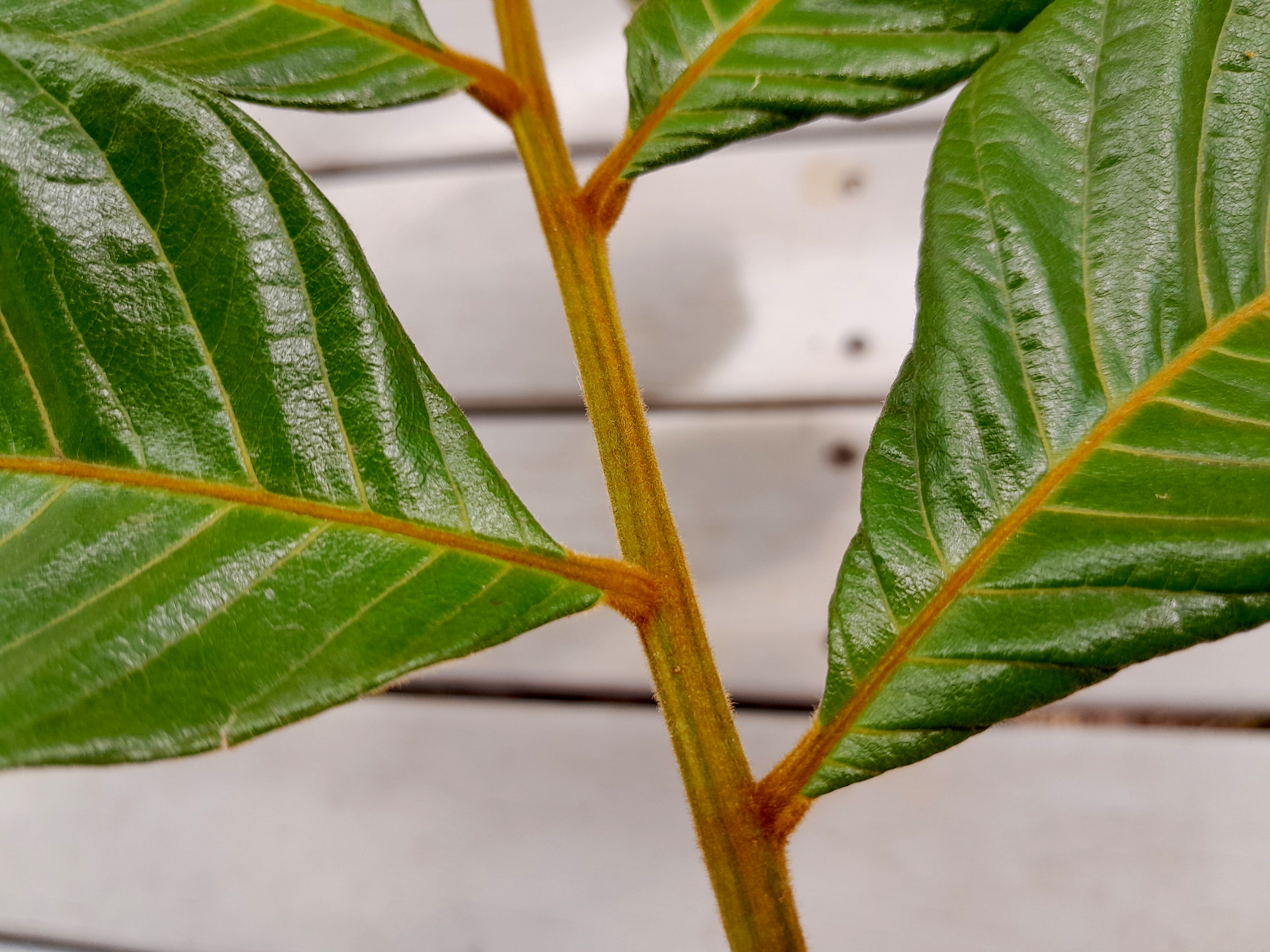
Grooved rachis
