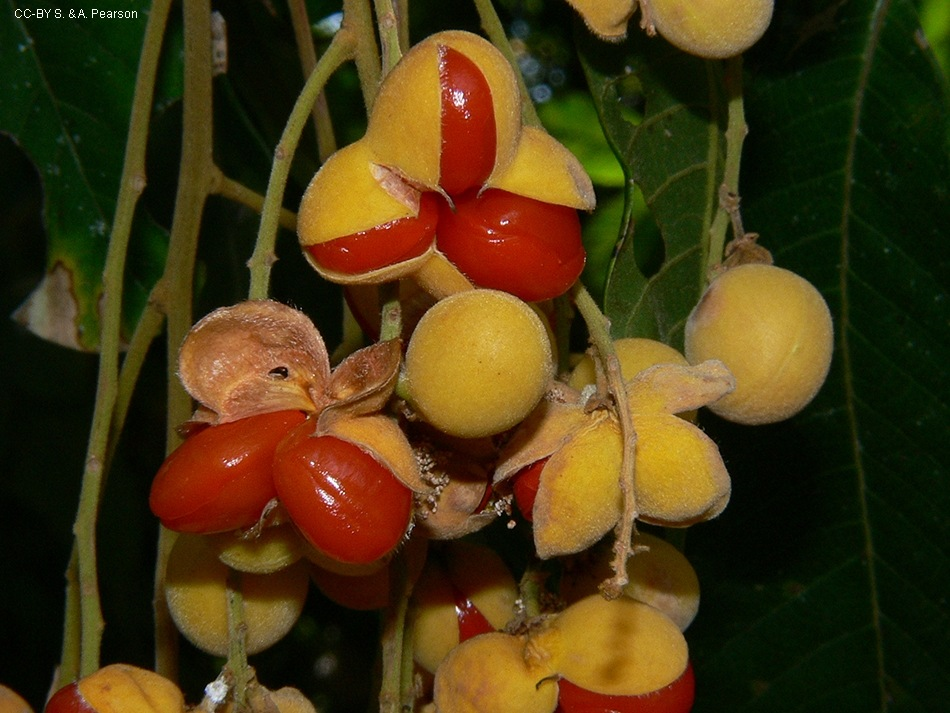
- Ripe fruit

Conservation status
- Least Concern (NCA)

Scientific classification
- Kingdom: Plantae
- Clade: Tracheophytes
- Clade: Angiosperms
- Clade: Eudicots
- Clade: Rosids
- Order: Sapindales
- Family: Sapindaceae
- Genus: Diploglottis
- Species: D. obovata

Binomial name
- Diploglottis obovata S.T.Reynolds

= Diploglottis obovata =

Blunt-leaved tamarind

Species of flowering plant

Diploglottis obovata, commonly known as blunt-leaved tamarind, is a plant in the family Sapindaceae endemic to central eastern Queensland, Australia. Until 1987 it was considered to be a form of the very closely related Diploglottis diphyllostegia.

== Description ==
The blunt-leaved tamarind is a small to medium-sized, spreading, evergreen tree growing up to 25 m (82 ft) high. It is very similar to Diploglottis diphyllostegia with branchlets, leaves and subdivisions covered in a dense light brown indumentum. The compound leaves have 2 or 3 pairs of leaflets either side of the midrib and no terminal leaflet, measuring overall about 20 cm (7.9 in) long. The leaflets are obovate to elliptic and measure up to 16 cm (6.3 in) long by 7 cm (2.8 in) wide.

The inflorescence is a panicle up to 19 cm (7.5 in) long and 10 cm (3.9 in) wide, with both staminate (functionally male) and pistillate (functionally female) flowers in the same inflorescence. Individual flowers have 5 petals with one petal usually reduced, measure about 5 mm (0.20 in) wide, and are held on a pedicel up to 3 mm (0.12 in) long.

The fruit is very similar to that of D. diphyllostegia, a 2- or 3-lobed capsule measuring up to 1.6 cm (0.63 in) long by 3 cm (1.2 in) wide with one seed per lobe, which is enveloped in an orange or red aril.

== Taxonomy ==
The species was first described by the Australian botanist Sally T. Reynolds in 1987, and published in the journal Austrobaileya. Prior to that it had been treated as a form of Diploglottis diphyllostegia.

=== Etymology ===
The genus name Diploglottis comes from the Neo-Latin words diplo- meaning double, combined with glottis meaning tongue, and refers to the two tongue-like scales on the petals. The species epithet obovata refers to the obovate shape of the leaflets.

== Distribution and habitat ==
The blunt-leaved tamarind is endemic to coastal and sub-coastal areas of central Queensland, from the area around Proserpine to near Bee Creek, southwest of Sarina. It grows in rainforest, most commonly on creek banks in notophyll vine forest.

== Conservation ==
This species is listed by the Queensland Department of Environment and Science as least concern. As of 16 October 2023, it has not been assessed by the International Union for Conservation of Nature (IUCN).

== Gallery ==
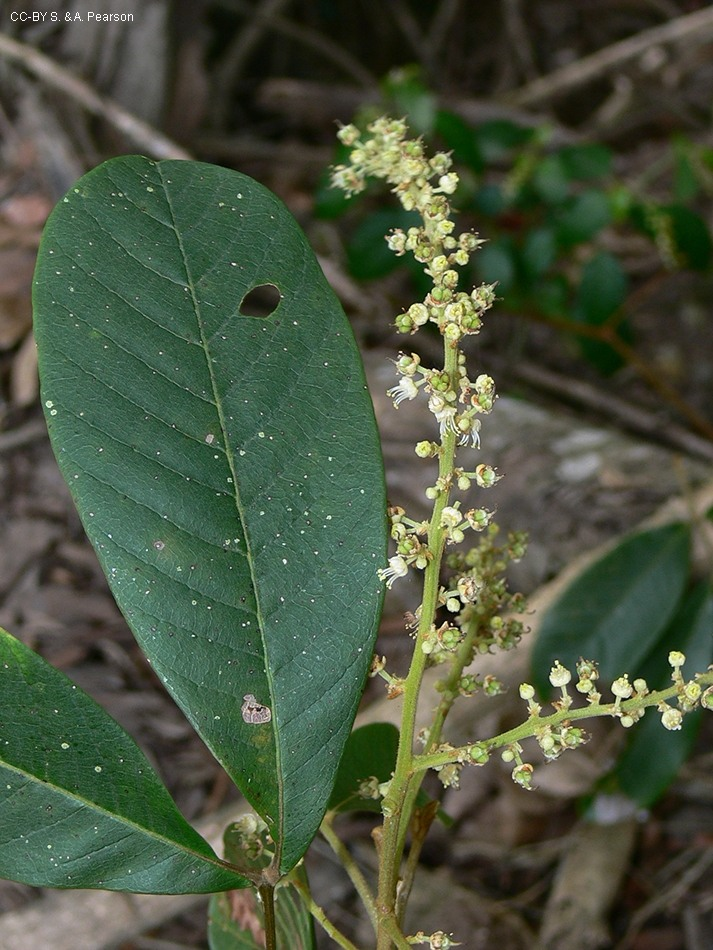
Flower spike

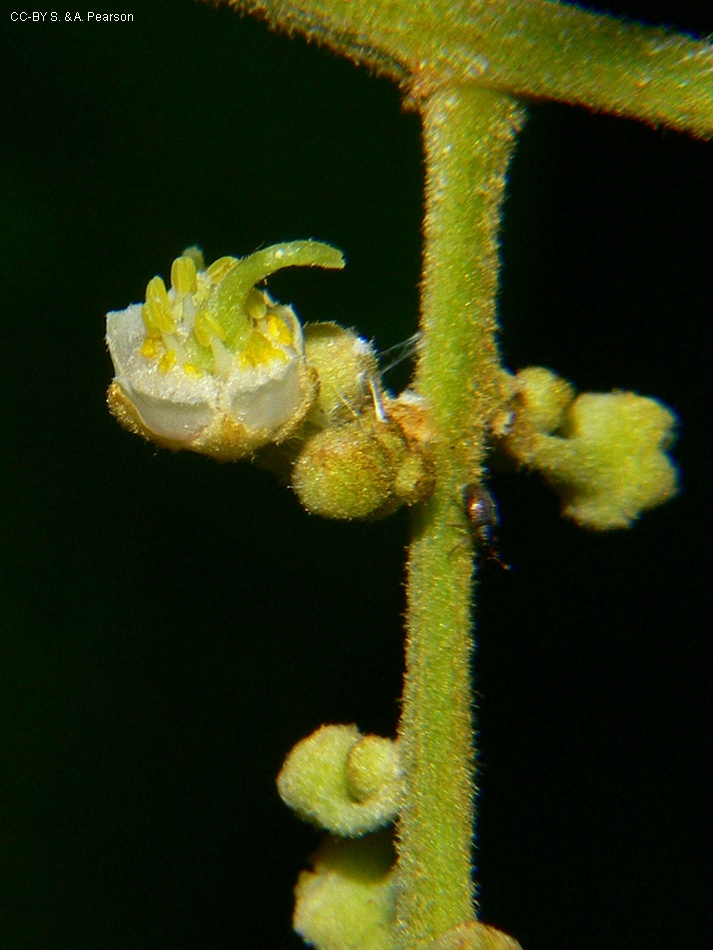
Close up of flower

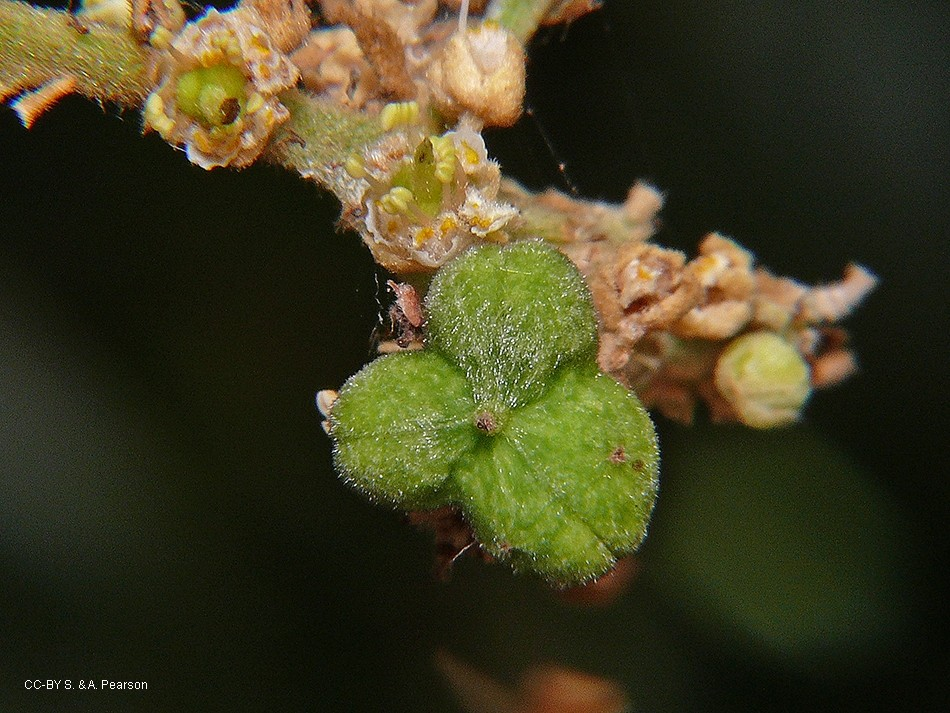
Immature fruit
