= Peppersoup =

Type of soup originating in Nigeria

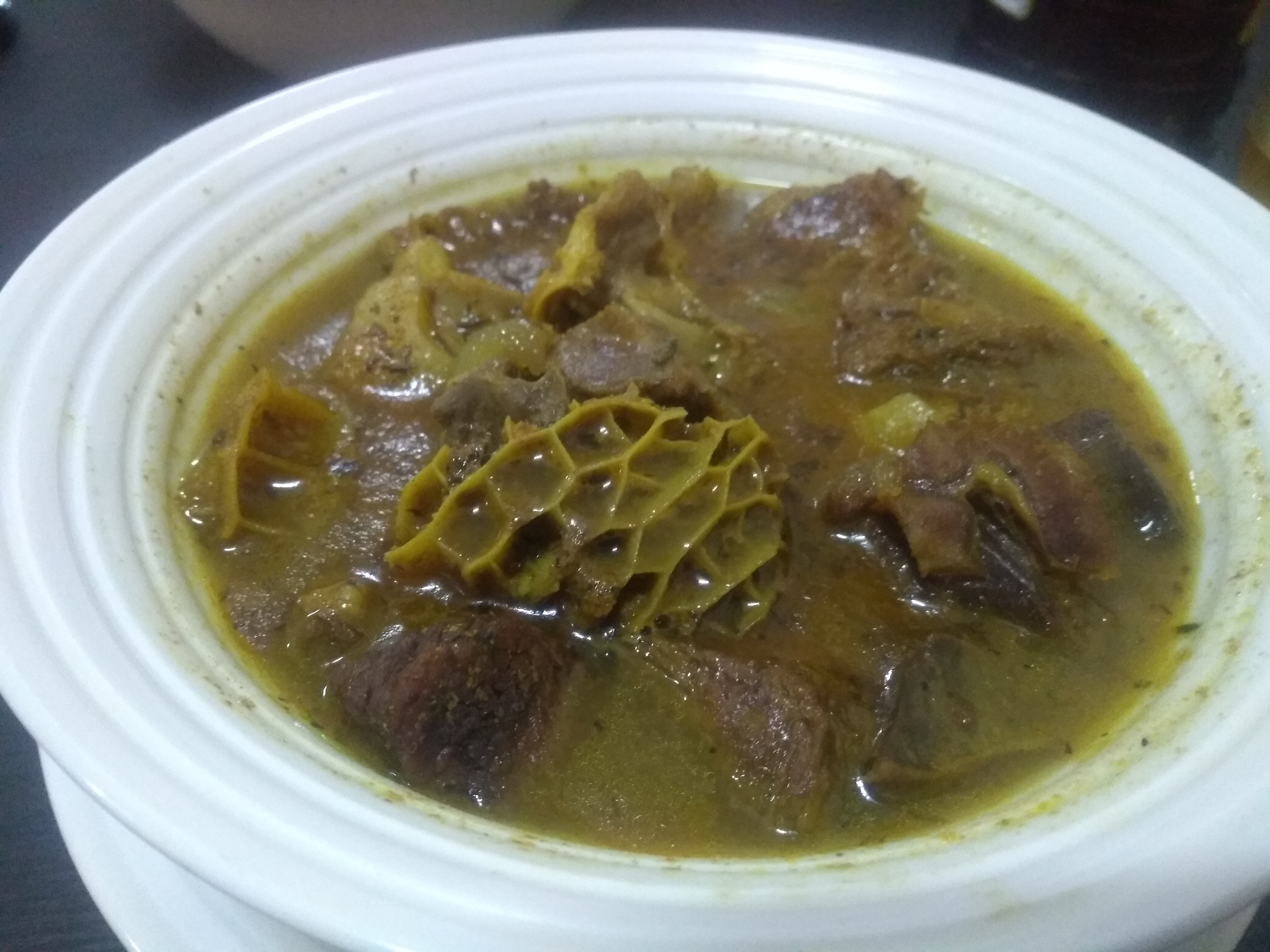
A bowl of peppersoup with different meats

Peppersoup (or pepper soup) is a soup eaten by Cameroonians and Nigerians. This soup is made using various meats or fish, chili peppers, salt, scent leaves and calabash nutmeg as its primary ingredients. It is a spicy soup that has a light, watery texture. Despite its name, the soup is not necessarily defined by a pepper-forward flavor profile; the flavors are more complex, with nutty, bitter, woodsy, and floral notes, as well as warmth. It is considered a delicacy by some people in Western Africa, and some West Africans believe that the soup has some basic medicinal qualities.

== Overview ==
Pepper soup is a common soup in Nigeria that is prepared using various meats, fishes, chili peppers and calabash nutmeg as its primary ingredients. Pepper soup is very spicy and is often paired with a cold beer or soft drink. While it is served as an appetizer at official gatherings, pepper soup is more popular at pubs. In Nigeria, it is served at "leisure spots" as a recreational or "feel good" dish. Pepper soup cubes, a pre-mixed blend of spices used in pepper soup, are manufactured by one Nigerian company.

== Description ==
Pepper soup is typically a watery soup. It can be prepared with combinations of various meats, such as fish, shrimp, tripe, oxtail, chicken, game, goat, beef or cow hide. Additional ingredients can include tomatoes, onion, green onions, garlic, sweet peppers, ginger, cloves, cinnamon and lime juice. Fufu, a food prepared from boiled and then pounded cassava or other tubers, is sometimes used as an ingredient, which thickens the soup and serves to impart a creamy texture. It is sometimes served with side dishes such as rice or boiled tubers, or served atop these ingredients. On the western coast of Africa, it is typically cooked outdoors in a cauldron.

Pepper soup is considered to be a delicacy among riverine people in Nigeria. It is a popular soup in Nigeria (Southern region) and in other English-speaking countries in Western Africa. Some West Africans believe that chicken pepper soup has medicinal qualities, and it is served to ill people. Pepper soup is also sometimes consumed by new mothers, because it is believed by some to assist in general healing of the body and in the secretion of breast milk. It is also often consumed after wedding celebrations, as a means to restore health.

== See also ==
- Goat meat pepper soup
- List of soups
