= Goat meat pepper soup =

Spicy Nigerian soup

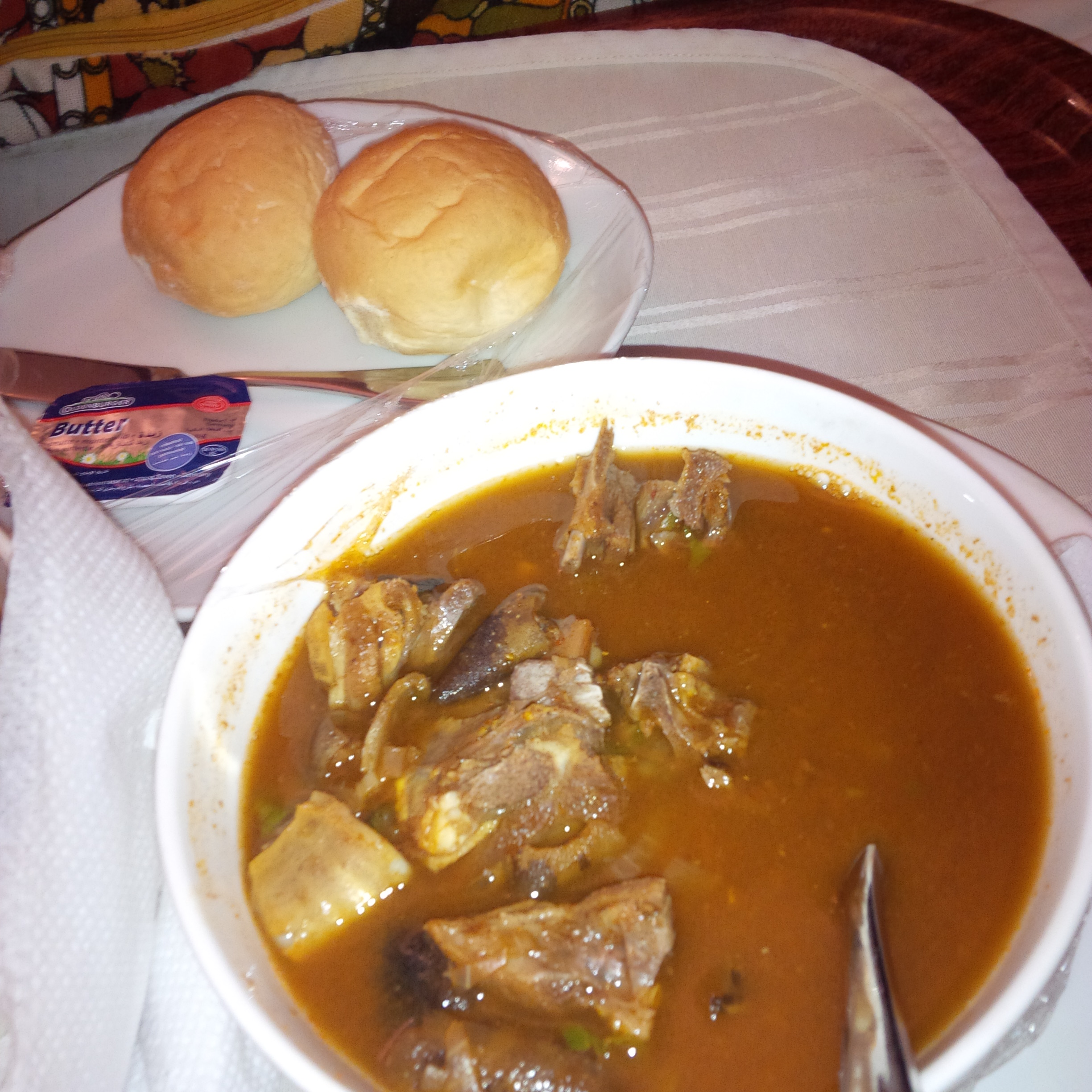
Goat meat pepper soup served with bread

Goat meat pepper soup, also referred to as nwo-nwo, ngwo-ngwo, and goat pepper soup, is a soup in Nigeria. Goat meat is used as a primary ingredient, and some versions may use crayfish. Boiled yams, potatoes, or plantains may be added in other variations. The soup is served hot and is made with a blend of different spices which gives an intense spiciness and flavor to the soup. The dish has been described as being the most popular out of all the Nigerian pepper soups. It is a light soup that is often prepared without the use of oil, and may also be drunk in the style of a beverage. Owing to the ‘light’ texture of the soup, it is typically eaten alone but it can be accompanied by a side-dish known as agidi (a type of cornmeal that is regarded as best-paired with okra and pepper soups, alike). White rice is also a common side-dish served with goat meat pepper soup. It has been described as pairing well with palm wine and beer.

== History ==
Goat meat pepper soup is eaten year round in Nigeria, during hot or cold seasons. It is claimed to help ease a flu or cold if it is cooked the proper way. If assorted parts of the goat are used, certain pieces may need to be cooked longer than others.

There are different varieties of pepper soup which vary according to region, with different combinations of spices. For instance, the Igbo people, in the east, and Riverians in the southeast, prepare their pepper soup with tomatoes, onions and spices. Those of Delta origin sometimes prepare the pepper soup with ataiko, uda, gbafilo, rigije, and lemon grass leaves. In Yoruba, goat meat pepper soup is sometimes referred to as Oggun.

== Preparation ==
There are many different ingredients used depending on the region and availability. Common ingredients in goat meat pepper soup are goat meat, crayfish, uziza, Negro pepper (also called Uda Ewentia or Enge) and nutmeg, such as calabash nutmeg (also called Ehu or Ariwo). Other ingredients that are commonly used when access to traditional ingredients is limited are bouillon cubes, onion, salt, pepper, basil and chili pepper. Some versions also use a goat's head. Preparation involves cleaning and seasoning the meat and simmering with chopped onions, after which water is added and the dish is further cooked. The dish may be finished with seasoning such as salt, pepper and basil.

== See also ==
- List of goat dishes
- List of soups
- Peppersoup
