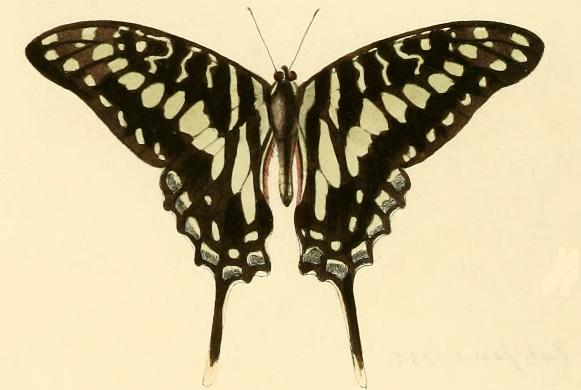

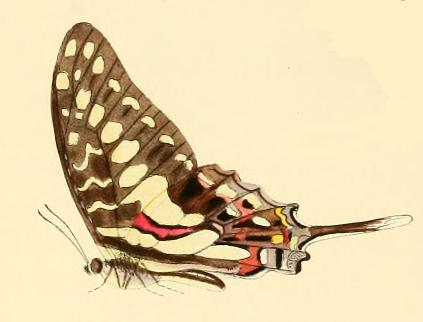

Scientific classification
- Kingdom: Animalia
- Phylum: Arthropoda
- Clade: Pancrustacea
- Class: Insecta
- Order: Lepidoptera
- Family: Papilionidae
- Genus: Graphium
- Species: G. porthaon

Binomial name
- Graphium porthaon (Hewitson, 1865)

Subspecies
- See text

Synonyms
- Papilio porthaon Hewitson, 1865; Papilio porthaon ab. adjectus Thurau, 1903; Papilio porthaon vernayi van Son, 1936

= Graphium porthaon =

Cream striped swordtail

Species of butterfly

Graphium porthaon, the coastal swordtail, cream-striped swordtail or dark swordtail, is a species of butterfly in the family Papilionidae, found in tropical western Africa.

The wingspan is 55–60 mm in males and 60–65 mm in females. External images from Royal Museum of Central Africa.The species has continuous broods during warmer months.

The larvae feed on Artabotrys monteiroae, Annona, Uvaria, Friesodielsia obovata, Cleistochlamys kirkii, Monodora junodii, Monanthotaxis caffra, Uvaria caffra, and Uvaria kirkii.

== Subspecies ==
- Graphium porthaon porthaon (Hewitson, 1865) (coast of Kenya, Tanzania, Democratic Republic of the Congo, Angola, Malawi, Zambia, Mozambique, Zimbabwe, northern Botswana, Namibia, South Africa, Swaziland)
- Graphium porthaon tanganyikae Kielland, 1978 (Tanzania: Kigoma district)
- Graphium porthaon mackiei Collins & Larsen, 1991(Kenya, Tanzania)

== Taxonomy ==
It is a member of the Graphium policenes-clade (policenes, Graphium liponesco, Graphium biokoensis, Graphium policenoides, Graphium porthaon.)

Aurivillius in Seitz places porthaon, policenes,sisenna (polistratus), polistratus, junodi, nigrescens (policenoides) and collona in the Policenes Group Subgroup 2 circumscribed Hindwing with a long, narrow tail of uniform width at vein 4. Frons black with white lateral margins. Wings above with green or greenish white markings. Cell of the forewing with 5 — 6 transverse bands or spots. Both wings with submarginal spots. Hindwing beneath with a so-called ornamental band, formed of red spots. Besides the markings already mentioned the forewing has a spot at the base of cellules 1 a and 1 b, an oblique transverse streak in the basal part of these cellules and 8 discal spots, one each in cellules 1 a — 6 and 8; the hindwing has a narrow transverse band at the base, a narrow median band which consists only of three spots (in the cell and in cellules 2 and 7) and usually also 7 discal spots in cellules 1 c -7, of 'which, however, that in 1 c is red. The larva has four pairs of spines, one pair each on the 1., 2., 3. and penultimate segments. The pupa is very angularly widened at the beginning of the abdomen and has a long hump on the mesothorax. Subgroup 2.The apical fourth of the cell of the hindwing above unicolorous black without light spot. The cell of the forewing with a light spot or dot at the costal margin close before the apex.
