= Monodora carolinae =

Conservation status
- Endangered (IUCN 3.1)

Scientific classification
- Kingdom: Plantae
- Clade: Embryophytes
- Clade: Tracheophytes
- Clade: Angiosperms
- Clade: Magnoliids
- Order: Magnoliales
- Family: Annonaceae
- Genus: Monodora
- Species: M. carolinae

Binomial name
- Monodora carolinae Couvreur

Species of flowering plant

Monodora carolinae is a species of flowering plant in the family Annonaceae. It is a tree native to northeastern Mozambique and eastern Tanzania. Thomas Couvreur, the botanist who first formally described the species, named it after his wife Carolina.

== Description ==
It is a tree reaching 6 meters (20 ft) in height. Its branches have lenticels. Its leathery leaves are 8-10 by 4-6 centimeters and come to a point at their tips. The leaves are smooth on their upper and lower surfaces when mature. Its petioles are 4 millimeters long. Its pendulous flowers are solitary and axillary. Each flower is on a smooth pedicel 13-35 millimeters long. Its flowers have 3 rust-colored, triangular sepals that are 6-12 by 4-8 millimeters long with hairy margins. Its 6 petals are arranged in two rows of 3. The smooth outer petals are cream-colored with red spots and curve backwards. The outer petals are 15-25 by 6-12 millimeters, have wavy margins, and come to a point at their tip. The inner petals have a 3-5 by 2-4 millimeter claw at their base and a 6-15 by 6-14 millimeter blade that is cream-colored with red and yellow highlights. The blades of the inner petals have densely hairy margins. Its stamens are 0.8 millimeters long.

=== Reproductive biology ===
The pollen of M. carolinae is shed as permanent tetrads.

== Habitat and distribution ==
It has been observed growing in sandy, well-drained soils in mountainous forests at elevations from 1,700 to 2,000 meters (5,600 to 6,600 ft).
