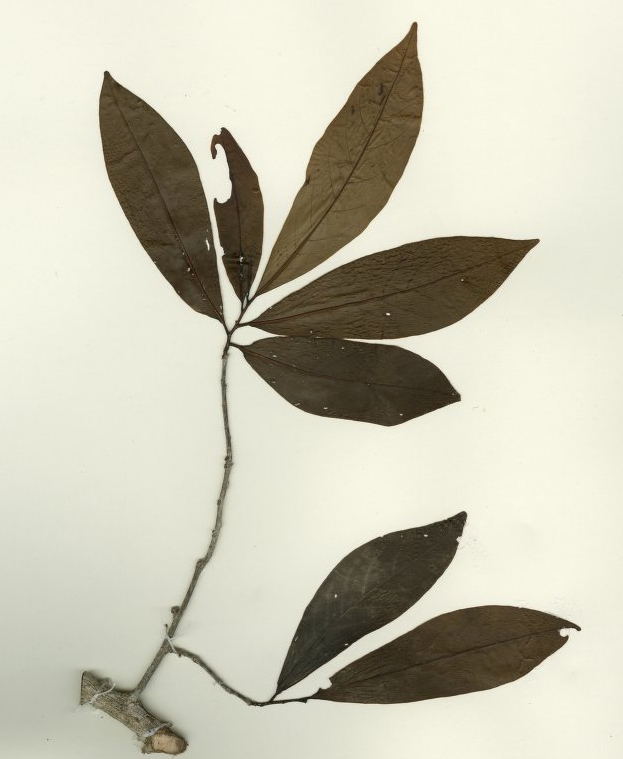
- Photograph of an herbarium specimen of Monodora hastipetala

Conservation status
- Endangered (IUCN 3.1)

Scientific classification
- Kingdom: Plantae
- Clade: Embryophytes
- Clade: Tracheophytes
- Clade: Spermatophytes
- Clade: Angiosperms
- Clade: Magnoliids
- Order: Magnoliales
- Family: Annonaceae
- Genus: Monodora
- Species: M. hastipetala

Binomial name
- Monodora hastipetala Couvreur

= Monodora hastipetala =

Species of plant in the soursop family

Monodora hastipetala is a species of flowering plant in the family Annonaceae. It is a tree endemic to eastern Tanzania. Thomas Couvreur, the botanist who first formally described the species, named it after its spear (hasti- in Latin) shaped inner petals.

== Description ==
It is a tree reaching 8 meters (26 ft) in height. Its branches have lenticels. Its papery leaves are 10–12 by 3–4 centimeters (3.9–4.7 by 1.2–1.6 in) and come to a point at their tips. The leaves are smooth on their upper and lower surfaces. Its petioles are 2 millimeters long. Its pendulous flowers are solitary and axillary. Each flower is on a pedicel 17–10 millimeters long. Its flowers have 3 smooth sepals that are 6–7 by 3–4 millimeters with rounded tips. Its 6 petals are arranged in two rows of 3. The white, narrow outer petals are 20–26 by 6–8 millimeters. The outer petals are smooth and wavy. The inner petals are white with purple highlights, have a 4–5 millimeter long claw at their base and a 10–17 by 4–7 millimeter wide blade. The inner petals are densely hairy on the inner surface of their base and less hairy on the outer surface. It has 40–50 stamens that are 0.6 millimeters long. Its bumpy oval-shaped fruit are 30 millimeters long and 20 millimeters in diameter. Its light brown seeds are 10 by 7 millimeters.

=== Reproductive biology ===
The pollen of M. hastipetala is shed as permanent tetrads.

== Habitat and distribution ==
It has been observed growing in scrub and coastal forests at elevations from 200 to 400 meters (660 to 1,300 ft).
