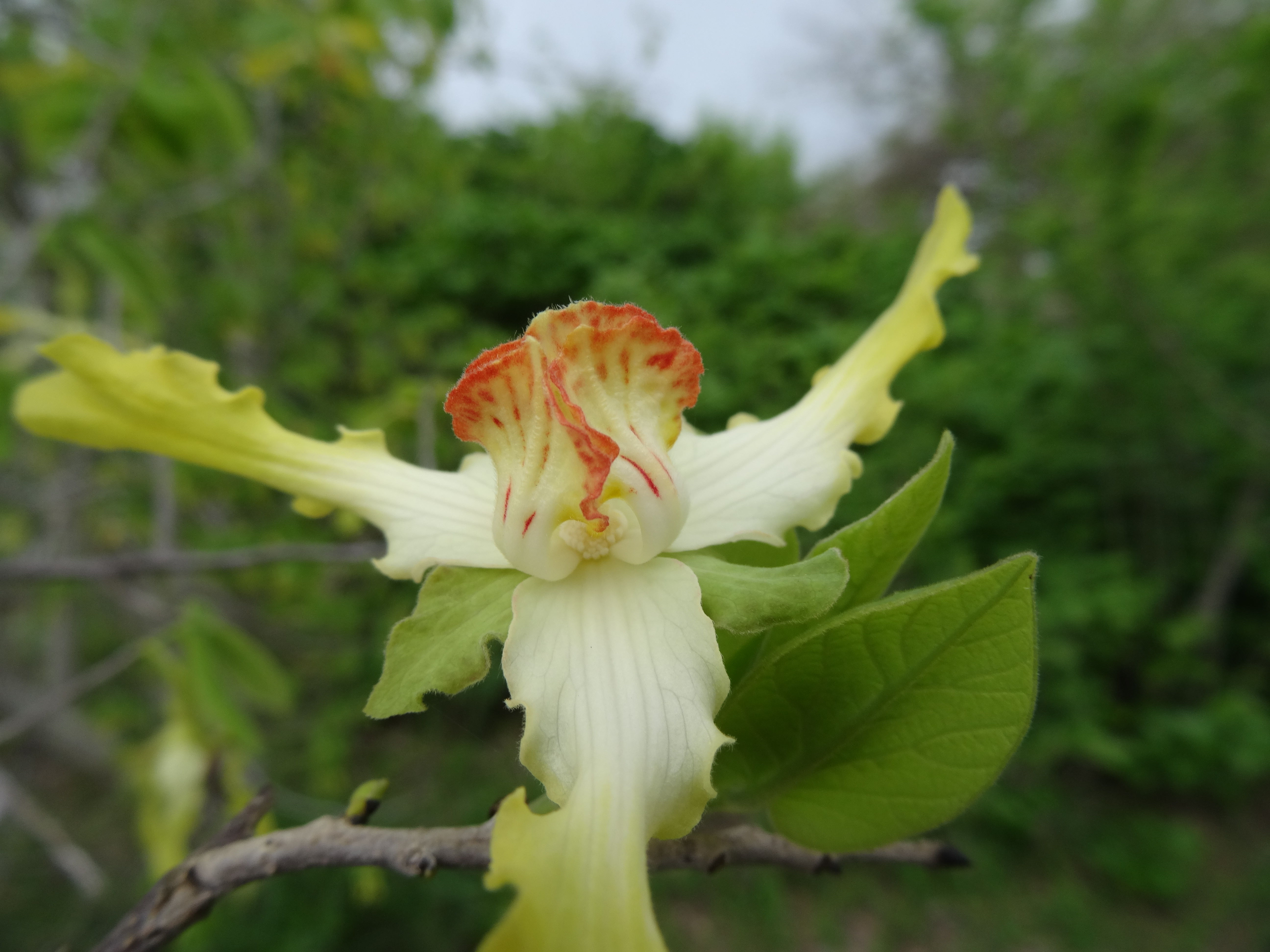

Conservation status
- Least Concern (IUCN 3.1)

Scientific classification
- Kingdom: Plantae
- Clade: Embryophytes
- Clade: Tracheophytes
- Clade: Spermatophytes
- Clade: Angiosperms
- Clade: Magnoliids
- Order: Magnoliales
- Family: Annonaceae
- Genus: Monodora
- Species: M. grandidieri

Binomial name
- Monodora grandidieri Baill.

Synonyms
- Monodora somalensis Chiov. Monodora stocksii Sprague; Monodora veithii Engl. & Diels

= Monodora grandidieri =

Species of plant in the soursop family

Monodora grandidieri is a species of plant in the family Annonaceae. It is native to Kenya, Malawi, Mozambique, Somalia, and Tanzania. Henri Ernest Baillon, the French botanist who first formally described the species, named it after the French naturalist and explorer Alfred Grandidier who collected the specimen Baillon examined. It has been reported to be used as a traditional medicine by the Giriama and Digo people of Kenya.

== Description ==
It is a tree reaching 12 meters (39 ft) in height. Its branches have lenticels. Its leaves are 20–24 by 1.5–8.2 centimeters (7.9–9.4 by 0.6–3.2 in) and come to a point at their tips. Its petioles are 2–3 millimeters long. Its flowers are solitary and appear before young leaves. Each flower is on a thin, lightly hairy pedicel 2–5.7 centimeters long. Its flowers have 3 sepals that are 1–2 by 3–5.5 centimeters with wavy, densely hairy margins. The sepals curve backwards and are green or red with green veins. Its 6 petals are arranged in two rows of 3. The outer petals are light yellow with green or red highlights, curve backwards, and come to a point at their tips. The outer petals are 3.7–6.5 by 0.5–1.8 centimeters, have wavy margins, and are densely hairy on their outer surface. The inner petals are similarly colored, have a 0.7–0.9 centimeter long claw at their base and a 1.2–1.6 centimeter wide blade. Its stamens are 1 millimeters long. Its smooth, green and white fruit are 5–7.5 by 4–4.5 centimeters (2.0–3.0 by 1.6–1.8 in) in diameter. Its light brown seeds are 1.3–2.6 by 1–1.8 by 0.9–1.1 centimeters.

=== Reproductive biology ===
The pollen of M. grandidieri is shed as permanent tetrads.
