= Monodora globiflora =

Conservation status
- Least Concern (IUCN 3.1)

Scientific classification
- Kingdom: Plantae
- Clade: Embryophytes
- Clade: Tracheophytes
- Clade: Spermatophytes
- Clade: Angiosperms
- Clade: Magnoliids
- Order: Magnoliales
- Family: Annonaceae
- Genus: Monodora
- Species: M. globiflora

Binomial name
- Monodora globiflora Couvreur

Species of plant in the soursop family

Monodora globiflora is a species of plant in the family Annonaceae. It is native to Tanzania. Thomas Couvreur, the botanist who first formally described the species, named it after its inner petals that touch one another, but are not fused, and form a globe–shaped structure.

== Description ==
It is a tree reaching 4 meters (13 ft) in height. Its branches have lenticels. Its papery leaves are 12–13 by 4–5 centimeters (4.7–5.1 by 1.6–2.0 in) and come to a point at their tips. The leaves are smooth on their upper and lightly hairy on their lower surfaces. Its petioles are 8 millimeters long. Its pendulous flowers are solitary and axillary. Each flower is on a thin, lightly hairy pedicel 40–45 millimeters long. Its flowers have 3 sepals that are 8–10 by 6–8 millimeters long with densely hairy margins. Its 6 petals are arranged in two rows of 3. The smooth outer petals are light yellow with red highlights, or light green with dark green highlights, and curve slightly backwards. The outer petals are 28–32 by 18–23 millimeters and have wavy margins. The inner petals have a 3–5 by 2–4 millimeter claw at their base and a 7–8 by 10–12 millimeter blade, and are the same color as the outer petals. Its stamens are 0.8 millimeters long. Its smooth fruit are 4–5 centimeters (1.6–2.0 in) in diameter. Its seeds are 15 by 7 millimeters.

=== Reproductive biology ===
The pollen of M. globiflora is shed as permanent tetrads.

== Habitat and distribution ==
It has been observed growing in sandy soils in sparse mountain forests, at elevations from 1,700 to 2,000 meters (5,600 to 6,600 ft).
