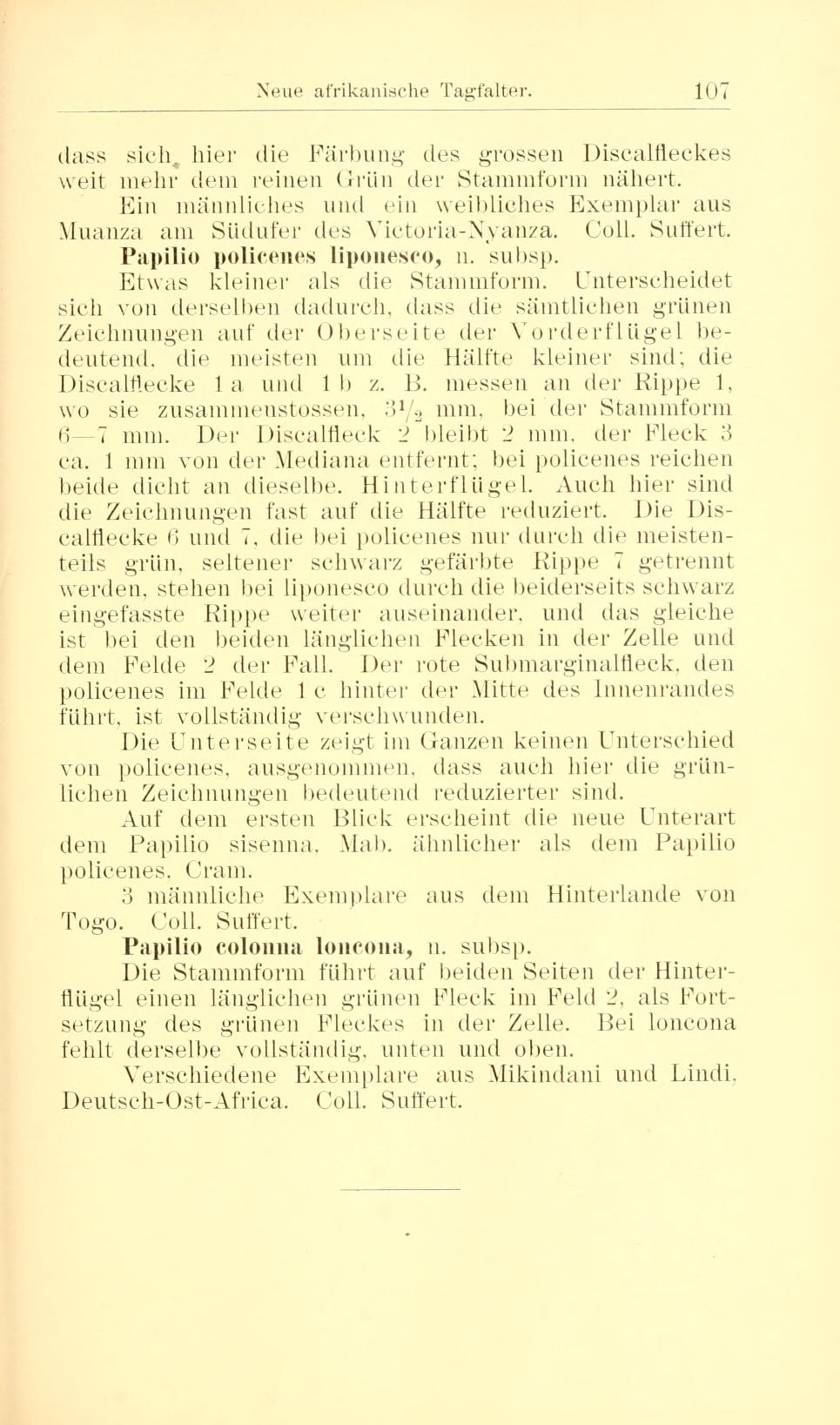
- original description

Scientific classification
- Kingdom: Animalia
- Phylum: Arthropoda
- Clade: Pancrustacea
- Class: Insecta
- Order: Lepidoptera
- Family: Papilionidae
- Genus: Graphium
- Species: G. liponesco

Binomial name
- Graphium liponesco (Suffert, 1904)).

Synonyms
- Papilio policenes liponesco Suffert, 1904; Graphium (Arisbe) liponesco; Papilio boolae Strand, 1909

= Graphium liponesco =

Species of butterfly

Graphium liponesco, the long-tailed striped swordtail, is a butterfly in the family Papilionidae. It is found in Guinea, Sierra Leone, Ivory Coast, Ghana, Togo and western Nigeria. Its habitat consists of wet and moist forests in good condition. It is very similar to Graphium policenoides and Graphium policenes

== Taxonomy ==
It is a member of the Graphium policenes-clade (policenes, Graphium liponesco, Graphium biokoensis, Graphium policenoides, Graphium porthaon.)
