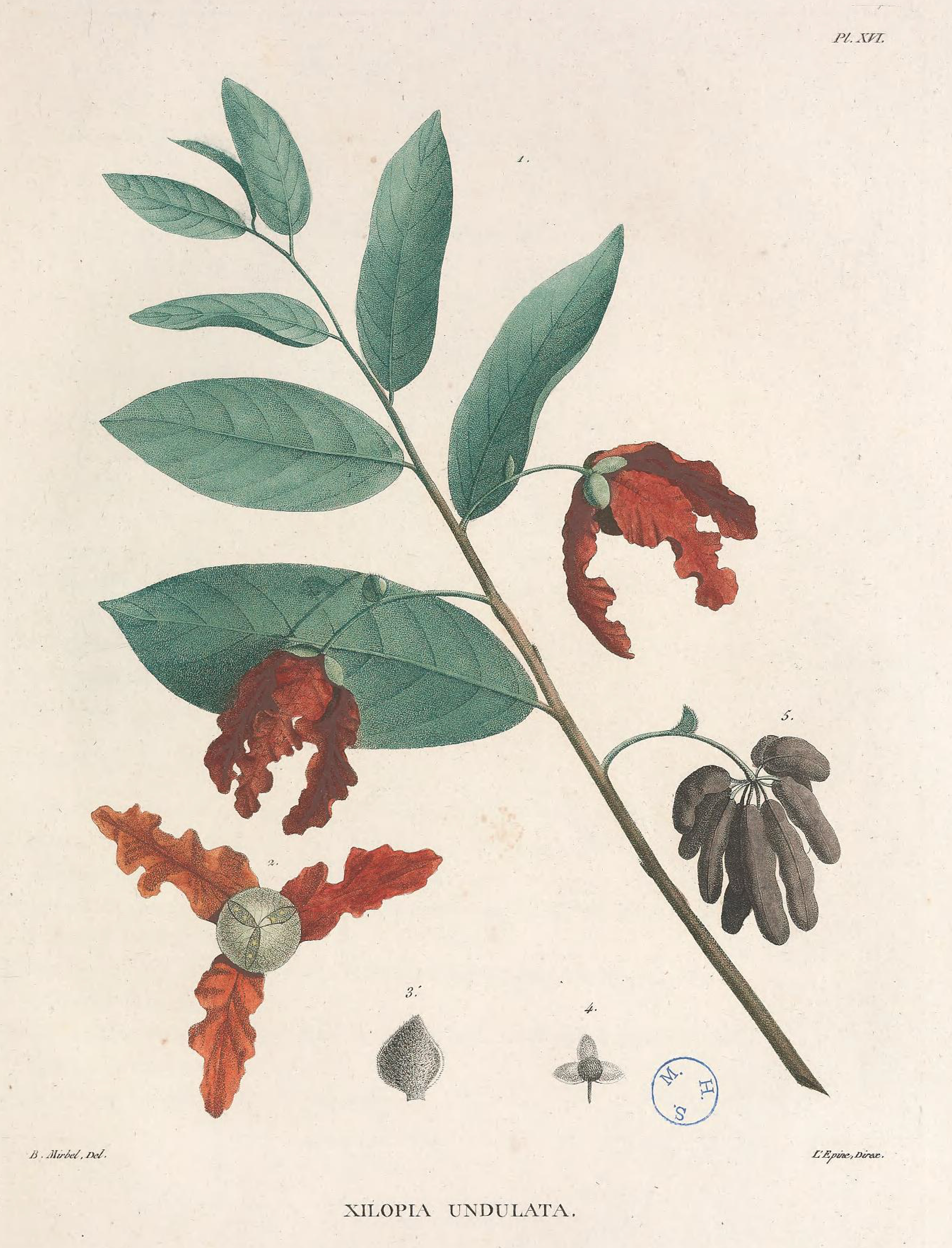
- Botanical illustration of Monodora undulata (using the synonym Xylopia undulata)

Conservation status
- Least Concern (IUCN 3.1)

Scientific classification
- Kingdom: Plantae
- Clade: Embryophytes
- Clade: Tracheophytes
- Clade: Spermatophytes
- Clade: Angiosperms
- Clade: Magnoliids
- Order: Magnoliales
- Family: Annonaceae
- Genus: Monodora
- Species: M. undulata

Binomial name
- Monodora undulata (P.Beauv.) Couvreur

Synonyms
- Habzelia undulata (P.Beauv.) A.DC. Monodora brevipes Benth. Monodora grandiflora Benth. Monodora preussii Engl. & Diels; Unona undulata P.Beauv.) Dunal; Xylopia undulata P.Beauv.

= Monodora undulata =

Species of plant in the soursop family

Monodora undulata is a species of plant in the family Annonaceae. It is native to Cameroon, the Central African Republic, Ghana, Guinea, Ivory Coast, Liberia, Nigeria and Sierra Leone. Palisot de Beauvois the botanist and entomologist who first formally described the species using the basionym Xylopia undulata, named it after the wavy (undulātus, in Latin) margins of its petals.

== Description ==
It is a tree reaching 20 meters (66 ft) in height. Its mature leathery leaves are 10–40 by 8–13 centimeters and come to a point at their tips. The leaves are smooth on their upper and lower surfaces. Its petioles are 5–10 millimeters long. Its pendulous flowers are solitary. Each flower is on a pedicel 30–55 millimeters long. Its flowers have 3 oval-shaped sepals that are 7–11 by 5–10 millimeters. The sepals are green and smooth on both sides with wavy margins and are arched backwards when mature. Its 6 petals are arranged in two rows of 3. The outer petals are white with yellow and purple highlights, 3–4.5 by 1.5–3.0 centimeters, and have very wavy margins. The outer petals are smooth on both sides. The inner petals are yellow with purple spots with margins that touch one another. The inner petals have a 2.-5 millimeter wide claw at their base and a 2–2.7 by 1.5–2 centimeter blade. The inner petals are smooth on their outer surface, and have 2–2.5 millimeter hairs on their inner surface. It has 12–14 rows of stamens that are 1 millimeter long. Its ovoid fruit are 6–12 by 4–6 centimeters and brown and smooth. Its seeds are 9–20 by 6–11 millimeters.

=== Reproductive biology ===
The pollen of M. undulata is shed as permanent tetrads.

== Habitat and distribution ==
It has been observed growing in swampy terrain and along rivers, in rain forests, at elevations of 0–700 meters (0–2,297 ft).
