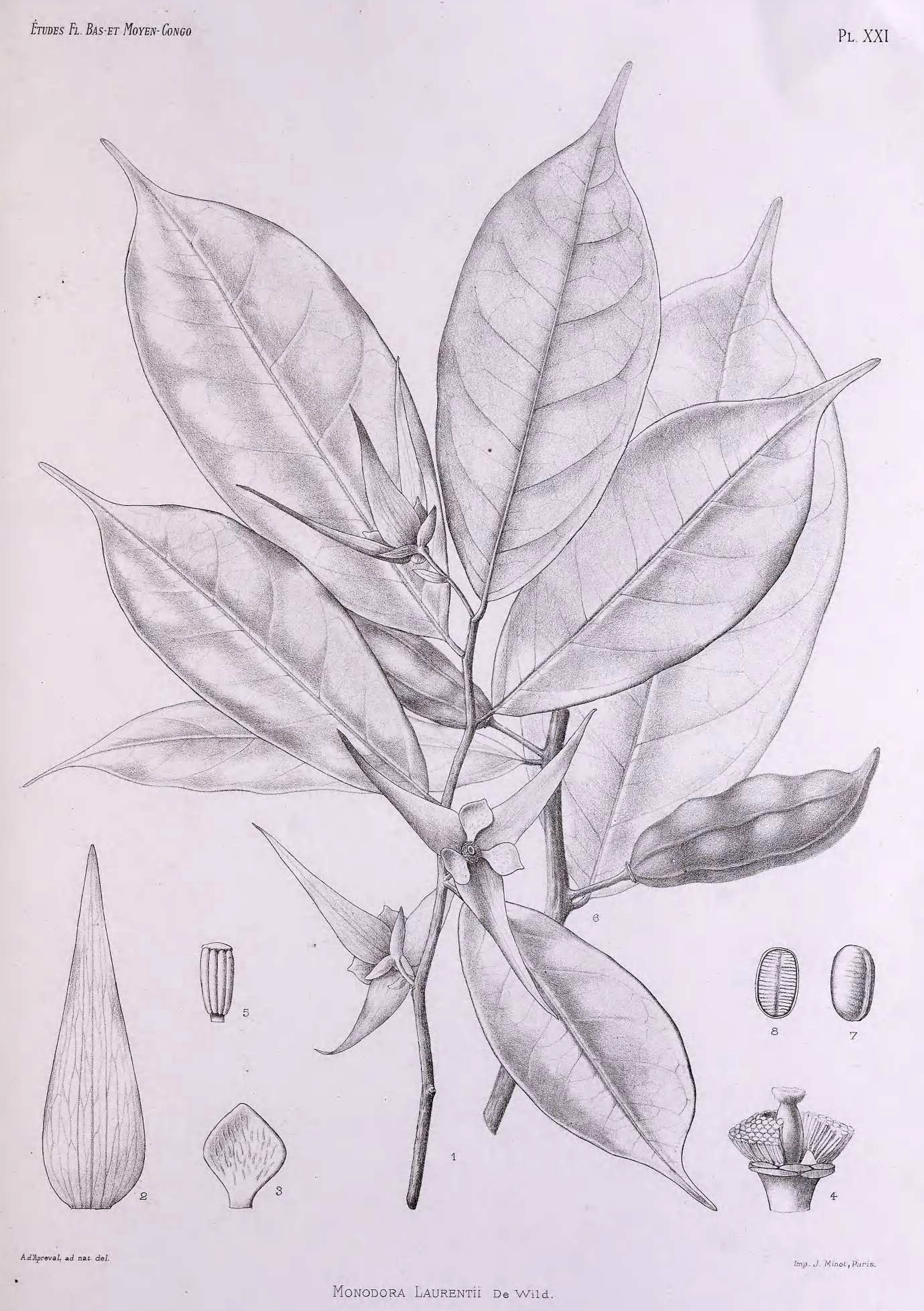
- Botanical illustration of a Monodora laurentii

Conservation status
- Least Concern (IUCN 3.1)

Scientific classification
- Kingdom: Plantae
- Clade: Embryophytes
- Clade: Tracheophytes
- Clade: Spermatophytes
- Clade: Angiosperms
- Clade: Magnoliids
- Order: Magnoliales
- Family: Annonaceae
- Genus: Monodora
- Species: M. laurentii

Binomial name
- Monodora laurentii De Wild.

= Monodora laurentii =

Species of plant in the soursop family

Monodora laurentii is a species of plant in the family Annonaceae. It is native to the Democratic Republic of the Congo, Gabon, and the Republic of the Congo. Émile De Wildeman, the Belgian botanist who first formally described the species, named it after Marcel Laurent, the Belgian botanist who collected many plant specimens in the regions along the Congo River.

== Description ==
It is a tree reaching 4 meters (13 ft) in height. Its young and mature branches are hairless. Its hairless, papery to leathery, oval leaves are 12–14 by 3.5–4.5 centimeters (4.7–5.5 by 1.4–1.8 in). The tips of the leaves taper to a blunt tip, and the tapered portion is 15–20 millimeters long. The leaf bases are blunt to pointed. The leaves have 6–10 pairs of secondary veins emanating from their midribs. Its hairless petioles are 5–7 by 1–1.5 millimeters and have a groove on their upper surface. It has solitary flowers, positioned opposite from leaves, that hang down. Each flower is born on a hairless pedicel that 15–20 by 0.8 millimeters. The pedicels have a hairless, elliptical bract that is 9–10 by 4 millimeters. The base of the bract partially wraps the pedicel and its tip is pointed. It has 3 oblong, hairless, green sepals are 8–10 by 3 millimeters. The sepals have flat bases, pointed tips and straight edges. Its flowers have 6 petals in two rows of three. The outer petals are white to light pink with yellow and green streaks. The, hairless, oval outer petals are 35–50 by 9–12 millimeters. The outer petals have heart-shaped bases, pointed tips and straight margins. The diamond-shaped inner petals are 8–9 by 10–12 millimeters. The inner petals have wedge-shaped bases and pointed tips. The edges of the inner petals are straight and touch one another. The upper surface of the inner leaves have ribbon-like hairs while the lower surface is hairless. The inner petals have a hairless, basal claw below the blade that is 2 by 3 millimeters. Its flowers have 6–7 rows of stamen that are 0.7 millimeters long. The stamen filaments extend above the anthers to form a shield. Its carpels are fused forming an ovary wall that is 2 by 1.5 millimeters. Its hairless stigma are 1.5 millimeters in diameter. The fruit are born on a hairless, pedicels that are 15–20 by 5 millimeters. The purple, hairless, cone-shaped fruit are 4.5–6.5 by 2–2.5 centimeters with a pointed tip that is 5 millimeters long. The fruit are smooth with 5–6 ribs. The fruit have elliptical, smooth, dark brown seeds that are 12–15 by 10–11 millimeters.

=== Reproductive biology ===
The pollen of M. laurentii is shed as permanent tetrads.

== Habitat and distribution ==
It has been observed growing in lowland rain forests at elevations from 400 to 500 meters (1,300 to 1,600 ft).
