= Graphium biokoensis =

Scientific classification
- Kingdom: Animalia
- Phylum: Arthropoda
- Clade: Pancrustacea
- Class: Insecta
- Order: Lepidoptera
- Family: Papilionidae
- Genus: Graphium
- Species: G. biokoensis

Binomial name
- Graphium biokoensis (Gauthier, 1984)

Synonyms
- Papilio policenes biokoensis Gauthier, 1984; Graphium (Arisbe) biokoensis; Papilio nigrescens ab. intermedia Birket-Smith, 1960

Species of butterfly

Graphium biokoensis, the Gauthier's striped swordtail, is a butterfly in the family Papilionidae (swallowtails). It is found in eastern Nigeria, Equatorial Guinea, Bioko, Cameroon, Gabon, the Republic of the Congo, the eastern part of the Democratic Republic of the Congo and Burundi. Its habitat consists of forests.

== Taxonomy ==
It is a member of the Graphium policenes-clade (policenes, Graphium liponesco, Graphium biokoensis, Graphium policenoides, Graphium porthaon.). biokoensis Gauthier, 1984 is now reinstated as a subspecies of Graphium policenes (Cramer, 1775), localized to Bioko Island.
