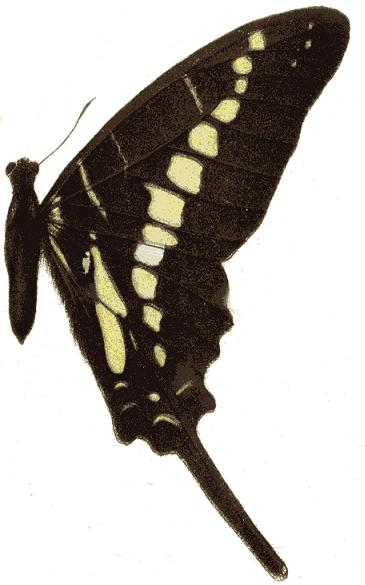
- Graphium policenoides forma nigrescens

Scientific classification
- Kingdom: Animalia
- Phylum: Arthropoda
- Clade: Pancrustacea
- Class: Insecta
- Order: Lepidoptera
- Family: Papilionidae
- Genus: Graphium
- Species: G. policenoides

Binomial name
- Graphium policenoides (Holland, 1892)

Synonyms
- Papilio policenoides Holland, 1892; Graphium (Arisbe) policenoides; Papilio policines nigrescens Eimer, 1889

= Graphium policenoides =

Species of butterfly

Graphium policenoides is a butterfly in the family Papilionidae (swallowtails). It is found in Cameroon, Gabon, the Republic of the Congo and the Democratic Republic of the Congo. Its habitat consists of wet forests in good condition. It is very similar to Graphium policenes and Graphium liponesco

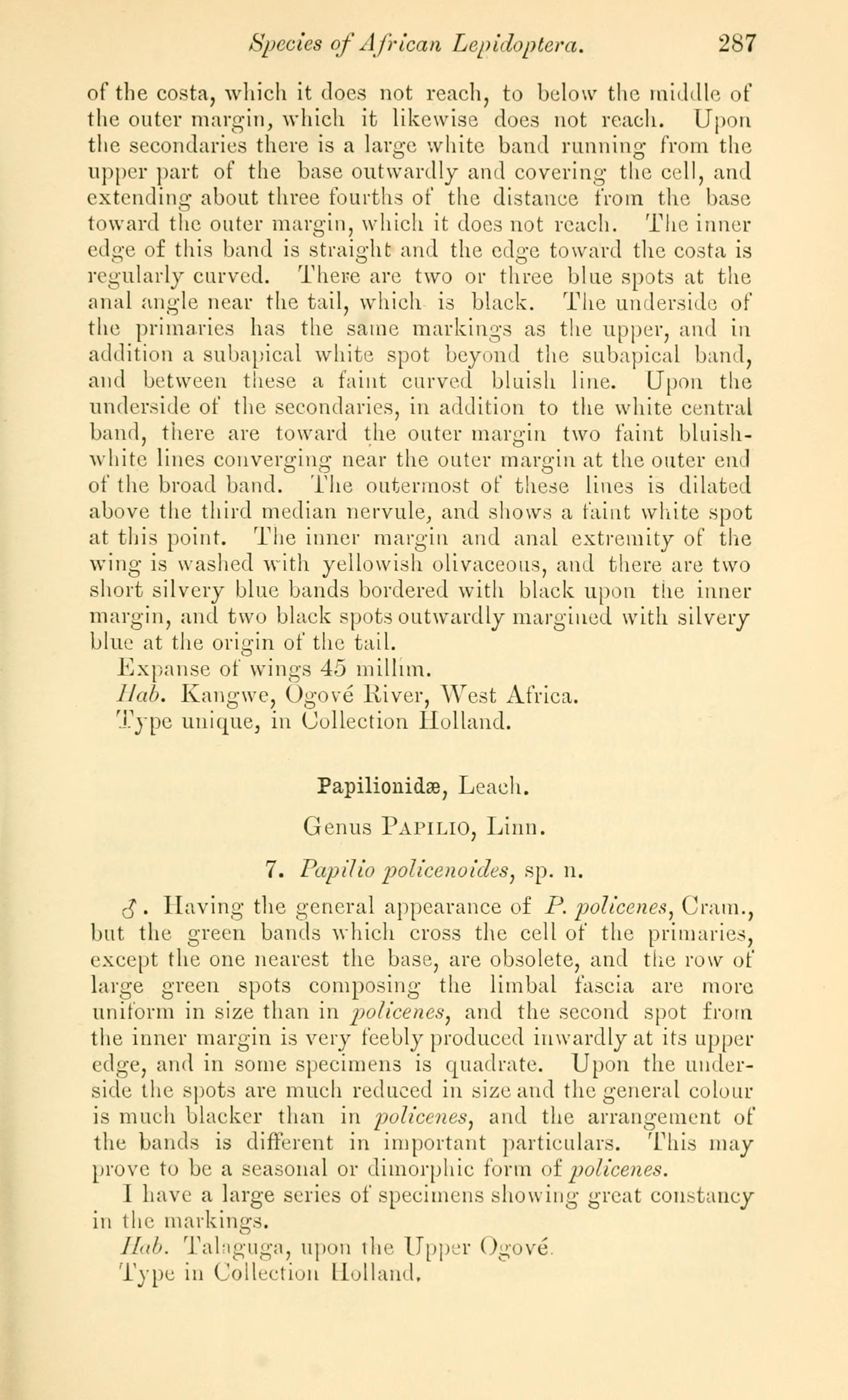
Graphium policenoides Original description Holland

== Taxonomy ==
It is a member of the Graphium policenes-clade (policenes, Graphium liponesco, Graphium biokoensis, Graphium policenoides, Graphium porthaon.)

Aurivillius in Seitz places nigrescens (policenoides), policenes,sisenna (polistratus), polistratus, junodi, porthaon and colonna in the Policenes Group Subgroup 2 circumscribed Hindwing with a long, narrow tail of uniform width at vein 4. Frons black with white lateral margins. Wings above with green or greenish white markings. Cell of the forewing with 5 — 6 transverse bands or spots. Both wings with submarginal spots. Hindwing beneath with a so-called ornamental band, formed of red spots. Besides the markings already mentioned the forewing has a spot at the base of cellules 1 a and 1 b, an oblique transverse streak in the basal part of these cellules and 8 discal spots, one each in cellules 1 a — 6 and 8; the hindwing has a narrow transverse band at the base, a narrow median band which consists only of three spots (in the cell and in cellules 2 and 7) and usually also 7 discal spots in cellules 1 c -7, of 'which, however, that in 1 c is red. The larva has four pairs of spines, one pair each on the 1., 2., 3. and penultimate segments. The pupa is very angularly widened at the beginning of the abdomen and has a long hump on the mesothorax. Subgroup 2.The apical fourth of the cell of the hindwing above unicolorous black without light spot. The cell of the forewing with a light spot or dot at the costal margin close before the apex. External images from Royal Museum of Central Africa.
