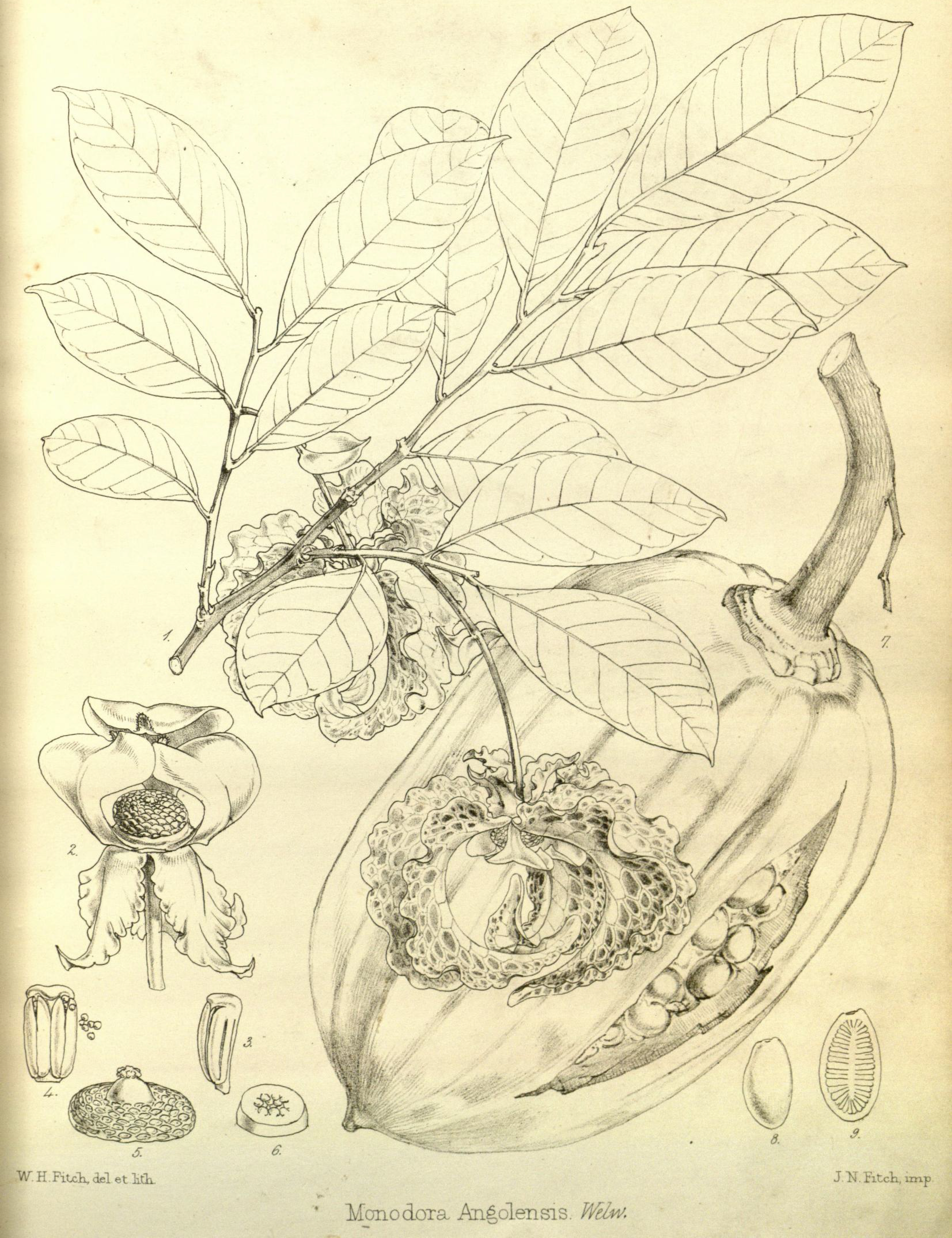
- Scientific illustration of Monodora angolensis

Conservation status
- Least Concern (IUCN 3.1)

Scientific classification
- Kingdom: Plantae
- Clade: Embryophytes
- Clade: Tracheophytes
- Clade: Spermatophytes
- Clade: Angiosperms
- Clade: Magnoliids
- Order: Magnoliales
- Family: Annonaceae
- Genus: Monodora
- Species: M. angolensis

Binomial name
- Monodora angolensis Welw.

Synonyms
- Monodora durieuxii De Wild. Monodora gibsonii Bullock ex Burtt Davy; Monodora letestui Pellegr. Monodora louisii Boutique

= Monodora angolensis =

Species of plant in the soursop family

Monodora angolensis is a species of plant in the family Annonaceae. It is native to Angola, Cameroon, Central African Republic, Democratic Republic of the Congo, Equatorial Guinea, Gabon, Ivory Coast, Nigeria, Republic of the Congo, Sudan, Tanzania, Uganda, Zambia and Zaire. Friedrich Welwitsch, the Austrian botanist who first formally described the species, named it after Angola where he found it growing near the town of Pungo-Andongo.

== Description ==
It is a tree reaching 20 meters (66 ft) in height with grey to black, furrowed bark. Its mature branches are hairless and have lenticels. Its hairless, papery to leathery, oval to elliptical leaves are 4–20 by 2-7.5 centimeters. The tips of the leaves taper to a point and the bases are blunt or wedge-shaped. The leaves have 8–16 pairs of secondary veins emanating from their midribs. Its hairless petioles are 2–10 by 1 millimeters and have a groove on their upper surface. It has solitary flowers, positioned opposite from leaves, that hang down. Each flower is born on a hairless, light green pedicel that is 8–80 by 0.5-0.8. The pedicels have an upper, hairless, oval, green to red-brown bract that is 4–17 by 3-12 millimeters. The base of the bract partially wraps the pedicel and its edges are wavy. It has 3 oval, hairless sepals are 4–15 by 2-6 millimeters. The sepals are green with red and purple speckles. The sepals have flat bases, pointed tips and wavy edges. Its flowers have 6 petals in two rows of three. The outer petals are white at their base, transitioning to reddish brown with yellow spots near their tips. The, hairless, oblong to oval outer petals are 1.7-5.0 by 1.0-3.0 centimeters. The outer petals have flat bases, pointed tips and wavy margins. The heart-shaped to triangular inner petals are 4–11 by 5-16 millimeters and white with purple highlights. The inner petals have flat to heart-shaped bases and pointed to notched tips. The edges of the inner petals are straight and have dense curly hairs near their tips which mesh to form an arch. The inner petals have a basal claw below the blade that is 3–9 by 2-6 millimeters. Its flowers have 9–11 rows of stamen that are 0.7-1 millimeters long. The stamen filaments extend above the anthers to form a shield. Its carpels are fused forming an ovary wall that is 1-1.5 by 0.8 millimeters. Its hairless stigma are 0.9-1.2 millimeters in diameter. The fruit are born on a hairless, woody pedicels that is 2.5-8.5 by 5-7 millimeters. The hairless, oval to round fruit are 3.5-8 by 3.5-5 centimeters with a pointed tip. The fruit are finely wrinkled and green with white spots. The fruit have white pulp with elliptical, smooth seeds that are 9–13 by 5-8 millimeters.

=== Reproductive biology ===
The pollen of M. angolensis is shed as permanent tetrads.

== Habitat and distribution ==
It has been observed growing in a variety of forest types at elevations of 0–1,800 meters (0–5,906 ft).
