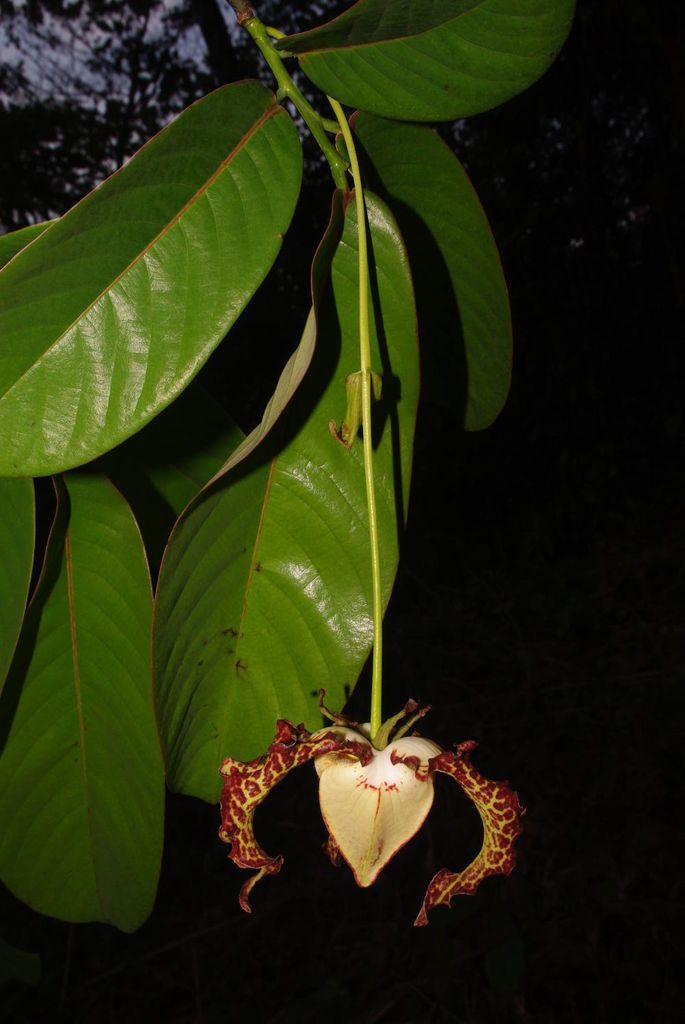
- Monodora myristica

Scientific classification
- Kingdom: Plantae
- Clade: Embryophytes
- Clade: Tracheophytes
- Clade: Spermatophytes
- Clade: Angiosperms
- Clade: Magnoliids
- Order: Magnoliales
- Family: Annonaceae
- Tribe: Monodoreae
- Genus: Monodora; Dunal

= Monodora =

Genus of flowering plants

Monodora is a genus of plant in family Annonaceae. It contains 14 species native to tropical Africa.

== Species ==
14 species are accepted.

- Monodora angolensis Welw.
- Monodora carolinae Couvreur
- Monodora crispata Engl.
- Monodora globiflora Couvreur
- Monodora grandidieri Baill.
- Monodora hastipetala Couvreur
- Monodora junodii Engl. & Diels
- Monodora laurentii De Wild.
- Monodora minor Engl. & Diels
- Monodora myristica (Gaertn.) Dunal; Calabash nutmeg; based on: Annona myristica Gaertn.
- Monodora stenopetala Oliv.
- Monodora tenuifolia Benth.
- Monodora undulata (P.Beauv.) Couvreur
- Monodora zenkeri Engl.
