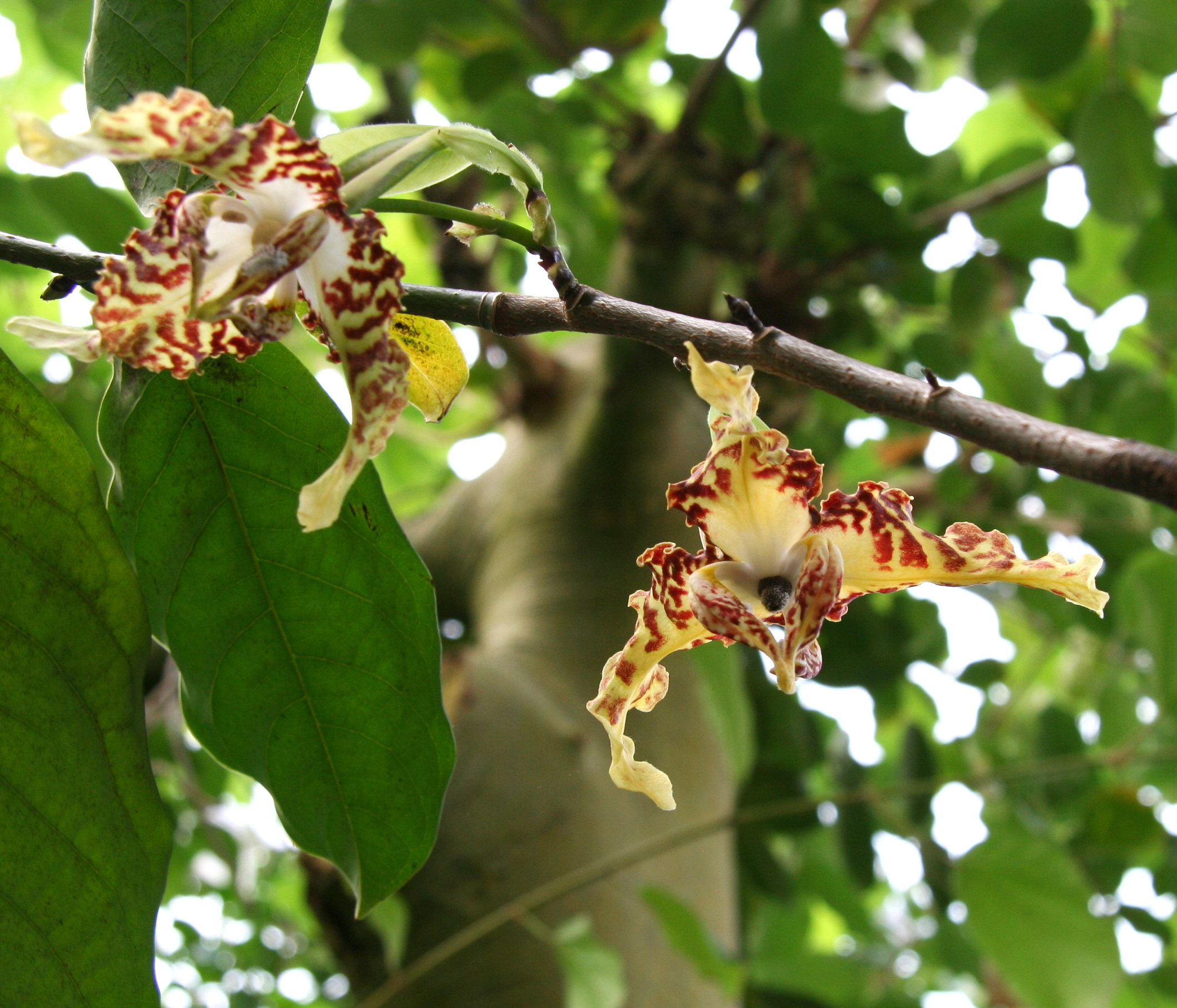

Conservation status
- Least Concern (IUCN 3.1)

Scientific classification
- Kingdom: Plantae
- Clade: Embryophytes
- Clade: Tracheophytes
- Clade: Spermatophytes
- Clade: Angiosperms
- Clade: Magnoliids
- Order: Magnoliales
- Family: Annonaceae
- Genus: Monodora
- Species: M. tenuifolia

Binomial name
- Monodora tenuifolia Benth.

Synonyms
- Monodora cabrae De Wild.; Monodora tenuifolia var. schlechteri Engl.

= Monodora tenuifolia =

Species of plant in the soursop family

Monodora tenuifolia is a species of plant in the family Annonaceae. It is native to equatorial Africa. George Bentham, the English botanist who first formally described the species, named it after its slender (tenui- in Latin) leaves (-folia in Latin).

== Description ==
It is a tree reaching 30 meters (98 ft) in height with dark grey to green bark. Its trunk and branches can have white lenticels. Its hairless, papery to leathery, elliptical to oval leaves are 6–21 by 2–7.5 centimeters. The tips of the leaves taper to a point, and the tapered portion is 5-10 millimeters long. The leaf bases wedge-shaped. The leaves are green on their upper surface and paler green on their lower surface. The leaves have 9–15 pairs of secondary veins emanating from their midribs. Its hairless petioles are 2–7 by 1-2 millimeters and have a groove on their upper surface. It has solitary flowers, positioned opposite from leaves, that hang down. Each flower is born on a light green, hairless pedicel that is 25–75 by 1-1.5 millimeters. The pedicels have an oval bract that is 55–60 by 10-30 millimeters. The base of the bract partially wraps the pedicel and its tip is rounded. The bracts are light green with red highlights at the tips and have wavy edges. The upper and lower faces of the bract are hairless, but the edges have short hairs. It has 3 oval, hairless, sepals are 10–35 by 4-16 millimeters. The sepals are green with red highlights. The sepals have flat bases, rounded to gradually narrowing tips and wavy edges. Its flowers have 6 petals in two rows of three. The outer petals are yellow-green with red-brown streaks. The hairless, oval outer petals are 30–90 by 25-30 millimeters. The outer petals have flat bases, rounded to pointed tips and very wavy margins. The hairless inner petals are 10–35 by 6-10 millimeters. The inner petals are white to green and streaked with reddish brown highlights. The inner petals have wedge-shaped bases and rounded to pointed tips. The inner petals have two distinctive hairy appendages that are 3-5 millimeters in length, positioned halfway up either margin. The inner petals have a basal claw below the blade. Its flowers have 10–13 rows of yellowish white stamen that are 0.8-1 millimeters long. The stamen filaments extend above the anthers to form a shield. Its carpels are fused forming an ovary wall that is 2–3 by 1.5 millimeters. Its green, hairless stigma are 2 millimeters in diameter. The fruit are born on a hairless, woody pedicels that are 3–7 by 3-4 millimeters. The hairless, round fruit are 4–7 by 4.5-7 centimeters. The fruit are green with light spots, smooth and covered in a distinctive grey-blue wax. The fruit have white pulp, and elliptical, smooth, light brown seeds that are 12–17 by 10-13 millimeters.

=== Reproductive biology ===
The pollen is shed as permanent tetrads. Field observations suggest that it is pollinated by flies.

== Habitat and distribution ==
It has been observed growing in sandy soil in evergreen rain forests, gallery forests, deciduous forests, and savanna-like habitats at elevations of 0–800 meters (0–2,625 ft).

== Uses ==
Its seeds have been reported to be used as a supplemental food source, but it has questionable dietary value and is particularly low in lysine. It is used as a traditional medicine, a fiber and wood source, and as an ornamental.
