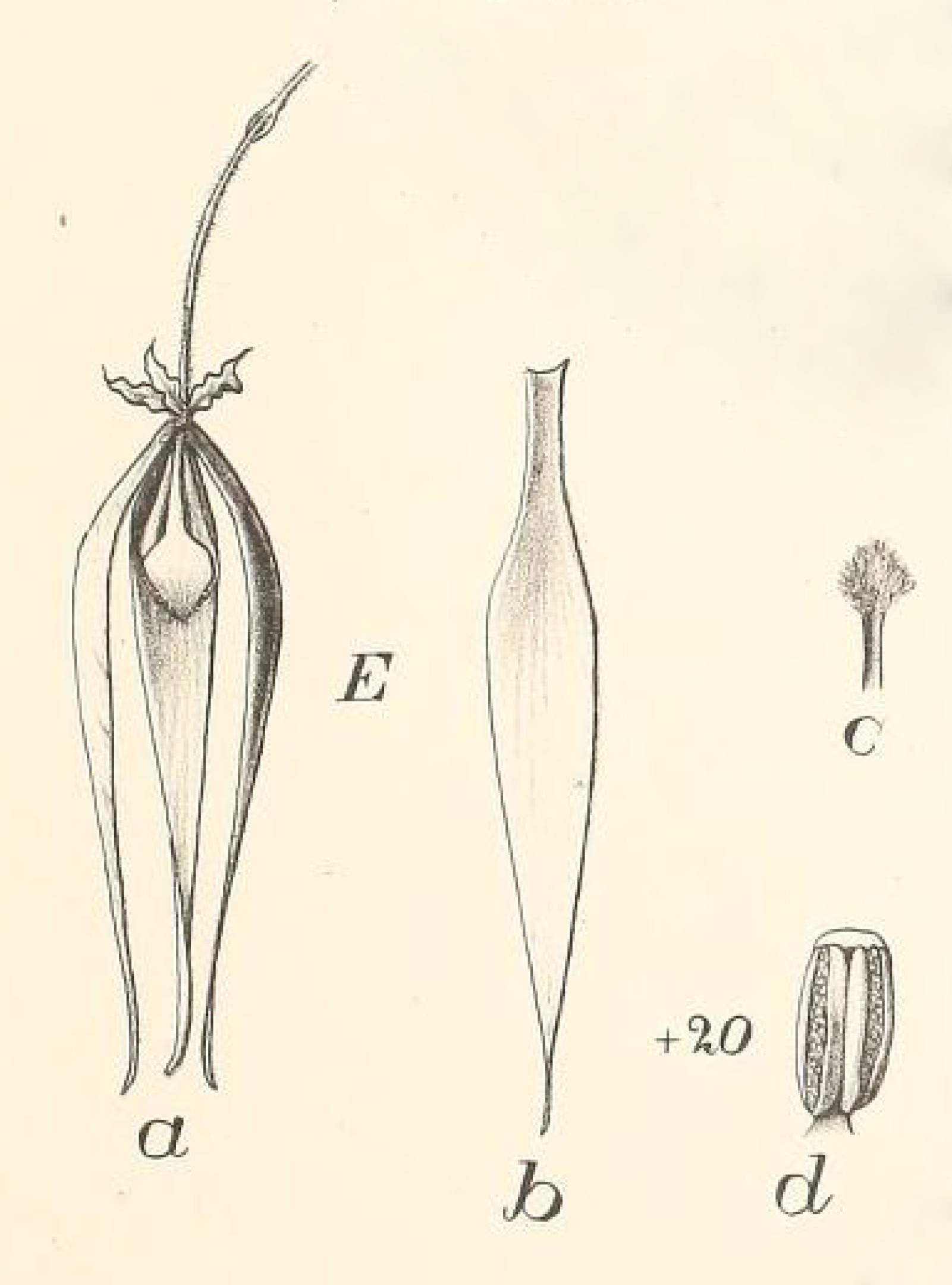
- Botanical illustration of a Monodora stenopetala flower and floral parts

Conservation status
- Vulnerable (IUCN 3.1)

Scientific classification
- Kingdom: Plantae
- Clade: Embryophytes
- Clade: Tracheophytes
- Clade: Spermatophytes
- Clade: Angiosperms
- Clade: Magnoliids
- Order: Magnoliales
- Family: Annonaceae
- Genus: Monodora
- Species: M. stenopetala

Binomial name
- Monodora stenopetala Oliv.

= Monodora stenopetala =

Species of plant in the soursop family

Monodora stenopetala is a species of plant in the family Annonaceae. It is native to Malawi and Mozambique. Daniel Oliver, the English botanist who first formally described the species, named it after its narrow (Latinized form of Greek στενος, stenos) petals.

== Description ==
It is a bush or small tree. Its leaves are 8.5–11 by 3–4.2 centimeters (3.3–4.3 by 1.2–1.7 in) and rounded at their tips. The leaves are lightly hairy on their upper and lower surfaces. Its petioles are 3–4 millimeters long. Its solitary flowers are extra-axillary. Each flower is on a pedicel 1–1.6 centimeters long. Its flowers have 3 oblong sepals that are 4–5 millimeters long. The sepals are smooth, curved backwards, and have wavy or fringed margins. Its 6 petals are arranged in two rows of 3. The outer petals are yellow, 3.5–5 by 0.2–0.4 centimeters, and smooth or lightly hairy. The inner petals are similarly colored. The inner petals have a 0.3–0.7 centimeter long claw at their base and a 0.2–0.4 by 0.35–0.5 centimeter blade. The inner petals are smooth on their outer surface, and hairy inside. Its stamens that are 0.35 millimeters long. Its fruit are 6 by 4 centimeters smooth ellipsoids. Its smooth yellow-brown seeds are 1.5–2 centimeters long.

=== Reproductive biology ===
The pollen of M. stenopetala is shed as permanent tetrads.

== Habitat and distribution ==
It has been observed growing in dense thickets and woodslands at elevations from 100 to 500 meters (330 to 1,640 ft).

== Uses ==
It has been reported to be used in Mozambique as a traditional medicine.
