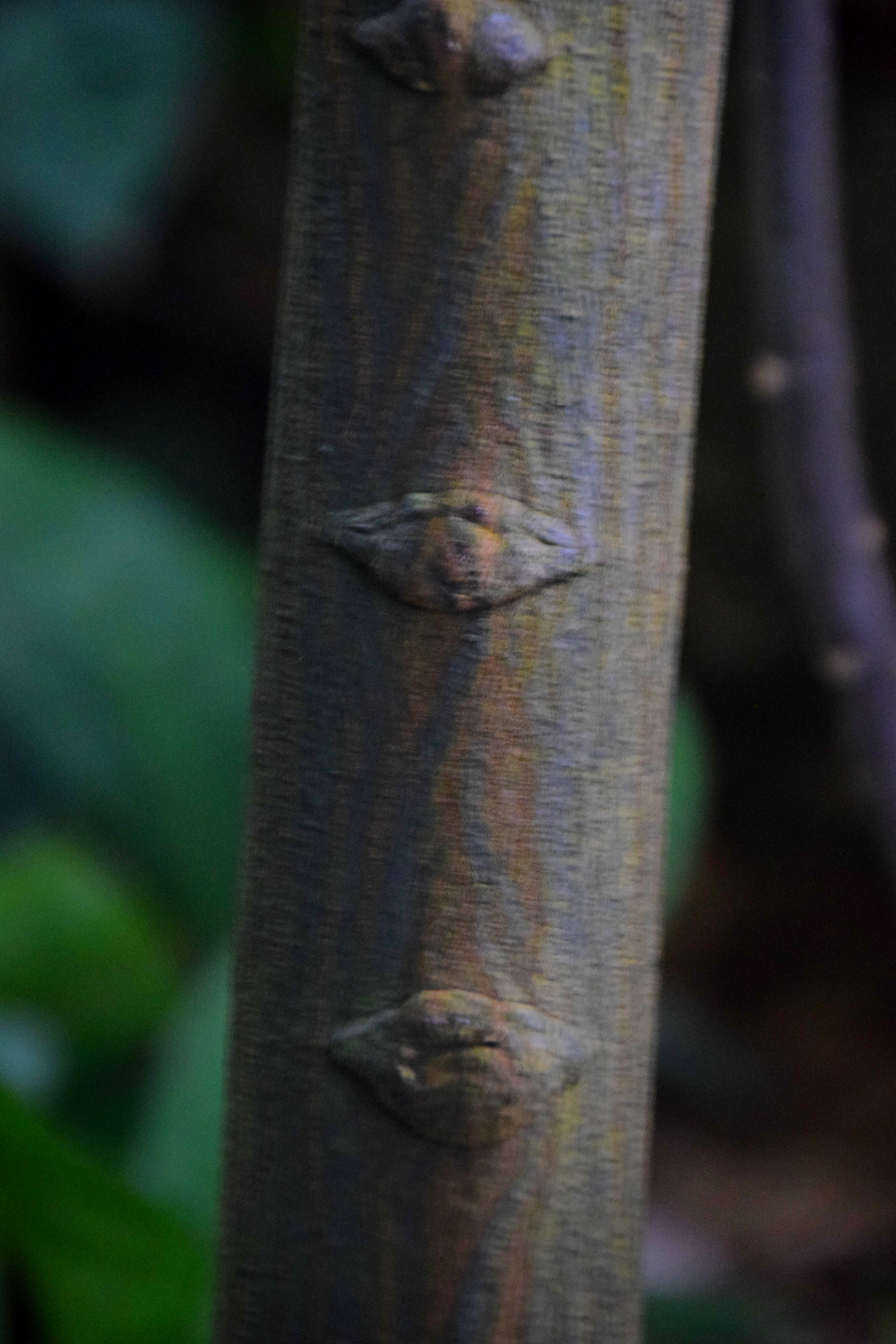

Conservation status
- Least Concern (IUCN 3.1)

Scientific classification
- Kingdom: Plantae
- Clade: Tracheophytes
- Clade: Angiosperms
- Clade: Magnoliids
- Order: Magnoliales
- Family: Annonaceae
- Genus: Monodora
- Species: M. crispata

Binomial name
- Monodora crispata Engl.

Synonyms
- Monodora crispata var. klaineana Engl.

= Monodora crispata =

Species of plant in the soursop family

Monodora crispata is a species of plant in the family Annonaceae. It is native to western and central Africa (Cameroon, Equatorial Guinea, Gabon, Ghana, Guinea, Ivory Coast, Liberia, Nigeria, and Sierra Leone). Heinrich Gustav Adolf Engler, the German botanist who first formally described the species, named it after its curled (crispatus in Latin) petal margins.

== Description ==
It is a tree reaching 20 meters in height with dark brown bark with lenticels. Its hairless, dark green, membranous to leathery, oval to elliptical leaves are 5-17 by 2.5-6 centimeters. The tips of the leaves taper to a point and the bases are rounded or pointed. The leaves have 9-13 pairs of secondary veins emanating from their midribs. Its petioles are 3-7 by 1-1.5 millimeters and have a groove on their upper surface. It has solitary flowers, positioned opposite from leaves, that hang down. Each flower is born on a hairless, dark green pedicel that is 20-50 by 0.9-0.7 millimeters. The pedicels have an upper, hairless, oval, green bract that is 6-15 by 5-9 millimeters. The base of the bract runs down the pedicel, its tip is pointed, and its edges are wavy. It has 3 oval, green, hairless sepals are 5-18 by 3-6 millimeters. The sepals have flat bases, pointed tips and wavy edges. Its flowers have 6 petals in two rows of three. The outer petals are white at their base, transitioning to yellow with red-brown highlights near their tips. The, hairless, oblong outer petals are 35-70 by 6-20 millimeters. The outer petals have flat bases, tapering tips and strikingly curled margins for which the species is named. The heart-shaped to triangular inner petals are 4-17 by 6-20 millimeters and white to yellow with red highlights near the margins. The inner petals have heart-shaped bases and pointed tips. The edges of the inner petals touch one another and are curled. The faces of the inner petals are covered in short, straight hairs, and their margins have short curly hairs. The inner petals have a basal, hairless, bright yellow claw below the blade that is 3-8 by 1-3 millimeters. Its flowers have 9-11 rows of stamen that are 0.5-1 millimeters long. The stamen filaments extend above the anthers to form a shield. Its carpels are fused forming an ovary wall that is 1.5 millimeters wide. Its hairless stigma are 1.5-2 millimeters in diameter. The fruit are born on hairless, woody pedicels that are 3-5 by 4-10 millimeters. The hairless, conic fruit are 6-15 by 3.5-5 centimeters with a pointed tip. The fruit have 6–7 prominent ribs and green-grey. The fruit have white pulp with elliptical, smooth, light brown seeds that are 10-13 by 5-9 millimeters.

== Reproductive biology ==
Due to its classification, Monodora crispata is an angiosperm in the phylum magnoliophyta. This means that this tree has a specific pattern or reproduction. There are four flower parts that are essential to the reproduction of this plant. These parts are sepals, petals, stamen and carpels. Monodora crispata is a monecious plant meaning that it has both female and male reproductive parts on the same individual. Therefore, each flower has both stamen and a carpel. Angiosperms reproduce through micro and mega spores which then form into micro and mega gametes. The microgamete travels out of the stamen into the carpel to meet with the mega gamete. This is where fertilization happens, and fruit is born.

The pollen of M. crispata is shed as permanent tetrads.

== Habitat and distribution ==
It has been observed growing in sandy soils in secondary rain forests and along streams, at elevations of 0–400 meters (0–1,312 ft).

== Uses ==
It is grown as an ornamental tree. Its wood is used in construction and its seeds have aromatic qualities. There is emerging research about the leaf composition of this tree and other members of the Monodora group. Many close relatives have been researched and found to have medicinal properties, but Monodora crispata does not have many chemicals isolated from it yet. The newest isolated compound from these leaves is (-)-xylopinine.
