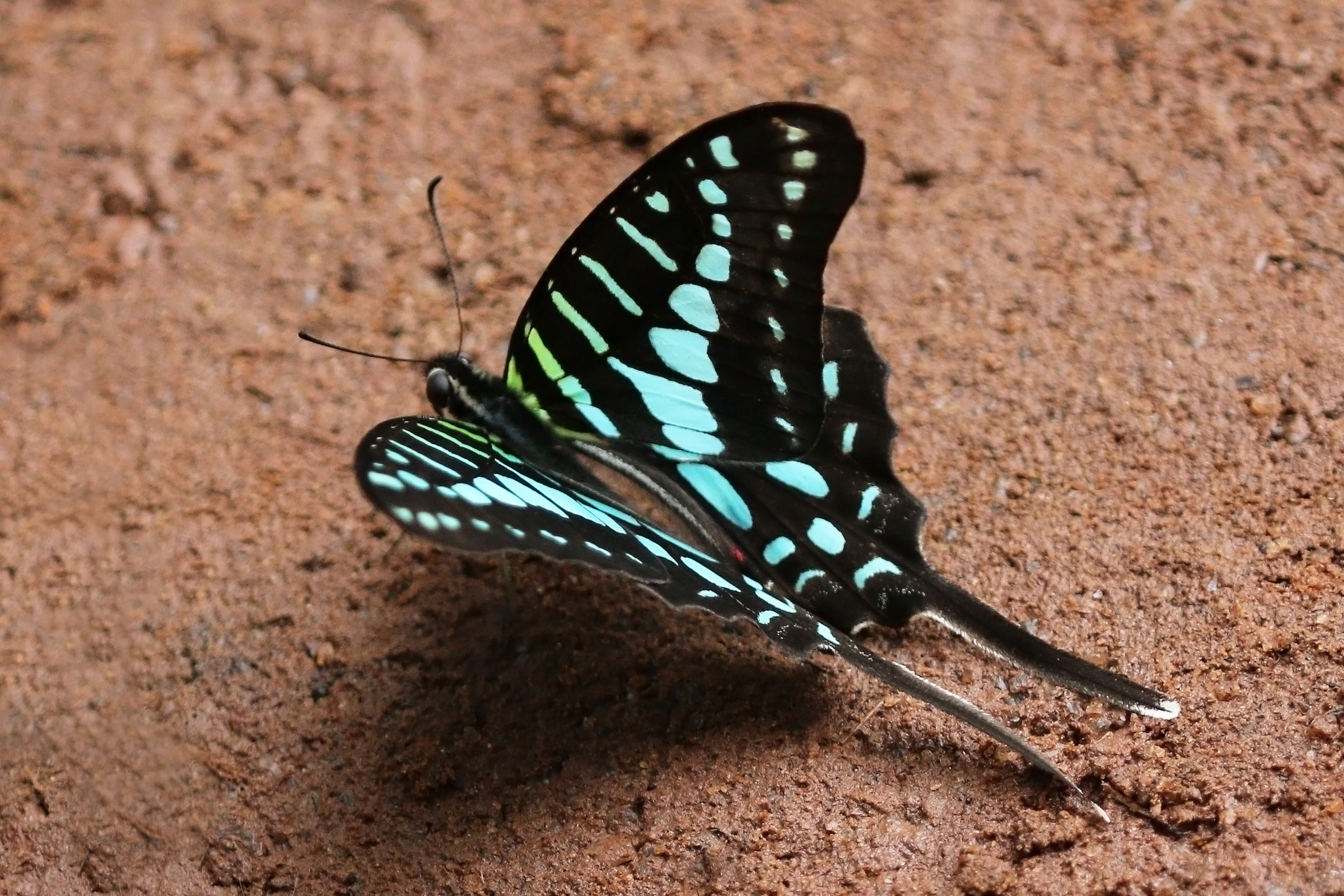

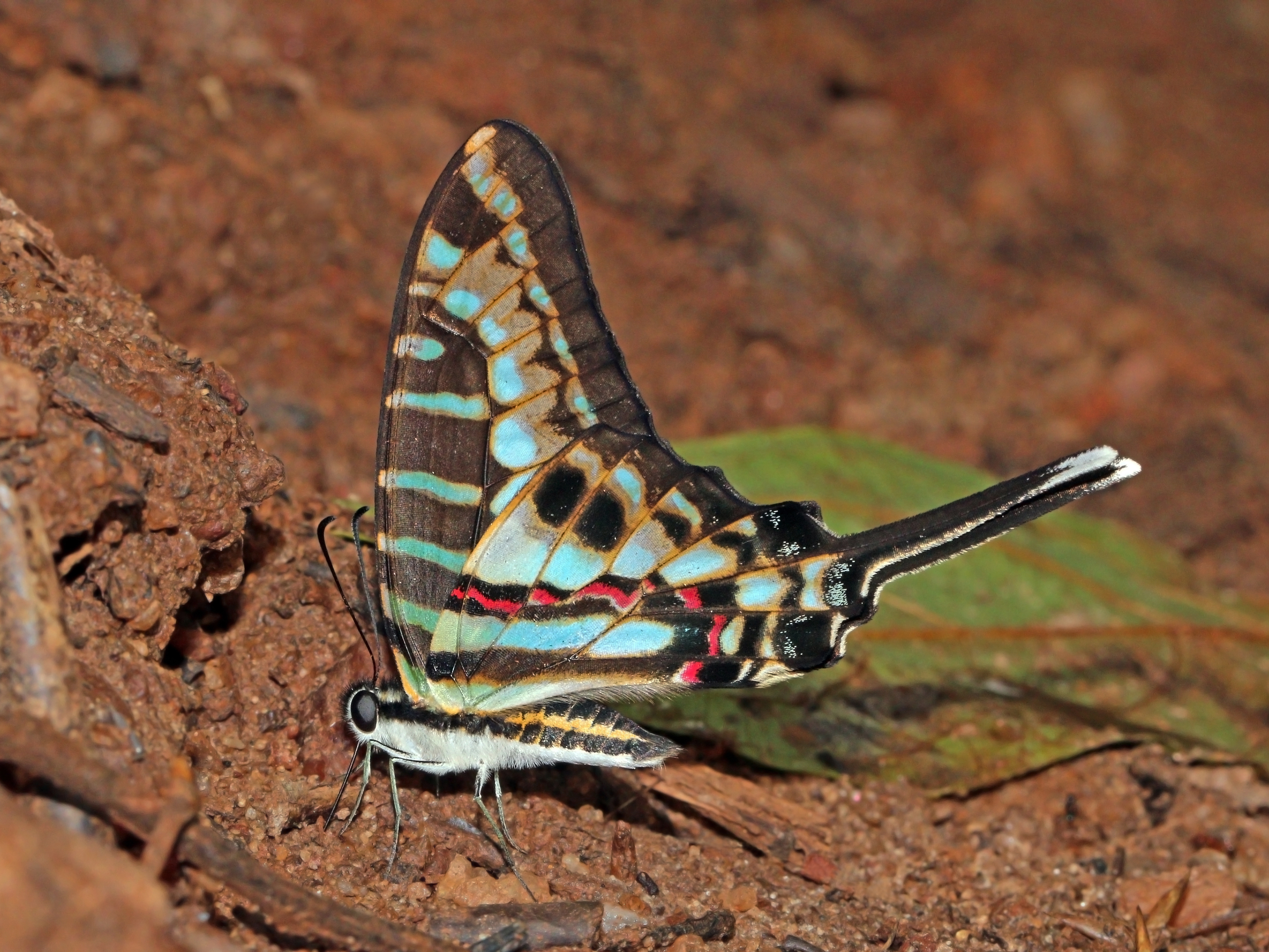
- Two males; Bobiri Forest, Ghana

Scientific classification
- Kingdom: Animalia
- Phylum: Arthropoda
- Clade: Pancrustacea
- Class: Insecta
- Order: Lepidoptera
- Family: Papilionidae
- Genus: Graphium
- Species: G. policenes

Binomial name
- Graphium policenes (Cramer, [1775])

Subspecies
- See text

Synonyms
- Papilio policenes Cramer, 1775; Papilio pompilius Herbst, 1788; Papilio agapenor Fabricius, 1793; Papilio scipio Palisot de Beauvois, 1805; Papilio polixenus Godart, 1819; Papilio policenes laurentia Le Cerf, 1924; Papilio (Cosmodesmus) policenes policenes f. guineensis Dufrane, 1946; Graphium policenes f. coussementi Berger, 1960

= Graphium policenes =

Small striped swordtail

Species of butterfly

Graphium policenes, the common swordtail or small striped swordtail, is a species of butterfly in the family Papilionidae (swallowtails). It is found in tropical Africa.

The wingspan is 55–60 mm in males and 60–65 mm in females. The species has continuous broods during warmer months.

The larvae feed on Uvaria caffra, Artabotrys monteiroae, Uvaria bukobensis, Uvara chamae, Landolphia buchannani, Landolphia ugandensis, Polyalthia species, Annona reticulata, Annona senegalensis, Annona squamosa, and Monanthotaxis caffra.

== Subspecies ==
- Graphium policenes policenes (Sub-Saharan Africa)
- Graphium policenes telloi Hecq, 1999 (Nigeria, northern Cameroon, Central African Republic, southern Sudan)

Torben Larsen developed a species numbering system for his 2005 publication Butterflies of West Africa. The nominate subspecies is #31. The 'Larsen' numbers have since been used with permission in A Sharp Eye on Butterflies of Ghana.

== Gallery ==
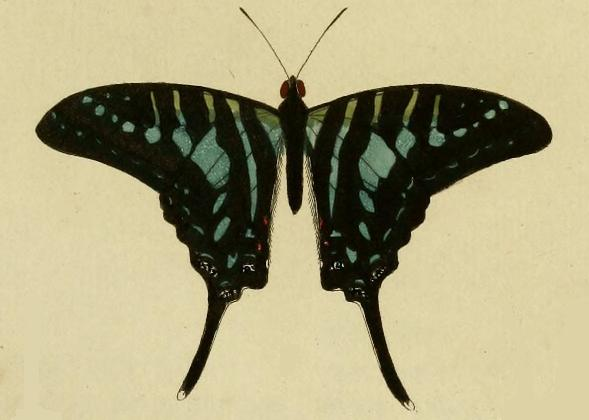
Dorsal view, from Papillions exotiques (1779)

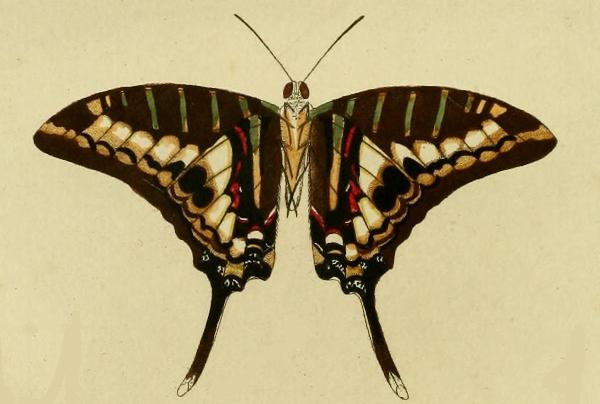
Ventral view

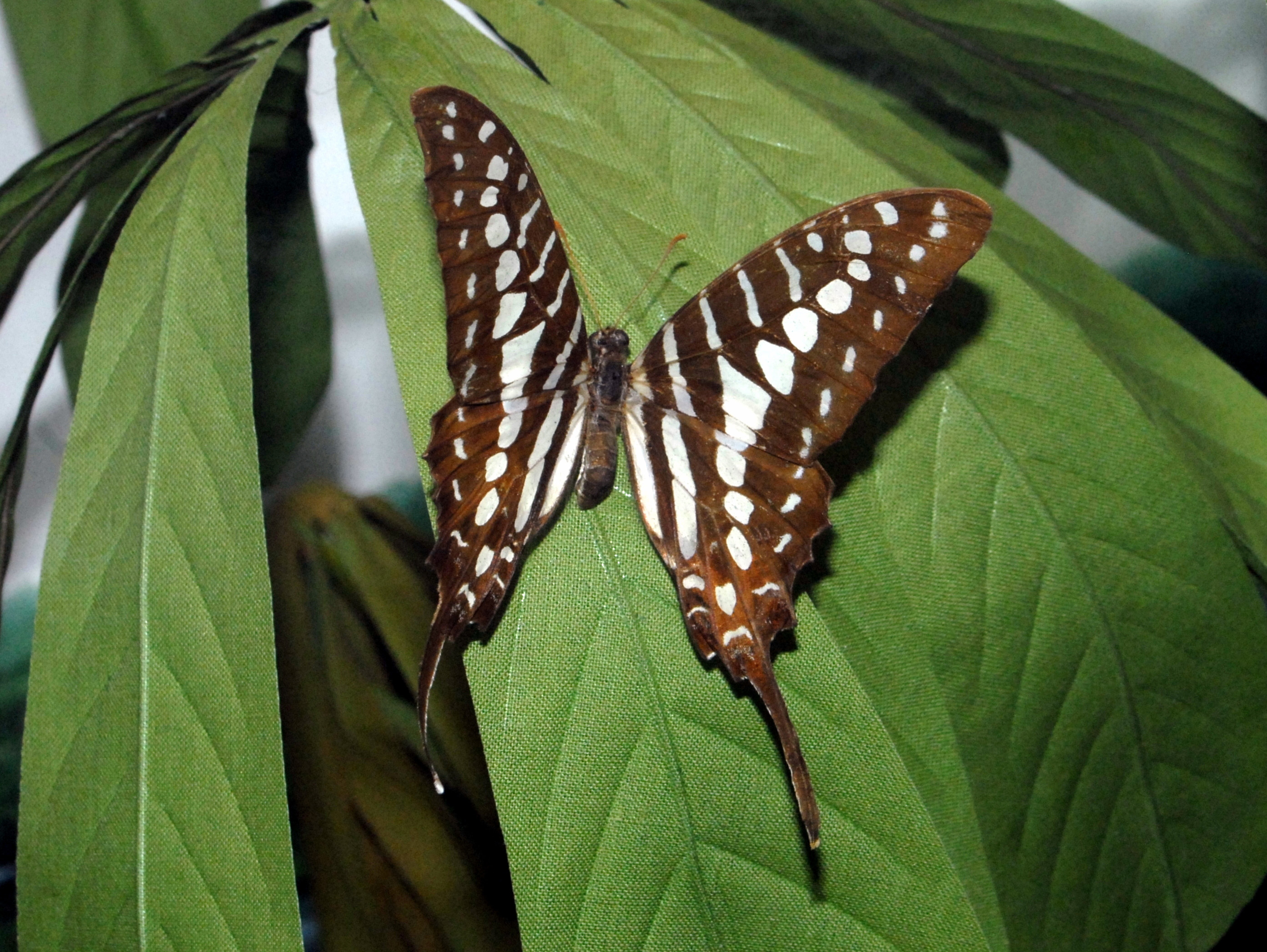
Mounted specimen, at the Museo Civico di Storia Naturale di Milano

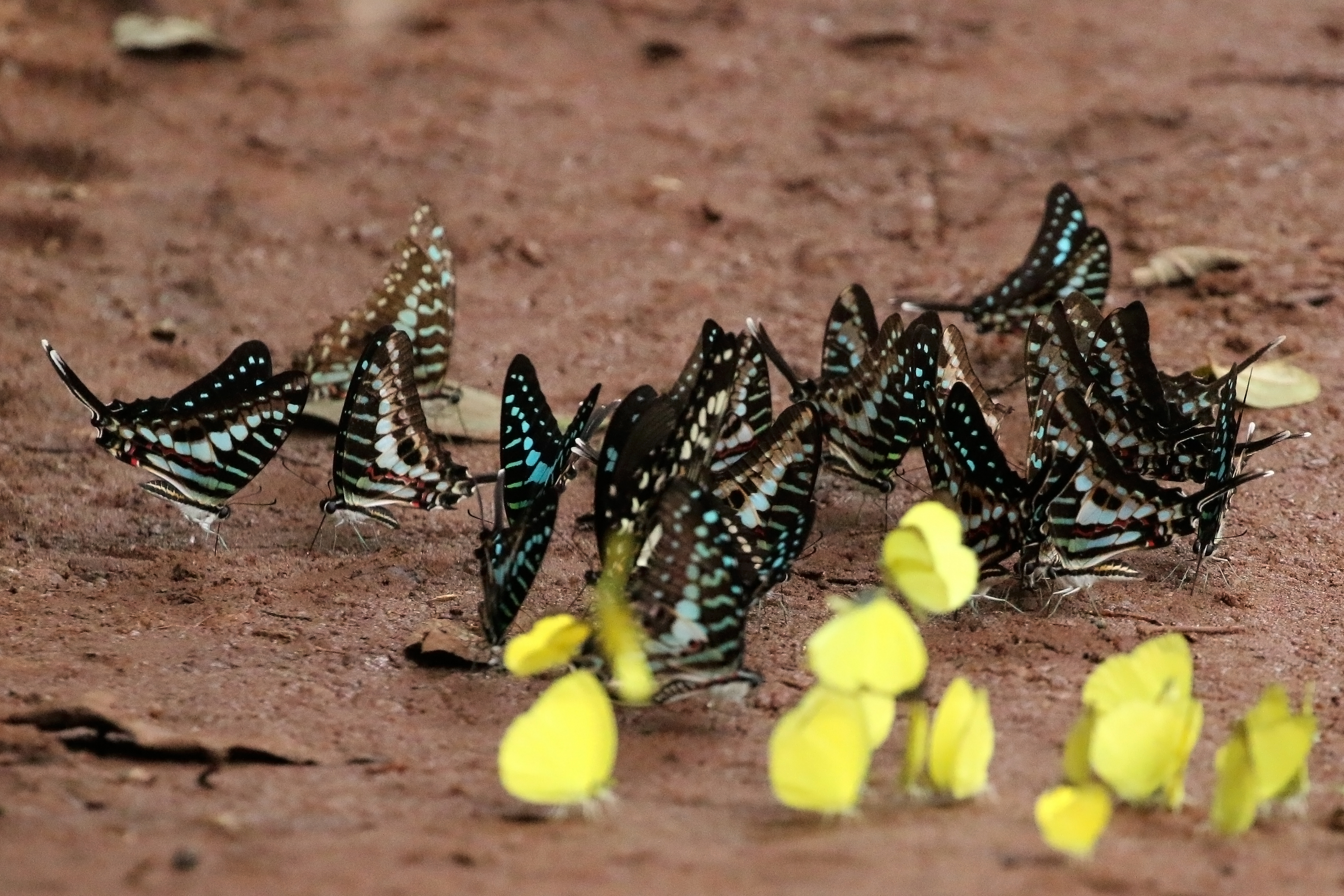
Puddling
Bobiri Forest, Ghana

== Similar species ==
It is very similar to Graphium policenoides and Graphium liponesco It is the nominal member of the policenes -clade (policenes, Graphium liponesco, Graphium biokoensis, Graphium policenoides, Graphium porthaon.)

== Taxonomy ==
Aurivillius in Seitz places policenes (policenoides), nigrescens, sisenna (polistratus), polistratus, junodi, porthaon and collona in the Policenes Group Subgroup 2. It has a circumscribed hindwing with a long, narrow tail of uniform width at vein 4. Frons black with white lateral margins. Wings above with green or greenish white markings. Cell of the forewing with 5 — 6 transverse bands or spots. Both wings with submarginal spots. Hindwing beneath with a so-called ornamental band, formed of red spots. Besides the markings already mentioned, the forewing has a spot at the base of cellules 1 a and 1 b, an oblique transverse streak in the basal part of these cellules, and 8 discal spots, one each in cellules 1 a — 6 and 8. The hindwing has a narrow transverse band at the base, a narrow median band which consists only of three spots (in the cell and in cellules 2 and 7) and usually also 7 discal spots in cellules 1 c -7, of which, however, that in 1 c is red. The larva has four pairs of spines, one pair each on the 1., 2., 3. and penultimate segments. The pupa is very angularly widened at the beginning of the abdomen and has a long hump on the mesothorax. Subgroup 2. The apical fourth of the cell of the hindwing above unicolorous black without light spot. The cell of the forewing with a light spot or dot at the costal margin close before the apex.
