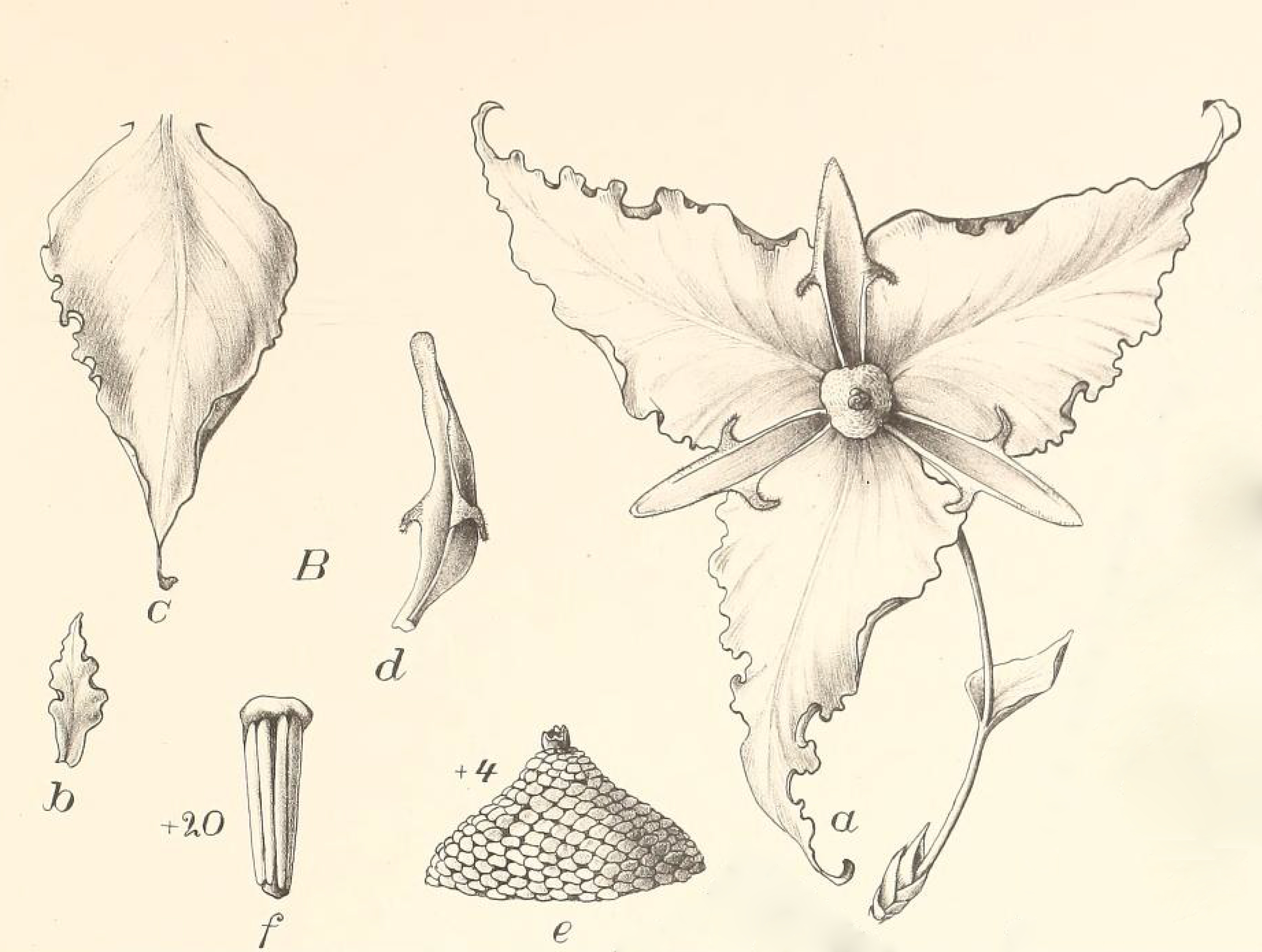
- Botanical illustration of a Monodora minor flower and floral parts

Conservation status
- Near Threatened (IUCN 3.1)

Scientific classification
- Kingdom: Plantae
- Clade: Embryophytes
- Clade: Tracheophytes
- Clade: Spermatophytes
- Clade: Angiosperms
- Clade: Magnoliids
- Order: Magnoliales
- Family: Annonaceae
- Genus: Monodora
- Species: M. minor

Binomial name
- Monodora minor Engl. & Diels

= Monodora minor =

Species of plant in the soursop family

Monodora minor is a species of plant in the family Annonaceae. It is native to Mozambique and Tanzania. Heinrich Gustav Adolf Engler and Ludwig Diels, the German botanists who first formally described the species, do not explicitly explain the specific epithet but it is among the smaller (minor in Latin) members of the genus which includes species that reach heights of 30–40 meters (98–131 ft).

== Description ==
It is a bush or small tree reaching 6 meters (20 ft) in height. Its branches have lenticels. Its papery leaves are 6–18 by 3.3–8 centimeters (2.4–7.1 by 1.3–3.1 in) and rounded at their tips. The leaves are smooth on their upper and lower surfaces. Its petioles are 4–8 millimeters long. Its pendulous flowers are arranged in cymes which are extra-axillary. Each flower is on a pedicel 2–5 centimeters long. Its flowers have 3 oval-shaped sepals that are 7–8 by 4–6 millimeters. Its 6 petals are arranged in two rows of 3. The outer petals are yellow with red highlights, 1.9–2 by 1.1–1.5 centimeters, and have wavy margins. The inner petals are similarly colored with margins that touch one another before they mature. The inner petals have a 3–6 millimeter wide claw at their base and a 1–1.2 by 0.9–1.1 blade. The inner petals are smooth on their outer surface, hairy inside, and densely hairy on their margins. Itsstamens that are 0.5–0.75 millimeters long. Its fruit are 4.2 by 2.5 centimeters and pale green with yellow spots when developing and dark purple when dry. Its shiny, light brown seeds are 1.4 by 1.1 by 0.65 centimeters, and triangular in cross-section.

=== Reproductive biology ===
The pollen of M. minor is shed as permanent tetrads.

== Habitat and distribution ==
It has been observed growing in coastal regions in wet forests at elevations from 100 to 780 meters (330 to 2,560 ft).
