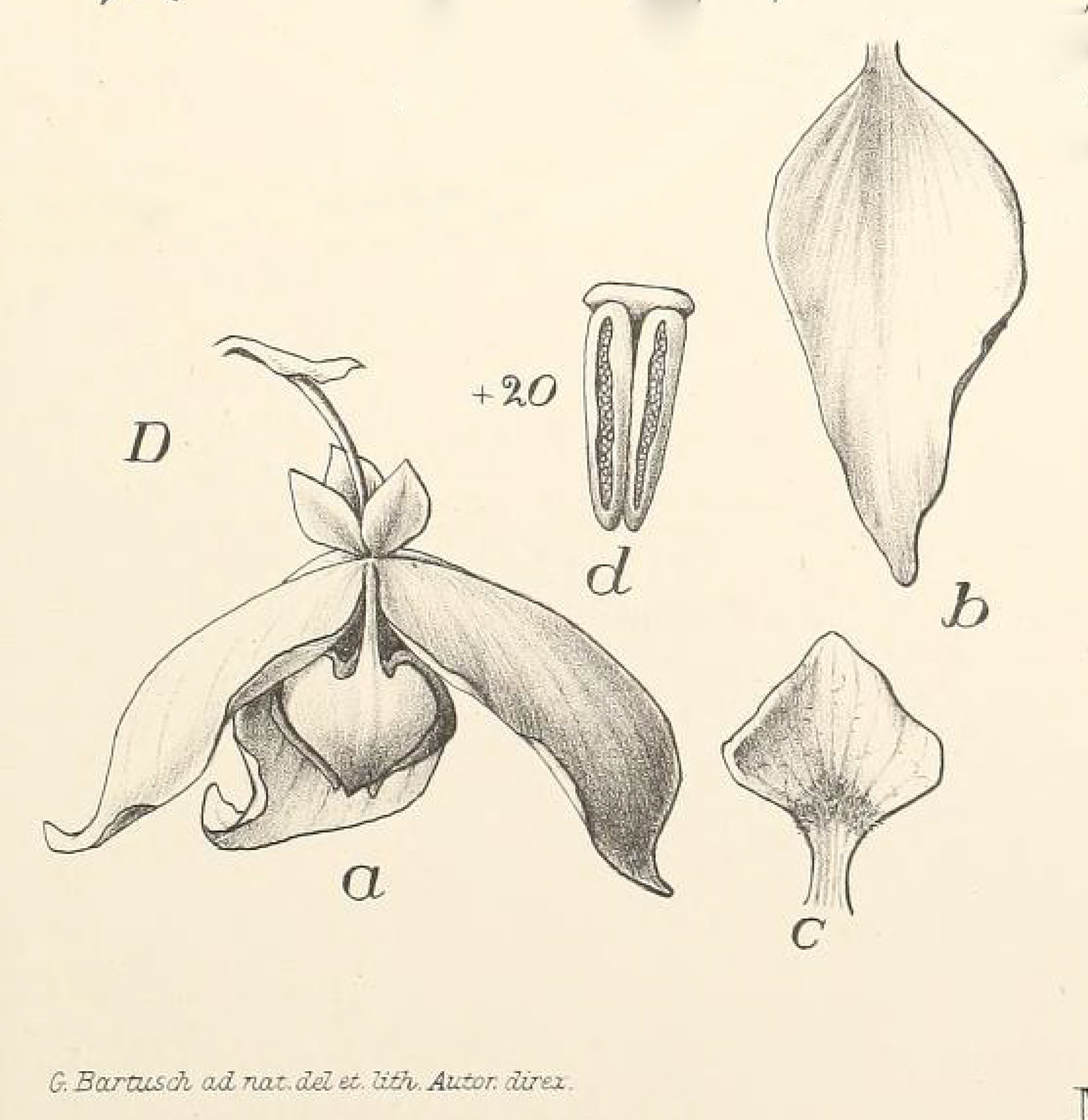
- Botanical illustration of a Monodora junodii flower and floral parts

Conservation status
- Least Concern (IUCN 3.1)

Scientific classification
- Kingdom: Plantae
- Clade: Embryophytes
- Clade: Tracheophytes
- Clade: Spermatophytes
- Clade: Angiosperms
- Clade: Magnoliids
- Order: Magnoliales
- Family: Annonaceae
- Genus: Monodora
- Species: M. junodii

Binomial name
- Monodora junodii Engl. & Diels

= Monodora junodii =

Species of plant in the soursop family

Monodora junodii is a species of plant in the family Annonaceae. It is native to Eswatini, Kenya, Malawi, Mozambique, South Africa, Tanzania, and Zimbabwe. Heinrich Gustav Adolf Engler and Ludwig Diels, the German botanists who first formally described the species, named it after Henri-Alexandre Junod, the Swiss missionary and scientist who collected the specimen that they examined.

== Description ==
It is a tree reaching 7 meters (23 ft) in height. Its branches have lenticels. Its leaves are 6.5–16.5 by 3–5.5 centimeters (2.6–6.5 by 1.2–2.2 in) and come to a point at their tips. The leaves are smooth on their upper and lower surfaces. Its petioles are 1–6 millimeters long. Its pendulous flowers are odorless, solitary and axillary or extra-axillary. Each flower is on a pedicel 0.8–2 centimeters long. Its flowers have 3 slightly hairy, green sepals that are 5–10 millimeters longwith rounded tips. Its 6 petals are arranged in two rows of 3. The outer petals are 2–3.5 by 1.6–2.7 centimeters and yellow when young, but turning puce or purple when mature. The inner petals are similarly colored, have a 0.7–1.0 centimeter long claw at their base and a 1–1.6 by 1.4–2.1 centimeter wide blade. The inner petals are hairy with the exception of the upper side of the claw. Its stamens are 0.5 millimeters long. Its wrinkled, smooth fruit are globe shaped and 4–5 centimeters in diameter and are greenish-grey with brown highlights. Its light yellow-brown, flat, oval-shaped seeds are 1.5–2 centimeters long.

=== Reproductive biology ===
The pollen of M. junodii is shed as permanent tetrads.

== Habitat and distribution ==
It has been observed growing in sandy soil in lowland and evergreen forests at elevations from 0–900 meters (3,000 ft).
