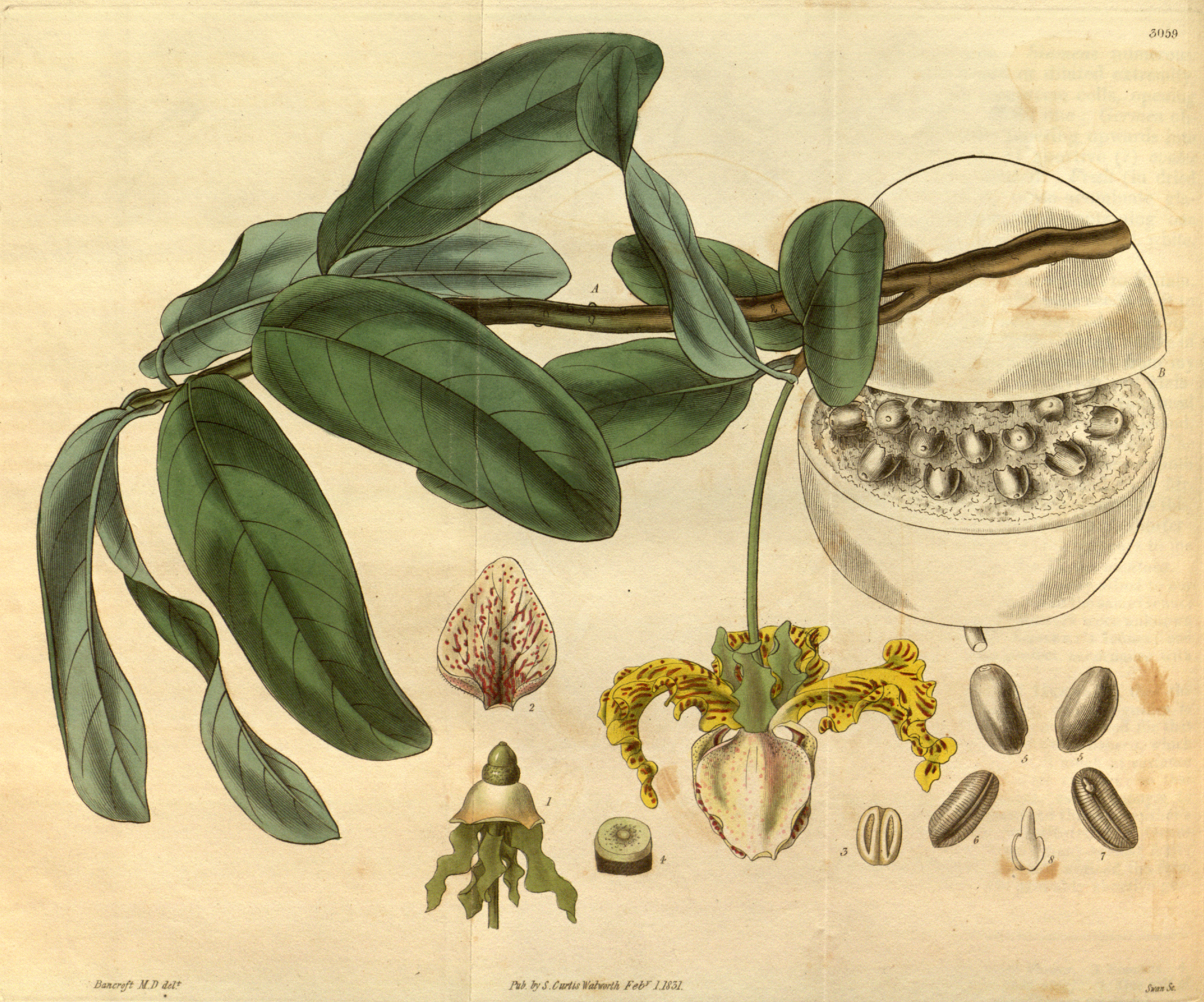
- Illustration from Curtis's Botanical Magazine, 1831

Conservation status
- Least Concern (IUCN 3.1)

Scientific classification
- Kingdom: Plantae
- Clade: Embryophytes
- Clade: Tracheophytes
- Clade: Angiosperms
- Clade: Magnoliids
- Order: Magnoliales
- Family: Annonaceae
- Genus: Monodora
- Species: M. myristica

Binomial name
- Monodora myristica (Gaertn.) Dunal

Synonyms
- Annona myristica Gaertn.; Monodora borealis Scott-Elliot; Monodora claessensii De Wild.; Monodora unwinii Hutch. & Dalziel

= Monodora myristica =

Species of tree

Monodora myristica, the calabash nutmeg or African nutmeg, is a tropical tree of the family Annonaceae or custard apple family of flowering plants. It is native to tropical Africa from Guinea Bissau in the west to Tanzania. In former times, its seeds were widely sold as an inexpensive nutmeg substitute. This is now less common outside its region of production. Other names of calabash nutmeg include Jamaican nutmeg, ehuru, ariwo, awerewa, ehiri, airama, African orchid nutmeg, muscadier de Calabash lubushi, and pebe or pebbe.

== Cultivation and history ==
The calabash nutmeg tree grows naturally in evergreen forests from Liberia to Nigeria and Cameroon, Ghana, Angola and also Uganda and west Kenya. Due to the slave trade in the 18th century, the tree was introduced to the Caribbean islands where it was established and became known as Jamaican nutmeg. In 1897, Monodora myristica was introduced to Bogor Botanical Gardens, Indonesia, where the trees flower on a regular basis but no fruit could yet be collected. Due to its large and orchid-like flowers, the tree is also grown as an ornamental.

== Botany ==
=== Tree and leaves ===
Monodora myristica can reach a height of 35 m (115 ft) and 2 m (6 ft 7 in) in diameter at breast height (DBH). It has a clear trunk and branches horizontally. The leaves are alternately arranged and drooping with the leaf blade being elliptical, oblong or broadest towards the apex and tapering to the stalk. They are petiolate and can reach a size of up to 45 cm × 20 cm (17.7 in × 7.9 in).

=== Flower ===
The flower appears at the base of new shoots and is singular, pendant, large and fragrant. The pedicel bears a leaf-like bract and can reach 20 cm (7.9 in) in length. The flower's sepals are red-spotted, crisped and 2.5 cm (0.98 in) long. The corolla is formed of six petals of which the three outer reach a length of 10 cm (3.9 in) and show curled margins and red, green and yellow spots. The three inner petals are almost triangular and form a white-yellowish cone which on the outside is red-spotted and green on the inside. The flower's stigmas become receptive before its stamens mature and shed their pollen (protogynous). Its pollen is shed as permanent tetrads. The flower is pollinated by insects.

=== Fruit and seeds ===
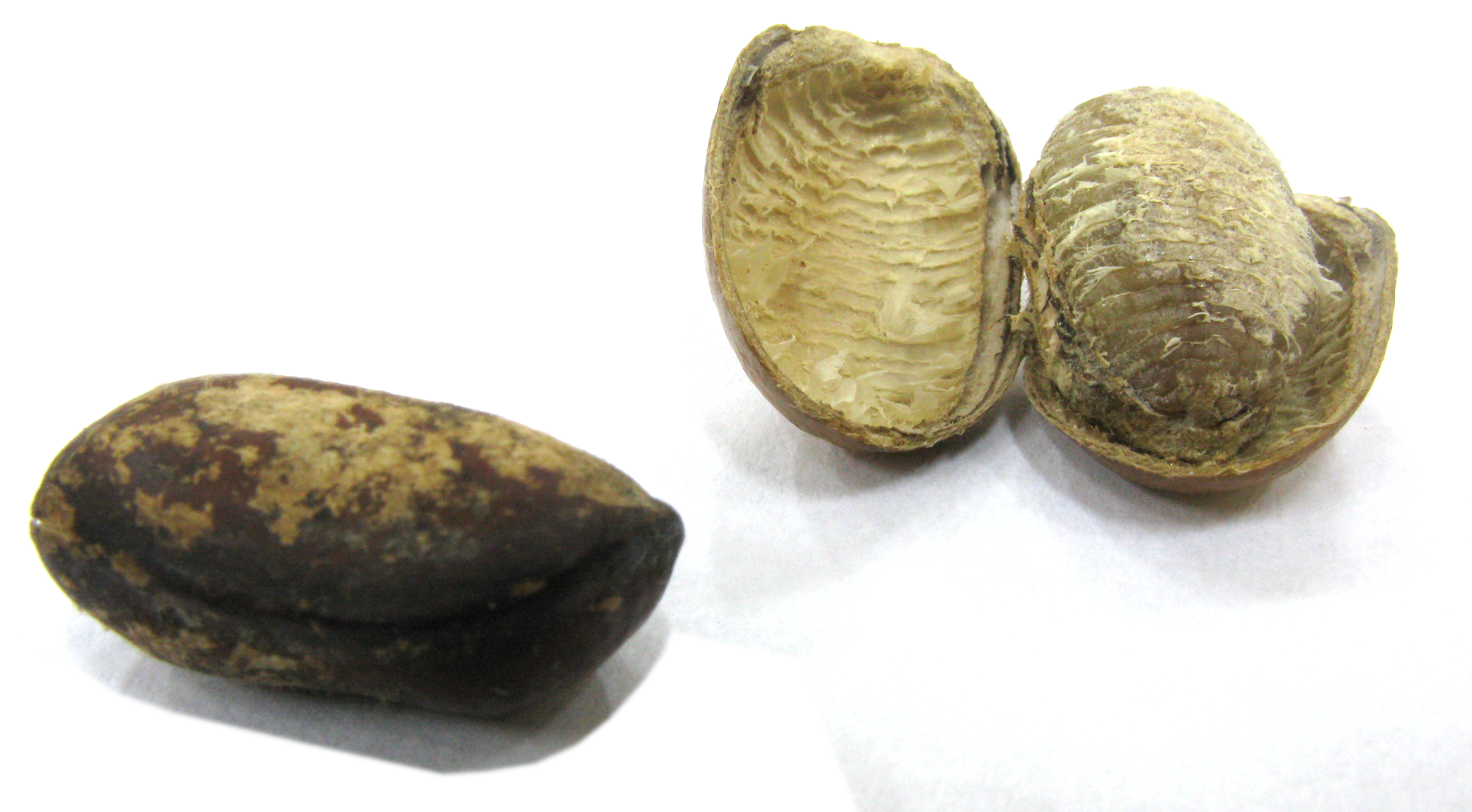
Seeds

The fruit is a berry of 20 cm (7.9 in) diameter and is smooth, green and spherical and becomes woody. It is attached to a long stalk which is up to 60 cm (24 in) long. Inside the fruit the numerous oblongoid, pale brown, 1.5 cm (0.59 in) long seeds are surrounded by a whitish fragrant pulp. The seeds contain 5-9% of a colourless essential oil.

== Uses ==
=== Fruit and seeds ===
The odour and taste of the Monodora myristica seed is similar to nutmeg and it is used as a popular spice in the West African cuisine. The fruits are collected from wild trees and the seeds are dried and sold whole or ground to be used in stews, soups, cakes and desserts. For medicinal purposes they are used as stimulants, stomachic, for headaches, sores and also as insect repellent. The seeds are also made into necklaces.

=== Timber and bark ===
Monodora myristica timber is hard but easy to work with and is used for carpentry, house fittings and joinery. In medicine, the bark is used in treatments of stomach-aches, febrile pains, eye diseases and haemorrhoids.

== Chemical compounds ==
The essential oil that can be obtained from the leaves contains β-caryophyllene, α-humulene and α-pinene. The major compounds found in the essential oil from the seeds are α-phellandrene, α-pinene, myrcene, limonene and pinene.
