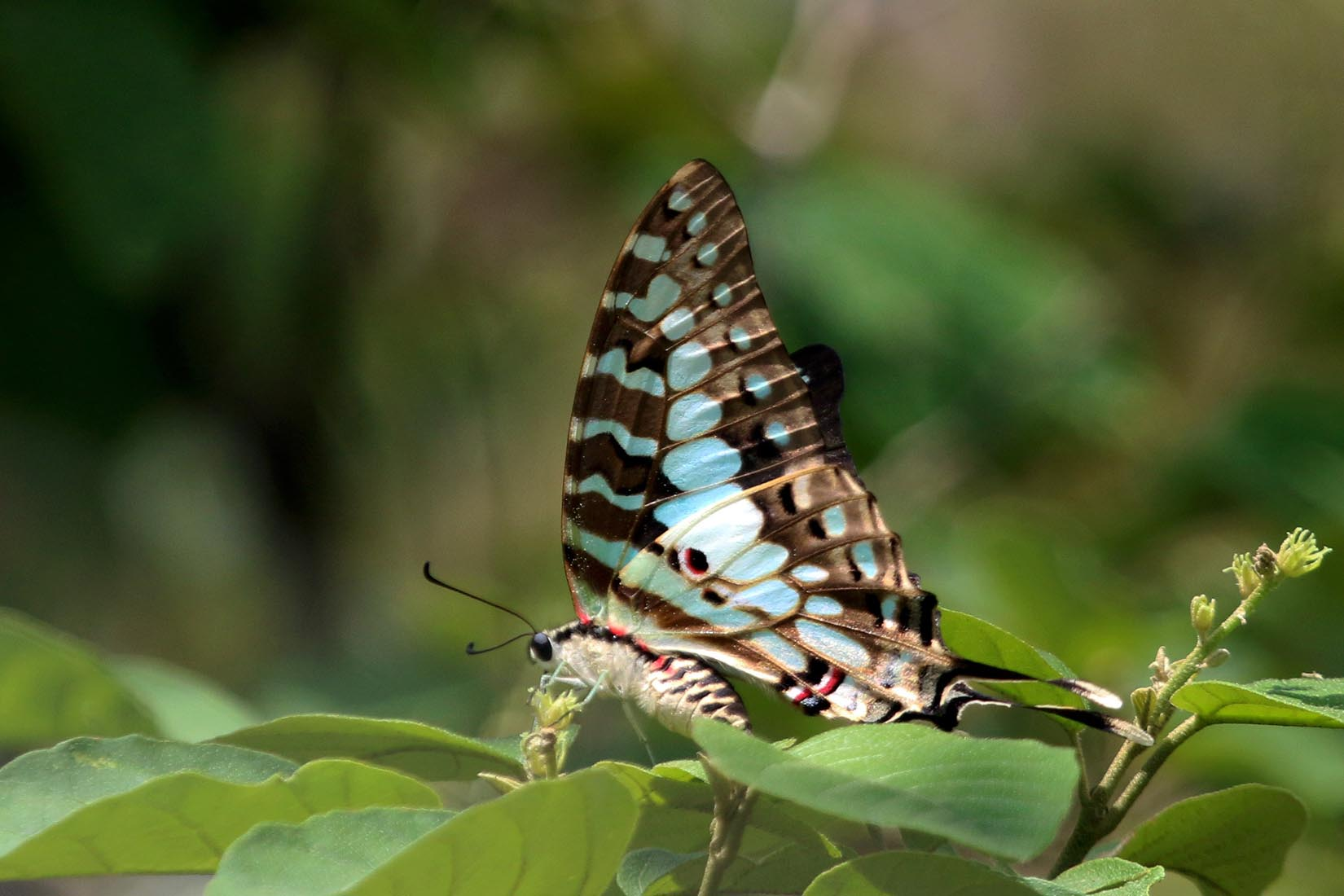
- At Phinda Private Game Reserve, KwaZulu Natal, South Africa

Scientific classification
- Kingdom: Animalia
- Phylum: Arthropoda
- Clade: Pancrustacea
- Class: Insecta
- Order: Lepidoptera
- Family: Papilionidae
- Genus: Graphium
- Species: G. antheus

Binomial name
- Graphium antheus (Cramer, [1779])

Synonyms
- Papilio antheus (Cramer, 1849); Papilio nyassae Butler, 1877; Papilio lurlinus Butler, 1883; Papilio utuba Hampson, 1891; Papilio antharis Godart, 1819; Papilio antheus evombaroides Eimer, 1889; Papilio mercutius Grose-Smith & Kirby, 1894; Papilio hollandi Grose-Smith & Kirby, 1894; Papilio antheus ab. scheffleri Strand, 1909; Papilio antheuslatepictulus Strand, 1914; Papilio antheus ab. combinata Strand, 1914; Papilio antheus f. micrevombaroides Strand, 1914; Papilio antheus ab. misanus Strand, 1914; Papilio antheus ab. hoesemanni Strand, 1914; Papilio antheus ab. rubrimacula Strand, 1914; Papilio antheus ab. comma Strand, 1914; Papilio (Cosmodesmus) antheus antheus ab. mathieui Dufrane, 1946; Papilio (Cosmodesmus) antheus antheus ab. paradoxa Dufrane, 1946; Papilio antheus f. atrantheus Basquin & Turlin, 1986

= Graphium antheus =

Large striped swordtail

Species of butterfly

Graphium antheus, the large or larger striped swordtail, is a species of butterfly in the family Papilionidae (swallowtails), found in tropical and sub-Saharan Africa.

== Description ==
The wingspan is 65–70 mm in males and 70–75 mm in females.The transverse bars in the cell of the forewing all separated; the apical spot in the cell of the hindwing above completely separated from the median band of the cell by the black ground-colour; the middle cell of the hindwing beneath with a deep black and red spot. The larva is brown to brown-green with a yellow belt on the third segment and lives on Artabotrys, an Annonaceae. Sierra Leone to Angola. — In ab.evombaroides Eim. the apical spot of the cell of the hindwing above is more or less united with the median band; otherwise not different from antheus. West Africa. — In ab. utuba Hamps. the fourth and fifth transverse bands in the cell of the forewing are united posteriorly, forming a U-shaped spot; otherwise agreeing with nyassae. Delagoa and British East Africa. — nyassae Btlr. has the middle cell of the hindwing beneath without the black and red spot; the transverse bars in the coll of the fore wing separated. Natal to British East Africa. — ab. (var. ?) lurlinus Btlr. is somewhat larger than antheus and has the green markings of the upperside more extended, especially the transverse bars in the cell of the fore wing and the submarginal spots of both wings are nearly twice as large as in the latter. Nyassaland and in the neighbourhood of Victoria Nyanza. mercutius Sm. & Kirby. Markings of the upper surface yellowish white; second and third transverse bands and again fourth and fifth transverse bands united to form a large, almost quadrate spot; the hindwing on both surfaces with a red spot in 1 c and 2 and beneath also with a red dot in cellule 7; the cell of the hinclwing on the other hand without red or black spot. Only one specimen known. Is perhaps only an aberration of the female of nyassae. Delagoa Bay.

Torben Larsen developed a species numbering system for his 2005 publication Butterflies of West Africa. This species is #34. The 'Larsen' numbers have since been used with permission in A Sharp Eye on Butterflies of Ghana.

== Biology ==
The flight period is year-round, peaking from November to December.

The larva feeds on Uvaria caffra, Artabotrys monteiroae, Annona reticulata, Annona senegalensis, Artabotrys brachypetalus, Cleistochlamys kirkii, Hexalobus monopetalus, Landolphia ugandensis, Monanthotaxis caffra, Monodora junodi, and Uvaria kirkii.

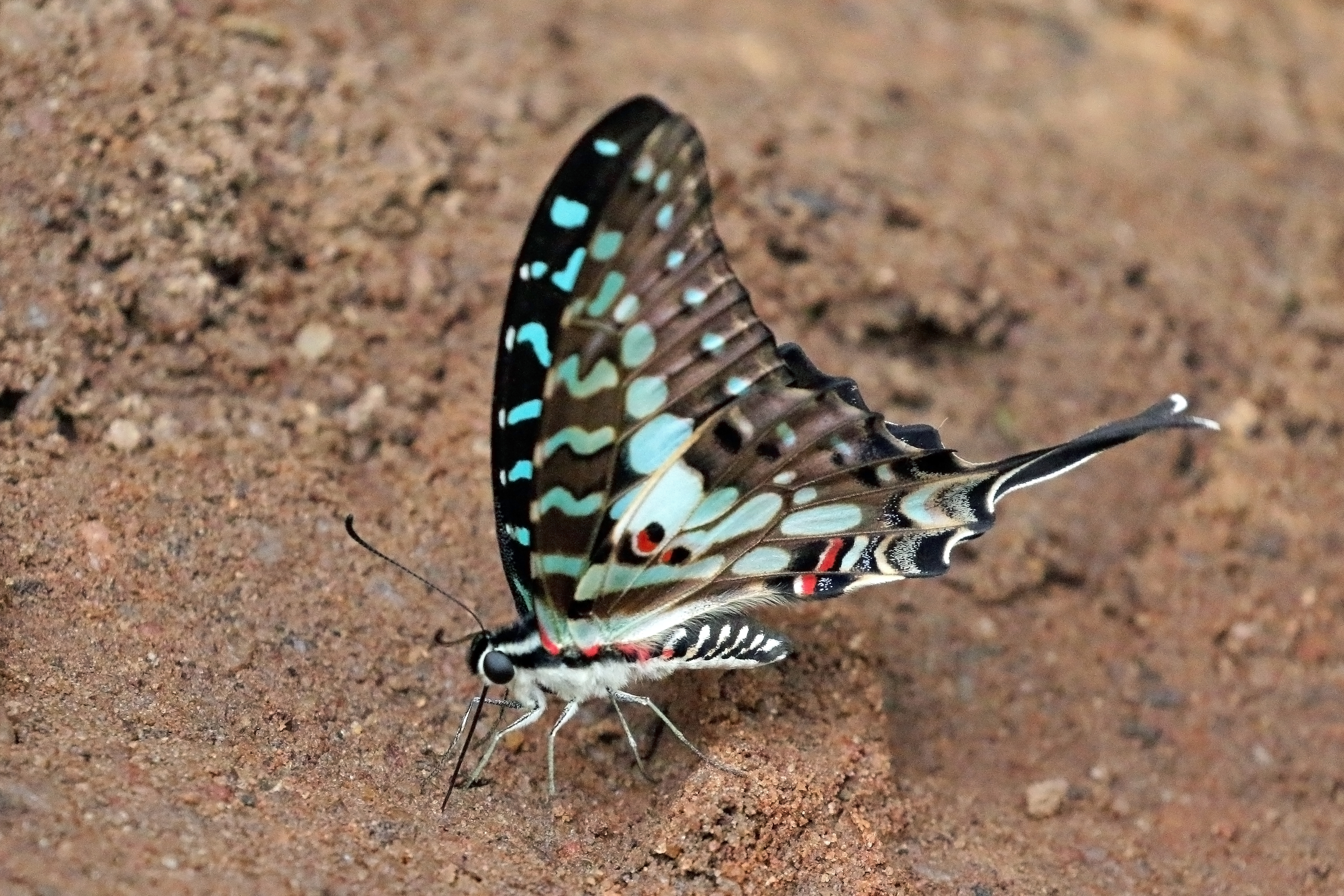
Fresh male, underside
Bobiri Forest, Ghana

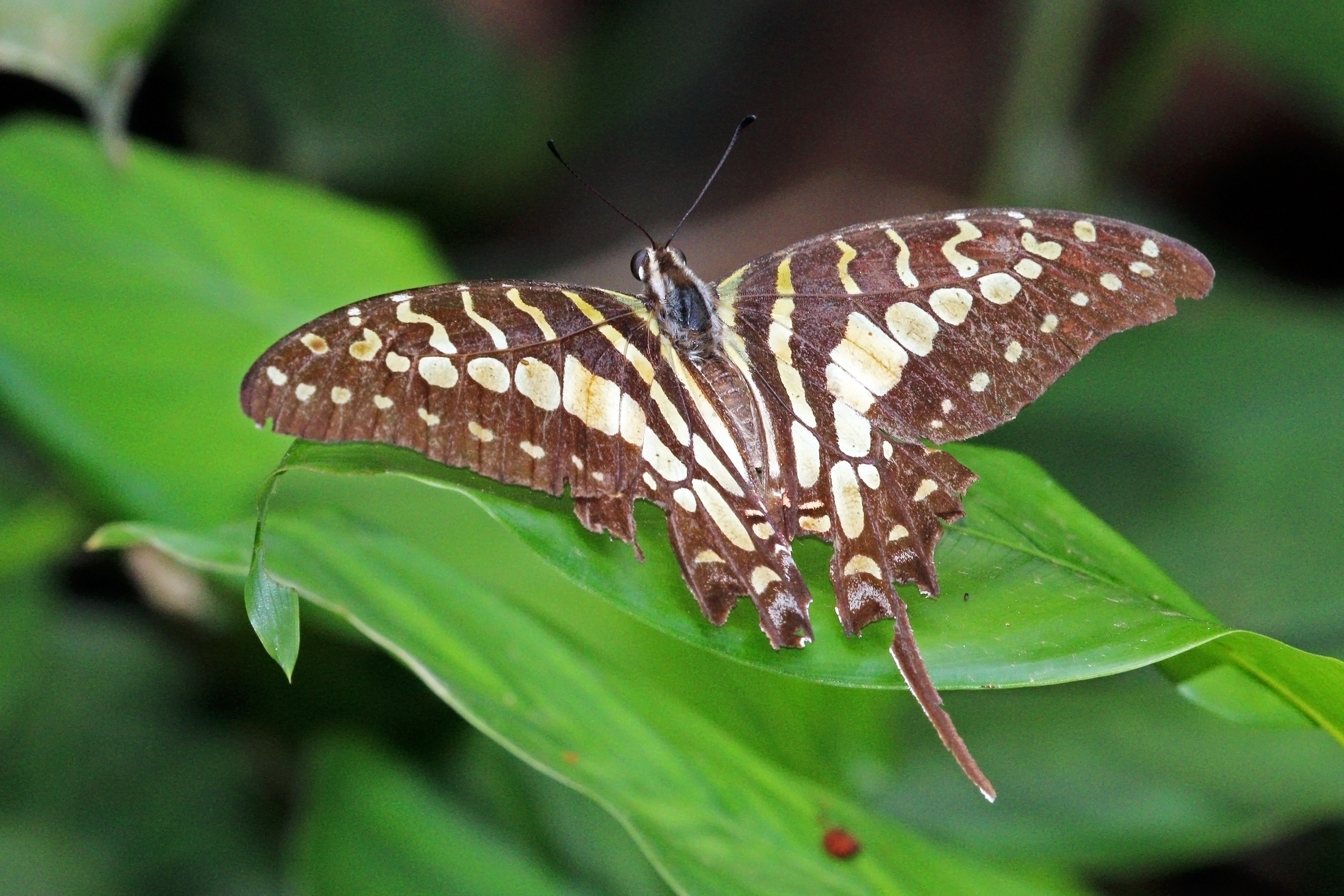
Mature
Bobiri Forest

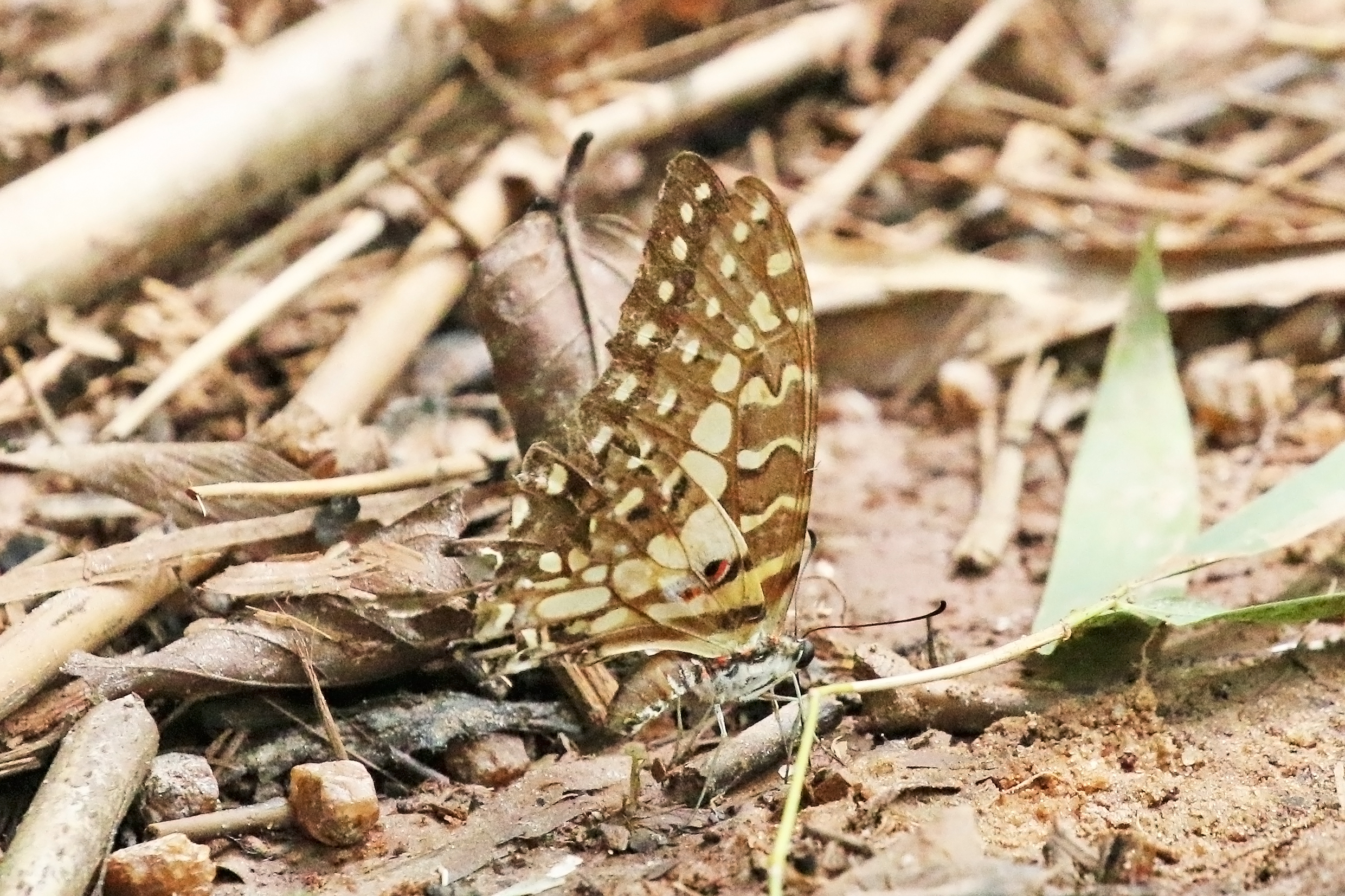
Mature, underside
Bobiri Forest

== Taxonomy ==
Graphium antheus is the nominal member of the antheus - clade (antheus, Graphium evombar, Graphium kirbyi, Graphium junodi, Graphium polistratus, Graphium colonna, Graphium illyris, Graphium gudenusi).

Aurivillius in Seitz places evombar and antheus in the policenes Group Subgroup 1 circumscribed-Hindwing with a long, narrow tail of uniform width at vein 4. Frons black with white lateral margins. Wings above with green or greenish white markings. Cell of the forewing with 5 — 6 transverse bands or spots.Both wings with submarginal spots. Hindwing beneath with a so-called ornamental band, formed of red spots. Besides the markings already mentioned the forewing has a spot at the base of cellules 1 a and 1 b, an oblique transverse streak in the basal part of these cellules and 8 discal spots, one each in cellules 1 a — 6 and 8; the hindwing has a narrow transverse band at the base, a narrow median band which consists only of three spots (in the cell and in cellules 2 and 7) and usually also 7 discal spots in cellules 1 c -7, of which, however, that in 1 c is red. The larva has four pairs of spines, one pair each on the 1., 2., 3. and penultimate segments. The pupa is very angularly widened at the beginning of the abdomen and has a long hump on the mesothorax. Subgroup 1.Hindwing in the apex of the cell with an additional light spot which is sometimes more or less united with the spot of the median band. The discal spot in cellule 3 of the hindwing is elongated and nearly or quite reaches the base of the cellule. Wings beneath spotted with red at the extreme basal margin. Cell of the forewing behind the fifth transverse streak unicolorous, without spots.
