= Yingzhaosu A =

Names
- IUPAC name (E,3S)-5-[(1S,4S,5S,8R)-4,8-Dimethyl-2,3-dioxabicyclo[3.3.1]nonan-4-yl]-2-methylpent-4-ene-2,3-diol
- Other names (+)-Yingzhaosu A

Identifiers
| CAS Number | 73301-54-9 |
| 3D model (JSmol) | Interactive image |
| ChemSpider | 4947417 |
| PubChem CID | 6443428 |
| UNII | 12M9EZ4ZWA |
- InChI: InChI=1S/C15H26O4/c1-10-5-6-11-9-12(10)18-19-15(11,4)8-7-13(16)14(2,3)17/h7-8,10-13,16-17H,5-6,9H2,1-4H3/b8-7+/t10-,11+,12+,13+,15-/m1/s1 Key: CWGVNUWQWUADFX-IJOGBMPNSA-N
- SMILES: C[C@@H]1CC[C@H]2C[C@@H]1OO[C@]2(C)/C=C/[C@@H](C(C)(C)O)O

Properties
| Chemical formula | C_{15}H_{26}O_{4} |
| Molar mass | 270.369 g·mol^{−1} |
- Except where otherwise noted, data are given for materials in their standard state (at 25 °C [77 °F], 100 kPa). Infobox references

Yingzhaosu A is a sesquiterpene peroxide natural product isolated from the roots of the plant Artabotrys hexapetalus (syn. Artabotrys uncinatus), a climbing shrub native to Southeast Asia and traditionally used in folk medicine for treating malaria and other ailments. It exhibits antimalarial activity against Plasmodium falciparum and Plasmodium berghei.

== Discovery and isolation ==
Yingzhaosu A was first isolated in 1979 from the roots of Artabotrys hexapetalus, a plant known as yingzhao in Chinese, along with related compounds yingzhaosu B, C, and D. The isolation was reported by researchers at the Shanghai Institute of Organic Chemistry, where the compound was extracted from root material stored in the shade for two months. The plant has a history of use in Asian folk medicine for treating fevers, malaria, microbial infections, ulcers, hepatic disorders, cholera, diarrhea, dysentery, cuts, sprains, asthma, and as an antifertility agent.

== Biological activity ==
Yingzhaosu A displays antimalarial activity against chloroquine-resistant strains of Plasmodium falciparum (IC_{50} = 115 nM against K1 strain) and P. berghei (ED_{50} = 250 mg/kg in vivo). Its C14-epi analog shows higher potency (IC_{50} = 56 nM; ED_{50} = 90 mg/kg). The mechanism involves iron(II)-induced degradation in a Fenton-type reaction, leading to alkylating species: an unsaturated ketone and a cyclohexyl radical, which target parasitic proteins. Bioreductive activation with heme iron can also cleave the endoperoxide bond, generating reactive radicals. The peroxide linkage is essential for activity, similar to artemisinin.

== Synthesis ==
The first total synthesis of yingzhaosu A was achieved in 1993 starting from (R)-(−)-carvone. A later synthesis in 2005 accomplished the total synthesis of yingzhaosu A and its C(14)-epimer in eight steps with a 7.3% overall yield starting from (S)-limonene. Key steps included selective hydrogenation of a carbon-carbon double bond in the presence of a peroxide and aldehyde, a Mukaiyama aldol reaction followed by dehydration, and stereoselective reduction using CBS catalysts.

== Analogs ==
Seeking to improve upon the antimalarial activity of yingzhaosu A, medicinal chemists have prepared synthetic and semi-synthetic analogs with better drug-like properties. Several of these analogs, such as arteflene, have undergone clinical evaluation for malaria treatment.

Chemical structure of arteflene
