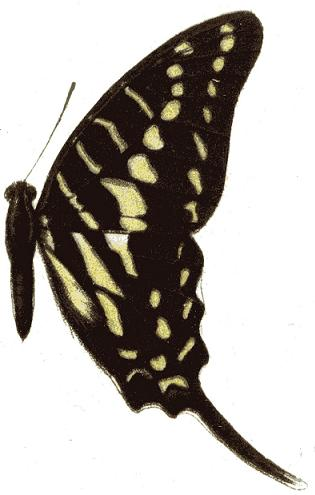

Scientific classification
- Kingdom: Animalia
- Phylum: Arthropoda
- Clade: Pancrustacea
- Class: Insecta
- Order: Lepidoptera
- Family: Papilionidae
- Genus: Graphium
- Species: G. polistratus

Binomial name
- Graphium polistratus (Grose-Smith, 1889)

Synonyms
- Papilio polistratus Grose-Smith, 1889; Graphium (Arisbe) polistratus; Papilio sisenna Mabille, 1890; Papilio richelmanni Weymer, 1892

= Graphium polistratus =

Species of butterfly

Graphium polistratus, the dancing swordtail, is a butterfly in the family Papilionidae (swallowtails). It is found in Nigeria, the Democratic Republic of the Congo, the coast of Kenya, Tanzania, northern Malawi and Mozambique. Its habitat consists of warm and coastal forests.

== Description ==
The last three transverse bars in the cell of the forewing somewhat curved.Hindwing above without red spot in cellule 1 c; the discal spots 2 to 5 of the hindwing above are entirely absent; the apex of the cell of the hindwing beneath without red spot; the discal spot in cellule 6 of the hindwing narrow, streak-like; the large light basal spot in cellule 2 of the hindwing is entirely absent on the under surface or is only indicated; the markings of the upper surface light green. Portuguese to British East Africa. — richelmanni Weym. only differs in having the discal spots in cellules 4 and 5 of the hindwing present. German East Africa. External images from Royal Museum of Central Africa.

== Biology ==
Adult males mud-puddle. Both sexes feed from flowers. Adults are probably on wing year round.

The larvae feed on Annona senegalensis and Uvaria species.

== Taxonomy ==
Graphium polistratus is a member of the antheus - clade Graphium antheus, Graphium colonna,Graphium evombar, Graphium kirbyi, Graphium junodi, Graphium polistratus, Graphium illyris, Graphium gudenusi).

Aurivillius in Seitz places polistratus (as sisenna), nigrescens (policenoides), policenes, junodi, porthaon and collona in the Policenes Group Subgroup 2 circumscribed Hindwing with a long, narrow tail of uniform width at vein 4. Frons black with white lateral margins. Wings above with green or greenish white markings. Cell of the forewing with 5 — 6 transverse bands or spots. Both wings with submarginal spots. Hindwing beneath with a so-called ornamental band, formed of red spots. Besides the markings already mentioned the forewing has a spot at the base of cellules 1 a and 1 b, an oblique transverse streak in the basal part of these cellules and 8 discal spots, one each in cellules 1 a — 6 and 8; the hindwing has a narrow transverse band at the base, a narrow median band which consists only of three spots (in the cell and in cellules 2 and 7) and usually also 7 discal spots in cellules 1 c -7, of 'which, however, that in 1 c is red. The larva has four pairs of spines, one pair each on the 1., 2., 3. and penultimate segments. The pupa is very angularly widened at the beginning of the abdomen and has a long hump on the mesothorax. Subgroup 2.The apical fourth of the cell of the hindwing above unicolorous black without light spot. The cell of the forewing with a light spot or dot at the costal margin close before the apex.

== See also ==
- Shimba Hills National Reserve Habitat in Kenya
