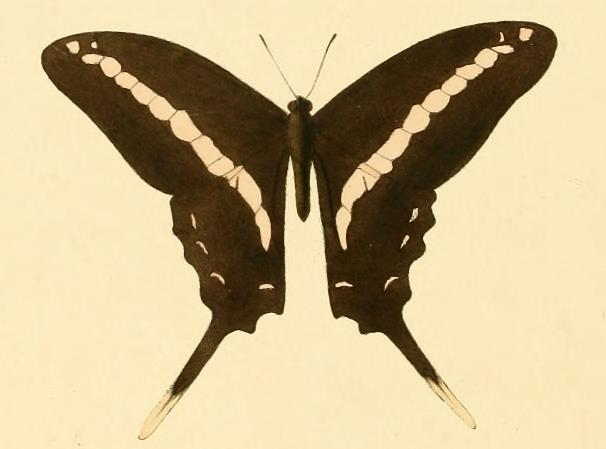

Scientific classification
- Kingdom: Animalia
- Phylum: Arthropoda
- Clade: Pancrustacea
- Class: Insecta
- Order: Lepidoptera
- Family: Papilionidae
- Genus: Graphium
- Species: G. kirbyi

Binomial name
- Graphium kirbyi (Hewitson, 1872)

Synonyms
- Papilio kirbyi Hewitson, 1872; Graphium (Arisbe) kirbyi; Papilio kirbyi var. ottonis Aurivillius, 1899

= Graphium kirbyi =

Species of butterfly

Graphium kirbyi, the Kirby's swordtail, is a butterfly in the family Papilionidae. It is found along the coast of Kenya and from the coast of Tanzania, inland to Morogoro. The habitat consists of coastal forests.

== Description ==
The hindwing is tailed as in Graphium policenes an it also agrees in the other distinguishing marks so nearly with policenes that it can scarcely be distinguished from it except by the unicolorous black middle cell of the forewing and the absence of the submarginal spots of the same wing. The markings of the upper surface consist only of a narrow median band, which, however, is continuous from the costal margin of the forewing to the middle of the inner margin of the hindwing and composed of 8 to 9 spots on the forewing (in cellules 1 a to 6 or 7 and 8) and 4 spots on the hindwing (in cellules 1 c, 6, 7 and the middle cell), and of 4 to 6 submarginal spots on the hindwing. The hindwing above without red spots. The ornamental band of the hindwing beneath is well developed and consists of red, black-bordered bars in cellules 1 c, 2, 3, 7 and in the apex of the middle cell.

== Biology ==
Adults of both sexes visit flowers and males are known to mud-puddle. Adults are on wing from September to November.

The larvae feed on Annona senegalensis and Uvaria species.

== Taxonomy ==
Graphium kirbyi is a member of the antheus - clade Graphium antheus, Graphium colonna,Graphium evombar, Graphium kirbyi, Graphium junodi, Graphium polistratus, Graphium illyris, Graphium gudenusi).

== See also ==
- Kimboza Forest Habitat in Tanzania
