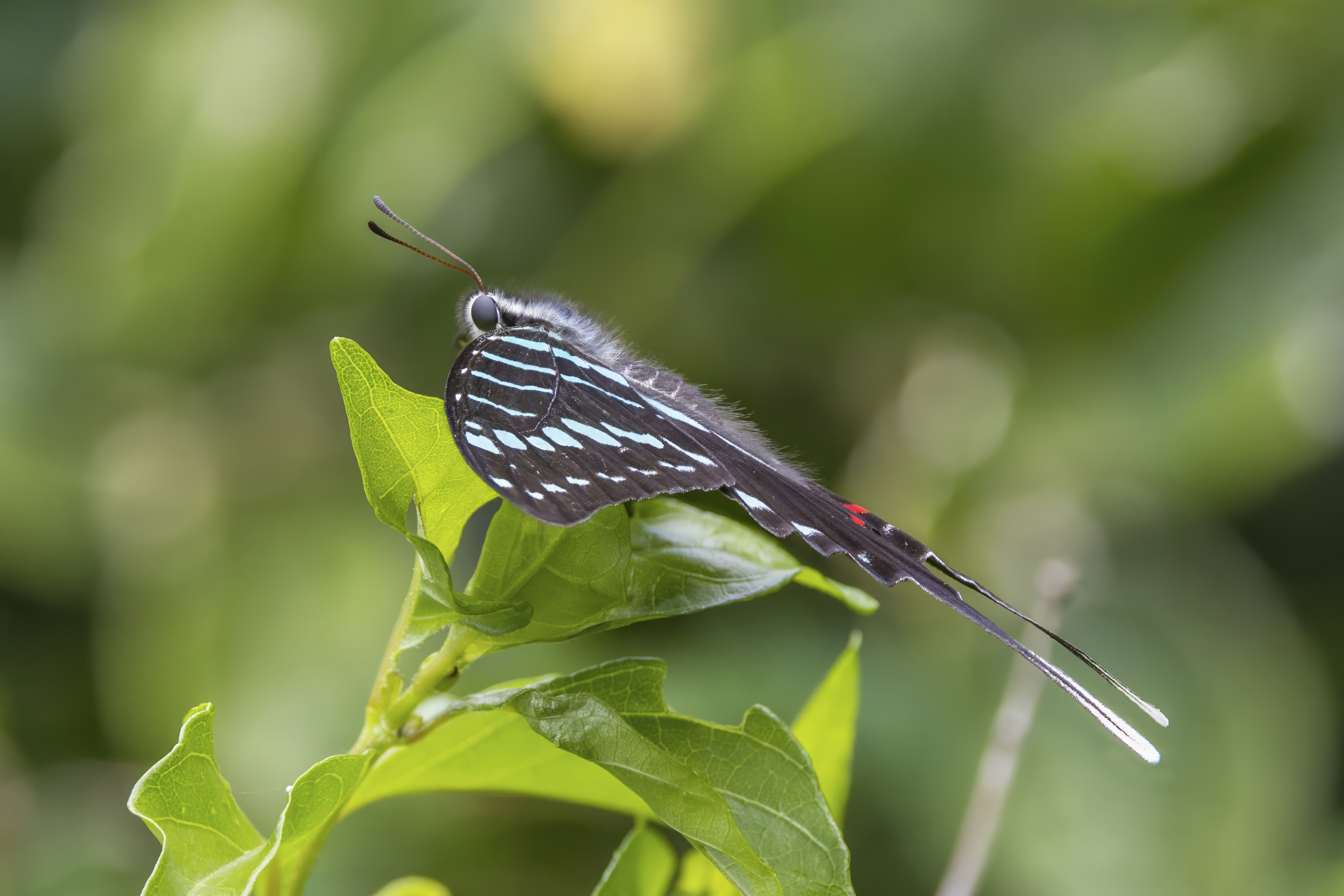
- Maputo National Park, Mozambique

Scientific classification
- Kingdom: Animalia
- Phylum: Arthropoda
- Clade: Pancrustacea
- Class: Insecta
- Order: Lepidoptera
- Family: Papilionidae
- Genus: Graphium
- Species: G. colonna

Binomial name
- Graphium colonna (Ward, 1873)

Synonyms
- Papilio colonna (Ward, 1873); Papilio tragicus Butler, 1876; Papilio colonna loncona Suffert, 1904

= Graphium colonna =

Black swordtail

Species of butterfly

Graphium colonna, the black swordtail or mamba swordtail, is a species of butterfly in the family Papilionidae (swallowtails). It is found in Africa (Liberia, Sierra Leone, Ghana, Ivory Coast, Togo, Equatorial Guinea, Gabon, Democratic Republic of Congo, Central African Republic, Sudan, Southwest Ethiopia, Southern Somalia, Uganda, coastal Kenya, Tanzania, Mozambique, Eastern Zimbabwe, Zululand, and Eswatini).

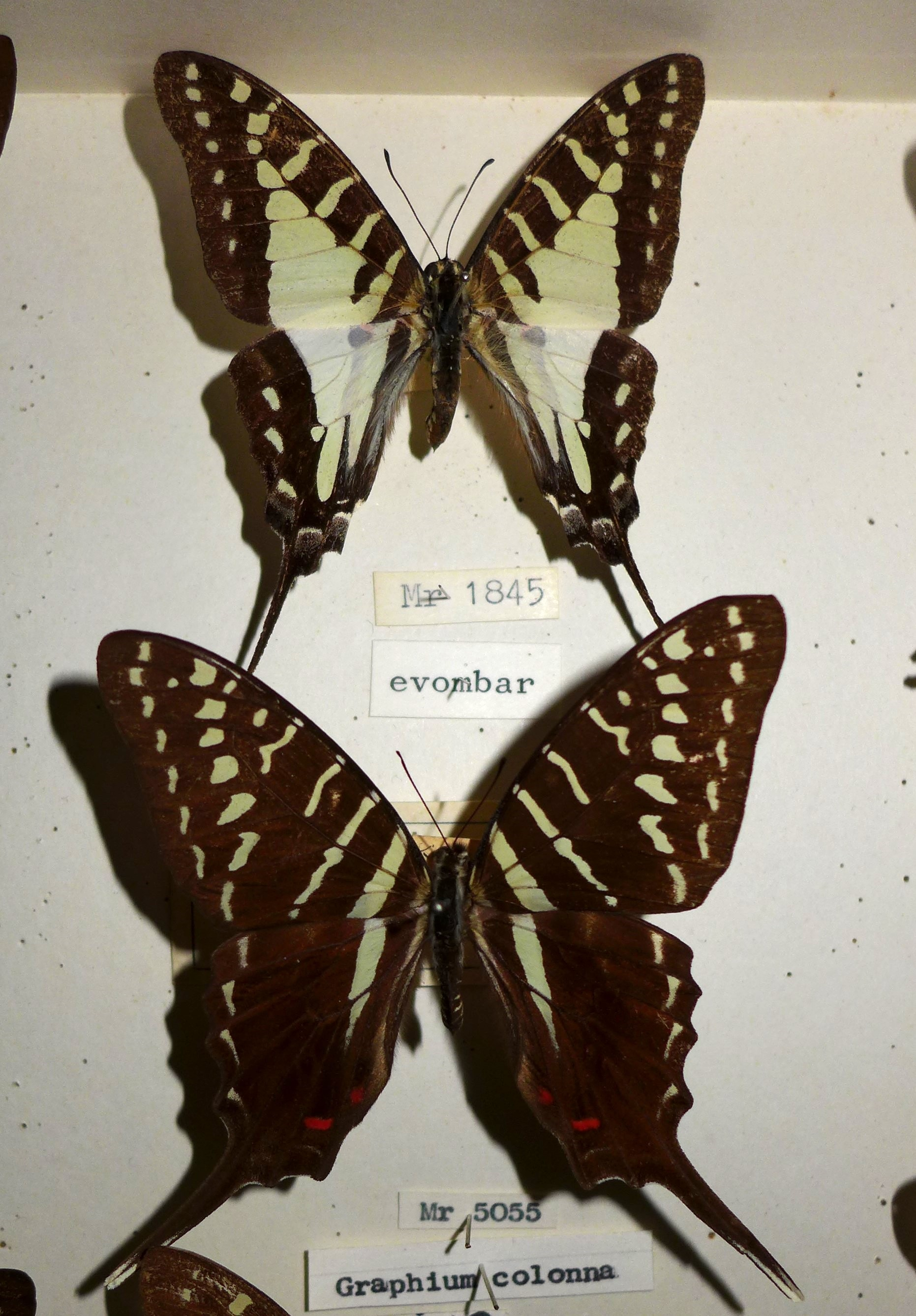

== Description ==
The wingspan is 55–60 mm (2.2–2.4 in) in males and 60–65 mm (2.4–2.6 in) in females. The markings of the upper surface green, only two transverse streaks of the hindwing in cellules 1 c and 2 red; the ground-colour darker than in related species, almost pure black; distinguished from all related species by having the discal spot in cellule lb of the forewing very narrow, streak-like, and forming a direct continuation of the second transverse bar of the middle cell, and further by having the discal spot in cellule 2 of the forewing also narrow and placed almost exactly at the middle of vein 2; the hindwing entirely without green discal spots. The larva is yellowish green with a violet-brown lateral line; the spines on the second and third segments are not simple as normally, but bear small spines; it lives on an Annonaceae of the genus Artabotrys. The pupa is light bluish green and uneven, so that it is deceptively similar to a leaf partly eaten by larvae; the silken girth of the pupa is very thin and often breaks off, so that the pupa hangs quite free like that of a Nymphalid. On the east coast of Africa, from Delagoa Bay to British loncona. East Africa. — ab. loncona Suff. only differs in having the narrow green median band of the hindwing posteriorly bounded by the median and hence not forming the usual spot in the base of cellule 2. German East Africa.External images from Royal Museum of Central Africa.

== Biology ==
The species has continuous broods during warmer months, October to April. The larvae feed on Artabotrys, Uvaria, and Annona species.

== Taxonomy ==
Graphium colonna is a member of the antheus - clade (colonna, Graphium antheus, Graphium evombar, Graphium kirbyi, Graphium junodi, Graphium polistratus, Graphium illyris, Graphium gudenusi).

Aurivillius in Seitz places colonna, nigrescens (policenoides), policenes,sisenna (polistratus), polistratus, junodi and porthaon in the Policenes Group Subgroup 2 circumscribed Hindwing with a long, narrow tail of uniform width at vein 4. Frons black with white lateral margins. Wings above with green or greenish white markings. Cell of the forewing with 5–6 transverse bands or spots. Both wings with submarginal spots. Hindwing beneath with a so-called ornamental band, formed of red spots. Besides the markings already mentioned the forewing has a spot at the base of cellules 1 a and 1 b, an oblique transverse streak in the basal part of these cellules and 8 discal spots, one each in cellules 1 a — 6 and 8; the hindwing has a narrow transverse band at the base, a narrow median band which consists only of three spots (in the cell and in cellules 2 and 7) and usually also 7 discal spots in cellules 1 c -7, of 'which, however, that in 1 c is red. The larva has four pairs of spines, one pair each on the 1., 2., 3. and penultimate segments. The pupa is very angularly widened at the beginning of the abdomen and has a long hump on the mesothorax. Subgroup 2.The apical fourth of the cell of the hindwing above unicolorous black without light spot. The cell of the forewing with a light spot or dot at the costal margin close before the apex.

== See also ==
- Arabuko Sokoke National Park Habitat in Kenya
