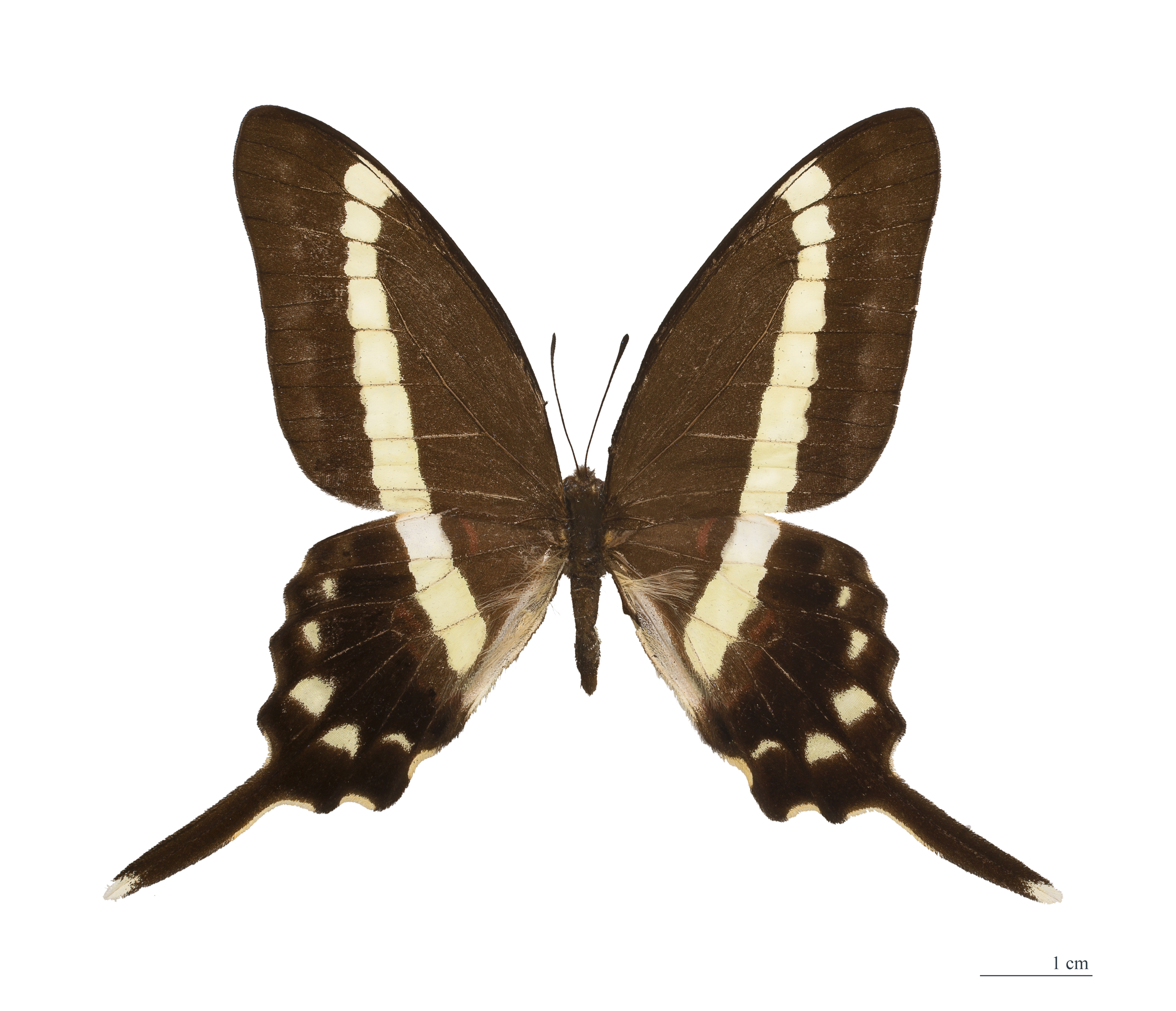
- Top view
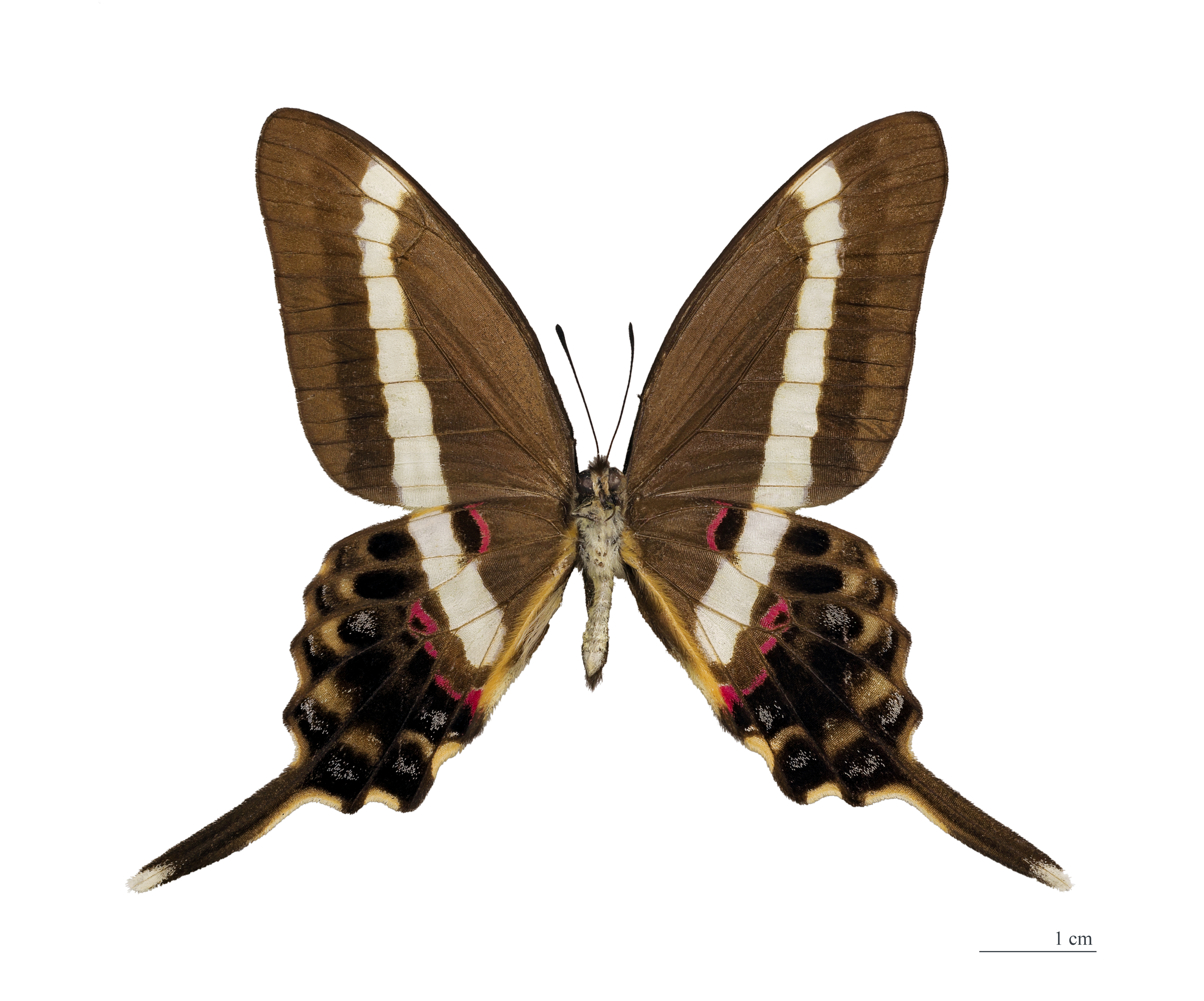
- Bottom view - MHNT

Scientific classification
- Kingdom: Animalia
- Phylum: Arthropoda
- Clade: Pancrustacea
- Class: Insecta
- Order: Lepidoptera
- Family: Papilionidae
- Genus: Graphium
- Species: G. illyris

Binomial name
- Graphium illyris (Hewitson, 1873)

Synonyms
- Papilio illyris Hewitson, 1873; Papilio illyris f. stictica Le Cerf, 1924; Papilio (Cosmodesmus) illyris ab. addenda Dufrane, 1946; Papilio illyris flavisparsus Fruhstorfer, 1903; Papilio illyris hamatus Joicey & Talbot, 1918

= Graphium illyris =

Species of butterfly

Graphium illyris, the cream-banded swordtail, is a forest butterfly of the swallowtail family (Papilionidae). It is native to the Afrotropical realm.

== Description ==
The markings of the upper surface yellow; the median band curved slightly basad at the costal margin of the forewing and without spot in cellule 7; the tail of the hindwing only white at the extreme tip; the hindwing with red-yellow marginal lunules. Ashanti to the Congo. — ab. (var. ?) flavisparsus Fruhst. has the submarginal spots of the hindwing and the red spots on the under surface larger than in the normal form. Island of Fernando Po. External images from Royal Museum of Central Africa.

== Habitat ==
Tropical and subtropical ecoregions.

== Status and biology ==
It is an uncommon to rare species and is seasonal in West Africa (with adults on wing mainly in February and March). Males mud-puddle, and are attracted to rotten fish as well as perspiration on humans.

== Subspecies ==
- G. i. illyris (Sierra Leone, Liberia, Ivory Coast, C.Ghana)
- G. i. flavisparsus (Fruhstorfer, 1903) (Equatorial Guinea)
- G. i. girardeaui (Guilbot & Plantrou, 1978) (Central African Republic)
- G. i. hamatus (Joicey & Talbot, 1918) (Nigeria, Cameroon, Equatorial Guinea, Gabon, Congo, Congo Republic, Tanzania)

Torben Larsen developed a species numbering system for his 2005 publication Butterflies of West Africa. The nominate subspecies is #30. The 'Larsen' numbers have since been used with permission in A Sharp Eye on Butterflies of Ghana.

== Taxonomy ==
Graphium illyris is a member of the antheus - clade Graphium antheus, Graphium colonna, Graphium evombar, Graphium kirbyi, Graphium junodi, Graphium polistratus, Graphium illyris, Graphium gudenusi).

== See also ==
- Upper Guinean forests

== Sources ==
- Guilbot, R. and Plantrou, J. (1978). Note sur Graphium illyris (Hewitson) et revision systematique de I'espece. Bulletin de la Societe Entomologique de France 83: 68–73.
- Smith, C.R. & Vane-Wright, R.I. 2001 A review of the Afrotropical species of the genus Graphium (Lepidoptera: Rhopalocera: Papilionidae) Bull. Nat. Hist. Mus. Ent. Ser. 70 (2): 503-719

iu
