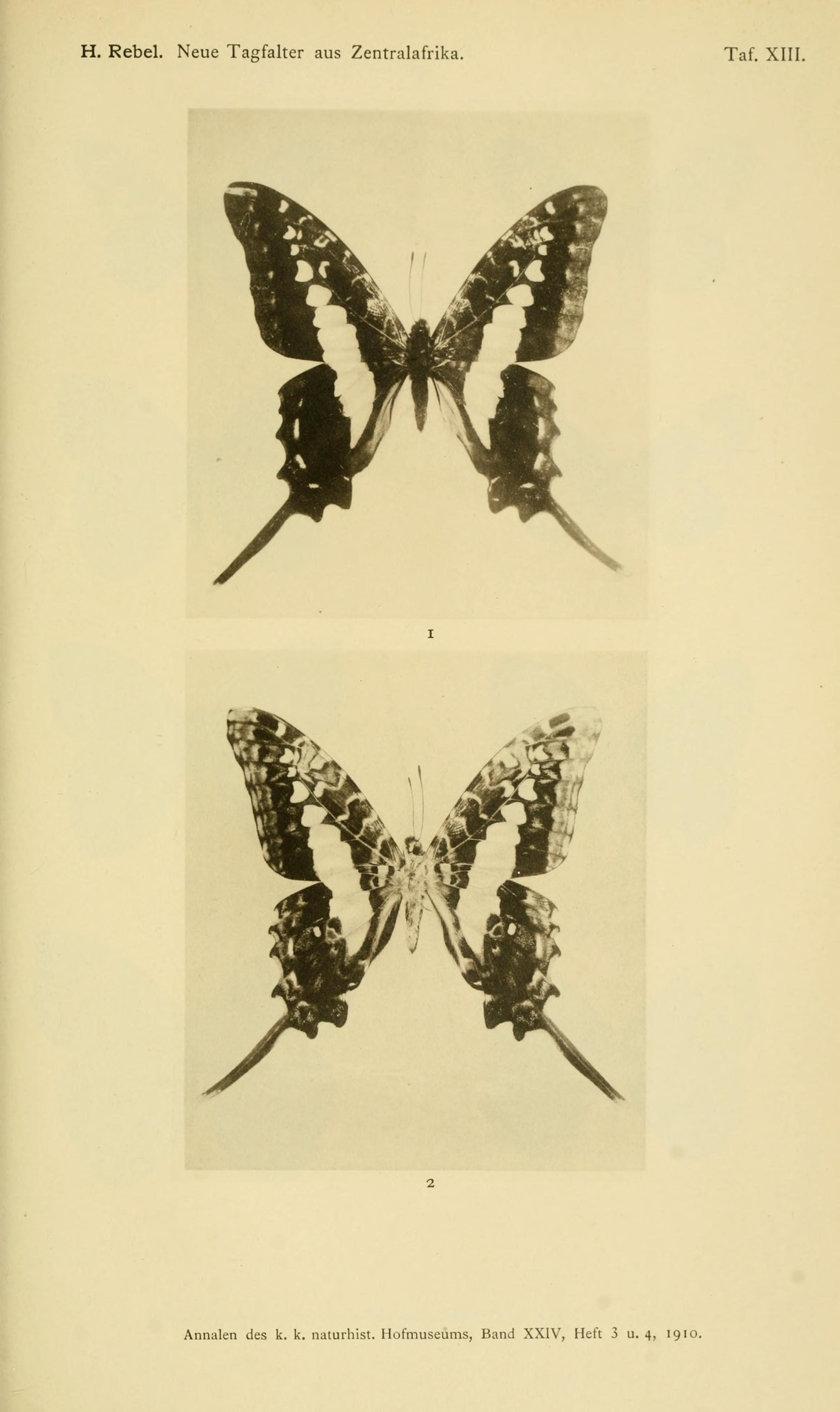
- Plate accompanying the original description, male, 1 upperside, 2 underside

Scientific classification
- Kingdom: Animalia
- Phylum: Arthropoda
- Clade: Pancrustacea
- Class: Insecta
- Order: Lepidoptera
- Family: Papilionidae
- Genus: Graphium
- Species: G. gudenusi

Binomial name
- Graphium gudenusi (Rebel, 1911)

Synonyms
- Papilio gudenusi Rebel, 1911; Graphium (Arisbe) gudenusi; Papilio babaulti Le Cerf, 1931

= Graphium gudenusi =

Species of butterfly

Graphium gudenusi is a butterfly in the family Papilionidae. It is found in the Democratic Republic of the Congo, Rwanda, Burundi and Uganda. Its habitat consists of forests. It is a generally scarce species. Males fly along the banks of forest streams and rivers, occasionally mudpuddling.

== Taxonomy ==
Graphium gudenusi is a member of the antheus - clade Graphium antheus, Graphium colonna, Graphium evombar, Graphium kirbyi, Graphium junodi, Graphium polistratus, Graphium illyris, Graphium gudenusi).

== Images ==
External images from Royal Museum of Central Africa.Images at gbif

== See also ==
- Bwindi Impenetrable National Park Habitat in Uganda
