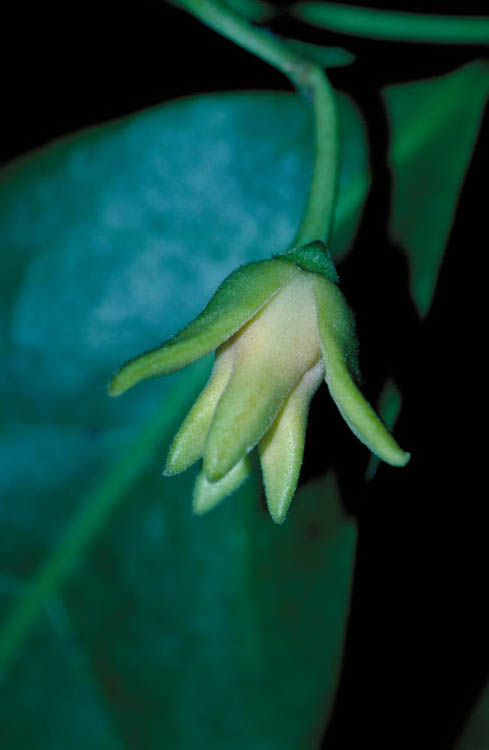
- Flower

Scientific classification
- Kingdom: Plantae
- Clade: Tracheophytes
- Clade: Angiosperms
- Clade: Magnoliids
- Order: Magnoliales
- Family: Annonaceae
- Genus: Artabotrys
- Species: A. carnosipetalus

Binomial name
- Artabotrys carnosipetalus Jessup

= Artabotrys carnosipetalus =

Species of flowering plant

Artabotrys carnosipetalus is a species of plants in the custard apple family Annonaceae found only in Cape York Peninsula, Queensland, Australia. It is a vine with a stem diameter of up to 5 cm (2.0 in), with simple leaves arranged alternately on the twigs. They may reach up to 20 cm (7.9 in) long by 6 cm (2.4 in) wide and have 5–8 pairs of lateral veins either side of the midrib. The flowers are fragrant, solitary and about 10 mm (0.39 in) wide, with 3 sepals and 6 petals in two whorls of 3. The fruit is an apocarp, the individual carpels about 30 mm (1.2 in) long and 20 mm (0.8 in) wide. The species was first described in 2007 by Australian botanist Laurence W. Jessup.

== Conservation ==
This species is listed as least concern under the Queensland Government's Nature Conservation Act. As of 12 January 2025, it has not been assessed by the International Union for Conservation of Nature (IUCN).
