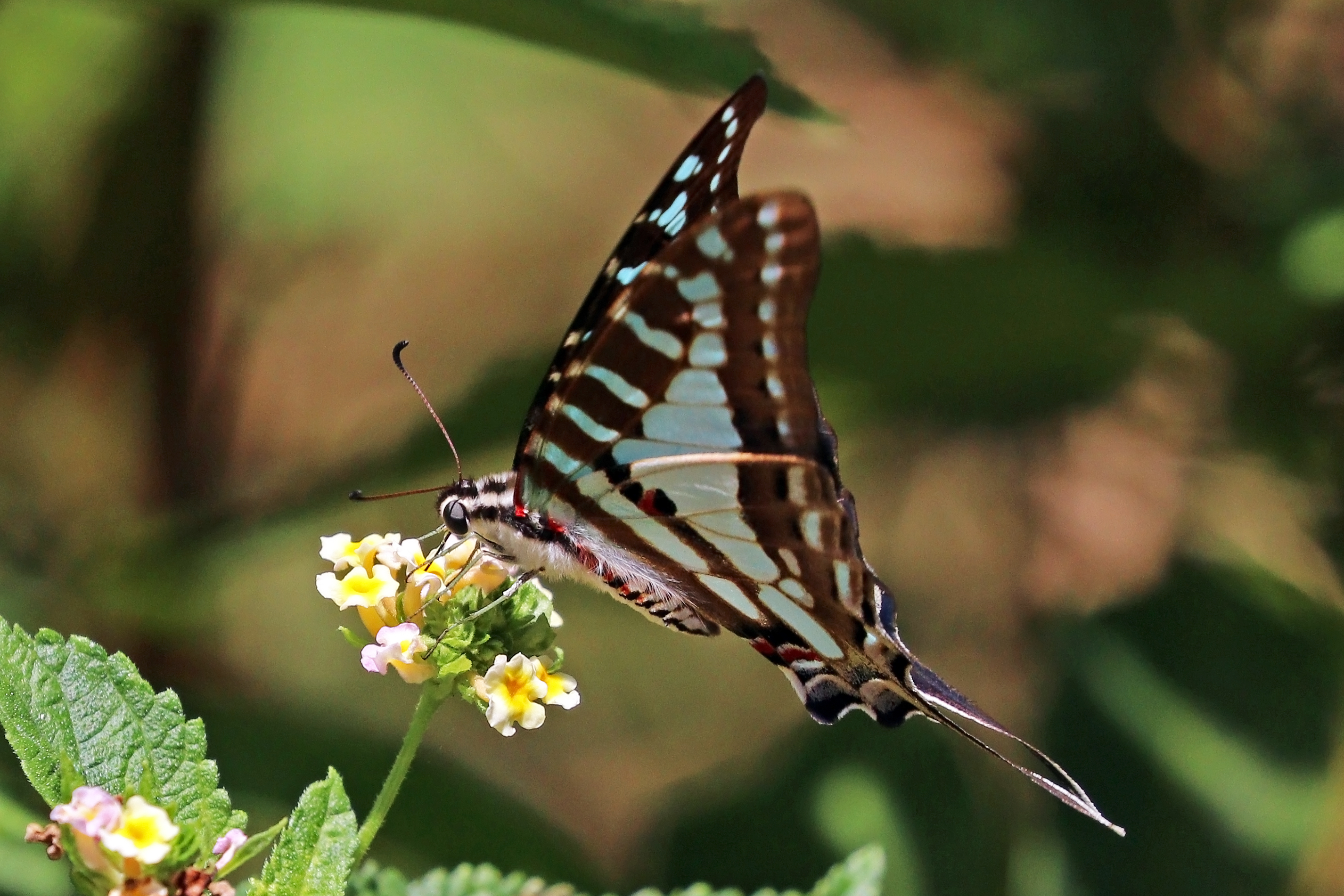
- male, Ankarana Reserve, Madagascar
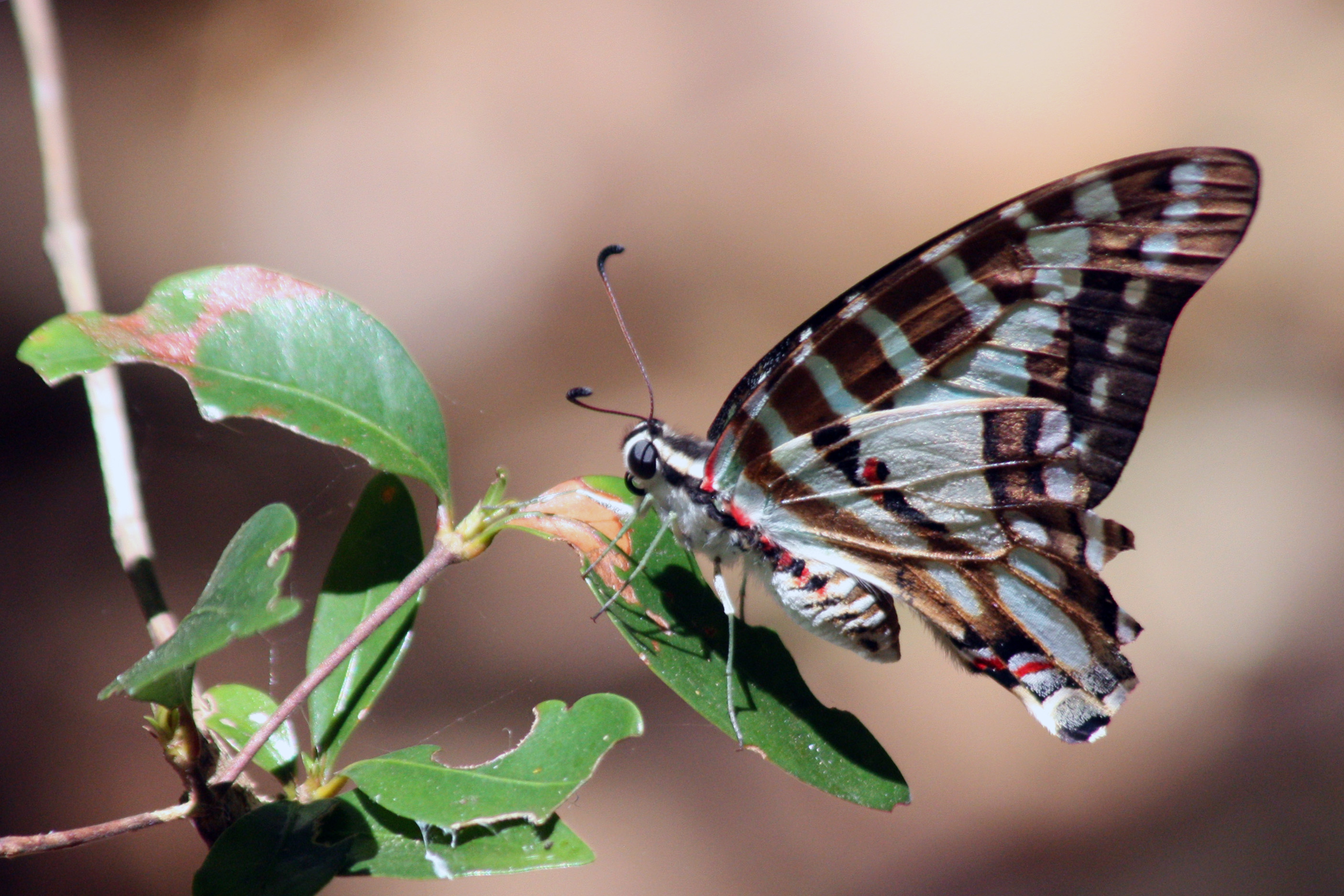
- Tailless female in Anjajavy Forest, Madagascar

Scientific classification
- Kingdom: Animalia
- Phylum: Arthropoda
- Clade: Pancrustacea
- Class: Insecta
- Order: Lepidoptera
- Family: Papilionidae
- Genus: Graphium
- Species: G. evombar

Binomial name
- Graphium evombar (Boisduval, 1836)

Synonyms
- Papilio evombar Boisduval, 1836; Graphium (Arisbe) evombar

= Graphium evombar =

Species of butterfly

Graphium evombar is a butterfly in the family Papilionidae. It is found on Madagascar and the Comoros. The habitat consists of forests.

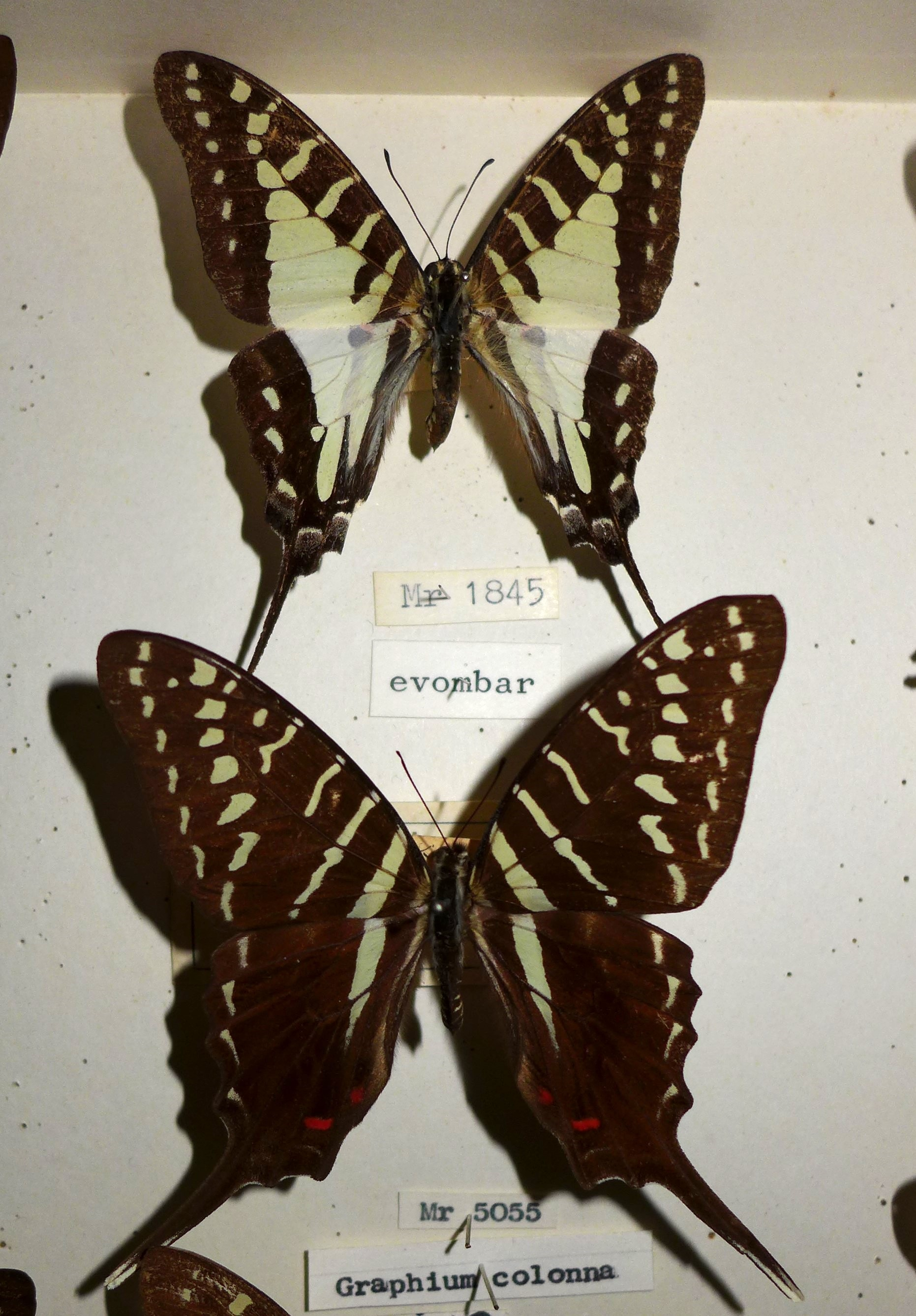

== Description ==
Markings of the upper surface greenish white; the middle cell of the forewing with 5 almost straight transverse bars; the second, which as usual is prolonged posteriorly, confluent at the hindmargin with the discal spot of cellule 1 a; the spot in the apex of the cell of the hindwing above completely or almost completely united with the median band; the discal spots of cellules 2 to 4 of the forewing completely fill up the base of the cellules; the hindwing above without red spots. Madagascar.

== Subspecies ==
- Graphium evombar evombar (Madagascar)
- Graphium evombar viossati Collins, 1997 (Comoros)

== Taxonomy ==
Graphium evombar is a member of the antheus - clade Graphium antheus, Graphium colonna, Graphium evombar, Graphium kirbyi, Graphium junodi, Graphium polistratus, Graphium illyris, Graphium gudenusi).

Aurivillius in Seitz places evombar and antheus in the policenes Group Subgroup 1 circumscribed-Hindwing with a long, narrow tail of uniform width at vein 4. Frons black with white lateral margins. Wings above with green or greenish white markings. Cell of the forewing with 5 — 6 transverse bands or spots.Both wings with submarginal spots. Hindwing beneath with a so-called ornamental band, formed of red spots. Besides the markings already mentioned the forewing has a spot at the base of cellules 1 a and 1 b, an oblique transverse streak in the basal part of these cellules and 8 discal spots, one each in cellules 1 a — 6 and 8; the hindwing has a narrow transverse band at the base, a narrow median band which consists only of three spots (in the cell and in cellules 2 and 7) and usually also 7 discal spots in cellules 1 c -7, of which, however, that in 1 c is red. The larva has four pairs of spines, one pair each on the 1., 2., 3. and penultimate segments. The pupa is very angularly widened at the beginning of the abdomen and has a long hump on the mesothorax. Subgroup 1.Hindwing in the apex of the cell with an additional light spot which is sometimes more or less united with the spot of the median band. The discal spot in cellule 3 of the hindwing is elongated and nearly or quite reaches the base of the cellule. Wings beneath spotted with red at the extreme basal margin. Cell of the forewing behind the fifth transverse streak unicolorous, without spots.
