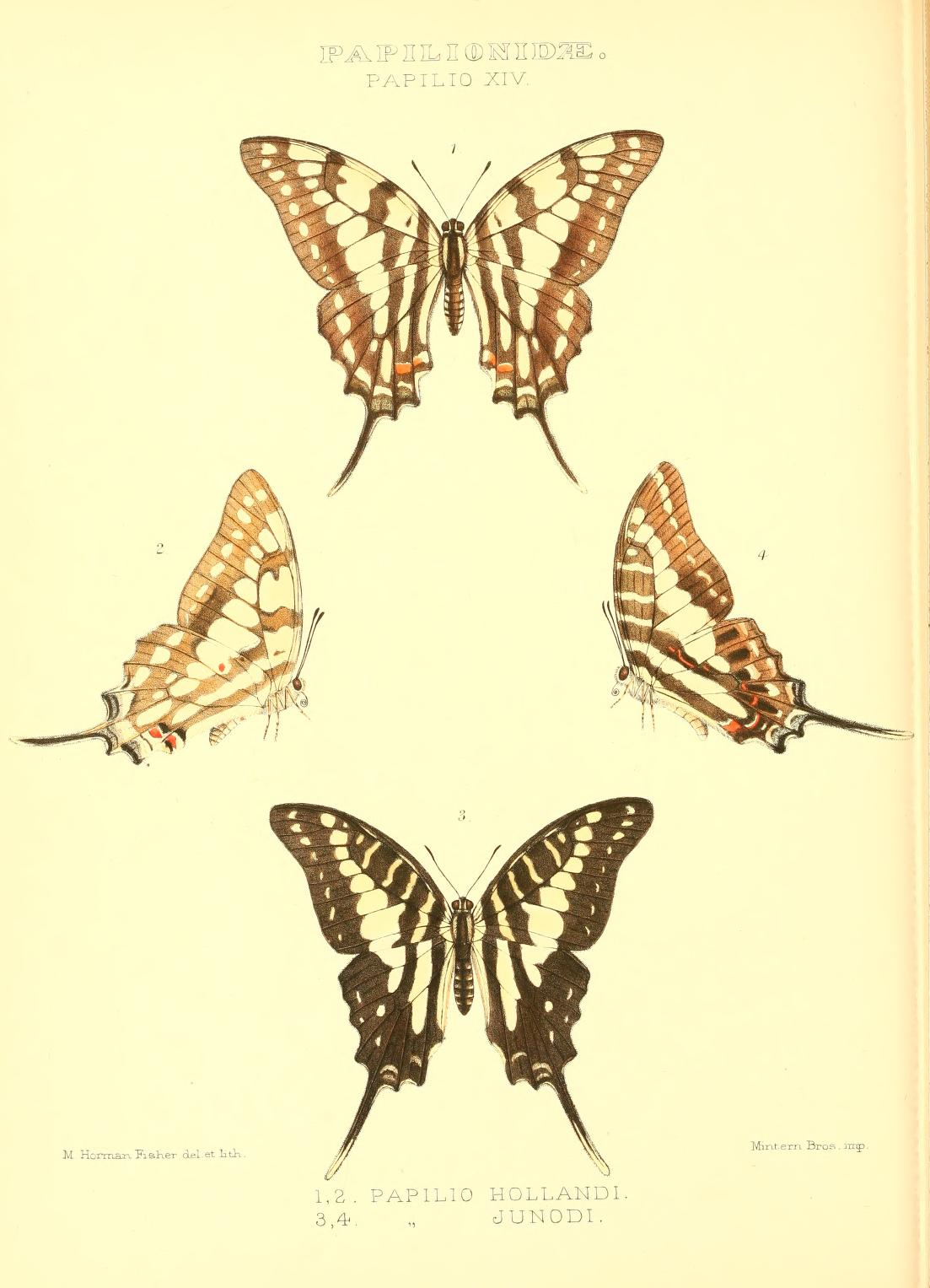
- Figures 3 and 4

Scientific classification
- Kingdom: Animalia
- Phylum: Arthropoda
- Clade: Pancrustacea
- Class: Insecta
- Order: Lepidoptera
- Family: Papilionidae
- Genus: Graphium
- Species: G. junodi

Binomial name
- Graphium junodi (Trimen, 1893)

Synonyms
- Papilio junodi Trimen, 1893; Graphium (Arisbe) junodi

= Graphium junodi =

Species of butterfly

Graphium junodi, the Junod's swordtail, is a butterfly in the family Papilionidae. It is found in Angola, the Democratic Republic of the Congo, Uganda, Tanzania, Mozambique and along the eastern border of Zimbabwe. The habitat consists of warm forests.

== Description ==
Very nearly allied to Graphium polistratus and only differing from it in that the markings of the upper surface are greenish white, the basal spot of cellule 2 of the hindwing is large also beneath, the submarginal spots on the upperside of the hindwing and in cellules lb to 5 of the forewing are very small or absent; of the discal spots of the hindwing those of cellules 2 and 3 are completely absent, those of cellules 4 and 5 are small and the one in cellule 6 is rather large, rounded posteriorly. Delagoa Bay. External images from Royal Museum for Central Africa

== Biology ==
Adults are on wing from July to September and from January to April.

== Taxonomy ==
Graphium junodi is a member of the antheus - clade Graphium antheus, Graphium colonna, Graphium evombar, Graphium kirbyi, Graphium junodi, Graphium polistratus, Graphium illyris, Graphium gudenusi).

Aurivillius in Seitz places junodi, nigrescens (policenoides), policenes, porthaon, sisenna and collona in the Policenes Group Subgroup 2 circumscribed Hindwing with a long, narrow tail of uniform width at vein 4. Frons black with white lateral margins. Wings above with green or greenish white markings. Cell of the forewing with 5 — 6 transverse bands or spots. Both wings with submarginal spots. Hindwing beneath with a so-called ornamental band, formed of red spots. Besides the markings already mentioned the forewing has a spot at the base of cellules 1 a and 1 b, an oblique transverse streak in the basal part of these cellules and 8 discal spots, one each in cellules 1 a — 6 and 8; the hindwing has a narrow transverse band at the base, a narrow median band which consists only of three spots (in the cell and in cellules 2 and 7) and usually also 7 discal spots in cellules 1 c -7, of 'which, however, that in 1 c is red. The larva has four pairs of spines, one pair each on the 1., 2., 3. and penultimate segments. The pupa is very angularly widened at the beginning of the abdomen and has a long hump on the mesothorax. Subgroup 2.The apical fourth of the cell of the hindwing above unicolorous black without light spot. The cell of the forewing with a light spot or dot at the costal margin close before the apex.

== Etymology ==
The name honours Henri-Alexandre Junod.

== See also ==
- Chimanimani Mountains Habitat in Mozambique
