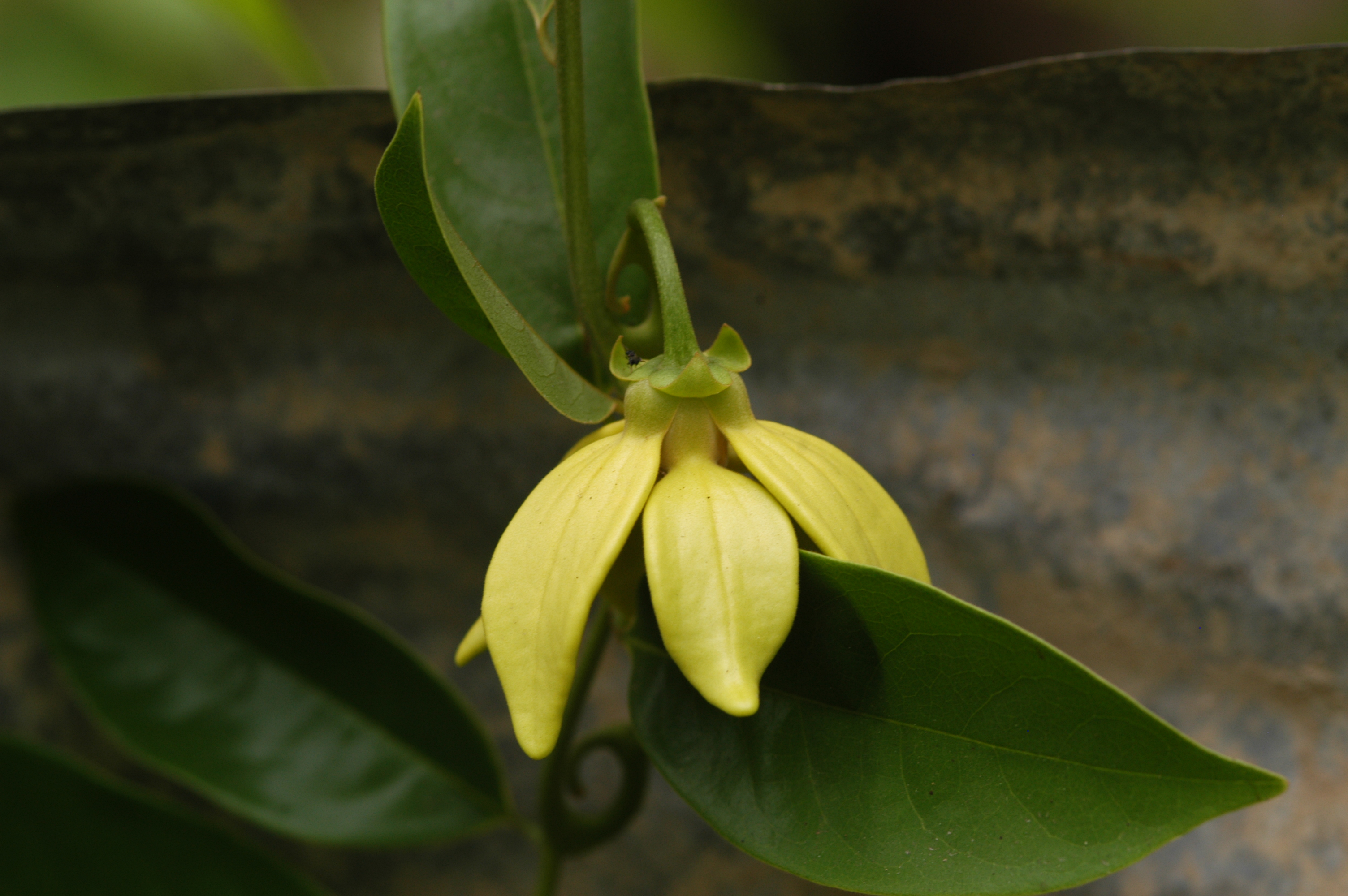
- Artabotrys hexapetalus flower

Scientific classification
- Kingdom: Plantae
- Clade: Tracheophytes
- Clade: Angiosperms
- Clade: Magnoliids
- Order: Magnoliales
- Family: Annonaceae
- Genus: Artabotrys
- Species: A. hexapetalus

Binomial name
- Artabotrys hexapetalus (L.f.) Bhandari

Synonyms
- 16 synonyms: Annona hexapetala L.f.; Annona uncinata Lam.; Anona uncinata Lam.; Artabotrys hamatus (Dunal) Blume; Artabotrys intermedius Hassk.; Artabotrys odoratissimus R.Br.; Artabotrys uncata (Lour.) Baill.; Artabotrys uncatus (Lour.) Baill.; Artabotrys uncinatus (Lam.) Merr.; Unona esculenta Dunal; Unona hamata Blume; Unona uncata (Lour.) Dunal; Unona uncinata Dunal; Uvaria esculenta Roxb. ex Rottler; Uvaria hamata Roxb.; Uvaria odoratissima Roxb.; Uvaria uncata Lour.

= Artabotrys hexapetalus =

Species of flowering plant

Artabotrys hexapetalus, the climbing ylang-ylang, is a shrub found in India through to Burma, southern China and Taiwan, having flowers that are renowned for their exotic fragrance. It is also called ylang-ylang vine or tail grape in English, with a variety of names in other languages. The yellow colored flowers of this plant are very fragrant. The flowers are greenish in the beginning and turn yellow with age. They are long lasting with a fruity pleasant smell. When young it is a shrub that turns into a climber once it attains the height of about 2 meters.

It is a large woody climber or half-scandent shrub and originated in South China, Burma (Myanmar), the Philippines and India. Its flowers are axillary, solitary, or in clusters of two or three, greenish yellow in color when ripe and give a strong smell resembling that of ripened jackfruit. Hence its name in Bengali is 'Kanthali champa' (jackfruit-champa). It flowers almost all year but more during the summer and the rains. It is unsuitable for small gardens because of its huge size. It needs pruning to keep it in shape. Propagation is from seeds or layers.

== Gallery ==
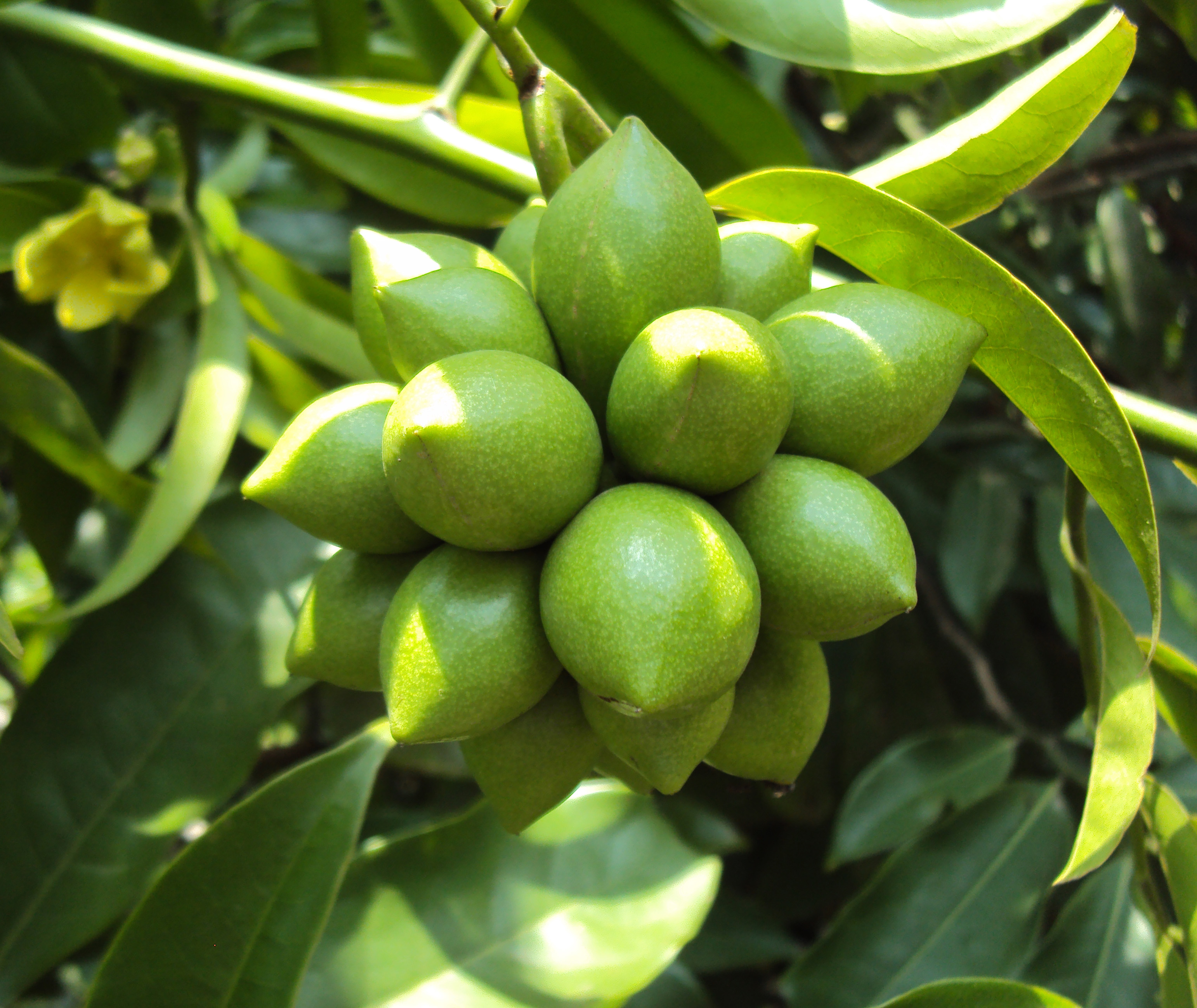
Fruits

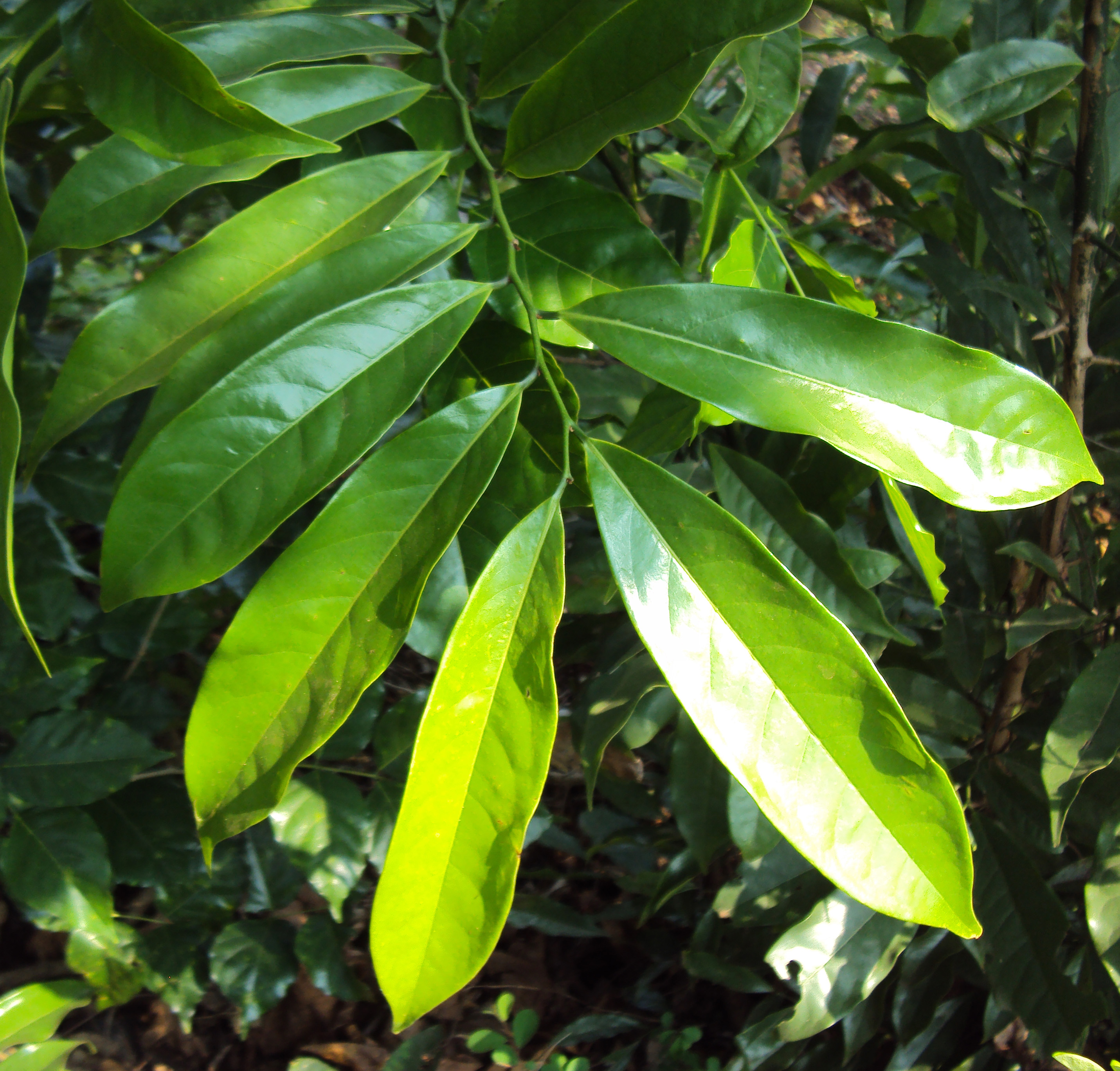
Leaves

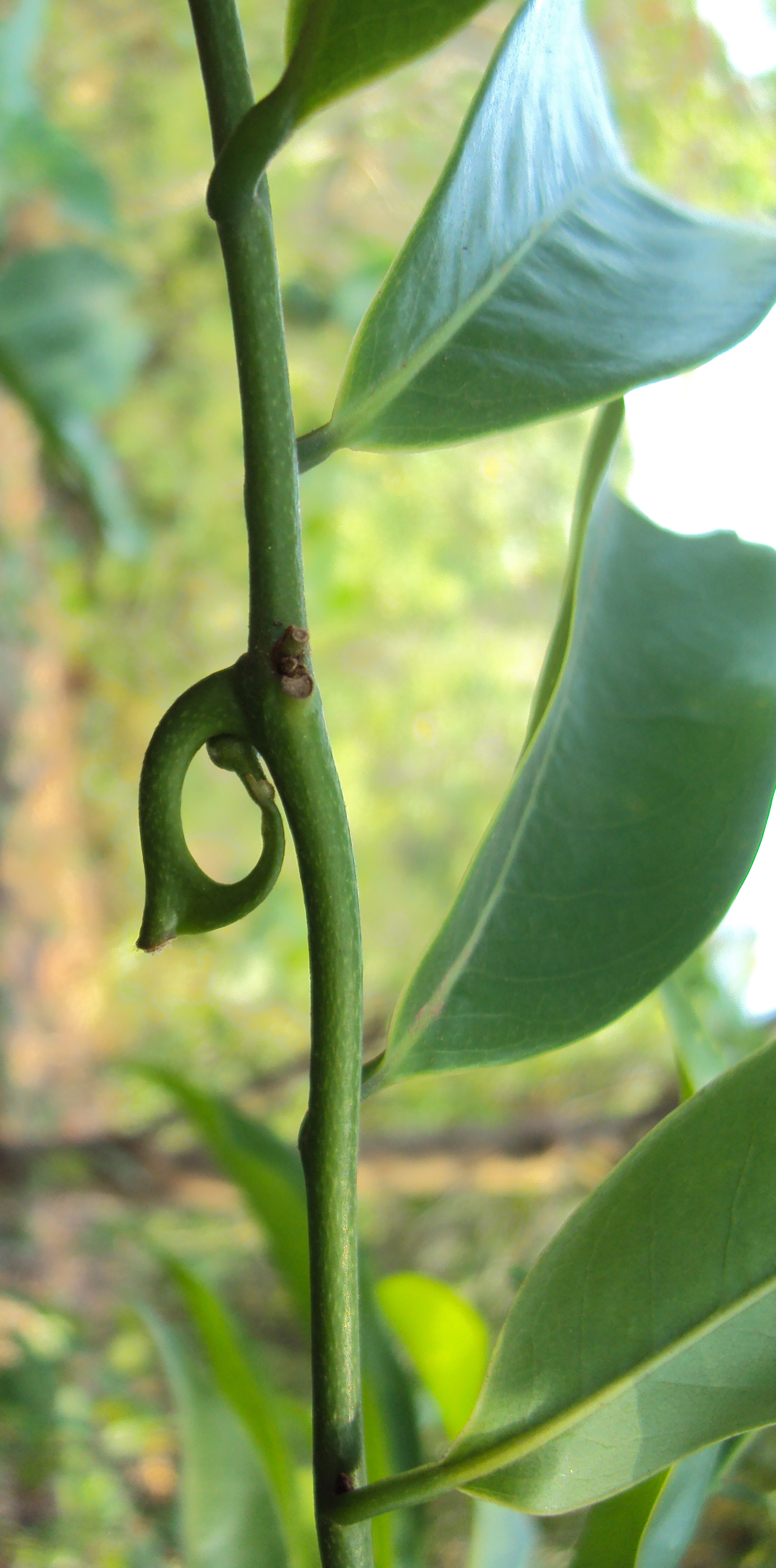
Hook

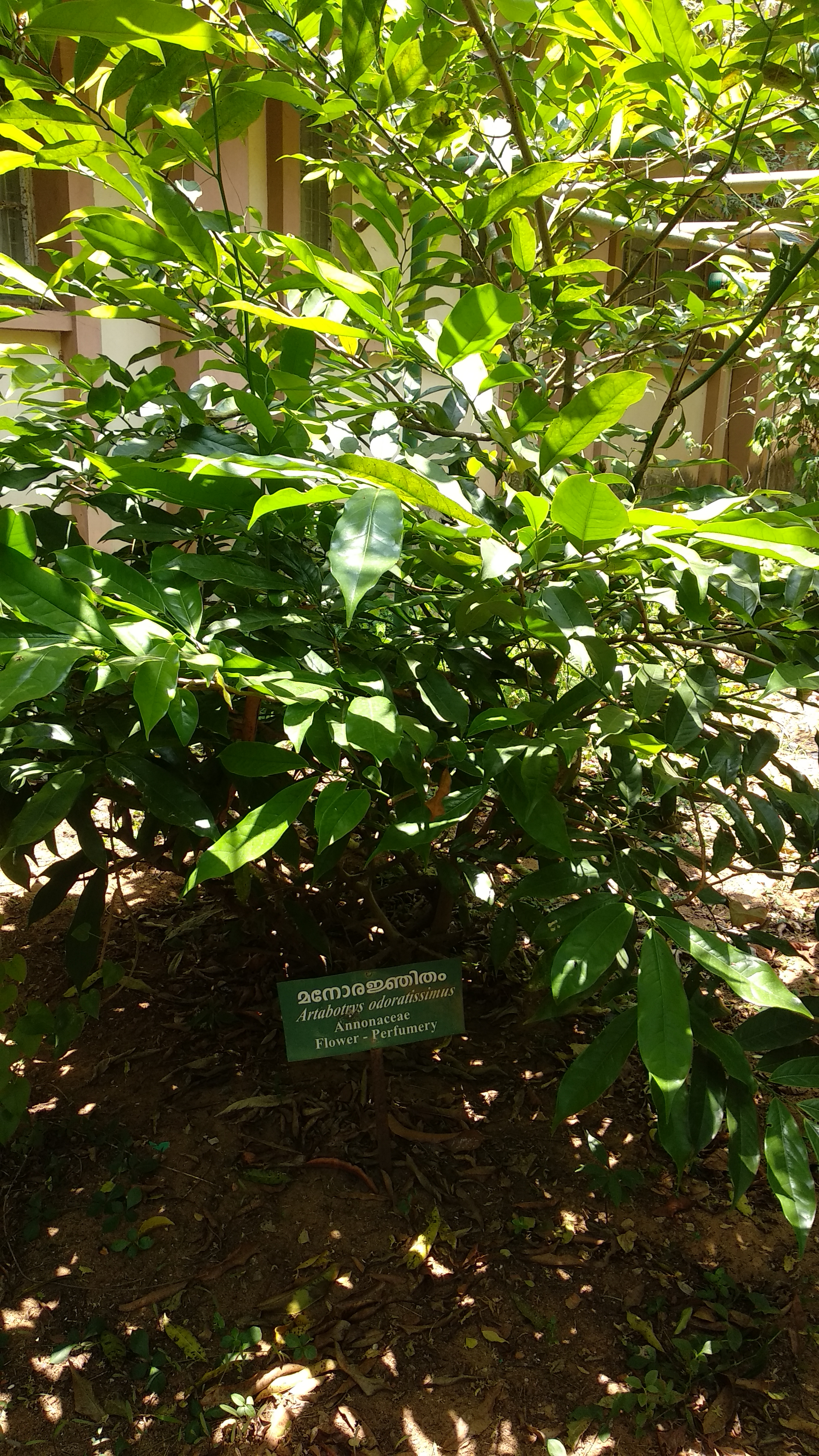

== See also ==
- Cananga odorata, tree which is the source of ylang-ylang oil.
- Desmos chinensis, dwarf ylang-ylang.
