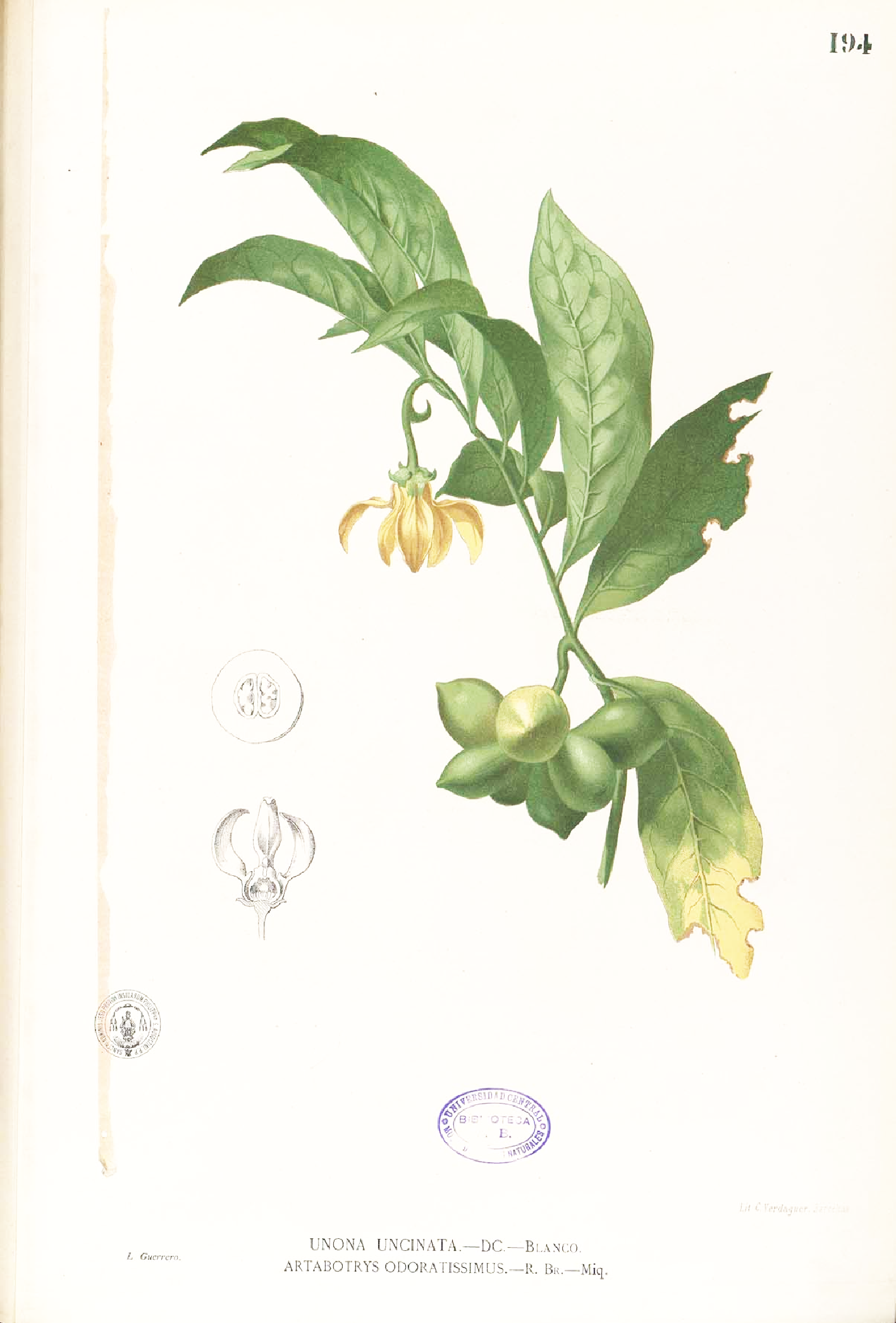
- Artabotrys hexapetalus

Scientific classification
- Kingdom: Plantae
- Clade: Tracheophytes
- Clade: Angiosperms
- Clade: Magnoliids
- Order: Magnoliales
- Family: Annonaceae
- Subfamily: Annonoideae
- Tribe: Xylopieae
- Genus: Artabotrys; R.Br.

Synonyms
- Ropalopetalum Griff.

= Artabotrys =

Genus of flowering plants

Artabotrys is a genus of plants in the custard apple family Annonaceae. It is native to areas from Africa through Southeast Asia to Australia.

== Description ==
Plants in Artabotrys are scandent shrubs or woody lianas. The flowers are borne singly or in small clusters, the peduncles of which also serve as hooks to assist climbing. The flowers are bisexual, i.e. with both male and female reproductive organs, and have six petals in two whorls of three. They have numerous stamens, and the carpels (the female structure comprising the ovary, style and stigma) number from two to many. The fruit is apocarpous, with all ripened carpels clustered together.

== Distribution ==
The genus is native to the following regions as defined in the World Geographical Scheme for Recording Plant Distributions:

- East Tropical Africa – Kenya, Tanzania, Uganda
- Northeast Tropical Africa – Ethiopia, Sudan
- South Tropical Africa – Angola, Malawi, Mozambique, Zambia, Zimbabwe
- Southern Africa – Botswana, Caprivi Strip, KwaZulu-Natal, Northern Provinces, Swaziland
- West Tropical Africa – Benin, Ghana, Guinea, Guinea-Bissau, Ivory Coast, Liberia, Nigeria, Senegal, Sierra Leone, Togo
- West-Central Tropical Africa – Burundi, Cabinda, Cameroon, Central African Republic, Congo, Gabon, Gulf of Guinea Is., Rwanda, Zaire
- Western Indian Ocean – Comoros, Madagascar
- China – China South-Central, China Southeast, Hainan
- Indian Subcontinent – Assam, Bangladesh, East Himalaya, India, Sri Lanka
- Indo-China – Andaman Is., Cambodia, Laos, Myanmar, Nicobar Is., Thailand, Vietnam
- Malesia – Borneo, Jawa, Lesser Sunda Is., Malaya, Maluku, Philippines, Sulawesi, Sumatera
- Papuasia – New Guinea
- Australia – Queensland

== Species ==
As of October 2026, Plants of the World Online accepts 111 species, as follows:

- Artabotrys aereus Ast
- Artabotrys antunesii Engl. & Diels
- Artabotrys arachnoides J.Sinclair
- Artabotrys atractocarpus I.M.Turner
- Artabotrys aurantiacus Engl.
- Artabotrys blumei Hook.f. & Thomson
- Artabotrys brachypetalus Benth.
- Artabotrys brevipes Craib
- Artabotrys burmanicus A.DC.
- Artabotrys byrsophyllus I.M.Turner & Utteridge
- Artabotrys cagayanensis Merr.
- Artabotrys camptopetalus Diels
- Artabotrys carnosipetalus Jessup
- Artabotrys caudatus Wall. ex Hook.f. & Thomson
- Artabotrys chitkokoi K.Z.Hein, Naive & J.Chen
- Artabotrys coccineus Keay
- Artabotrys collinus Hutch.
- Artabotrys congolensis De Wild. & T.Durand
- Artabotrys costatus King
- Artabotrys crassifolius Hook.f. & Thomson
- Artabotrys crassipetalus Pellegr.
- Artabotrys cumingianus S.Vidal
- Artabotrys darainensis Deroin & L.Gaut.
- Artabotrys dielsianus Le Thomas
- Artabotrys fragrans Jovet-Ast
- Artabotrys gossweileri Baker f.
- Artabotrys gracilis King
- Artabotrys grandifolius King
- Artabotrys hainanensis R.E.Fr.
- Artabotrys harmandii Finet & Gagnep.
- Artabotrys hexapetalus (L.f.) Bhandari - type species
- Artabotrys hienianus Bân
- Artabotrys hildebrandtii O.Hoffm.
- Artabotrys hirtipes Ridl.
- Artabotrys hispidus Sprague & Hutch.
- Artabotrys inodorus Zipp.
- Artabotrys insignis Engl. & Diels
- Artabotrys insurae Junhao Chen & Eiadthong
- Artabotrys jacques-felicis Pellegr.
- Artabotrys javanicus I.M.Turner
- Artabotrys jollyanus Pierre
- Artabotrys kinabaluensis I.M.Turner
- Artabotrys kurzii Hook.f. & Thomson
- Artabotrys lanuginosus Boerl.
- Artabotrys lastoursvillensis Pellegr.
- Artabotrys letestui Pellegr.
- Artabotrys libericus Diels
- Artabotrys likimensis De Wild.
- Artabotrys longipetalus Junhao Chen & Eiadthong
- Artabotrys longistigmatus Nurainas
- Artabotrys lowianus King
- Artabotrys luteus Elmer
- Artabotrys luxurians Ghesq. ex Cavaco & Keraudr.
- Artabotrys macrophyllus Hook.f.
- Artabotrys macropodus I.M.Turner
- Artabotrys madagascariensis Miq.
- Artabotrys maingayi Hook.f. & Thomson
- Artabotrys manoranjanii M.V.Ramana, J.Swamy & K.C.Mohan
- Artabotrys modestus Diels
- Artabotrys monteiroae Oliv.
- Artabotrys multiflorus C.E.C.Fisch.
- Artabotrys nicobarianus D.Das
- Artabotrys oblanceolatus Craib
- Artabotrys oblongus King
- Artabotrys ochropetalus I.M.Turner
- Artabotrys oliganthus Engl. & Diels
- Artabotrys oxycarpus King
- Artabotrys pachypetalus B.Xue & Junhao Chen
- Artabotrys pallens Ast
- Artabotrys palustris Louis ex Boutique
- Artabotrys pandanicarpus I.M.Turner
- Artabotrys parkinsonii Chatterjee
- Artabotrys petelotii Merr.
- Artabotrys phuongianus Bân
- Artabotrys pierreanus Engl. & Diels
- Artabotrys pilosus Merr. & Chun
- Artabotrys pleurocarpus Maingay ex Hook.f. & Thomson
- Artabotrys polygynus Miq.
- Artabotrys porphyrifolius Nurainas
- Artabotrys punctulatus C.Y.Wu
- Artabotrys rhynchocarpus C.Y.Wu
- Artabotrys roseus Boerl.
- Artabotrys rubriflorus Y.Qian Liu, B.Xiao & X.L.Hou
- Artabotrys rufus De Wild.
- Artabotrys rupestris Diels
- Artabotrys sahyadricus Robi, K.M.P.Kumar & Hareesh
- Artabotrys sarawakensis I.M.Turner
- Artabotrys scortechinii King
- Artabotrys scytophyllus (Diels) Cavaco & Keraudren
- Artabotrys sericeus Sujana & Vadhyar
- Artabotrys siamensis Miq.
- Artabotrys spathulatus Jun H.Chen, Chalermglin & R.M.K.Saunders
- Artabotrys speciosus Kurz ex Hook.f. & Thomson
- Artabotrys spinosus Craib
- Artabotrys suaveolens (Blume) Blume
- Artabotrys sumatranus Miq.
- Artabotrys tanaosriensis Jun H.Chen, Chalermglin & R.M.K.Saunders
- Artabotrys taynguyenensis Bân
- Artabotrys tetramerus Bân
- Artabotrys thomsonii Oliv.
- Artabotrys tipulifer I.M.Turner & Utteridge
- Artabotrys tomentosus Nurainas
- Artabotrys uniflorus (Griff.) Craib
- Artabotrys veldkampii I.M.Turner
- Artabotrys velutinus Scott Elliot
- Artabotrys venustus King
- Artabotrys vidalianus Elmer
- Artabotrys vietnamensis Bân
- Artabotrys vinhensis Ast
- Artabotrys wrayi King
- Artabotrys zeylanicus Hook.f. & Thomson
