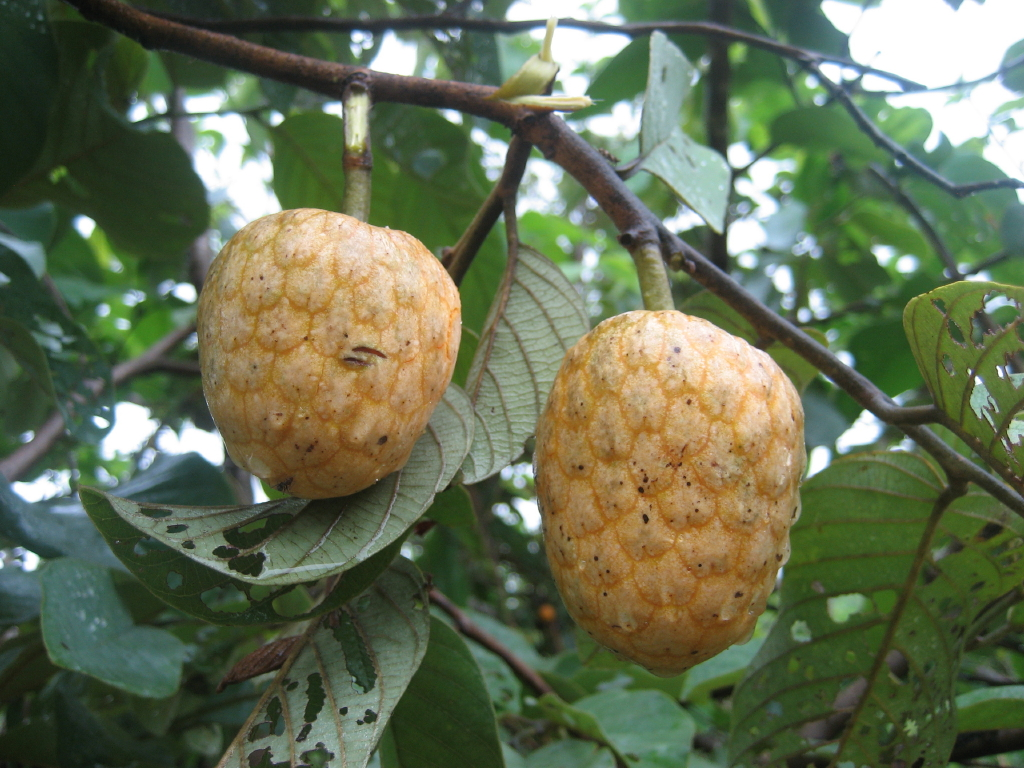
- Annona senegalensis fruit on a stem, with leaves near Fada N'gourma in Burkina Faso.

Conservation status
- Least Concern (IUCN 3.1)

Scientific classification
- Kingdom: Plantae
- Clade: Tracheophytes
- Clade: Angiosperms
- Clade: Magnoliids
- Order: Magnoliales
- Family: Annonaceae
- Genus: Annona
- Species: A. senegalensis

Binomial name
- Annona senegalensis Pers.

= Annona senegalensis =

Species of plant

Annona senegalensis, commonly known as African custard-apple, wild custard apple, wild soursop, abo ibobo (Yoruba language), sunkungo (Mandinka language), Gwandan daji (Hausa language) and dorgot (Wolof language) is a species of flowering plant in the custard apple family, Annonaceae. The specific epithet, senegalensis, translates to mean "of Senegal", the country where the type specimen was collected.

A traditional food plant in Africa, the fruits of A. senegalensis have the potential to improve nutrition, boost food security, foster rural development and support sustainable land care. Well known where it grows naturally, it is largely unheard of elsewhere.

== Description ==
Annona senegalensis takes the form of either a shrub or small tree, growing between two and six meters tall. Occasionally, it may become as tall as 11 m.

- It has bark of smooth or coarse texture, that can be a gray-silver or gray-brown. It is leaf-scarred, with nearly round flaking, showing lighter-hued spaces of under bark.
- Branches have thick, gray, brown or yellow tomentum when new, but this is later shed with age.
- Its green to blue-green leaves are alternate, simple, oblong to ovate to elliptic, from 6–18.5 long by 2.5–11.5 cm wide, with upper sides nearly hairless, but often hairy on the undersides, green to reddish, aracnose veins on both surfaces, with rounded to slightly notched apices. The leaf base is squared or barely lobeliar. The leaf margin is entire. Stout petioles are 0.5–2.5 cm long.
- Flowers mature to up to 3 cm in diameter, on 2 cm stalks, either singular, or two to four, ascending from the leaf axils. Six thick, creamy or xanthate petals display in double whorls, and green on the outside, but either creamy or sanguine within; each is roughly 0.8–1.5 by 0.9–1.1 centimetres (0.31–0.59 by 0.35–0.43 in), hairless or somewhat fuzzy. Petals' inner whorls curve over its stamens and ovary, three loose sepals are ovalish, and smaller than the petals (3–4 by 4–5 mm). The stamens range from 1.7 to 2.5 millimetres (0.067 to 0.098 in) long. The plant flowers from approximately April through June.
- Its pollen is shed as permanent tetrads.
- Fruits are formed of numerous fused, fleshy, bumpy, ovaform or globular carpels about 2.5–5 by 2.5–4 centimetres (0.98–1.97 by 0.98–1.57 in). They are green when young, ripening to yellow, and eventually to orange, packed with many burnt-orange-colored, oblong, cylindrical seeds. The fruit stalk is 1.5–5 centimetres (0.59–1.97 in) long.

A. senegalensis is generally pollinated by several species of beetle, but can be hand pollinated when grown as a crop plant. Its seed viability usually lasts no more than six months.

== Habitat ==
A. senegalensis tends to grow in semiarid to subhumid regions adjacent to the coast, often, but not exclusively, on coral-based rocks with mostly sandy, loamy soils, from sea level up to 2400 meters, at mean temperatures between 17 and 30 °C, and mean rainfall between 700 and 2,500 millimetres (28 and 98 in). They are often solitary plants within woodland savannah understory, also frequently in swamp forests, or riverbanks, or on former cropland left fallow for an extended period.

== Distribution ==
A. senegalensis is native to tropical east and northeast, west and west-central, and southern Africa, as well as southern subtropical Africa, and islands in the western Indian Ocean. Within the nation of South Africa, it is found in KwaZulu-Natal, Limpopo, and Mpumalanga. In Zimbabwe it is widespread in the Bikita district.

A. senegalensis has become naturalized in parts of India. It is also found in the islands of Maldives.

== Uses ==
The primary use of this plant is for food, but it has applications in numerous aspects of human endeavor, and every part of the plant has properties and uses.

The flowers, leaves and fruit are edible and culinary: white fruit pulp has a mild, pineapple-like flavor. Flowers are added to spice or garnish meals; leaves are eaten by humans as vegetables, or grazed by livestock. Leaves are also part of the diet of the West African giraffe.

The leaves are also used to create a general health tonic, in the treatment of pneumonia, and as mattress and pillow stuffing. Specific to Sudan, leaves are boiled in the making of perfume.

Bark can be processed to produce yellow-brown dye, insecticide, or medicine for treating a wide array of ailments, including worms parasitic on the intestines or flesh (notably guinea worms), diarrhea, gastroenteritis, lung infections, toothaches, and even snakebites. Natural gum in the bark is used to close open wounds.

Roots are also used medicinally in treating a gamut of conditions, from dizziness and indigestion to chest colds to venereal diseases.

Suckering shoots provide binding fibers, and the malleable, pale brown to white wood is used to carve tool handles, or fashioned into poles. Wood ash is an admixture to chewing tobacco and snuff, and also in soap production as solvent.

The essential oils in the fruits and leaves are valued for their organic chemical constituents: car-3-ene (in fruit) and linalool (from leaves).

Certain parts of A. senegalensis are used in treating skin or eye disorders.

Many South Africans believe the roots can cure insanity. Some Mozambicans feed them to infants to wean them from their mother's breast.

== Anthracnose ==
Like other species within the genus Anonna, A. senegalensis is commonly afflicted by anthracnose, brought on by the fungal pathogen Colletotrichum gloesporioides, which leads to leaf drop, eventually followed by mummification of its fruit. Controls often employed against the disease include spray applications of fermate or Phygon.
