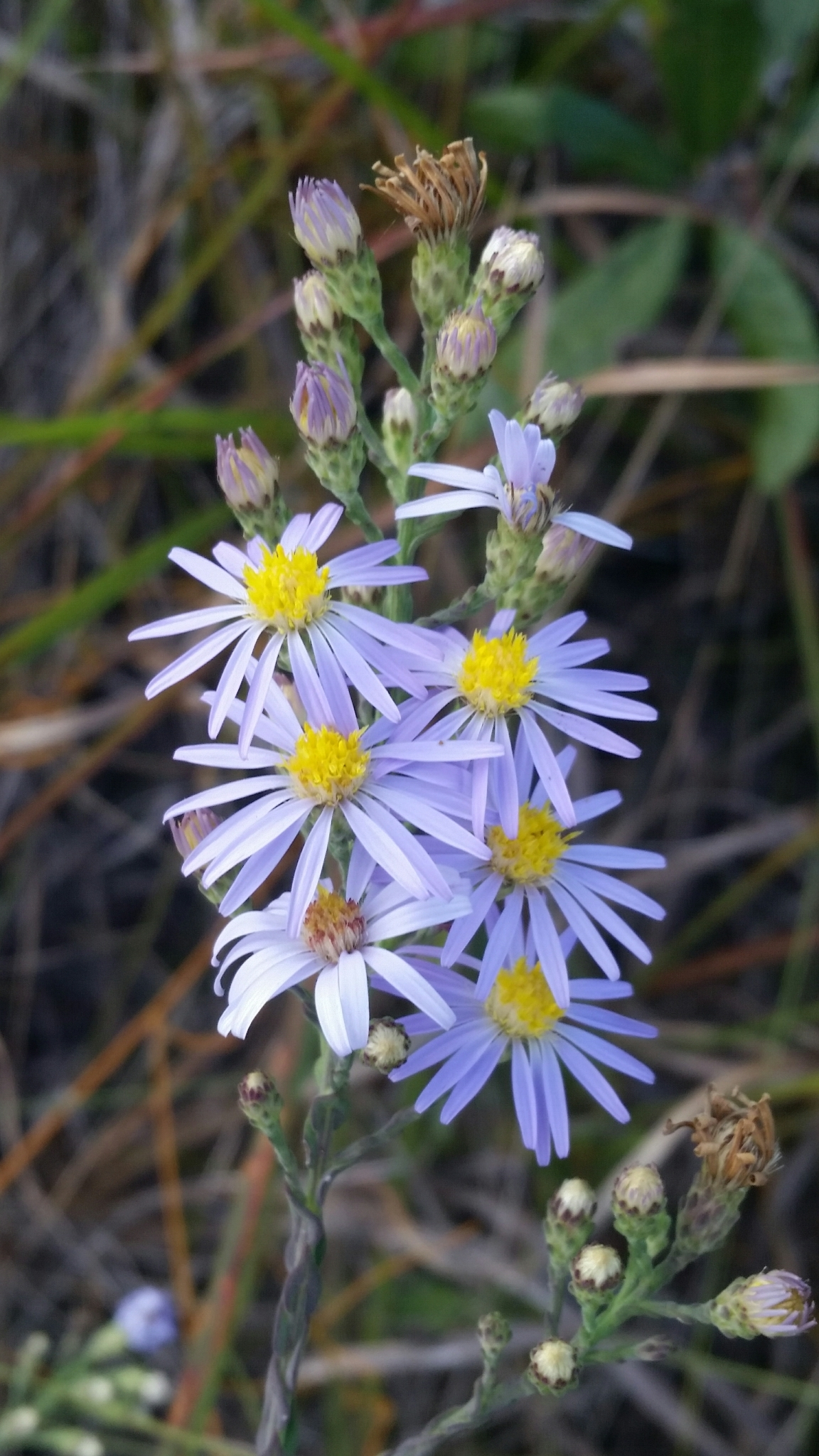

Conservation status
- Apparently Secure (NatureServe)

Scientific classification
- Kingdom: Plantae
- Clade: Tracheophytes
- Clade: Angiosperms
- Clade: Eudicots
- Clade: Asterids
- Order: Asterales
- Family: Asteraceae
- Tribe: Astereae
- Subtribe: Symphyotrichinae
- Genus: Symphyotrichum
- Subgenus: Symphyotrichum subg. Virgulus
- Section: Symphyotrichum sect. Patentes
- Species: S. adnatum

Binomial name
- Symphyotrichum adnatum (Nutt.) G.L.Nesom
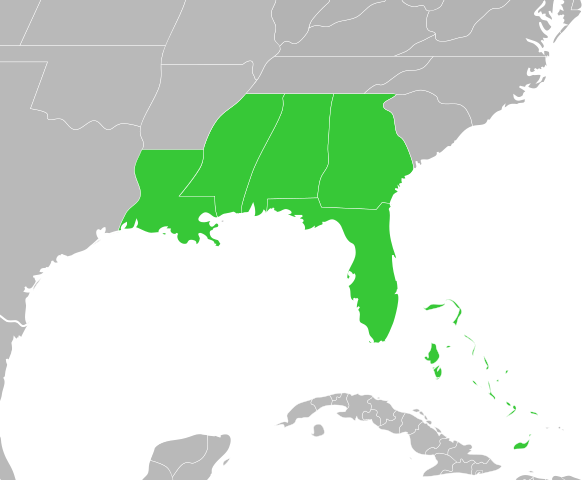
- Native distribution

Synonyms
- Aster adnatus Nutt.; Aster microphyllus Torr. ex Lindl.; Lasallea adnata (Nutt.) Semple & Brouillet; Virgulus adnatus (Nutt.) Reveal & Keener

= Symphyotrichum adnatum =

Species of plant in the aster family

Symphyotrichum adnatum (formerly Aster adnatus) is a species of flowering plant in the family Asteraceae native to the southeastern United States and the Bahamas. It is a perennial, herbaceous plant that may reach 30 to 120 centimeters (1 to 4 feet) tall with flowers that have lavender ray florets and yellow disk florets. The common name scaleleaf aster has been used for this species.

== Description ==
Symphyotrichum adnatum is a perennial, herbaceous, cespitose flowering plant that may reach heights between 30 and 120 centimeters (1 and 4 feet). Each plant has five or more brown hairy stems that can grow erect or sprawling. The stems have thick and firm yellow-green leaves with smooth margins. It blooms from October into December with flowers that have 10–20 dark lavender ray florets and 12–25 yellow disk florets.

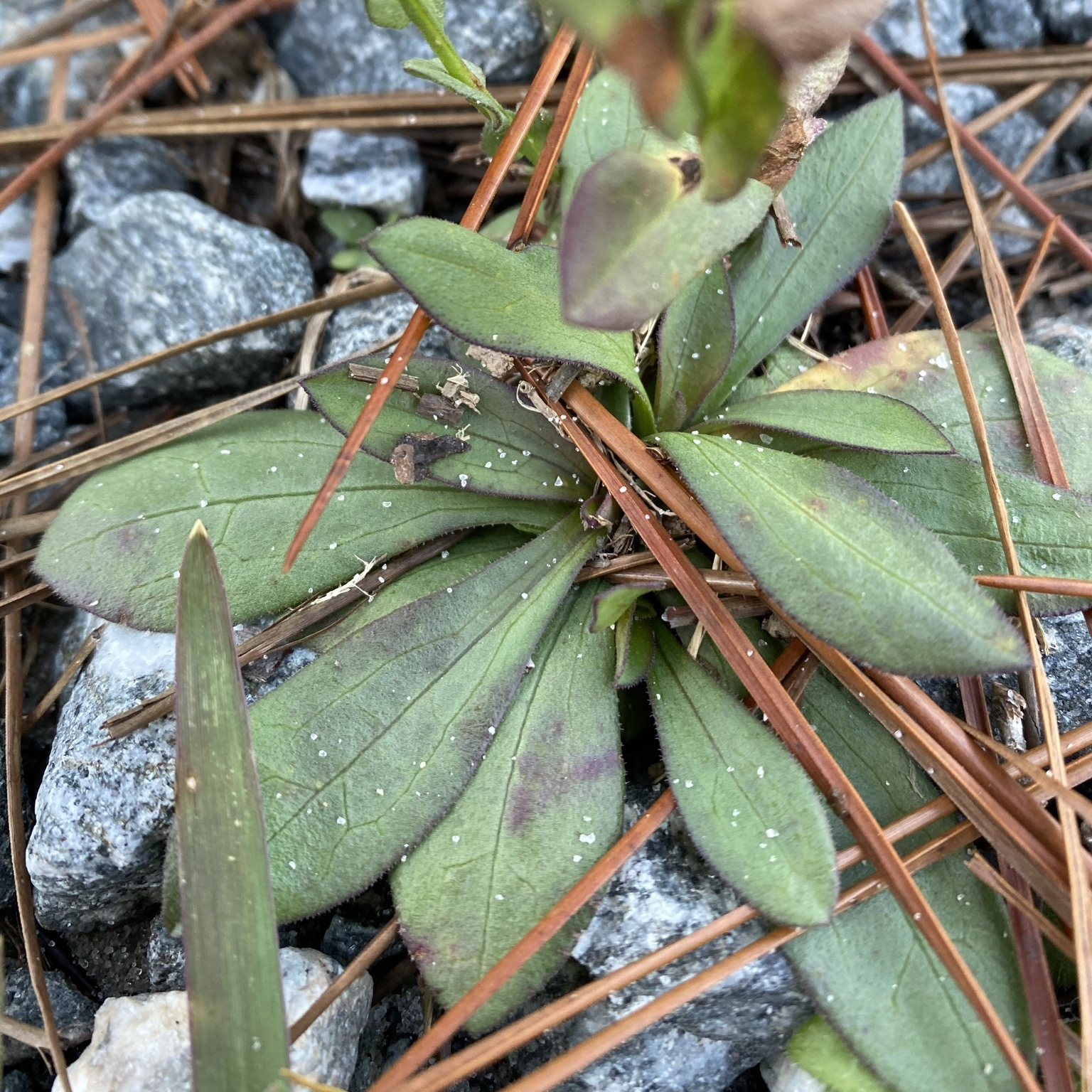
Basal leaves

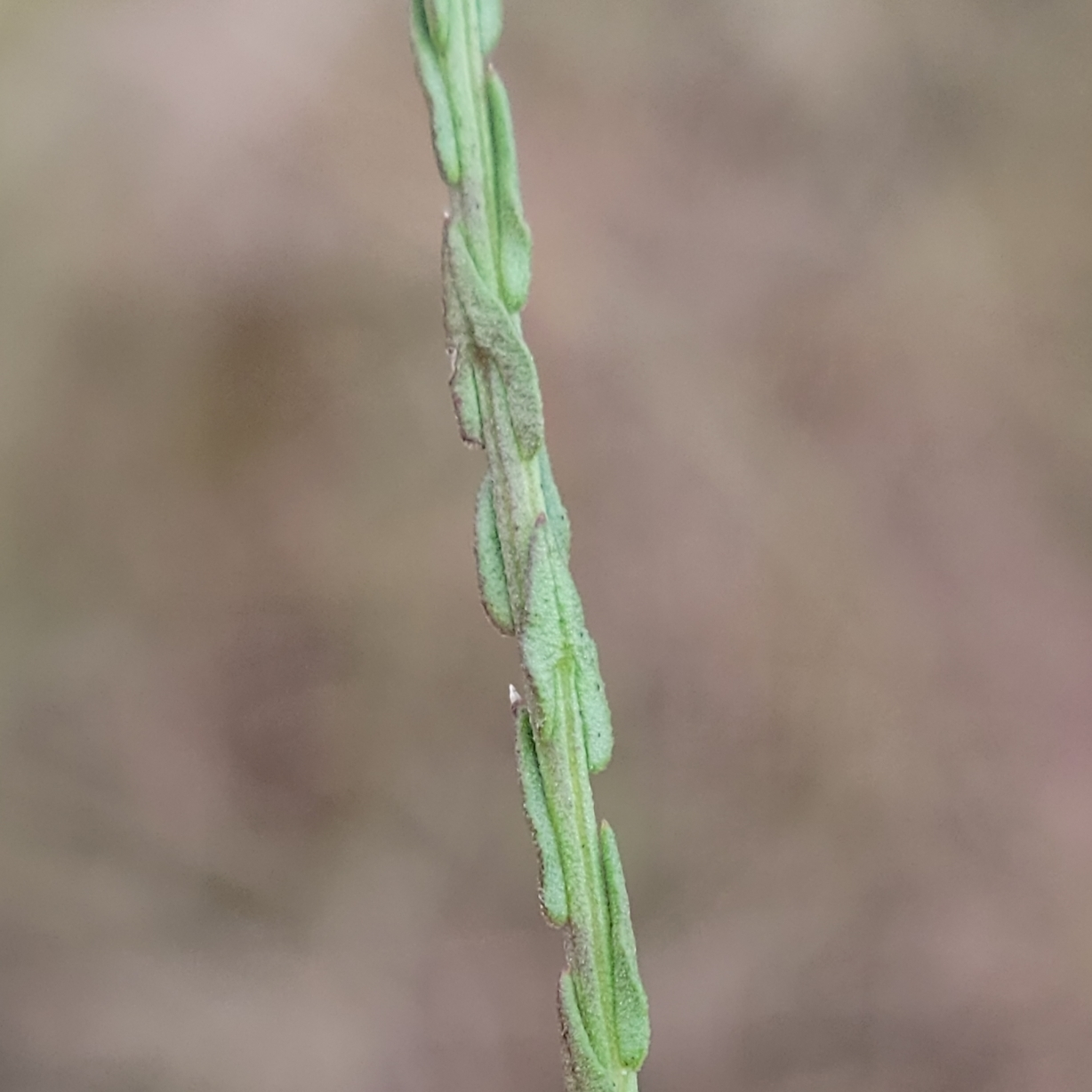
Cauline leaves

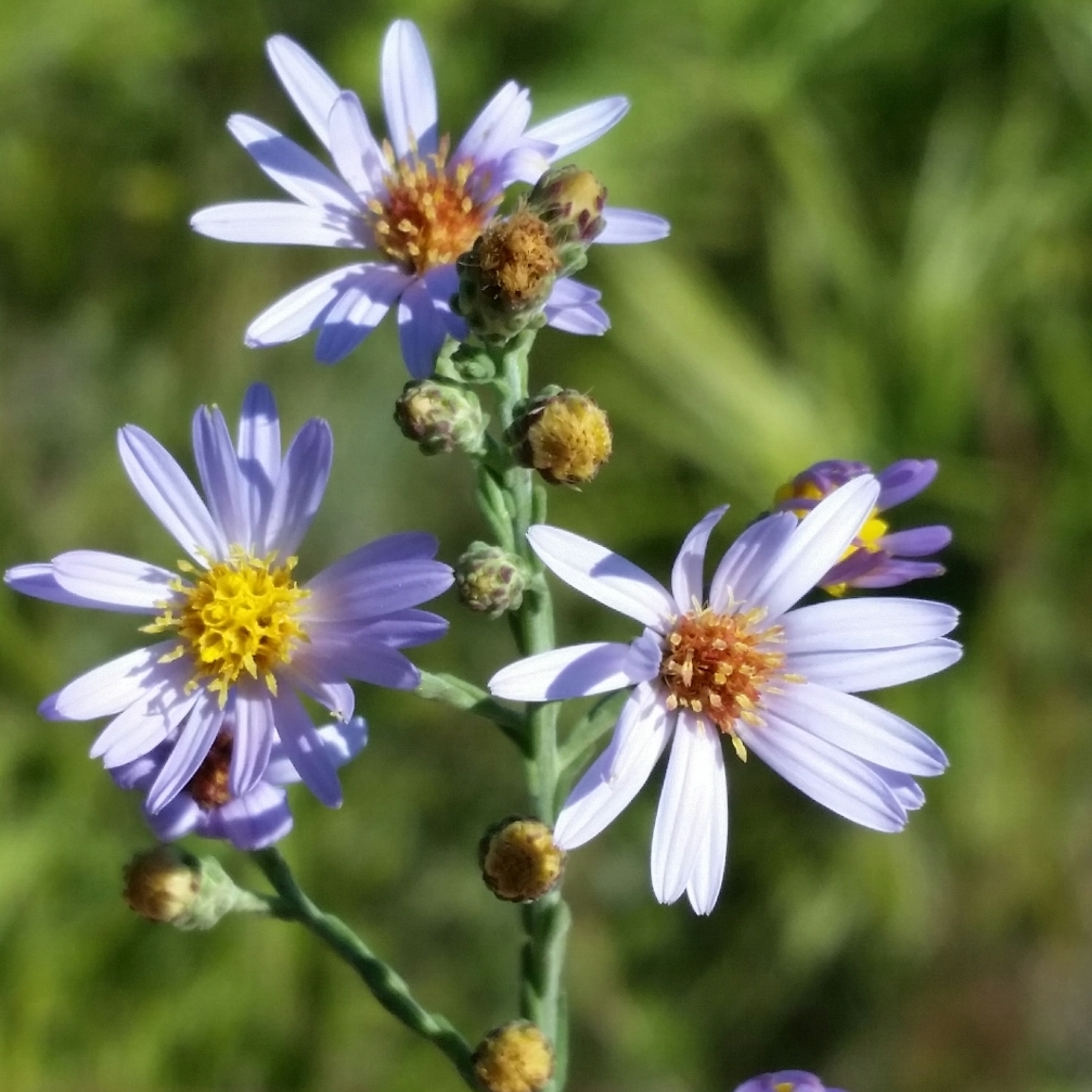
Inflorescence

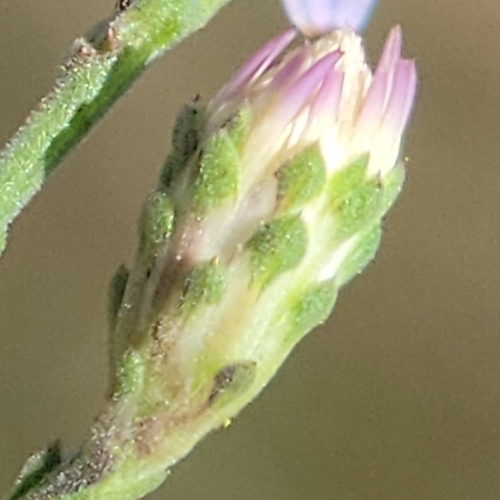
Involucre and phyllaries

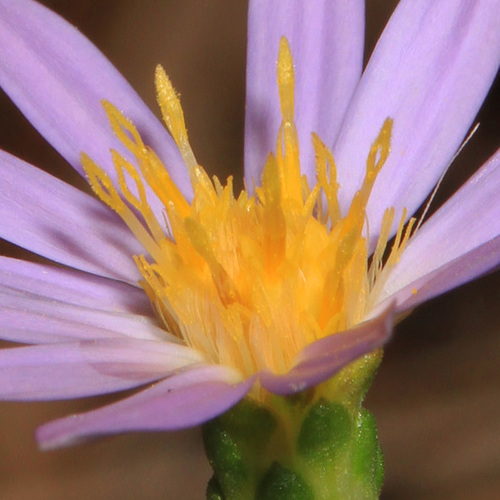
Close-up of ray and disk florets

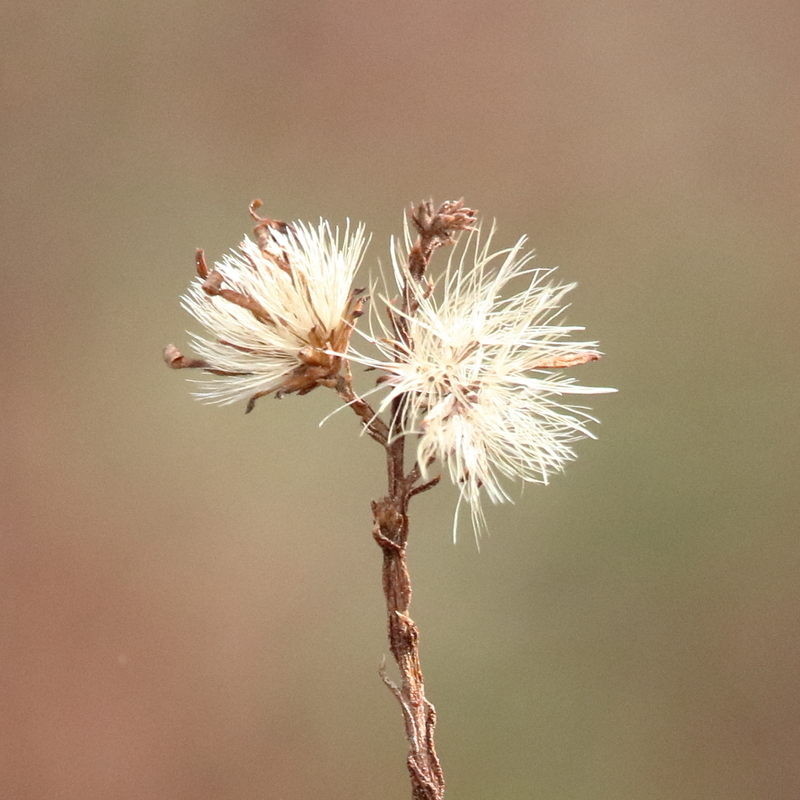
Flower heads after seeding

== Taxonomy ==
The species' basionym (original scientific name) is Aster adnatus Nutt., and it has three other taxonomic synonyms. Its name with author citations is Symphyotrichum adnatus (Nutt.) G.L.Nesom, and a common name scaleleaf aster has been used for it. Within family Asteraceae, tribe Astereae, it is a member of the genus Symphyotrichum and subgenus Virgulus, placed in section Patentes, subsection Brachyphylli, where it exists with its sister species S. walteri.

Placement within Symphyotrichum subg. virgulus
- - Symphyotrichum
    - subg. Chapmaniana
      (1 species)
    - subg. Astropolium
      (11 species)
    - subg. Virgulus
      - sect. Ericoidei
        - S. ericoides
        - S. falcatum
      - sect. Patentes
        - subsect. Brachyphylli
          - S. adnatum
          - S. walteri
        - subsect. Patentes
          - S. georgianum
          - S. patens
          - S. phlogifolium
      - sect. Grandiflori
        - subsect. Mexicanae
          - S. bimater
          - S. chihuahuense
          - S. hintonii
          - S. moranense
          - S. purpurascens
          - S. trilineatum
          - S. turneri
        - subsect. Grandiflori
          - S. campestre
          - S. estesii
          - S. fendleri
          - S. fontinale
          - S. grandiflorum
          - S. oblongifolium
          - S. pygmaeum
          - S. yukonense
      - sect. Polyliguli
        S. novae-angliae
      - sect. Concolores
        - S. concolor
        - S. lucayanum
        - S. plumosum
        - S. pratense
        - S. sericeum
    - subg. Ascendentes
      (2 species)
    - subg. Symphyotrichum
      (55 species)

== Distribution and habitat ==
S. adnatum is native to the Bahamas and the southeastern United States, including Alabama, Florida, Georgia, Louisiana, and Mississippi. It grows at elevations up to 100 meters (330 feet) in scrubland and woodland with sandy soils.

== Conservation ==
As of October 2024, NatureServe listed Symphyotrichum adnatum as Apparently Secure (G4) worldwide. The status was last reviewed 2 May 1988.
