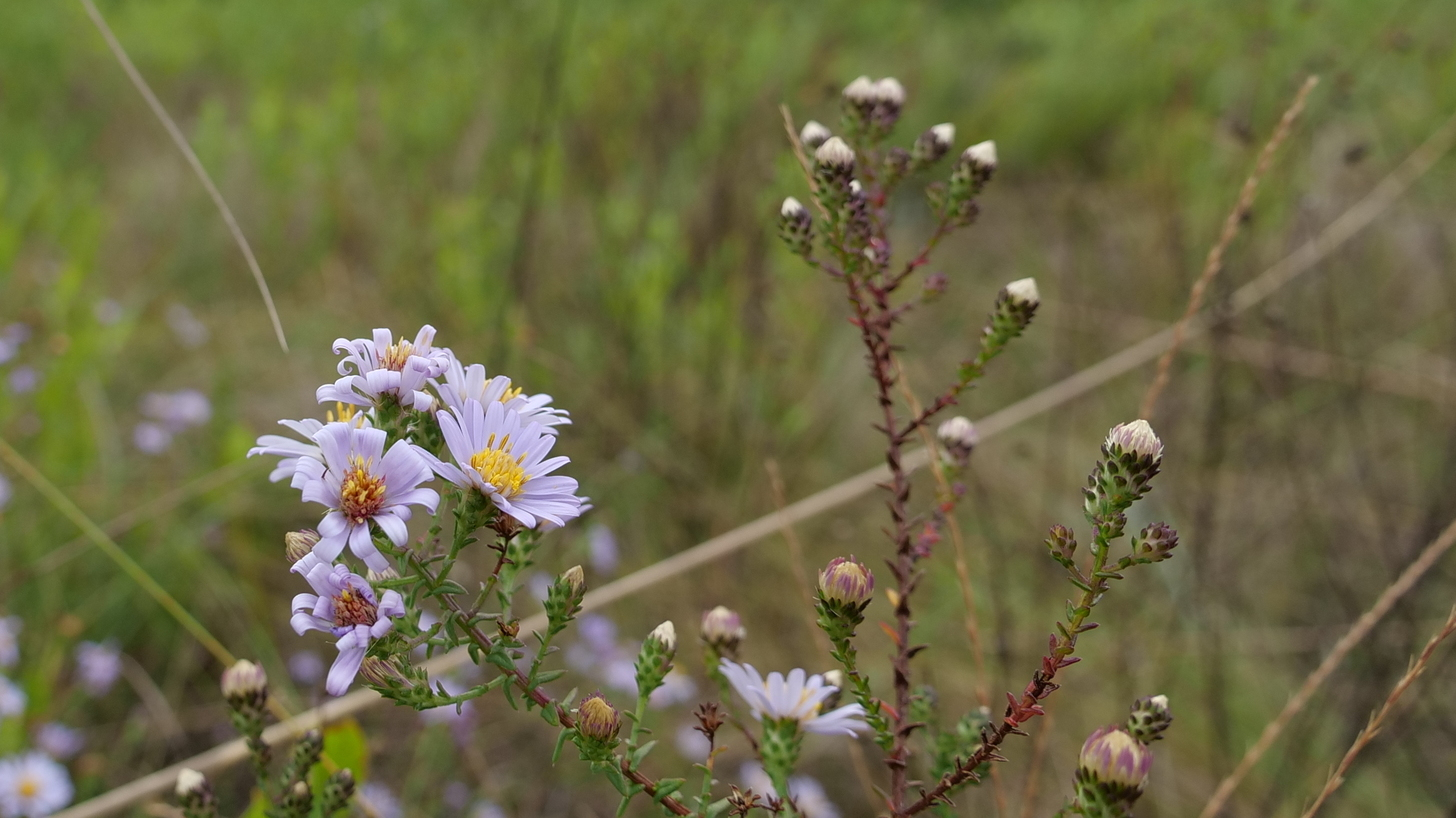

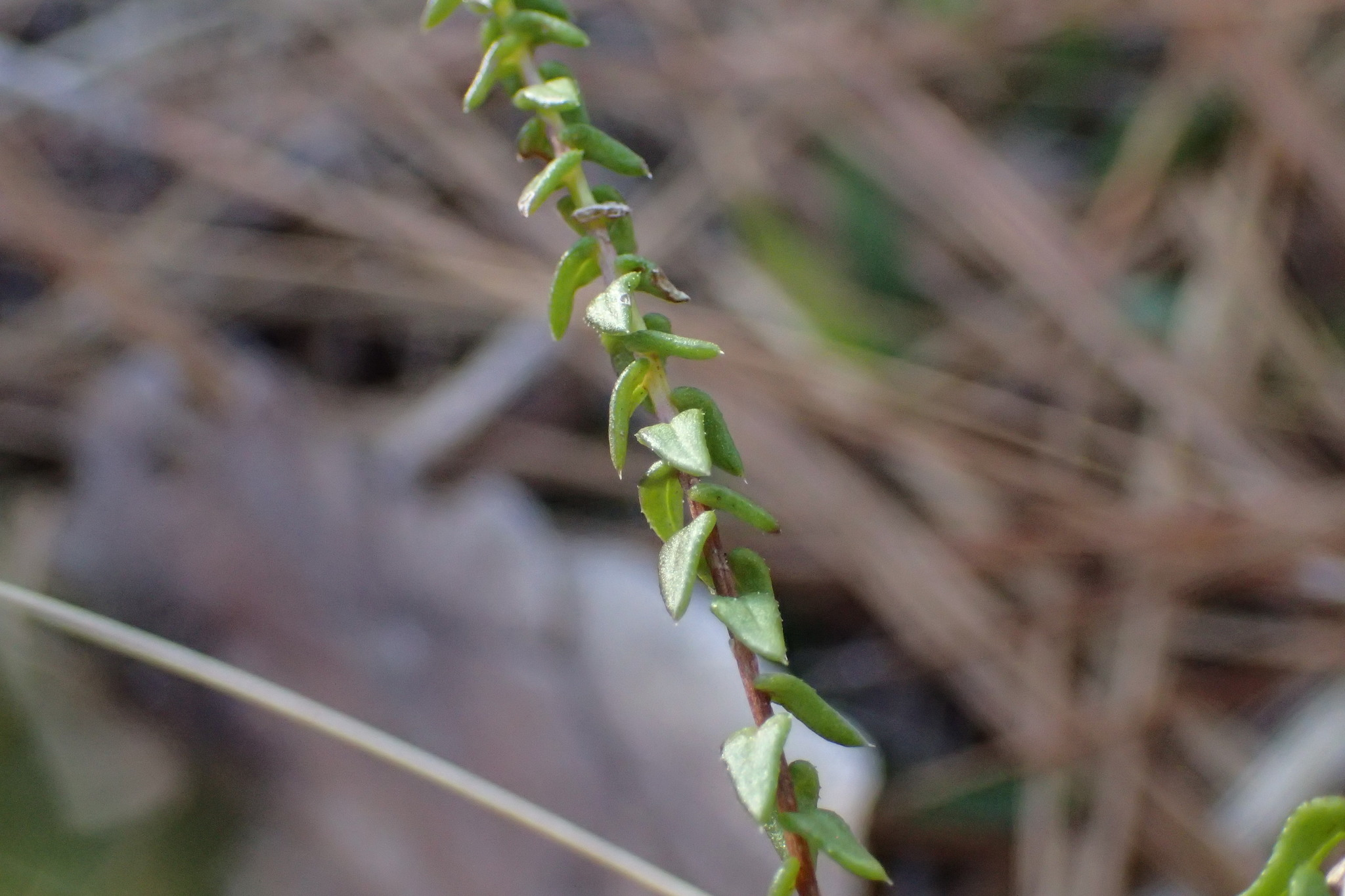

Conservation status
- Apparently Secure (NatureServe)

Scientific classification
- Kingdom: Plantae
- Clade: Tracheophytes
- Clade: Angiosperms
- Clade: Eudicots
- Clade: Asterids
- Order: Asterales
- Family: Asteraceae
- Tribe: Astereae
- Subtribe: Symphyotrichinae
- Genus: Symphyotrichum
- Subgenus: Symphyotrichum subg. Virgulus
- Section: Symphyotrichum sect. Patentes
- Species: S. walteri

Binomial name
- Symphyotrichum walteri (Alexander) G.L.Nesom
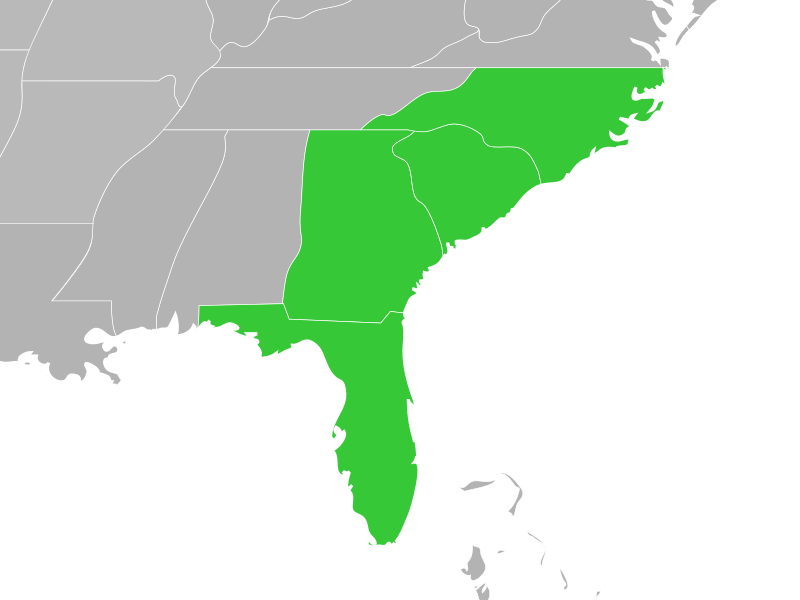
- Native distribution

Synonyms
- Aster walteri Alexander; Lasallea walteri (Alexander) Semple & Brouillet; Virgulus walteri (Small) Reveal & Keener

= Symphyotrichum walteri =

Species of plant in the aster family

Symphyotrichum walteri (formerly Aster walteri) is a species of flowering plant in the family Asteraceae native to the southeastern United States. Commonly known as Walter's aster, it is a perennial, herbaceous plant that may reach 20 to 100 centimeters (3/4 to 3 1/4 feet) tall. Its flowers have bluish-purple ray florets and yellow disk florets.
