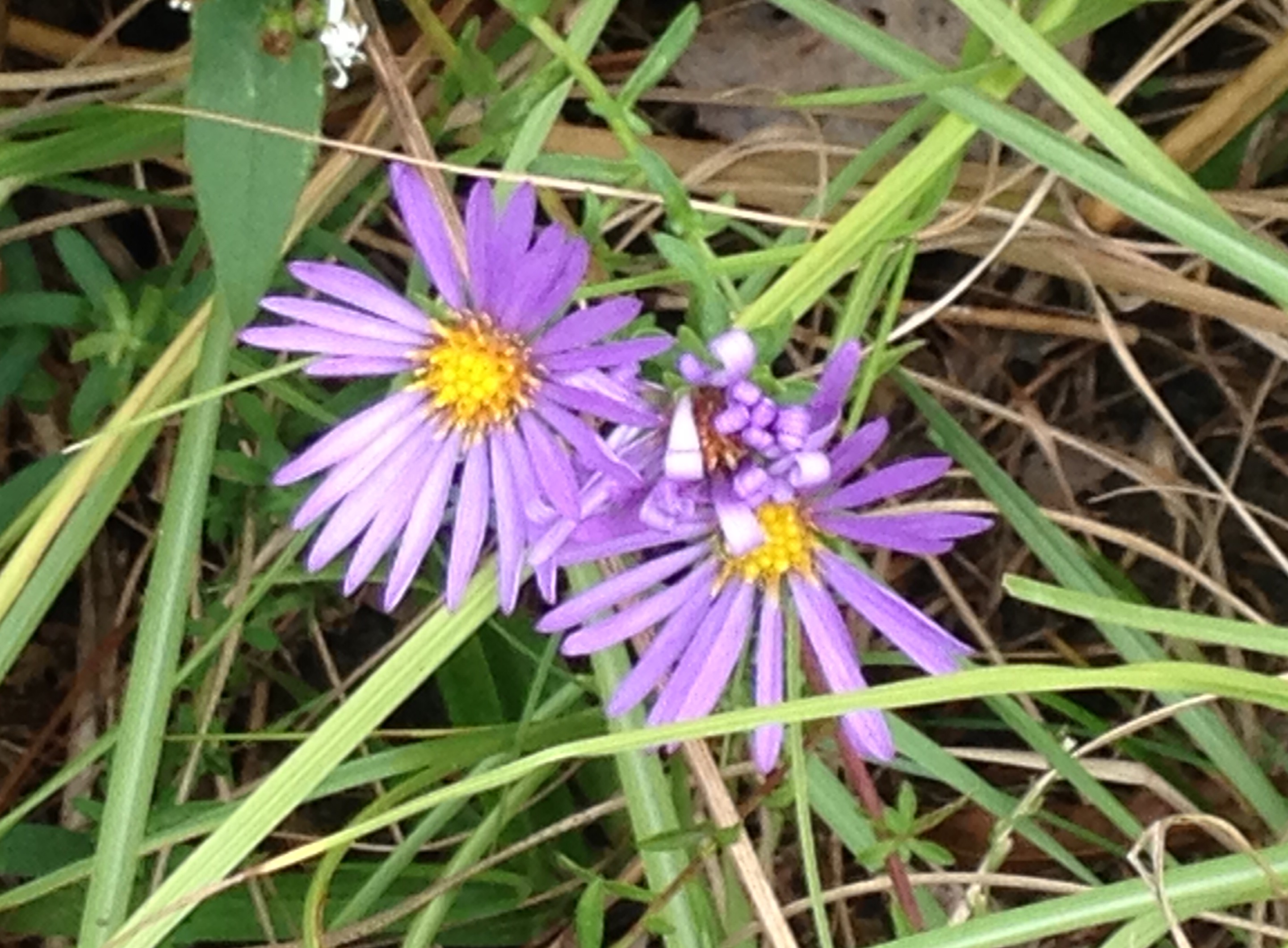

Conservation status
- Apparently Secure (NatureServe)

Scientific classification
- Kingdom: Plantae
- Clade: Tracheophytes
- Clade: Angiosperms
- Clade: Eudicots
- Clade: Asterids
- Order: Asterales
- Family: Asteraceae
- Tribe: Astereae
- Subtribe: Symphyotrichinae
- Genus: Symphyotrichum
- Subgenus: Symphyotrichum subg. Virgulus
- Section: Symphyotrichum sect. Grandiflori
- Species: S. grandiflorum

Binomial name
- Symphyotrichum grandiflorum (L.) G.L.Nesom
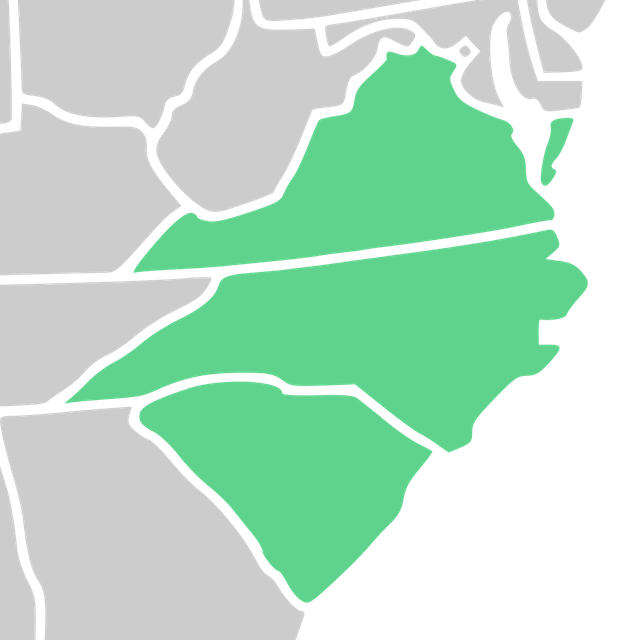
- Native distribution

Synonyms
- Aster asperrimus Nutt.; Aster grandiflorus L.; Lasallea grandiflora (L.) Semple & Brouillet; Virgulus grandiflorus (L.) Reveal & Keener

= Symphyotrichum grandiflorum =

Species of plant in the aster family

Symphyotrichum grandiflorum (formerly Aster grandiflorus), the largeflower aster, is a species of flowering plant in the family Asteraceae. It is endemic to the southeastern United States where it is restricted to the Atlantic coastal plain of Virginia, North Carolina, and South Carolina, and the Piedmont of North Carolina and South Carolina. It is known from habitats such as sandy areas, roadsides, thickets, and forest edges. It can be distinguished from other Symphyotrichum species by its taller and hairier stems, clasping lower leaves, and large, showy flower heads. It is possibly threatened by habitat destruction within its restricted range but is still considered locally abundant in many areas such as the southern Appalachian Mountains.

== Gallery ==
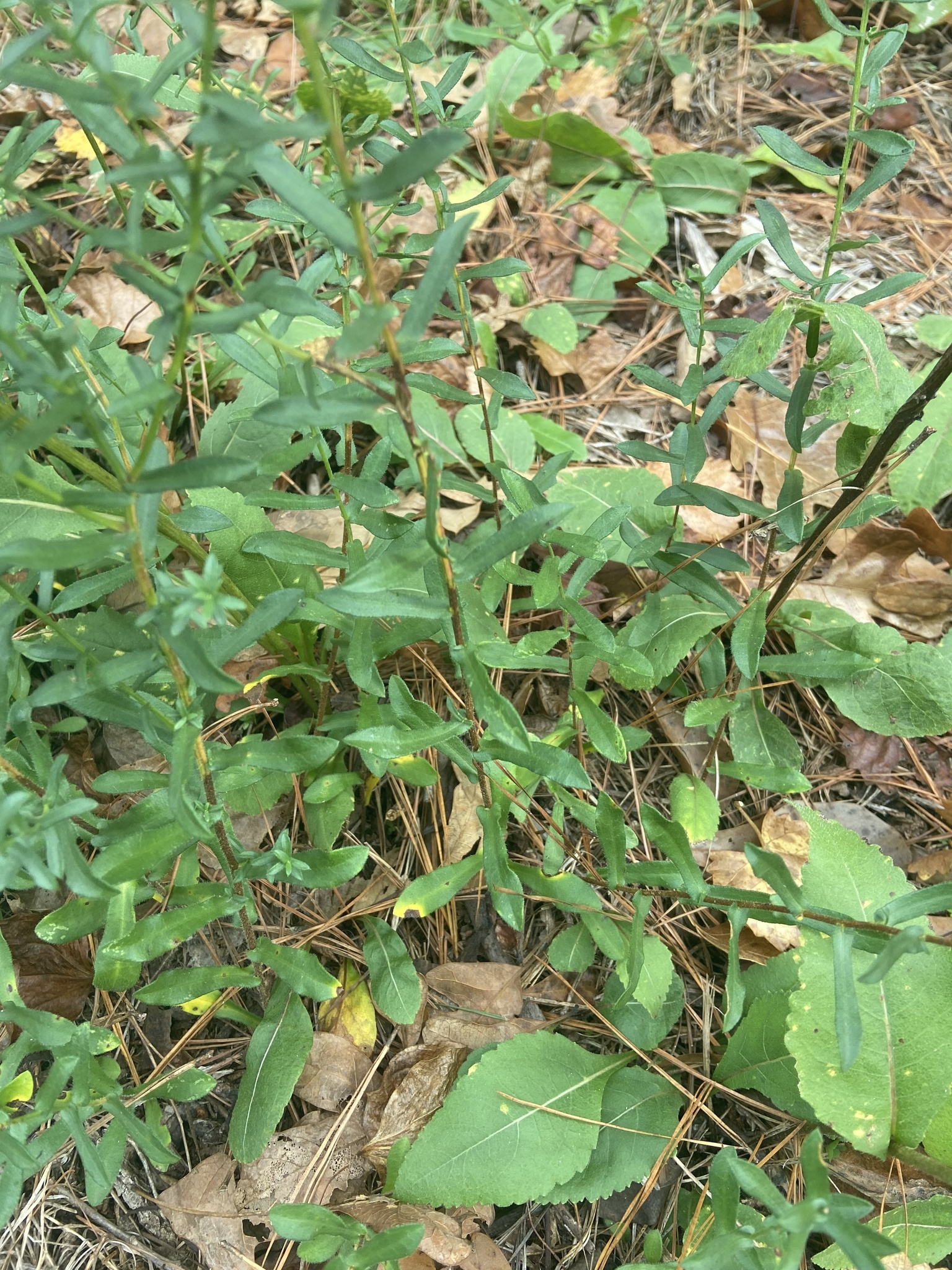

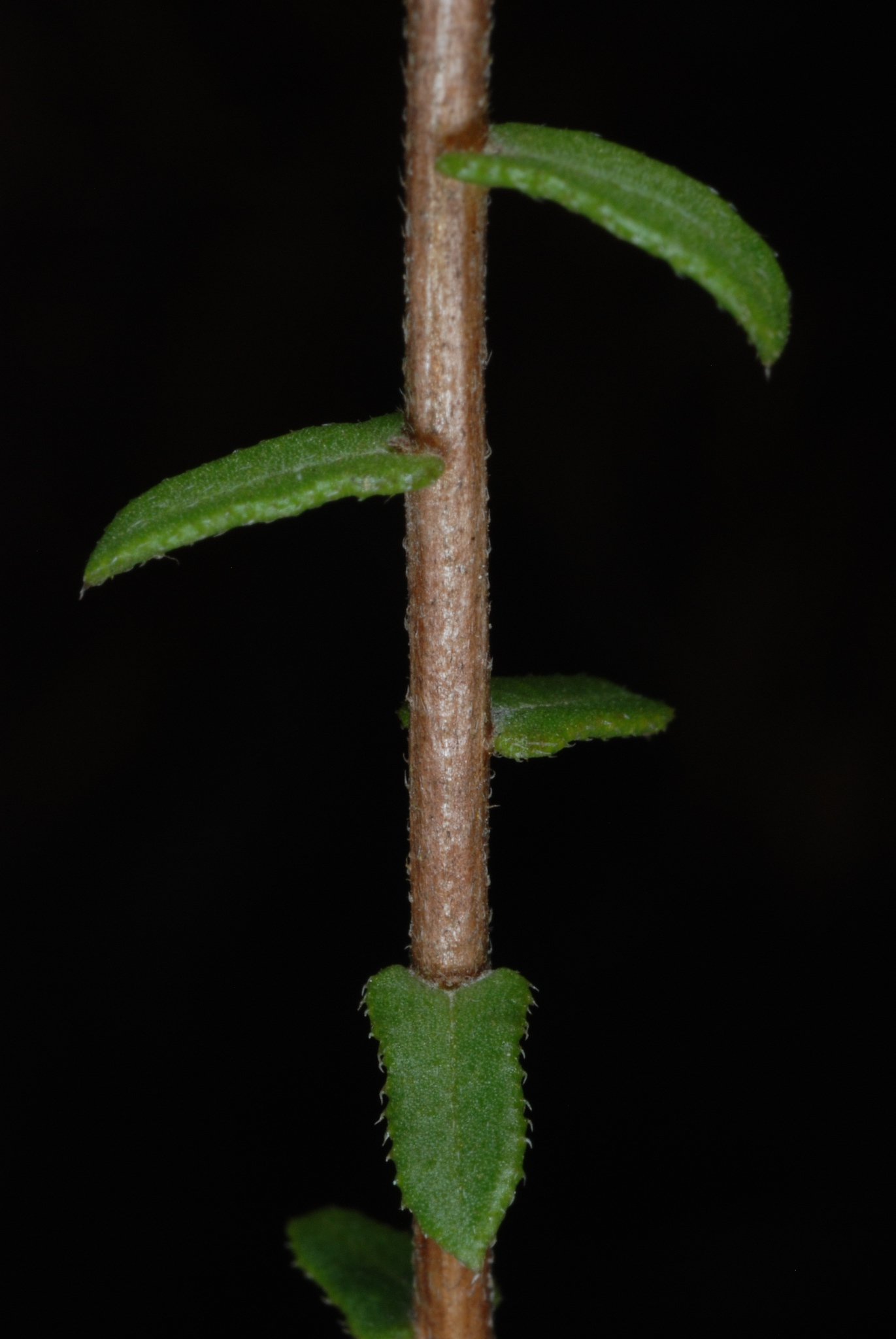

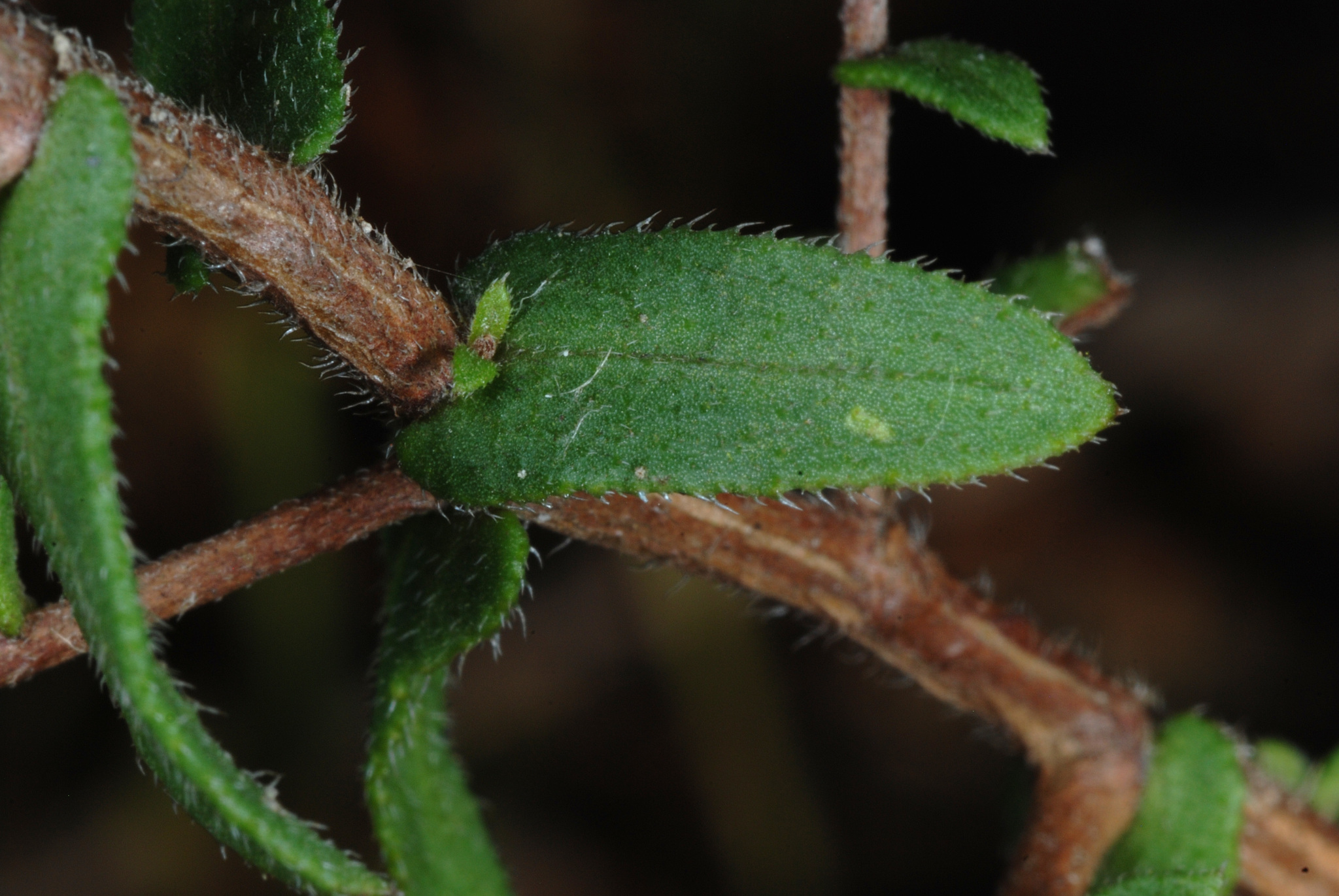

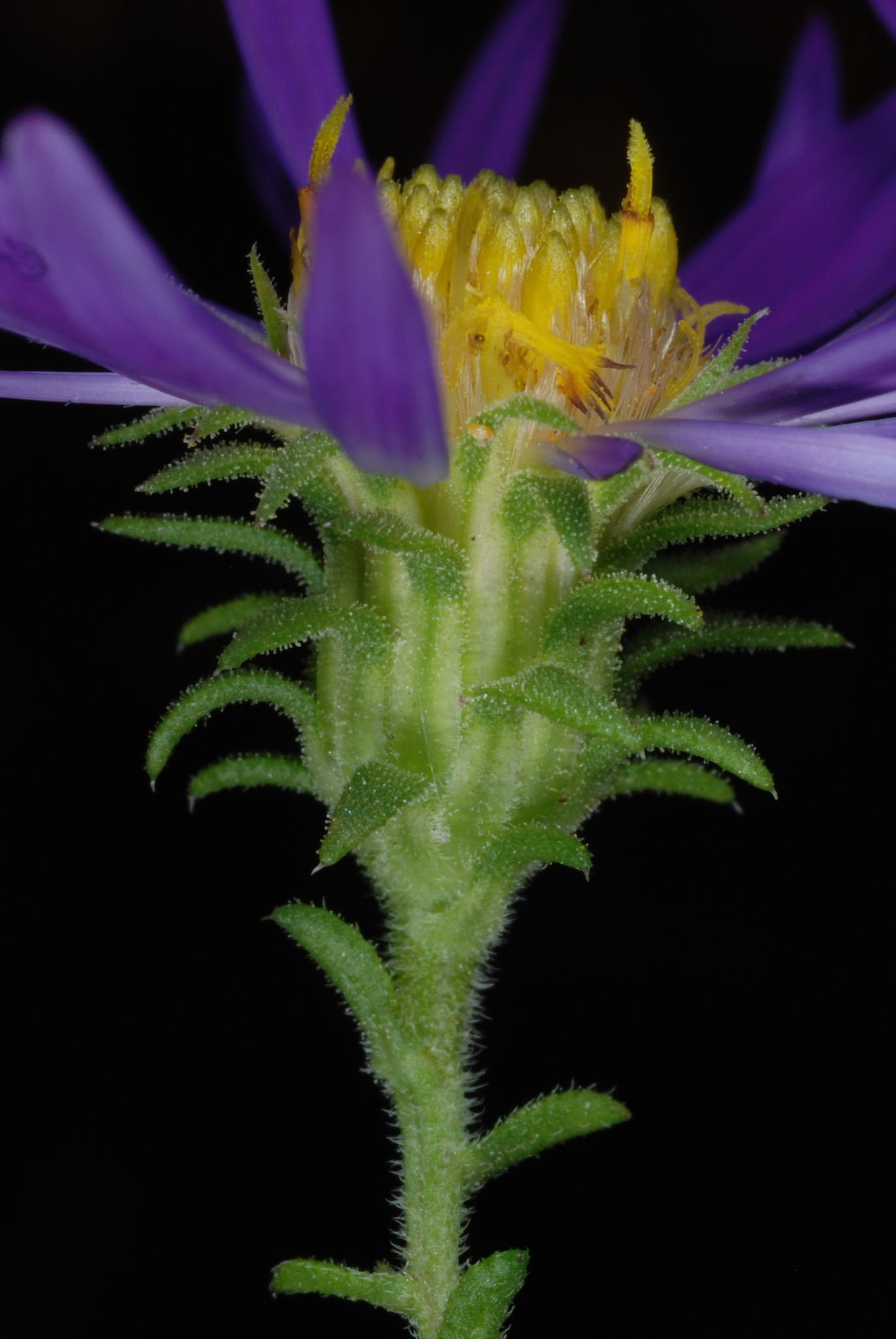

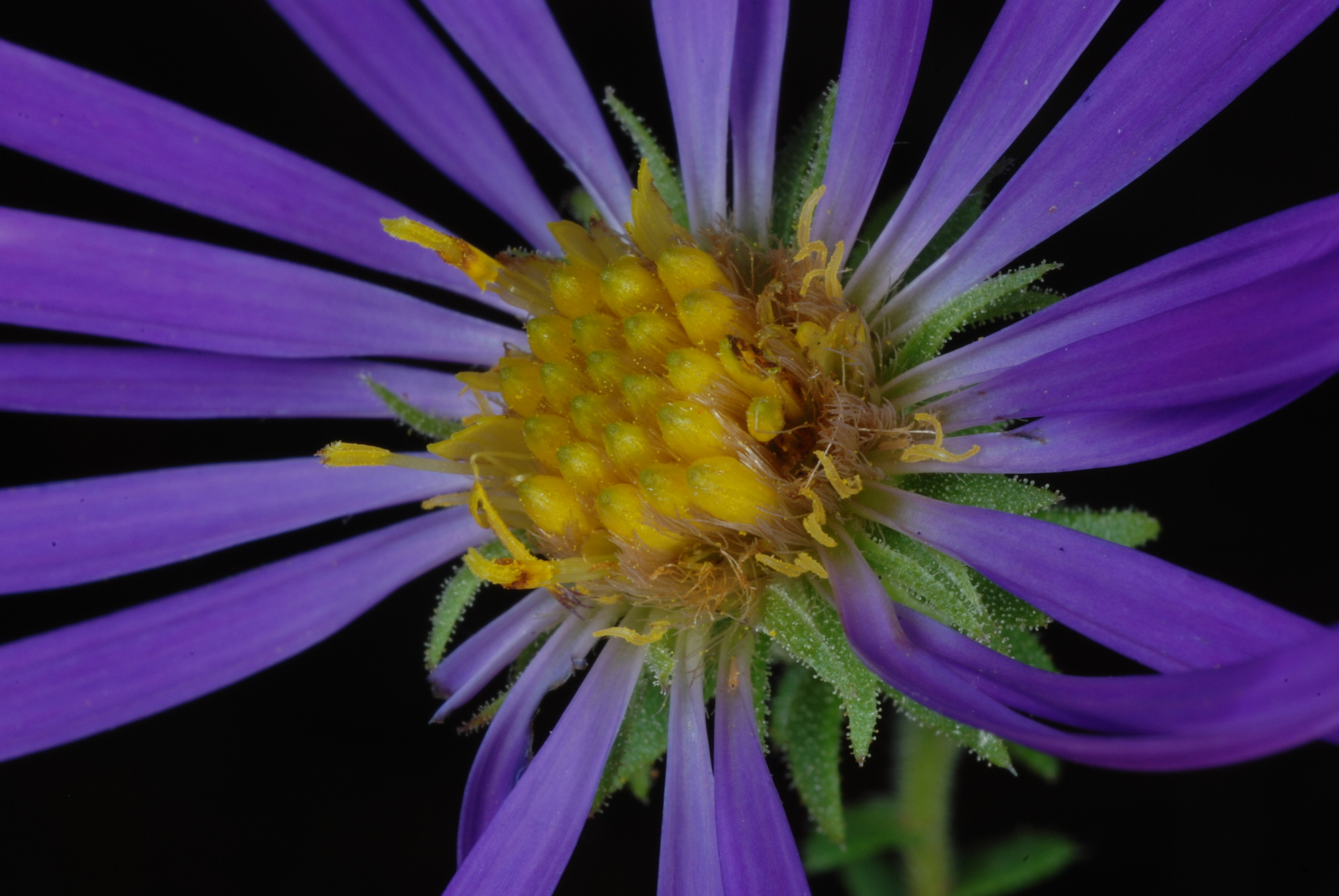
