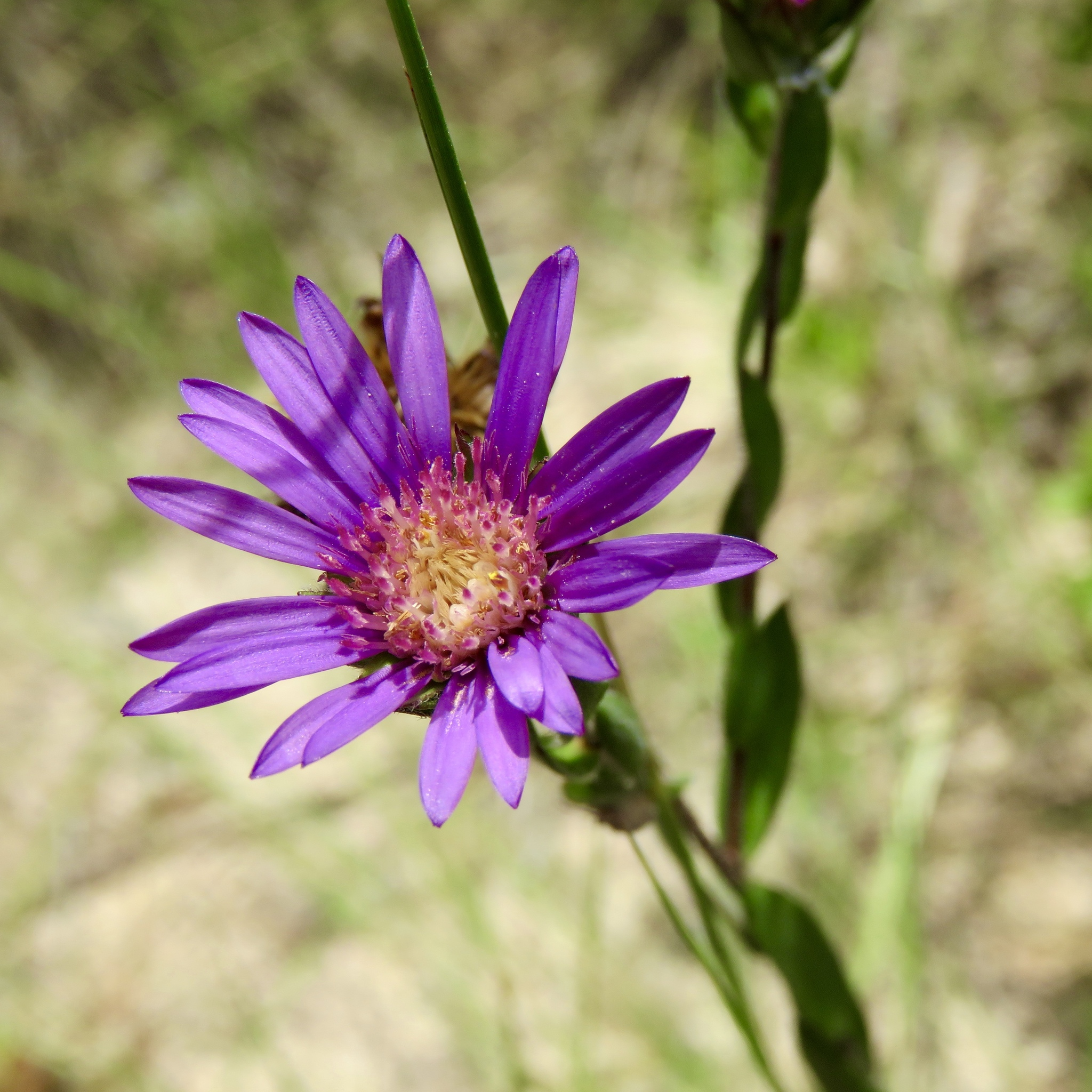

Conservation status
- Apparently Secure (NatureServe)

Scientific classification
- Kingdom: Plantae
- Clade: Tracheophytes
- Clade: Angiosperms
- Clade: Eudicots
- Clade: Asterids
- Order: Asterales
- Family: Asteraceae
- Tribe: Astereae
- Subtribe: Symphyotrichinae
- Genus: Symphyotrichum
- Subgenus: Symphyotrichum subg. Virgulus
- Species: S. pratense

Binomial name
- Symphyotrichum pratense (Raf.) G.L.Nesom
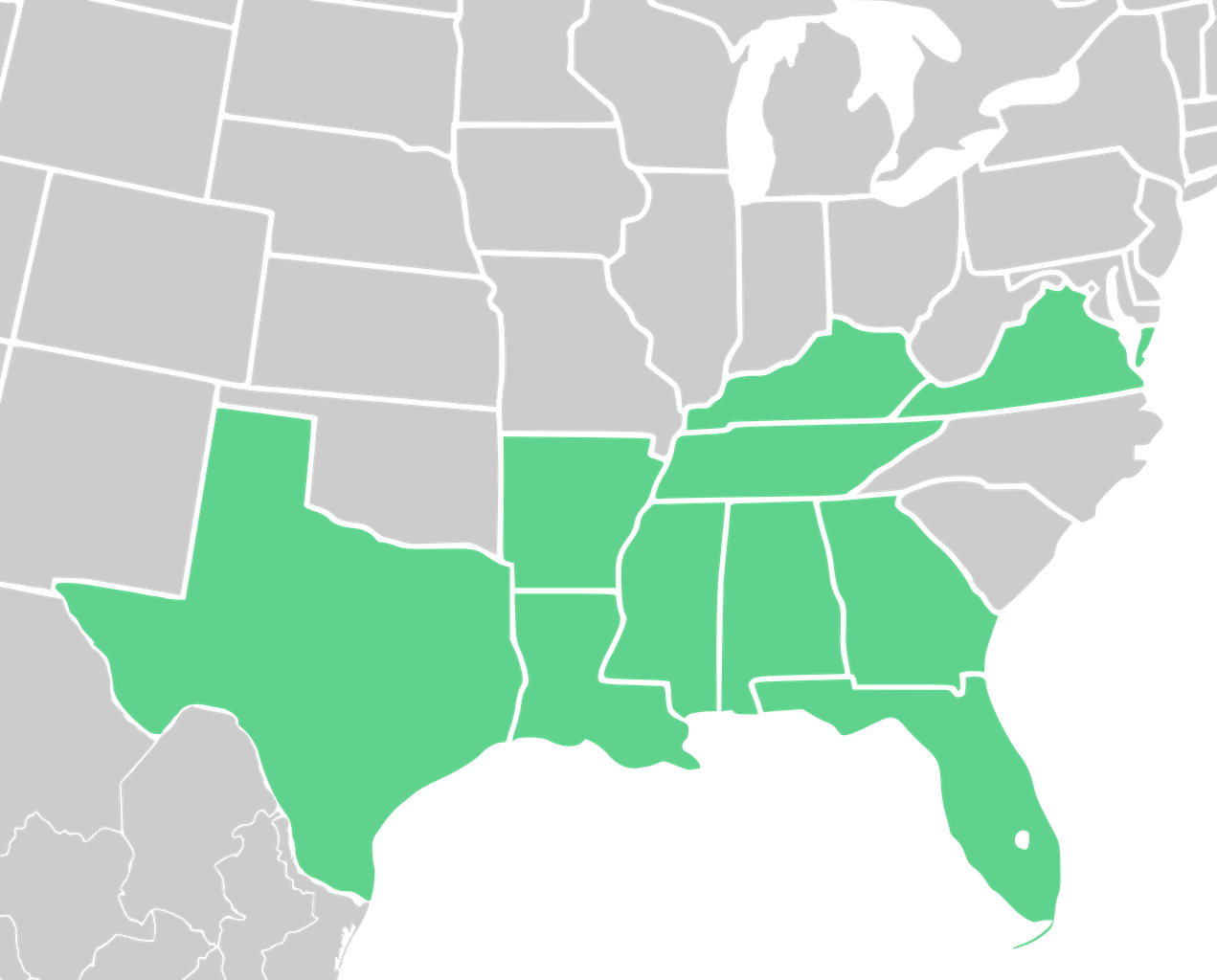
- Native distribution

Synonyms
- Basionym: Aster pratensis Raf.; Alphabetical list: Aster ciliatus Nutt.; Aster phyllolepis Torr. & A.Gray; Aster sericeus var. microphyllus DC.; Lasallea phyllolepis Greene; Lasallea sericea subsp. pratensis (Raf.) Semple & Brouillet; Symphyotrichum sericeum var. microphyllum (DC.) Wunderlin & B.F.Hansen; Virgulus pratensis (Raf.) Reveal & Keener

= Symphyotrichum pratense =

Species of plant in the aster family

Symphyotrichum pratense (formerly Aster pratensis) is a species of flowering plant in the family Asteraceae native to the southeastern United States. Commonly known as barrens silky aster, it is a perennial, herbaceous plant that may reach 40 to 60 centimeters (16 to 24 inches) tall. Its flowers have rose-purple ray florets and pink then purple disk florets.

== Gallery ==
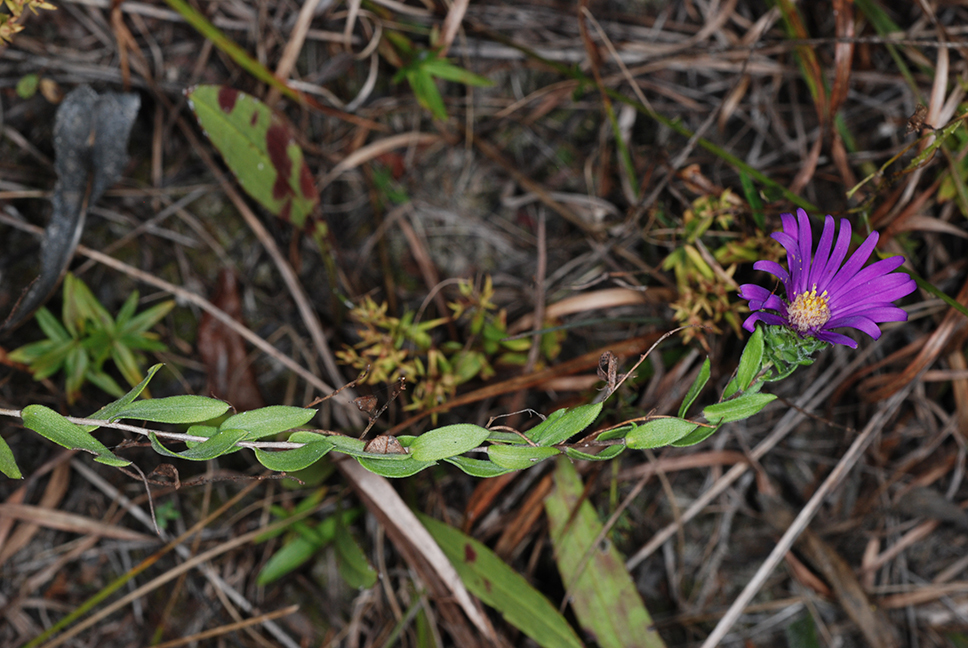
Stem, leaves, flower head

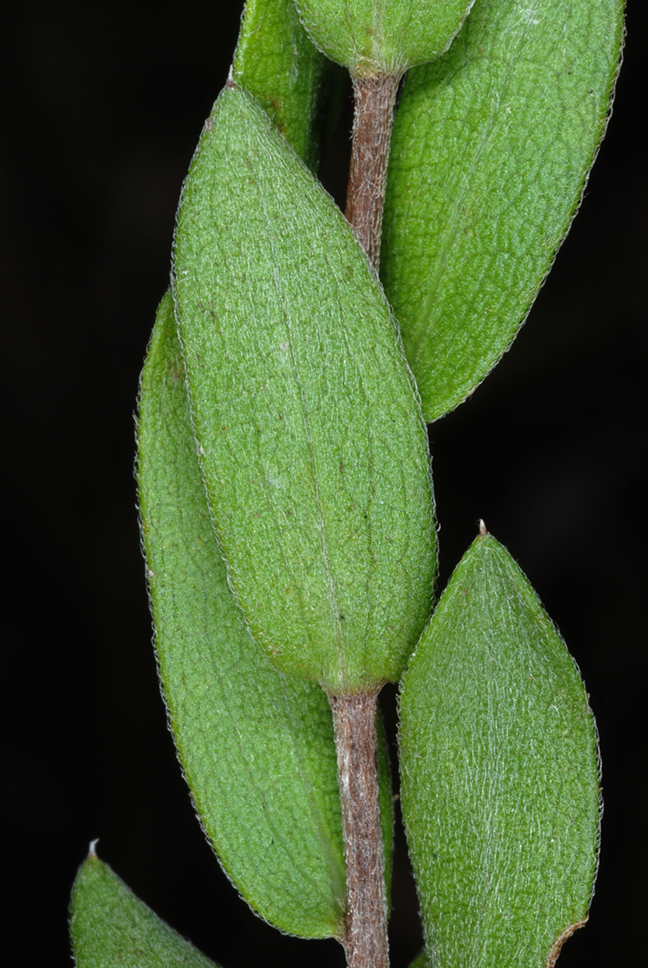
Stem and leaves

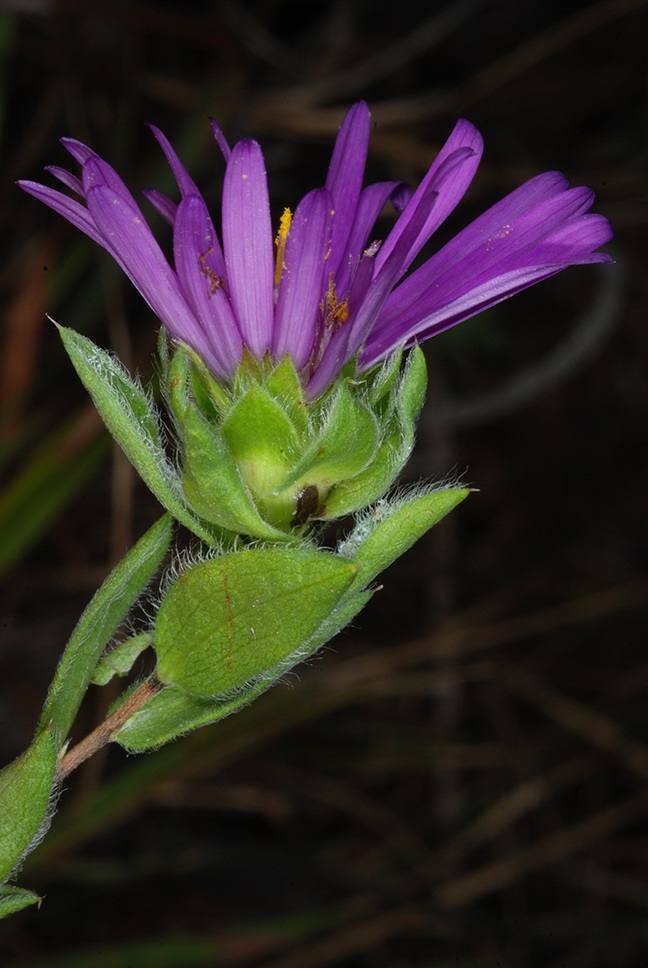
Bracts, involucre, and phyllaries

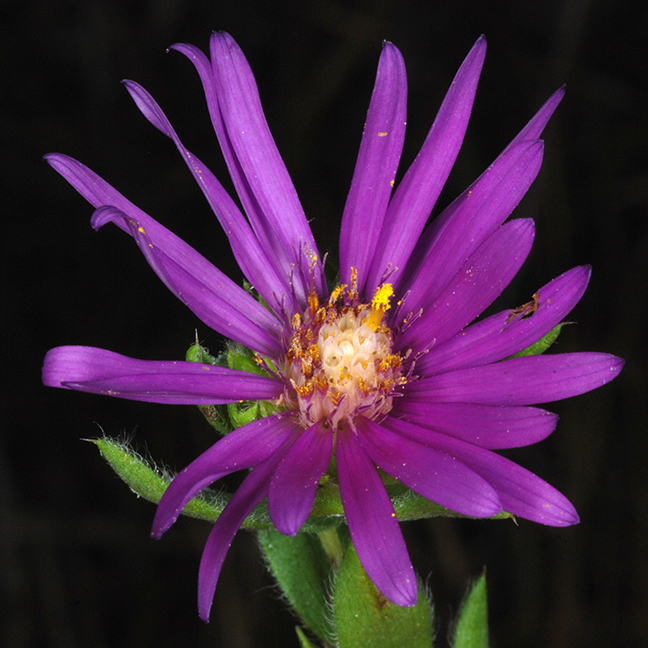
Flower head top view

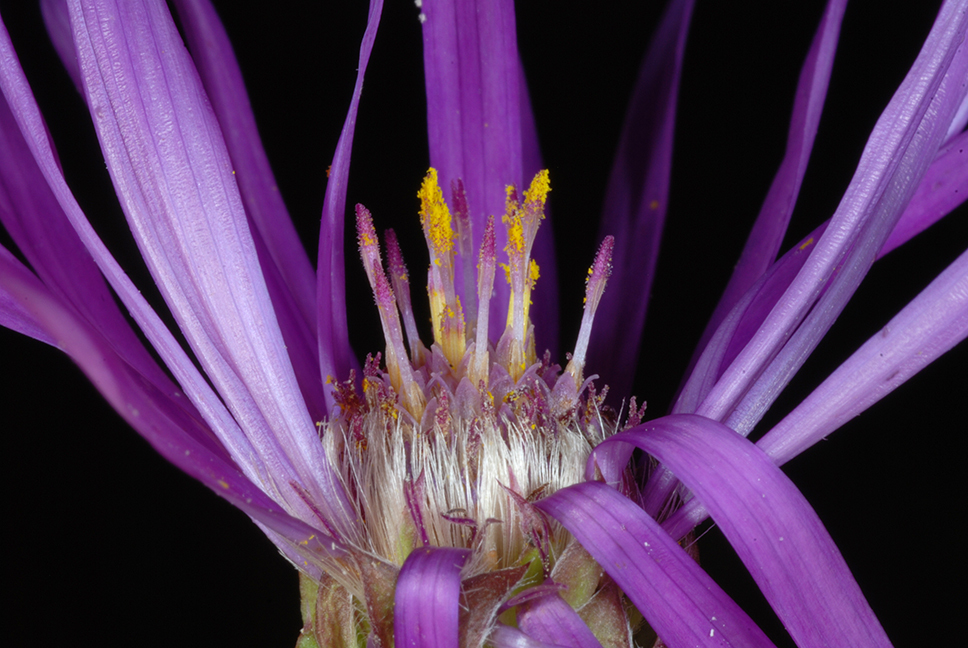
Flower head side view with rays pulled back

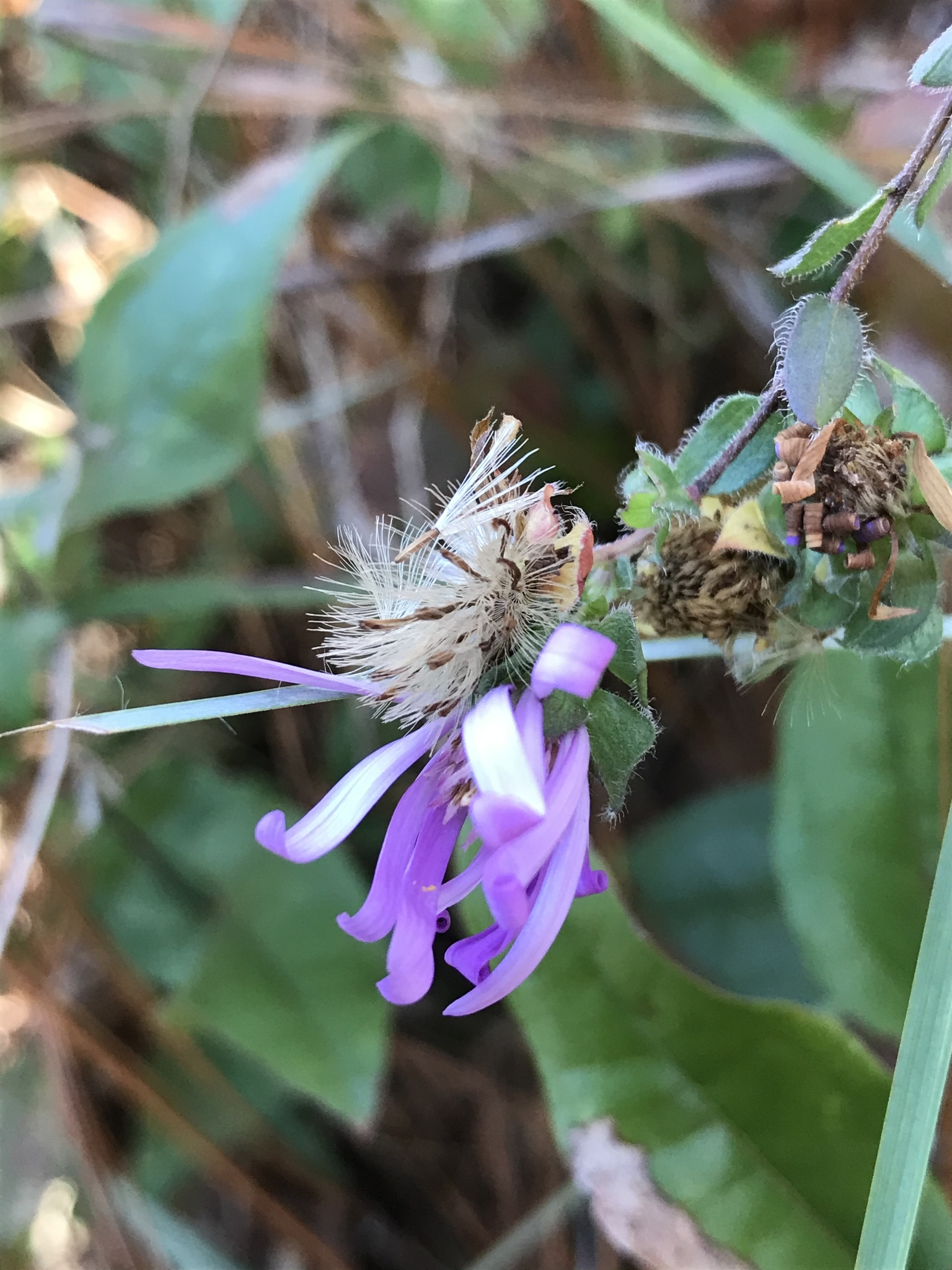
Fruits
