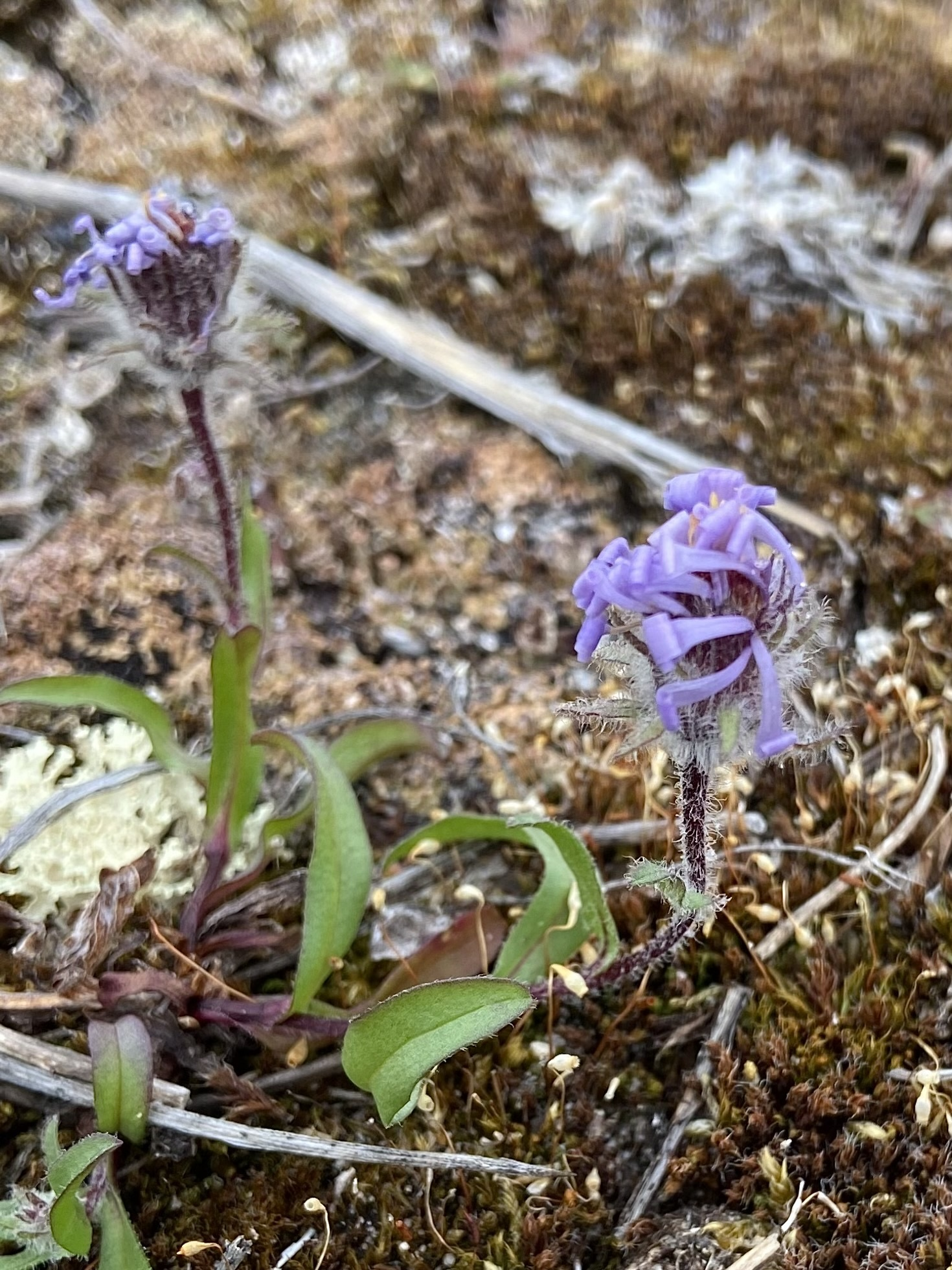
- Victoria Island, Kitikmeot Region, Nunavut, Canada

Conservation status
- Apparently Secure (NatureServe)

Scientific classification
- Kingdom: Plantae
- Clade: Tracheophytes
- Clade: Angiosperms
- Clade: Eudicots
- Clade: Asterids
- Order: Asterales
- Family: Asteraceae
- Tribe: Astereae
- Subtribe: Symphyotrichinae
- Genus: Symphyotrichum
- Subgenus: Symphyotrichum subg. Virgulus
- Section: Symphyotrichum sect. Grandiflori
- Species: S. pygmaeum

Binomial name
- Symphyotrichum pygmaeum (Lindl.) Brouillet & Selliah
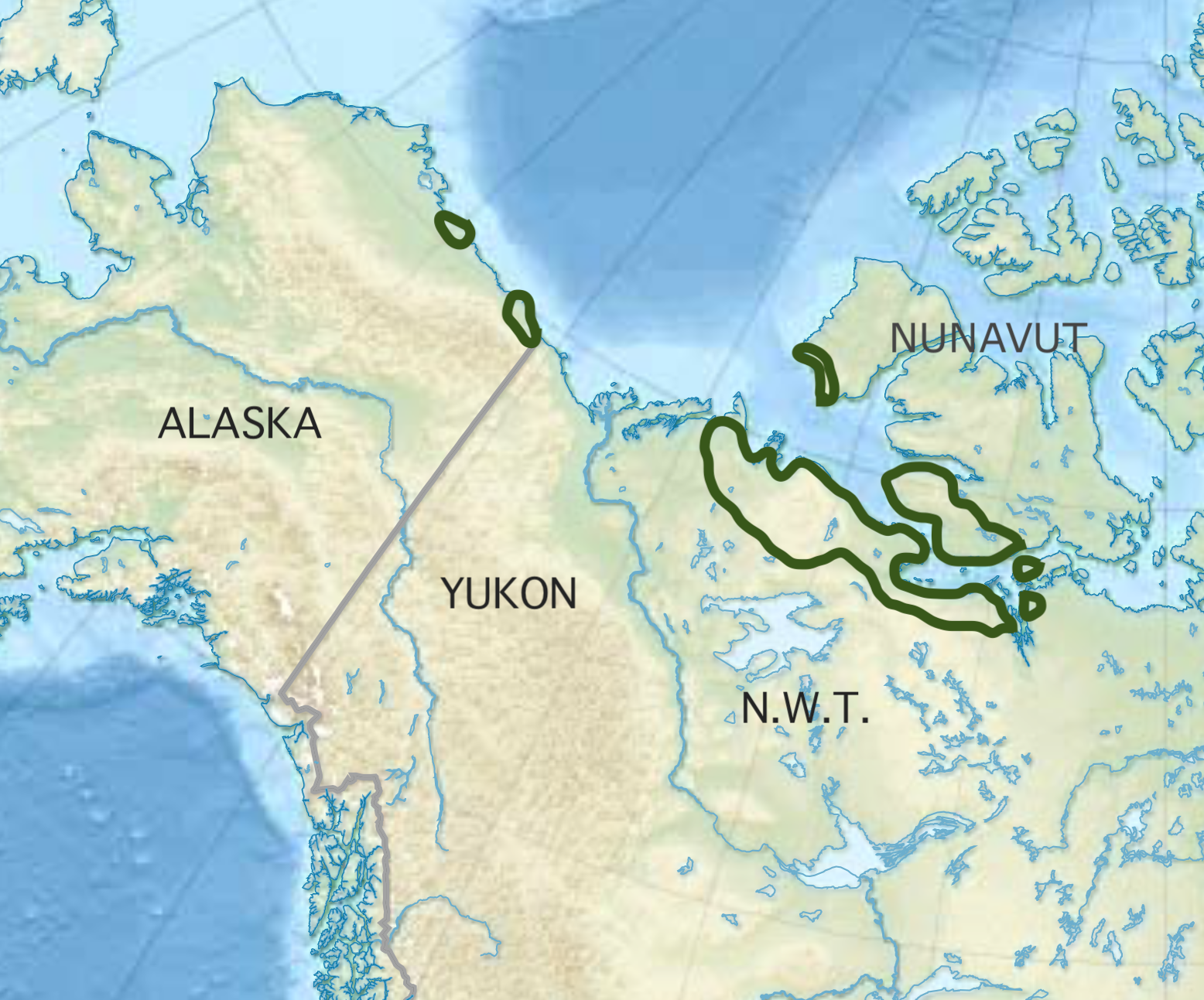
- Native distribution

Synonyms
- Basionym: Aster pygmaeus Lindl.; Other synonyms: Aster sibiricus subsp. pygmaeus (Lindl.) Á.Löve & D.Löve; Aster sibiricus var. pygmaeus (Lindl.) Cody; Eurybia pygmaea (Lindl.) G.L.Nesom

= Symphyotrichum pygmaeum =

Species of flowering plant

Symphyotrichum pygmaeum (formerly Eurybia pygmaea and Aster pygmaeus) is a species of flowering plant in the family Asteraceae. Commonly known as pygmy aster, it is a perennial, herbaceous plant that may reach heights of 1.5 to 15 centimeters (1/2 to 6 inches). Its summer-blooming flowers have purple to violet ray florets and yellow disk florets.

== Distribution and habitat ==
S. pygmaeum is native to north Alaska, Northwest Territories, and Nunavut, and it grows at up to 200 meters (660 feet) or more above sea level in moist sand dunes, sandy or silty stream banks, gravelly tundra, and similar habitats.

== Conservation ==
As of December 2022, it was classified by NatureServe (as Eurybia pygmaea) as Apparently Secure (G4) globally; Apparently Secure (S4) in Northwest Territories and Nunavut; and, Imperiled (S2) in Alaska. Its global status was last reviewed by NatureServe on 23 June 2016. Several known locations of the plant, especially in Alaska, are near oil field developments, increasing the potential threat to its survival in those areas. "The sand and gravel sites favored by this species are [...] prized for material sites by mineral and oil exploration and development companies."

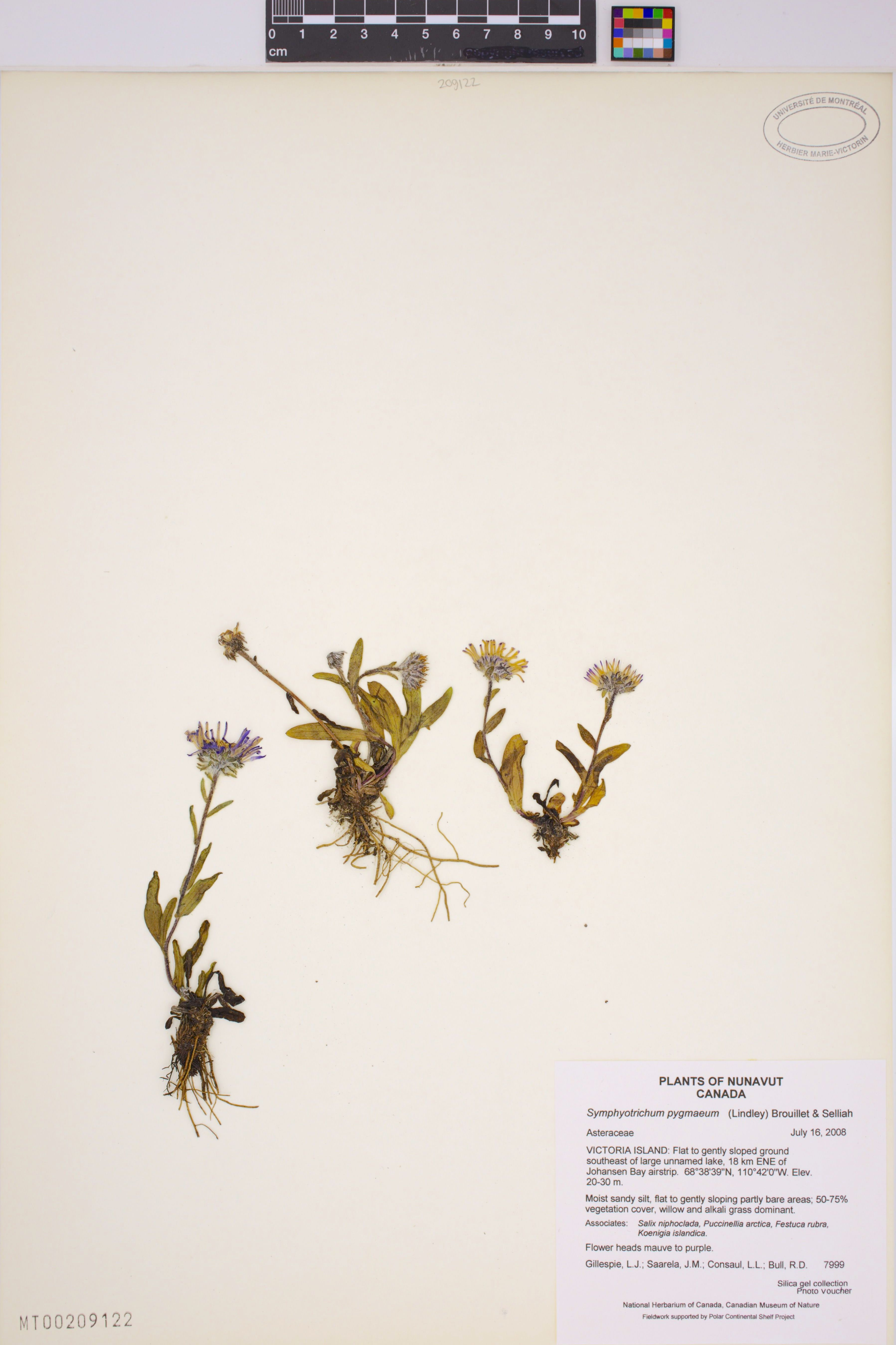
S. pygmaeum herbarium specimen

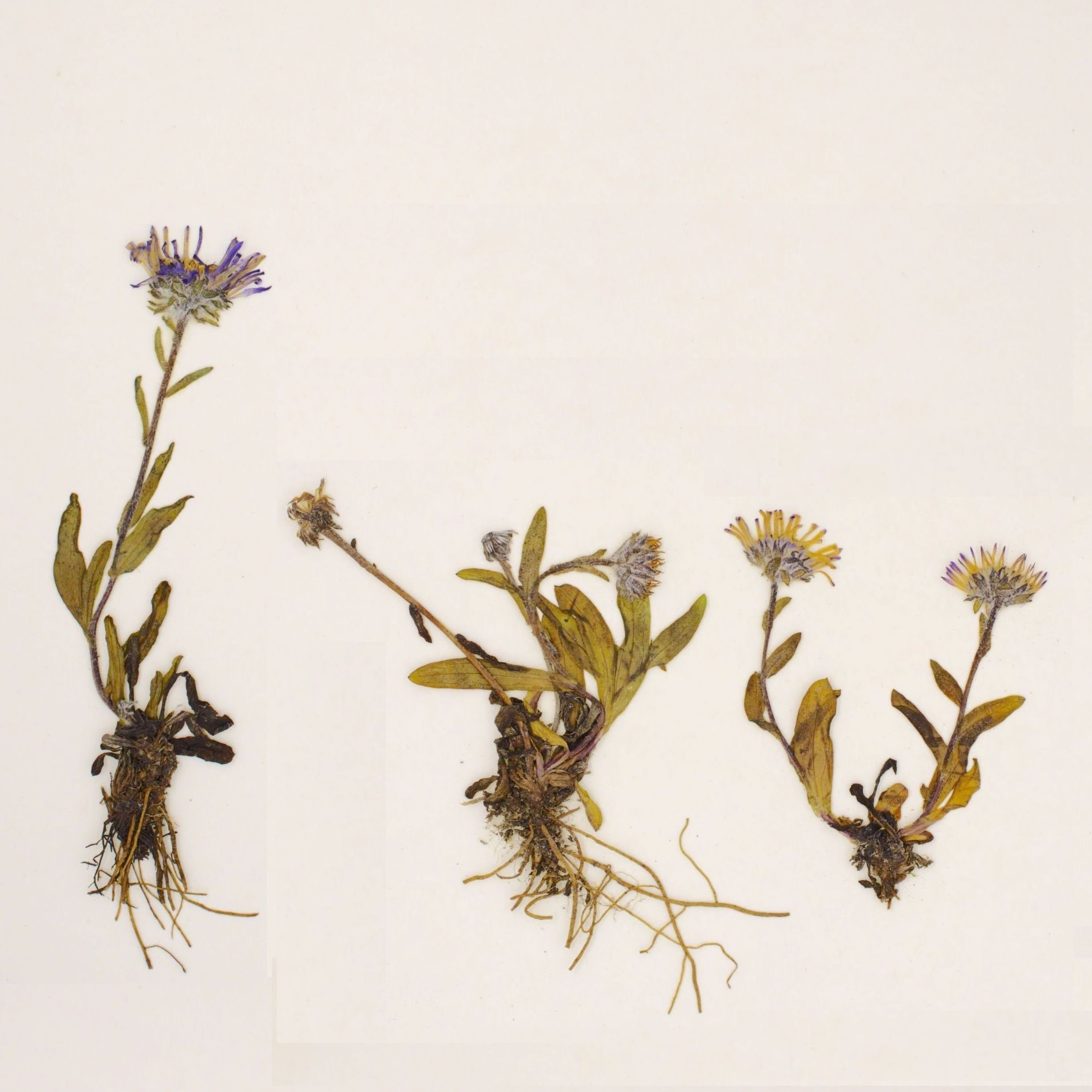
S. pygmaeum herbarium specimen close-ups
