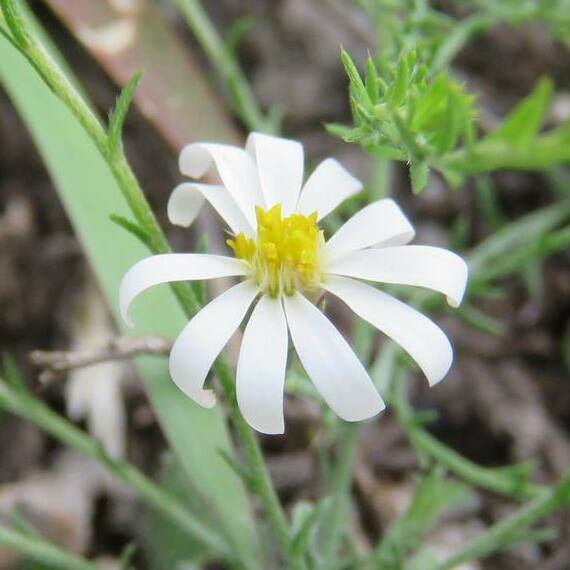
- San Luis de la Paz, Guanajuato, Mexico

Scientific classification
- Kingdom: Plantae
- Clade: Tracheophytes
- Clade: Angiosperms
- Clade: Eudicots
- Clade: Asterids
- Order: Asterales
- Family: Asteraceae
- Tribe: Astereae
- Subtribe: Symphyotrichinae
- Genus: Symphyotrichum
- Subgenus: Symphyotrichum subg. Virgulus
- Section: Symphyotrichum sect. Grandiflori
- Species: S. trilineatum

Binomial name
- Symphyotrichum trilineatum (Sch.Bip. ex Klatt) G.L.Nesom
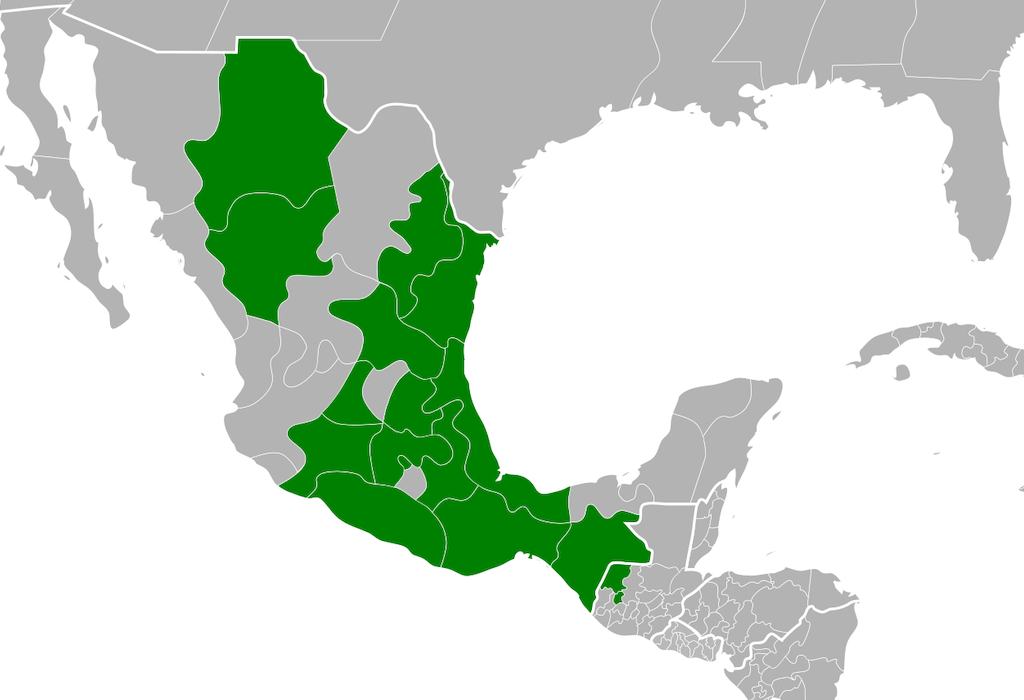
- Native distribution

Synonyms
- Aster trilineatus Sch.Bip. ex Klatt

= Symphyotrichum trilineatum =

Species of plant in the aster family

Symphyotrichum trilineatum (formerly Aster trilineatus) is a species of flowering plant in the family Asteraceae native from Mexico to Guatemala.

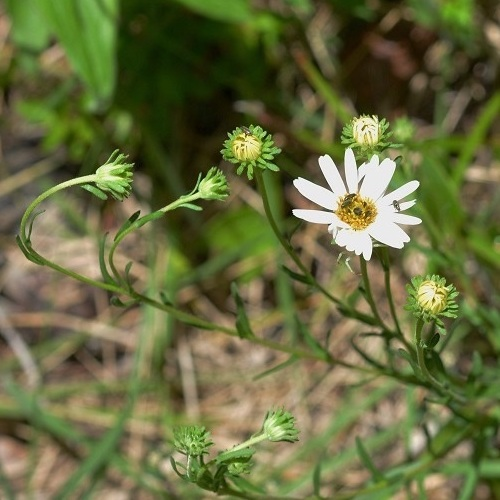
Part of an inflorescence showing involucres, phyllaries, ray florets, and disk florets

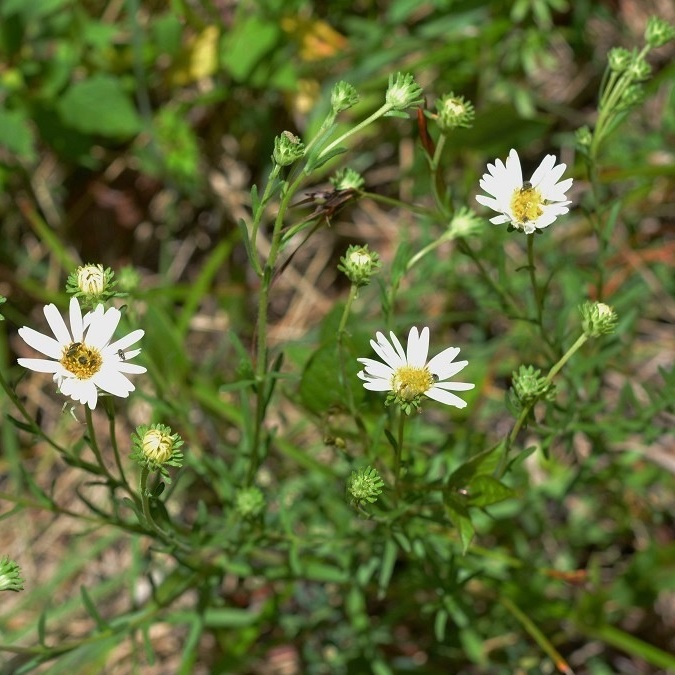
Larger inflorescence

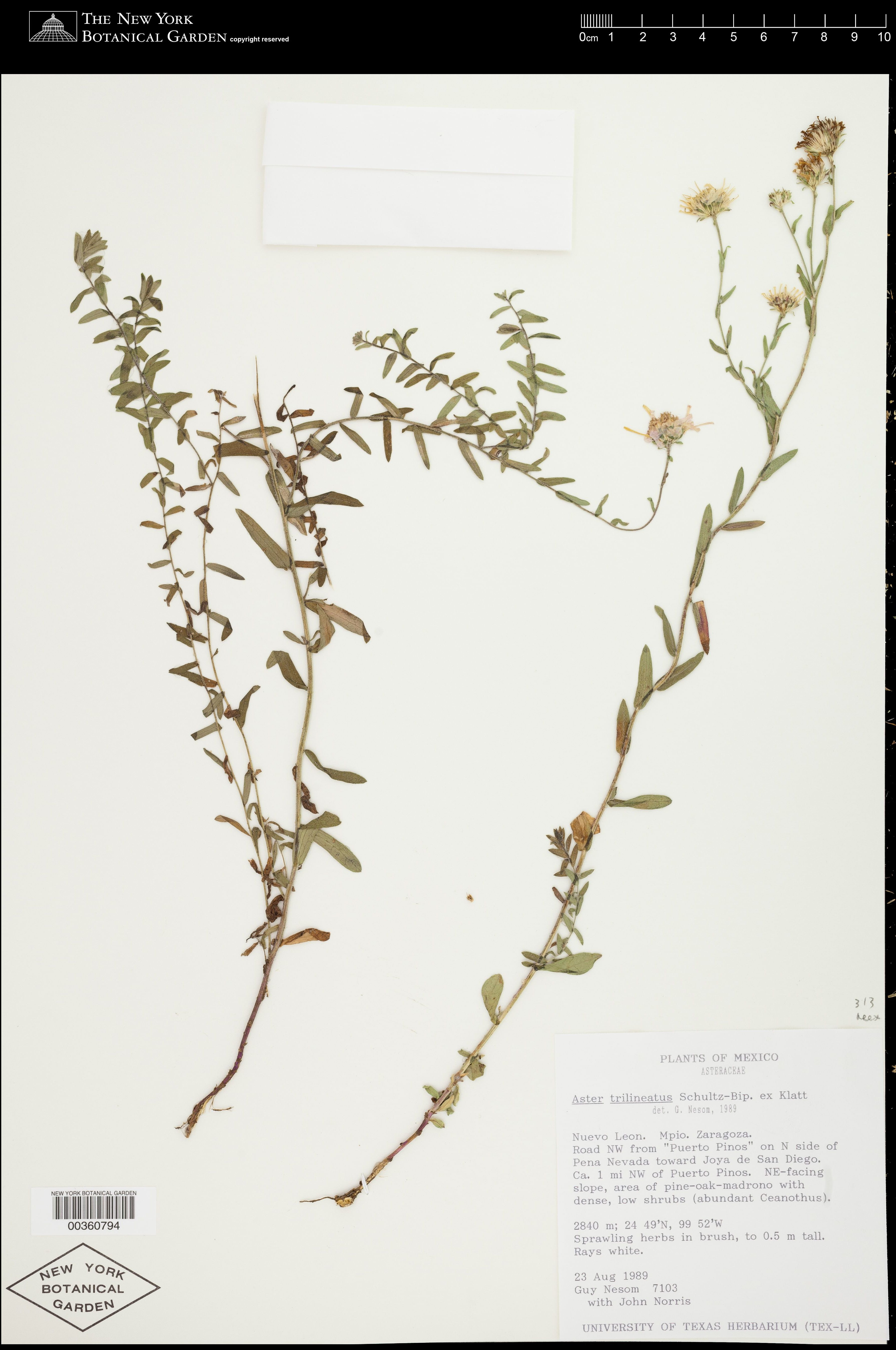
S. trilineatum (Aster trilineatus) herbarium specimen
