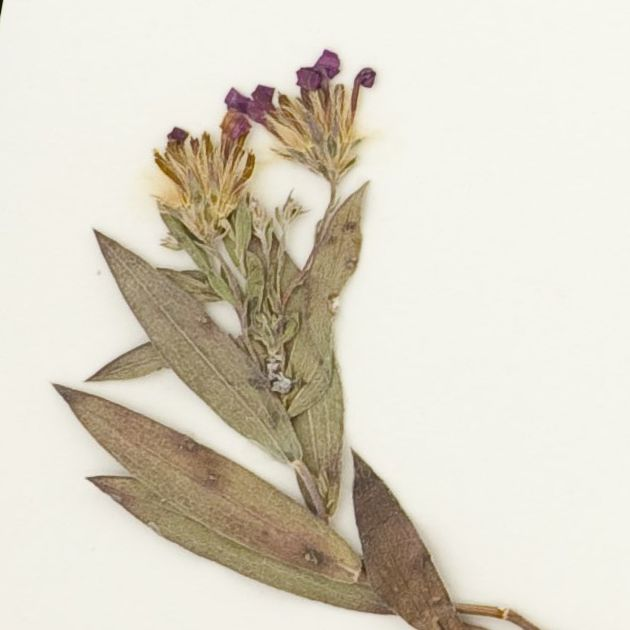
- Close-up of inflorescence

Conservation status
- Near Threatened (IUCN 3.1)

Scientific classification
- Kingdom: Plantae
- Clade: Embryophytes
- Clade: Tracheophytes
- Clade: Spermatophytes
- Clade: Angiosperms
- Clade: Eudicots
- Clade: Asterids
- Order: Asterales
- Family: Asteraceae
- Tribe: Astereae
- Subtribe: Symphyotrichinae
- Genus: Symphyotrichum
- Subgenus: Symphyotrichum subg. Virgulus
- Species: S. lucayanum

Binomial name
- Symphyotrichum lucayanum (Britton) G.L.Nesom
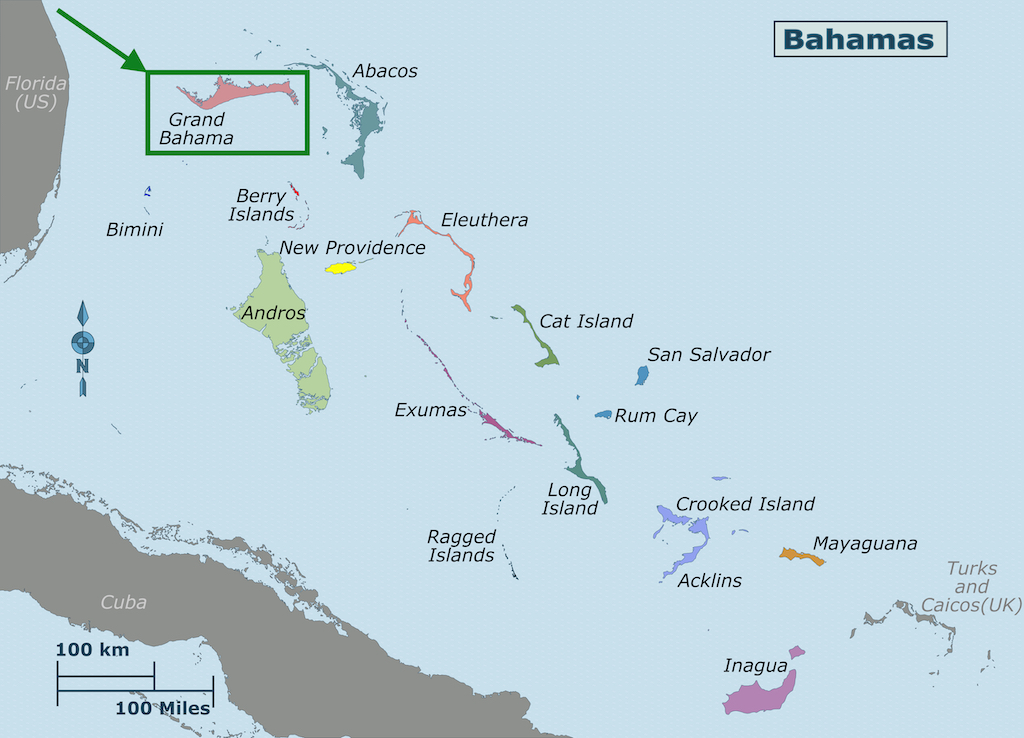
- Endemic to Grand Bahama island

Synonyms
- Aster lucayanus Britton; Virgulus lucayanus (Britton) Reveal & Keener

= Symphyotrichum lucayanum =

Species of plant in the aster family

Symphyotrichum lucayanum (formerly Aster lucayanus) is a species of flowering plant of the aster family (Asteraceae) endemic to the North American island of Grand Bahama.

It has a common name of pineland aster, and it is a perennial, herbaceous plant that may reach 50 centimeters (20 inches) in height. S. lucayanum has purple ray florets.

The holotype for the basionym Aster lucayanus was collected 5 February 1905 at Eight Mile Rock which is roughly at coordinates 26.5462°N 78.8087°W. (Note: These coordinates are near the present-day Eight Mile Rock police station and high school and were obtained through Google Maps.) The holotype is stored in the New York Botanical Garden Steere Herbarium, and a high-definition image of it can be found online.

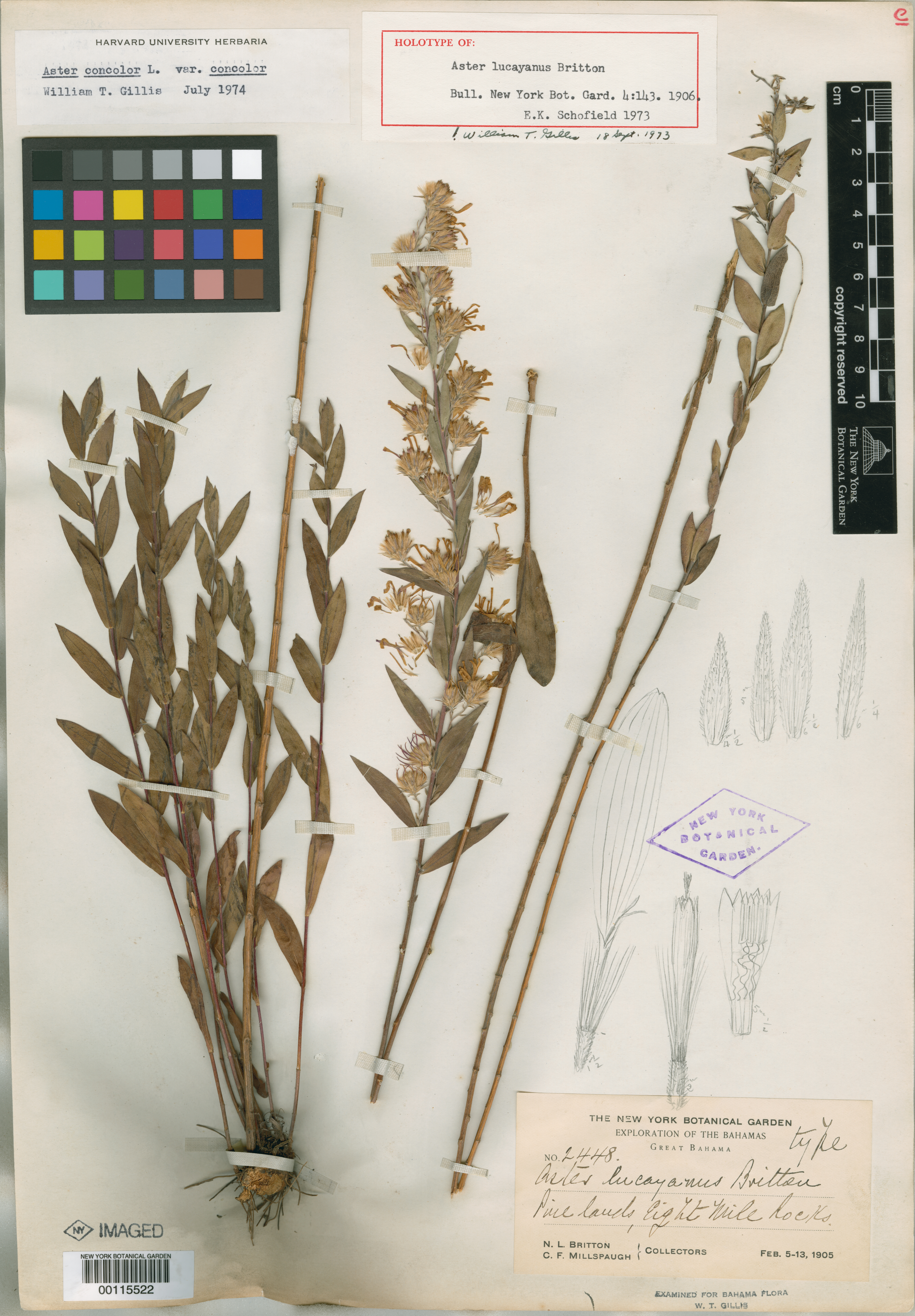
Holotype of Aster lucayanus stored in the NYBG Steere Herbarium
