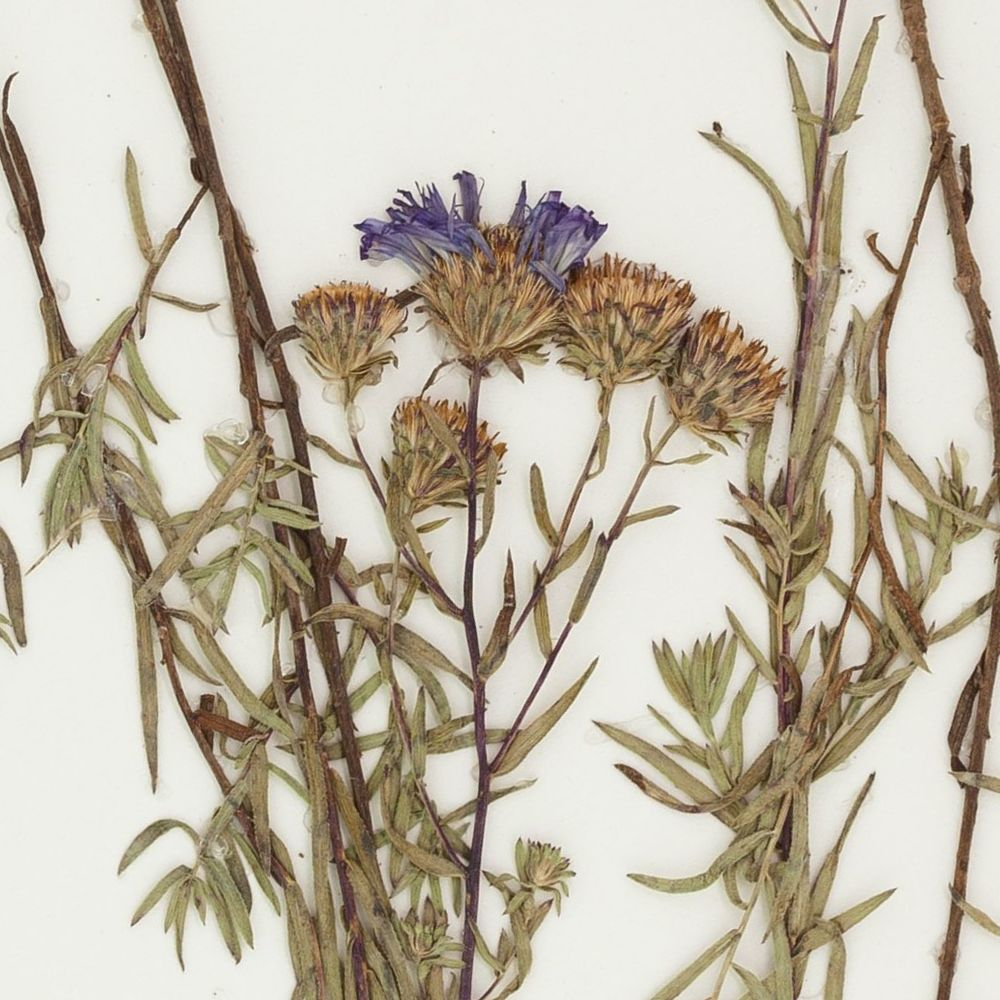

Scientific classification
- Kingdom: Plantae
- Clade: Tracheophytes
- Clade: Angiosperms
- Clade: Eudicots
- Clade: Asterids
- Order: Asterales
- Family: Asteraceae
- Tribe: Astereae
- Subtribe: Symphyotrichinae
- Genus: Symphyotrichum
- Subgenus: Symphyotrichum subg. Virgulus
- Section: Symphyotrichum sect. Grandiflori
- Species: S. turneri

Binomial name
- Symphyotrichum turneri (S.D.Sundb. & A.G.Jones) G.L.Nesom
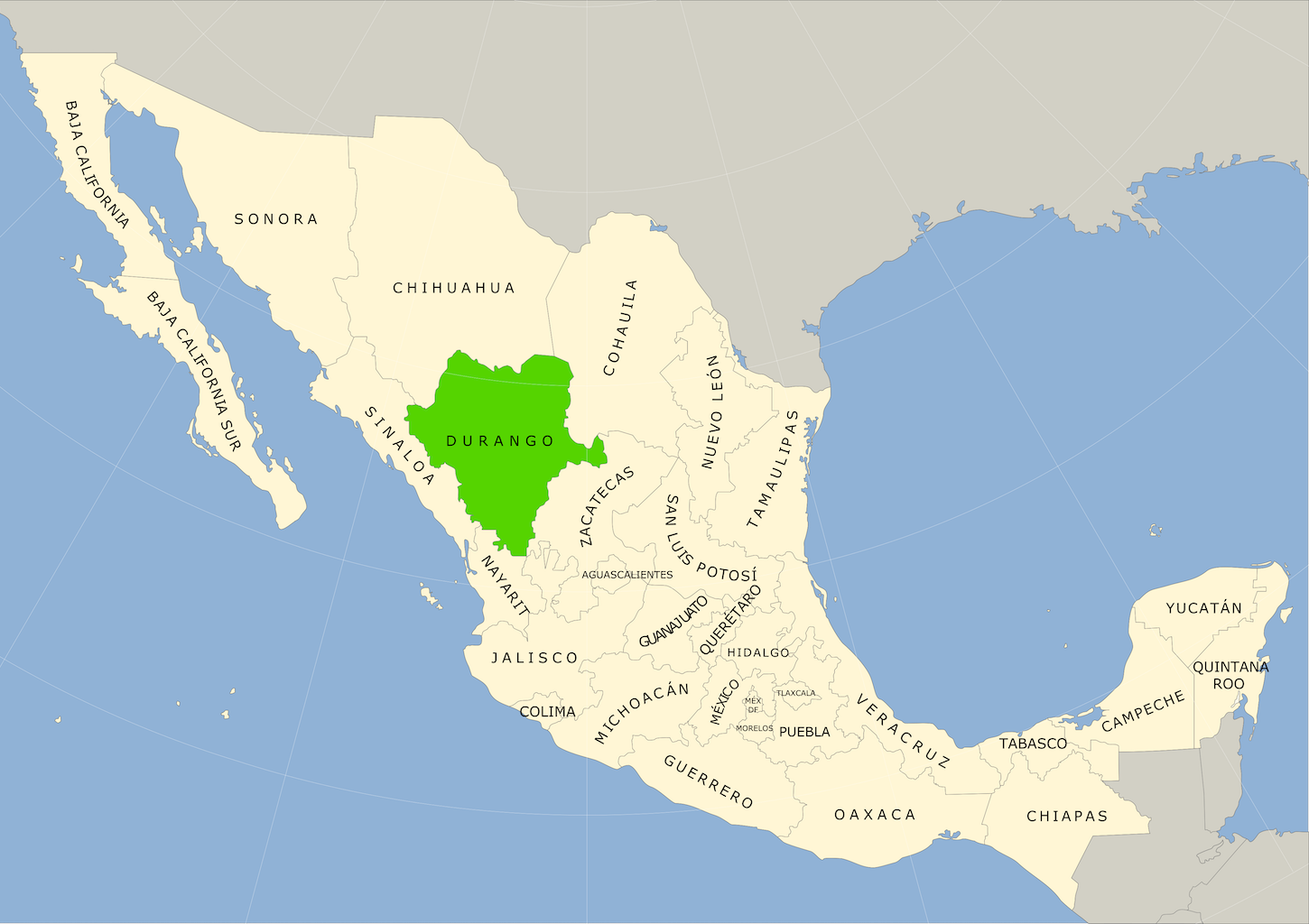
- Native distribution

Synonyms
- Aster moranensis var. turneri S.D.Sundb. & A.G.Jones; Symphyotrichum moranense var. turneri (S.D.Sundb. & A.G.Jones) G.L.Nesom

= Symphyotrichum turneri =

Species of plant in the aster family

Symphyotrichum turneri (formerly Aster moranensis var. turneri) is a species of flowering plant in the family Asteraceae native to Durango, Mexico.

== Description ==
Symphyotrichum turneri is a perennial, herbaceous, flowering plant that grows to heights of 33–43 centimeters (13–17 inches). Its blue to purple ray florets open October–March.

== Taxonomy ==
The basionym of Symphyotrichum turneri is Aster moranensis var. turneri, first described by American botanists Scott D. Sundberg and Almut Gitter Jones in 1986.

The specific epithet "turneri" is the Latinisation of surname "Turner" for the late Billie Lee Turner, American botanist and professor of botany at the University of Texas at Austin.

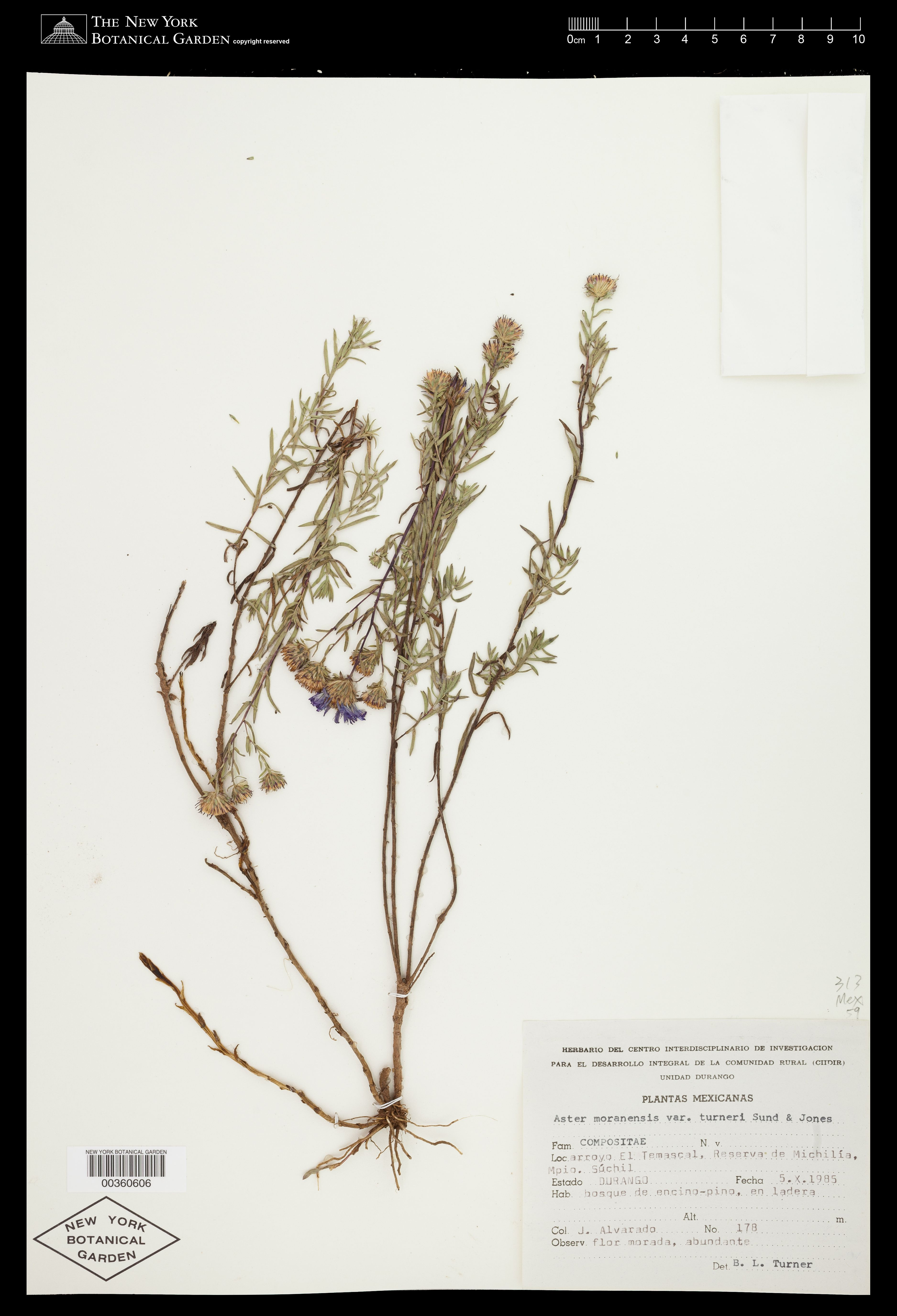
S. turneri herbarium specimen

== Distribution and habitat ==
The species is native to Durango, Mexico where it grows in woods, along waterways, and in wet pastures at elevations of 2,050–2,750 meters (6,730–9,020 feet).
