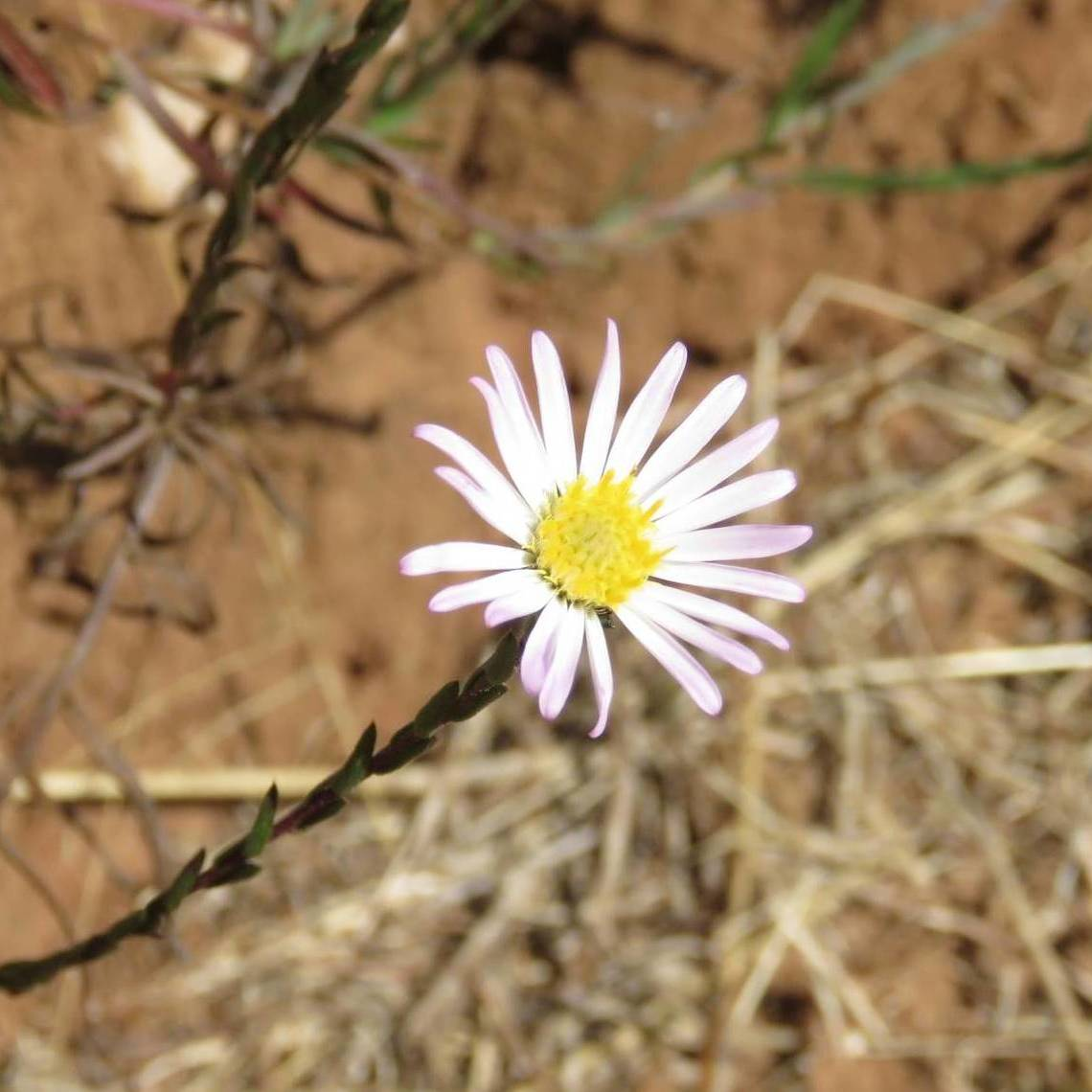
- Acuitzio, Michoacán, Mexico

Scientific classification
- Kingdom: Plantae
- Clade: Tracheophytes
- Clade: Angiosperms
- Clade: Eudicots
- Clade: Asterids
- Order: Asterales
- Family: Asteraceae
- Tribe: Astereae
- Subtribe: Symphyotrichinae
- Genus: Symphyotrichum
- Subgenus: Symphyotrichum subg. Virgulus
- Section: Symphyotrichum sect. Grandiflori
- Species: S. moranense

Binomial name
- Symphyotrichum moranense (Kunth) G.L.Nesom
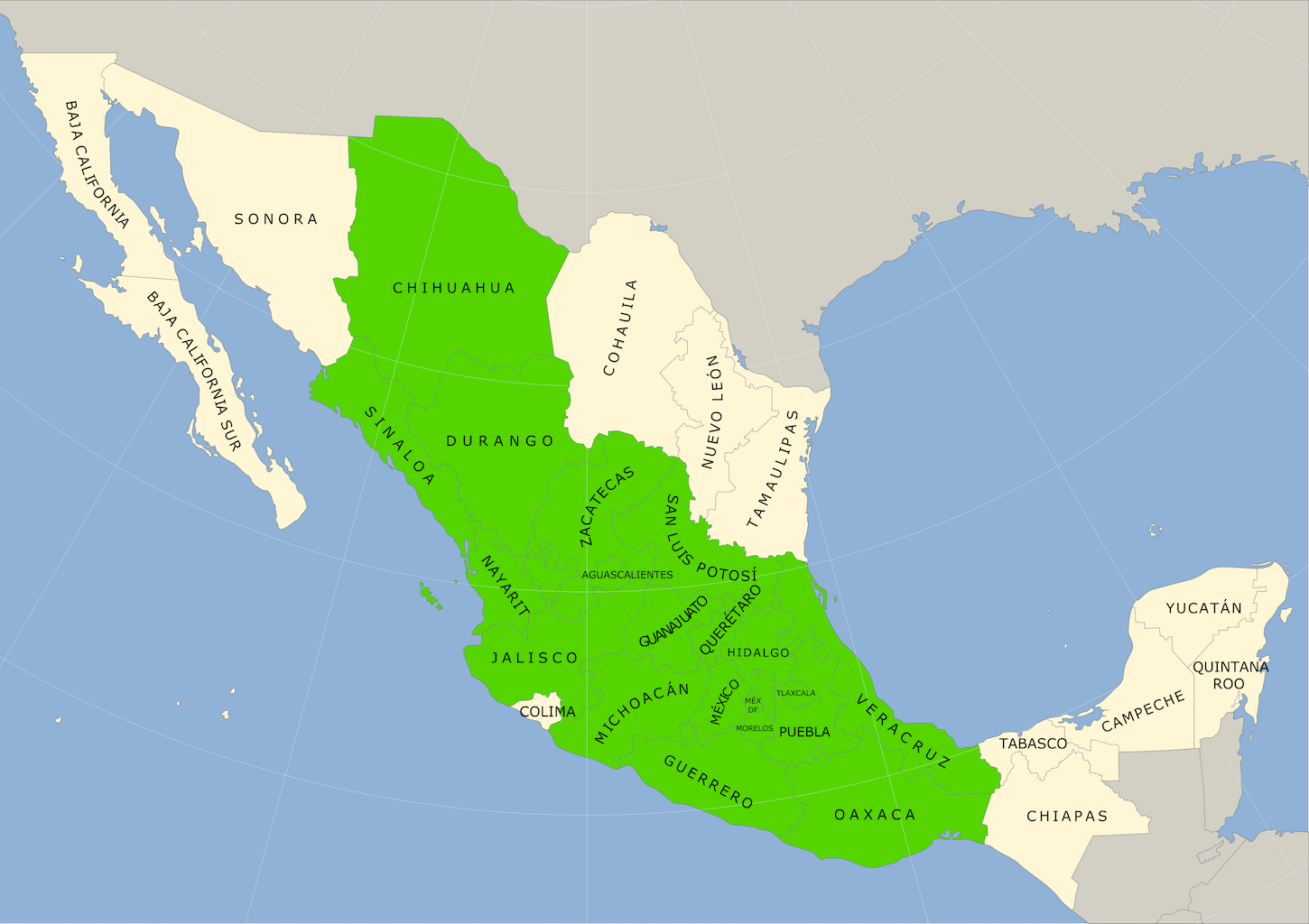
- Native distribution

Synonyms
- Basionym: Aster moranensis Kunth; Alphabetical list: Aster lima Lindl.; Aster lindenii Sch.Bip.; Diplostephium moranense Nees; Virgulus lima (Lindl.) Reveal & Keener; Virgulus moranensis (Kunth) Reveal & Keener

= Symphyotrichum moranense =

Species of plant in the aster family

Symphyotrichum moranense (formerly Aster moranensis) is a species of flowering plant in the family Asteraceae. It is a perennial and herbaceous plant that reaches about 90 centimeters (35 inches) in height. Its white ray florets open October through April, and it is native to Mexico.

== Gallery ==
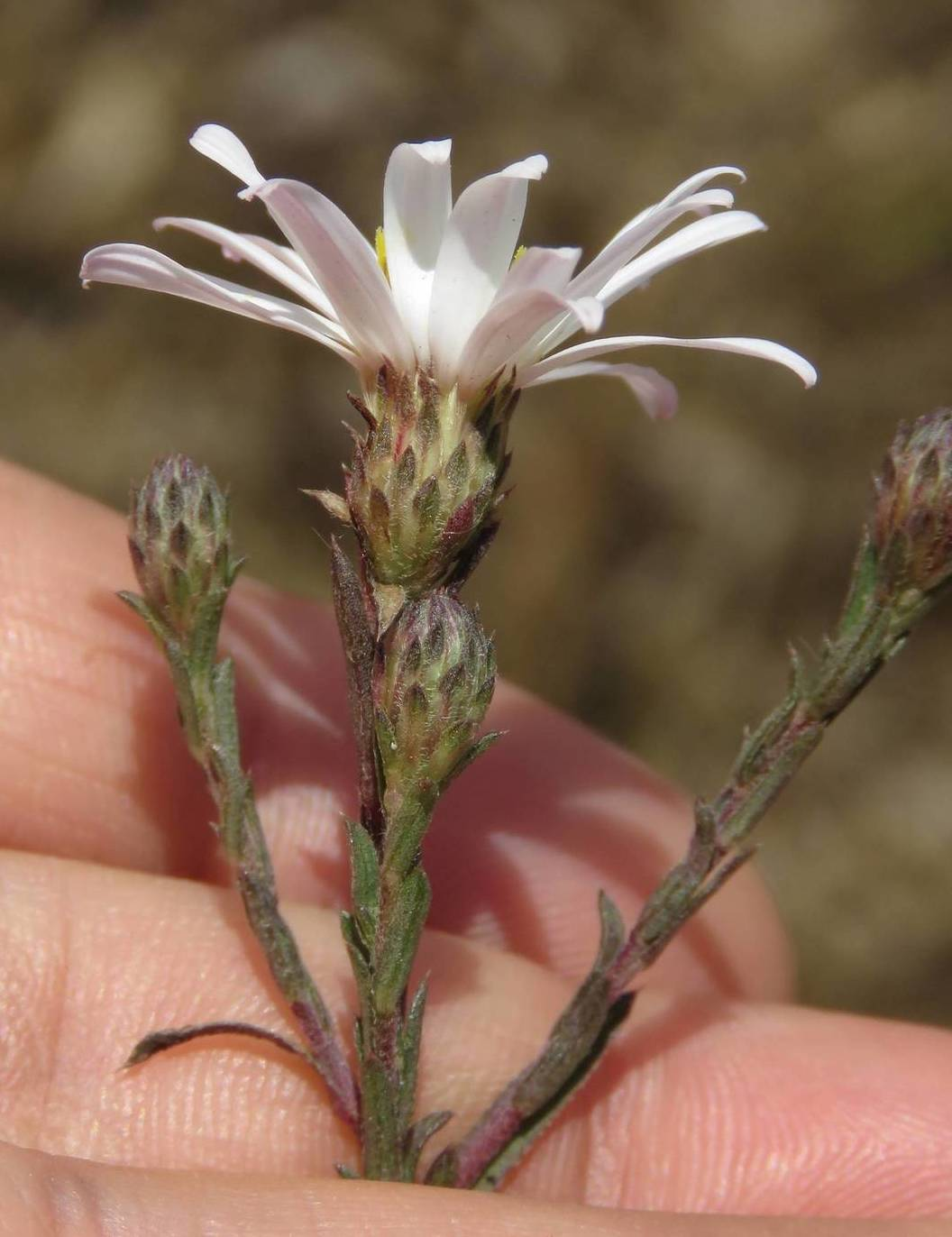

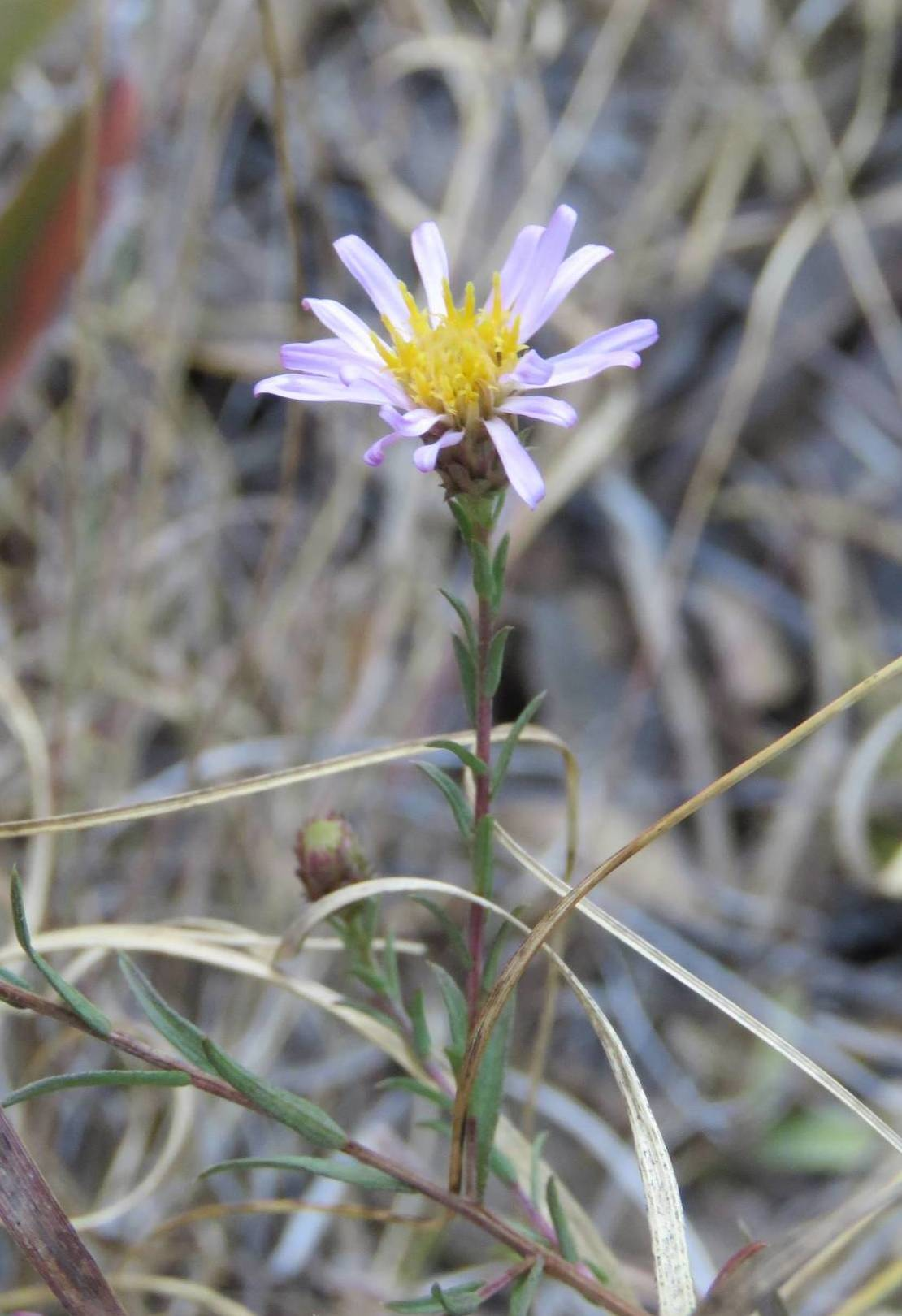

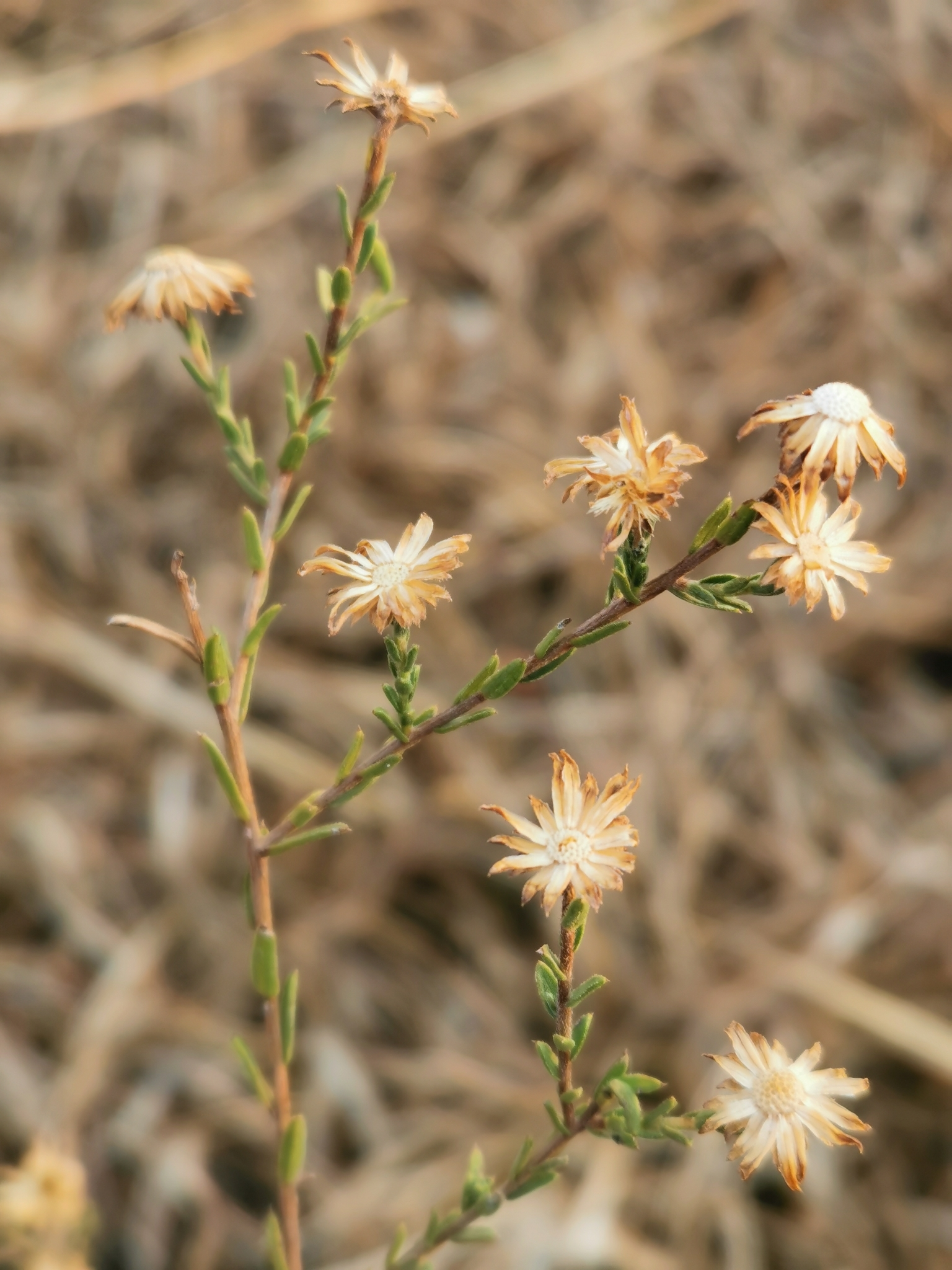

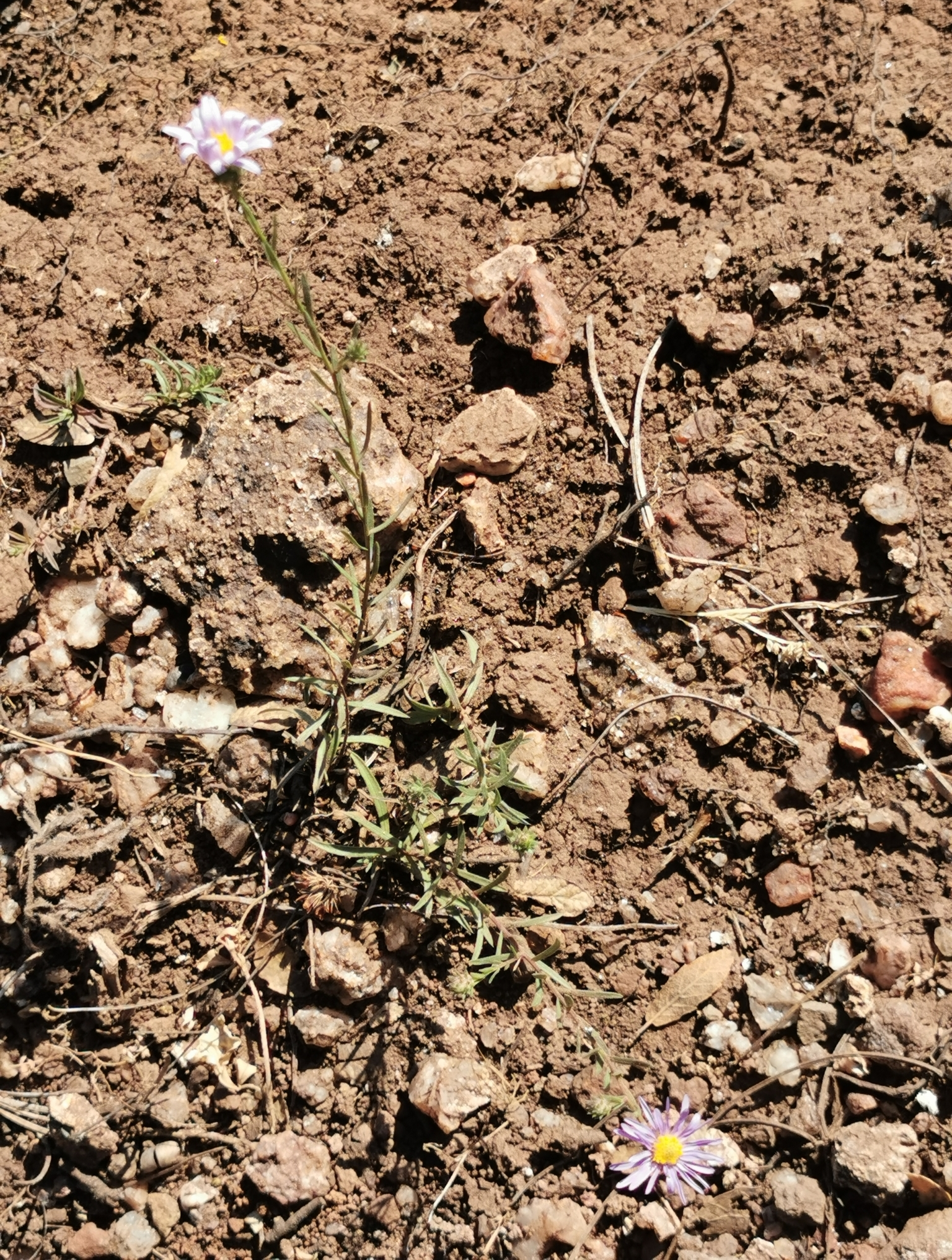

== Distribution and habitat ==
Symphyotrichum moranense is native to the Mexican states of Aguascalientes, Chihuahua, Durango, Guanajuato, Guerrero, Hidalgo, Jalisco, México, Michoacán, Morelos, Nayarit, Oaxaca, Puebla, Querétaro, San Luis Potosí, Sinaloa, Tlaxcala, Veracruz, and Zacatecas, as well as in the Distrito Federal.

It grows in grasslands and woodlands at elevations of 1,000–2,750 meters (3,280–9,020 feet).
