= Luc Brouillet =

Canadian botanist

- Born: 1954 (age 71–72)
- Education: University of Waterloo, PhD; Université de Montréal, MSc.
- Known for: Molecular research of Asteraceae; Flora of North America Project
- Scientific career
- Fields: Botany
- Workplaces: Institut de recherche en biologie végétale, Université de Montréal
- Author abbrev. (botany): Brouillet

Luc Brouillet (born 1954) is a Canadian botanist. He has focused his research on genetics of the Asteraceae family, flora of Quebec-Labrador and Newfoundland, and has been significantly involved in the Flora of North America project. In 2016 the Canadian Botanical Association awarded him the George Lawson Medal.

The standard author abbreviation Brouillet is used to indicate this person as the author when citing a botanical name.
