= Symphyotrichum patagonicum =

Scientific classification
- Kingdom: Plantae
- Clade: Tracheophytes
- Clade: Angiosperms
- Clade: Eudicots
- Clade: Asterids
- Order: Asterales
- Family: Asteraceae
- Tribe: Astereae
- Subtribe: Symphyotrichinae
- Genus: Symphyotrichum
- Subgenus: Symphyotrichum subg. Astropolium
- Species: S. patagonicum

Binomial name
- Symphyotrichum patagonicum (Cabrera) G.L.Nesom
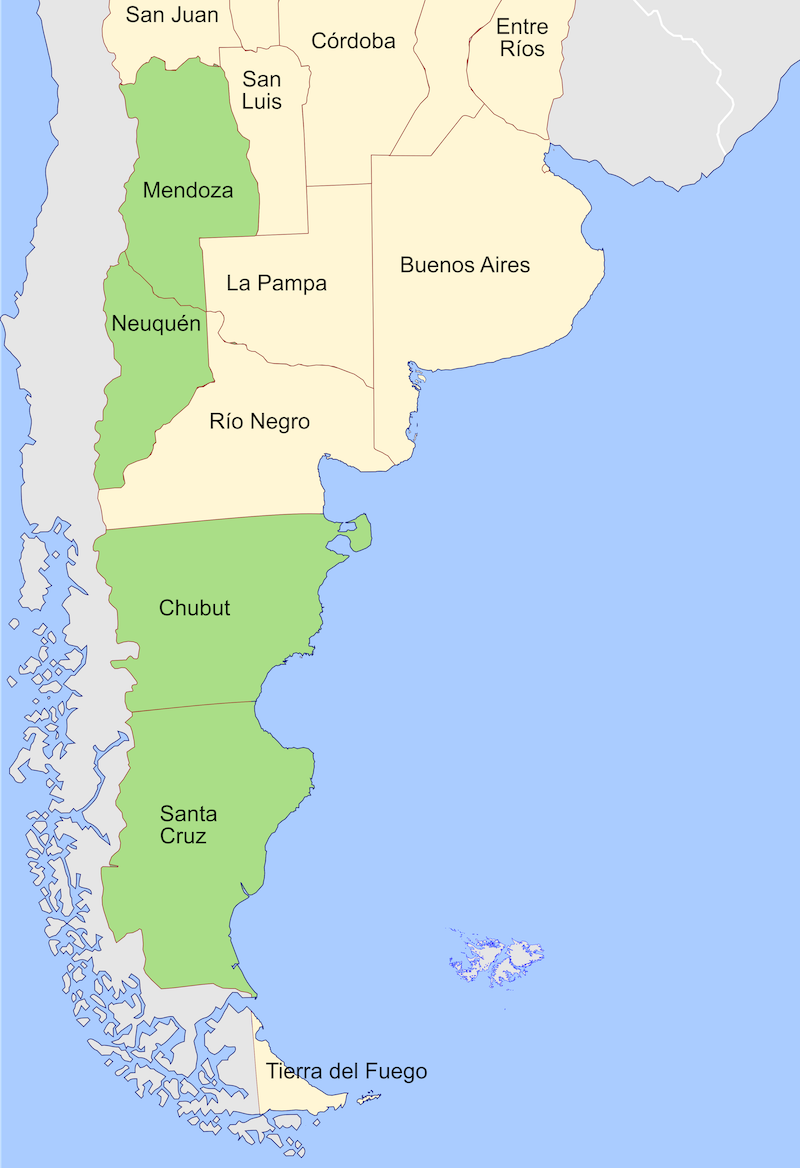
- Native distribution

Synonyms
- Aster patagonicus Cabrera

Species of flowering plant in the daisy family

Symphyotrichum patagonicum (formerly Aster patagonicus) is a species of flowering plant in the family Asteraceae endemic to the Argentinian provinces of Chubut, Mendoza, Neuquén, and Santa Cruz. It is an annual, herbaceous plant that grows 3 to 30 centimeters (1 to 12 inches) tall. Its flowers have short white ray florets in 3 or 4 series and numerous disk florets.
