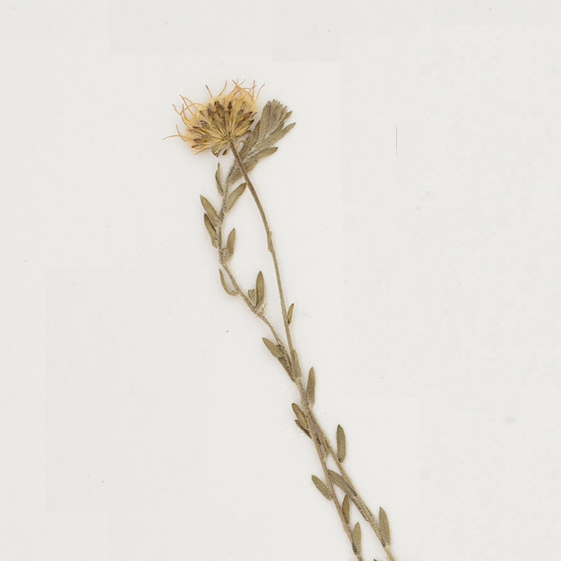

Scientific classification
- Kingdom: Plantae
- Clade: Tracheophytes
- Clade: Angiosperms
- Clade: Eudicots
- Clade: Asterids
- Order: Asterales
- Family: Asteraceae
- Tribe: Astereae
- Subtribe: Symphyotrichinae
- Genus: Symphyotrichum
- Subgenus: Symphyotrichum subg. Virgulus
- Section: Symphyotrichum sect. Grandiflori
- Species: S. bimater

Binomial name
- Symphyotrichum bimater (Standl. & Steyerm.) G.L.Nesom
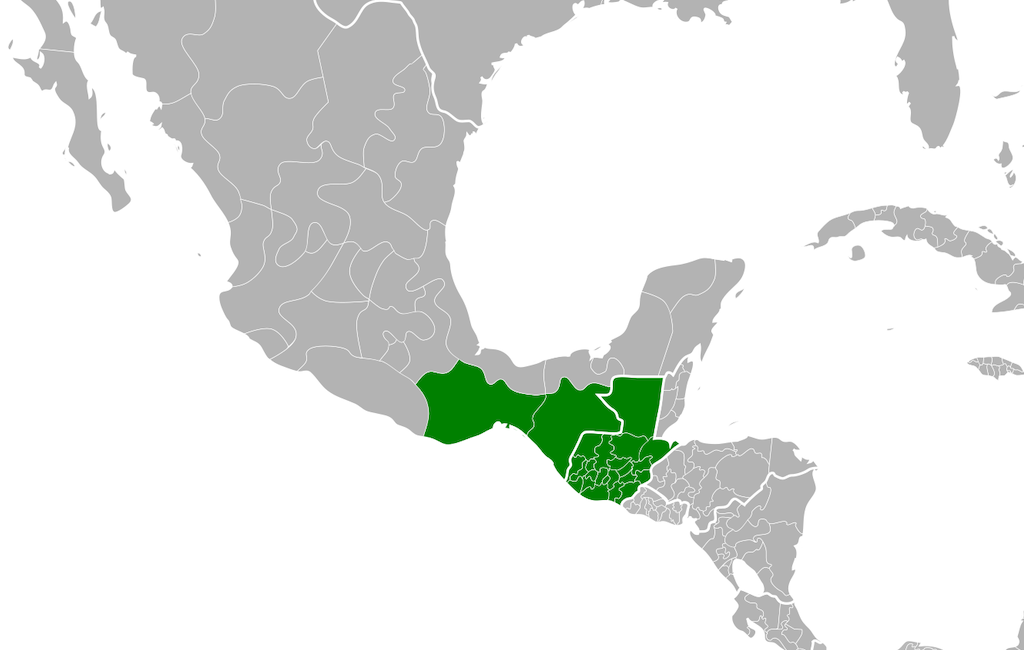
- Native distribution

Synonyms
- Aster bimater Standl. & Steyerm.; Virgulus bimater (Standl. & Steyerm.) Reveal & Keener

= Symphyotrichum bimater =

Species of flowering plant in the daisy family

Symphyotrichum bimater (formerly Aster bimater) is a species of flowering plant in the family Asteraceae that is native to the states of Chiapas and Oaxaca in Mexico, and to Guatemala. It is perennial and herbaceous and grows to heights of 30–46 centimeters (12–18 inches). Its white ray florets bloom May–December, and it grows in pine-oak woods, ravines, slopes, and grassy openings at elevations 1,000–2,150 meters (3,280–7,050 feet).

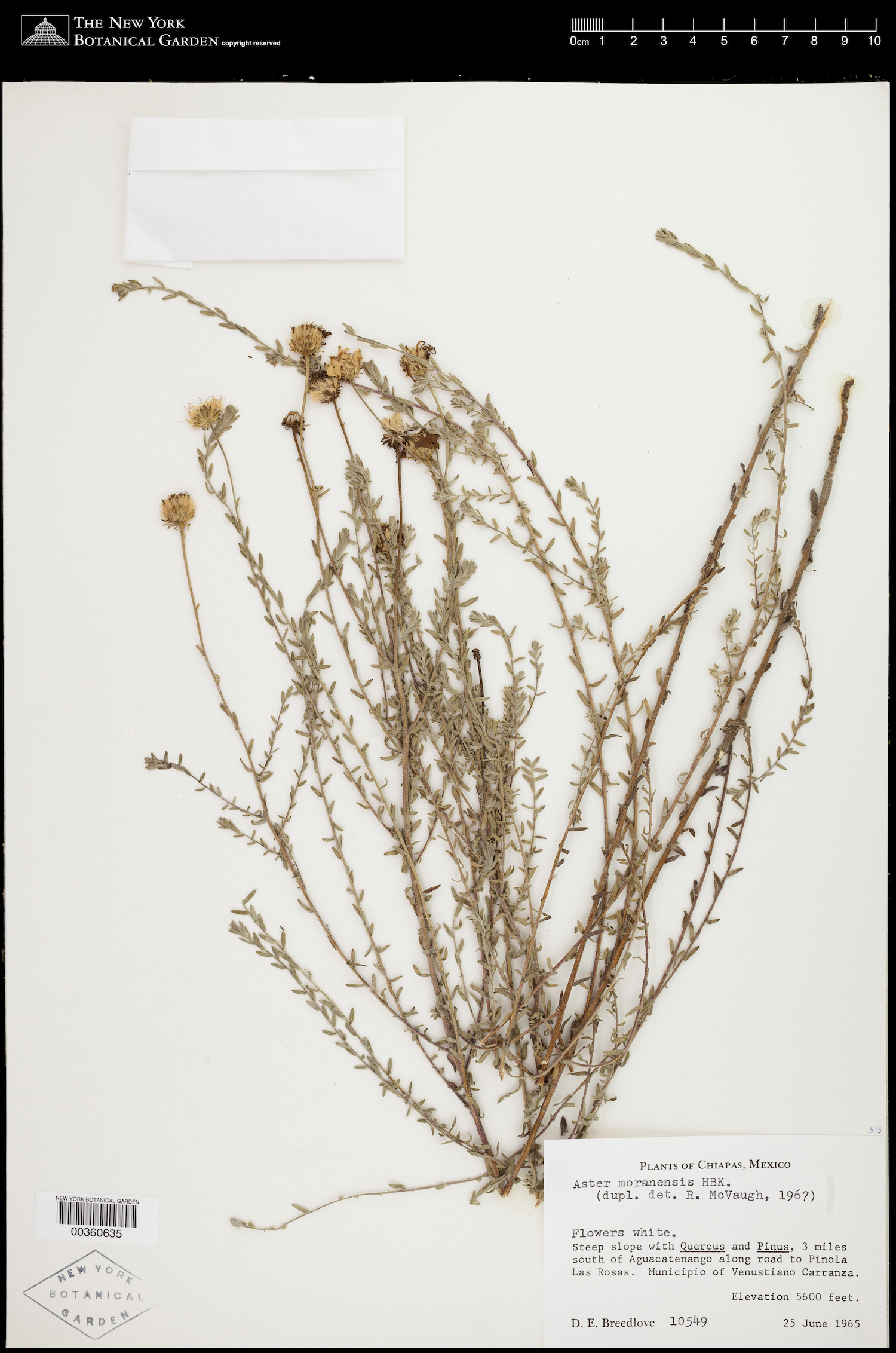
Symphyotrichum bimater specimen from the New York Botanical Garden Steere Herbarium
