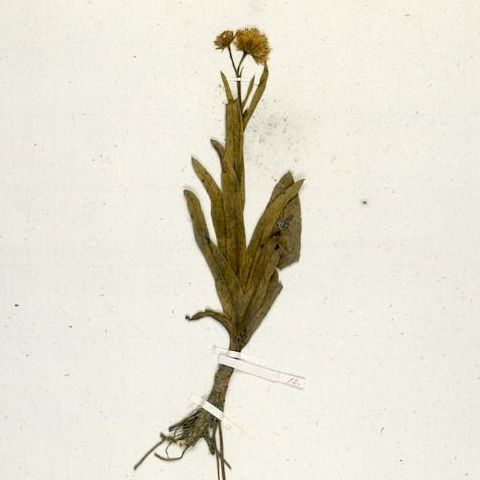

Scientific classification
- Kingdom: Plantae
- Clade: Tracheophytes
- Clade: Angiosperms
- Clade: Eudicots
- Clade: Asterids
- Order: Asterales
- Family: Asteraceae
- Tribe: Astereae
- Subtribe: Symphyotrichinae
- Genus: Symphyotrichum
- Subgenus: Symphyotrichum subg. Astropolium
- Species: S. martii

Binomial name
- Symphyotrichum martii (Baker) G.L.Nesom
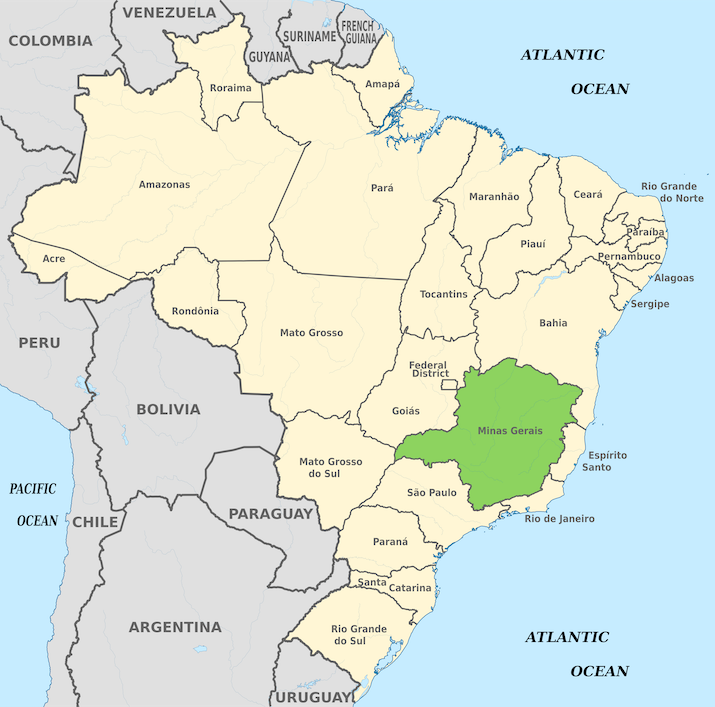
- Native distribution

Synonyms
- Aster martii Baker

= Symphyotrichum martii =

Species of plant in the aster family

Symphyotrichum martii (formerly Aster martii) is a species of flowering plant in the family Asteraceae endemic to Minas Gerais, Brazil. It is a perennial, herbaceous, hairless plant whose flowers have about 30 white ray florets.

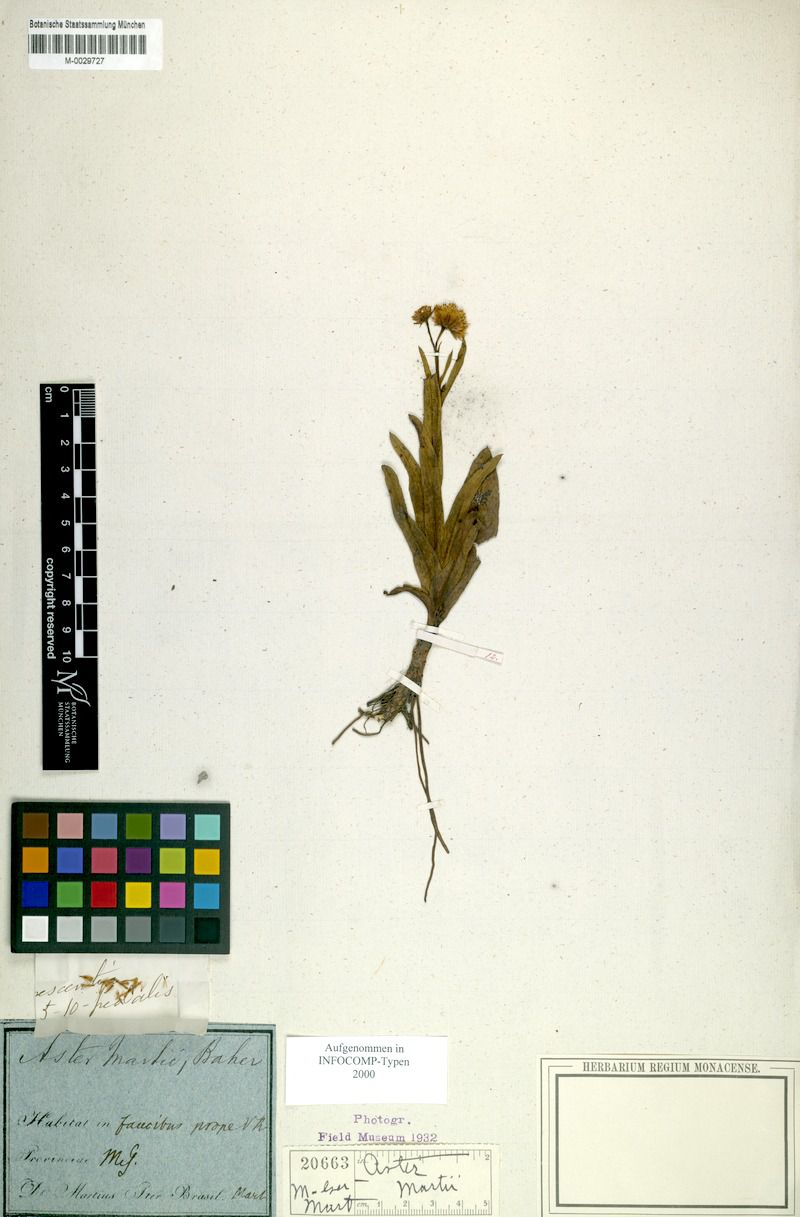
Aster martii holotype
