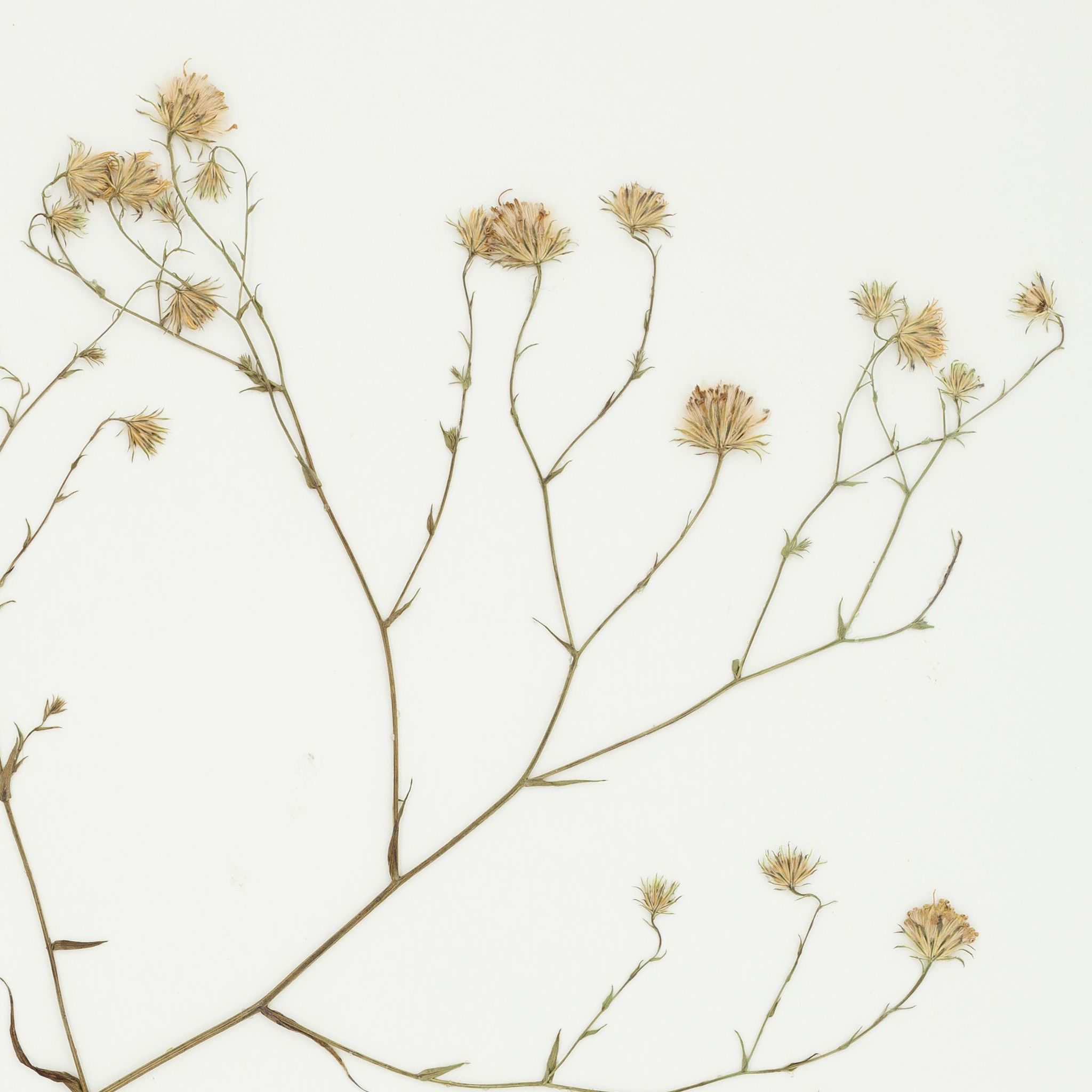

Scientific classification
- Kingdom: Plantae
- Clade: Tracheophytes
- Clade: Angiosperms
- Clade: Eudicots
- Clade: Asterids
- Order: Asterales
- Family: Asteraceae
- Tribe: Astereae
- Subtribe: Symphyotrichinae
- Genus: Symphyotrichum
- Subgenus: Symphyotrichum subg. Astropolium
- Species: S. regnellii

Binomial name
- Symphyotrichum regnellii (Baker) G.L.Nesom
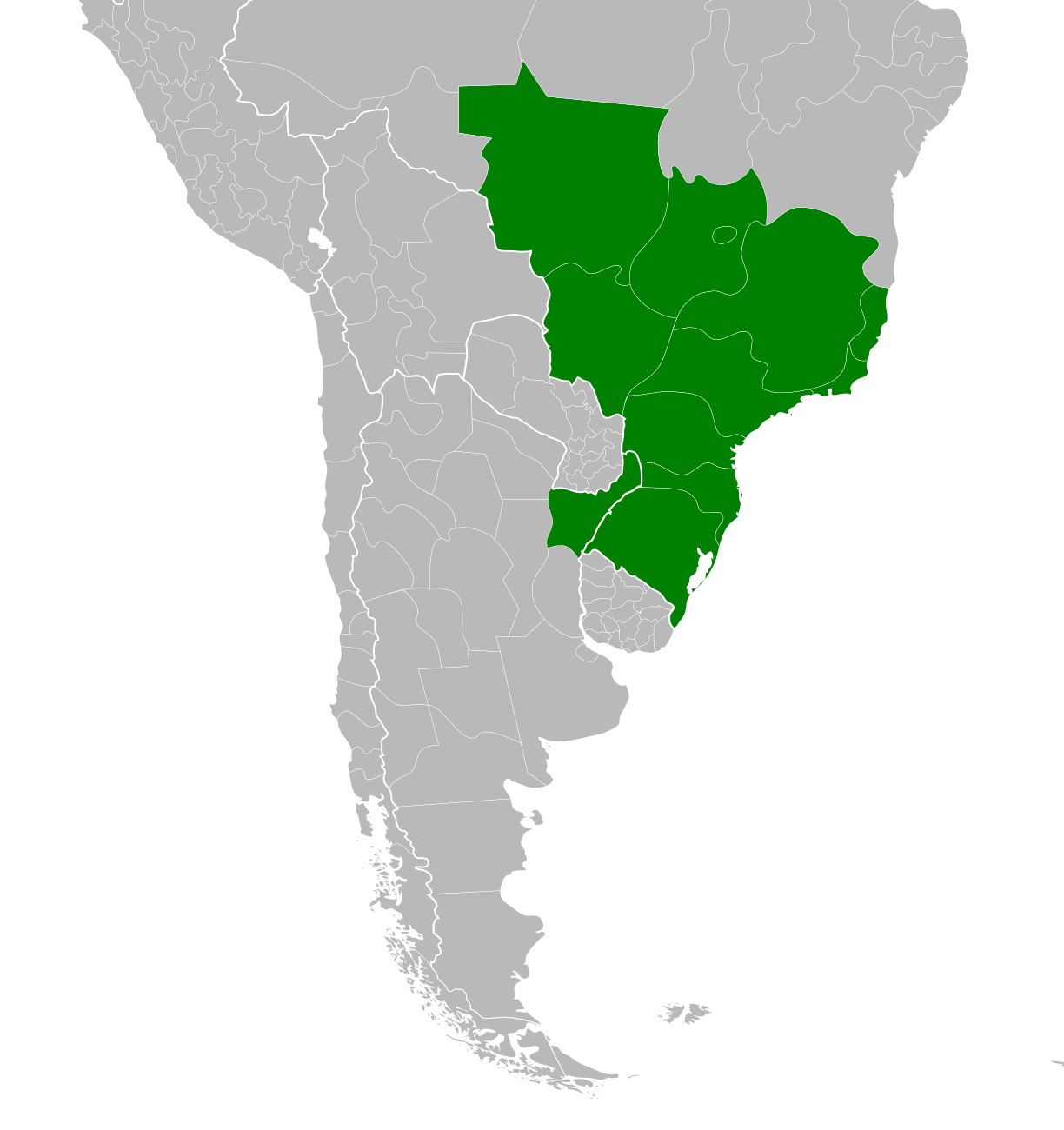
- Native distribution in green

Synonyms
- Aster regnellii Baker; Aster regnellii subsp. mattogrosensis Malme; Erigeron regnellii Sch.Bip.

= Symphyotrichum regnellii =

Species of flowering plant in the daisy family

Symphyotrichum regnellii (formerly Aster regnellii) is a species of herbaceous flowering plants in the family Asteraceae native to Argentina and Brazil. It grows to heights of 60 to 120 centimetres (24 to 47 in), and its flowers have white to pink ray florets that have lengths up to 3 millimetres. It grows in swamps and wet savannas.

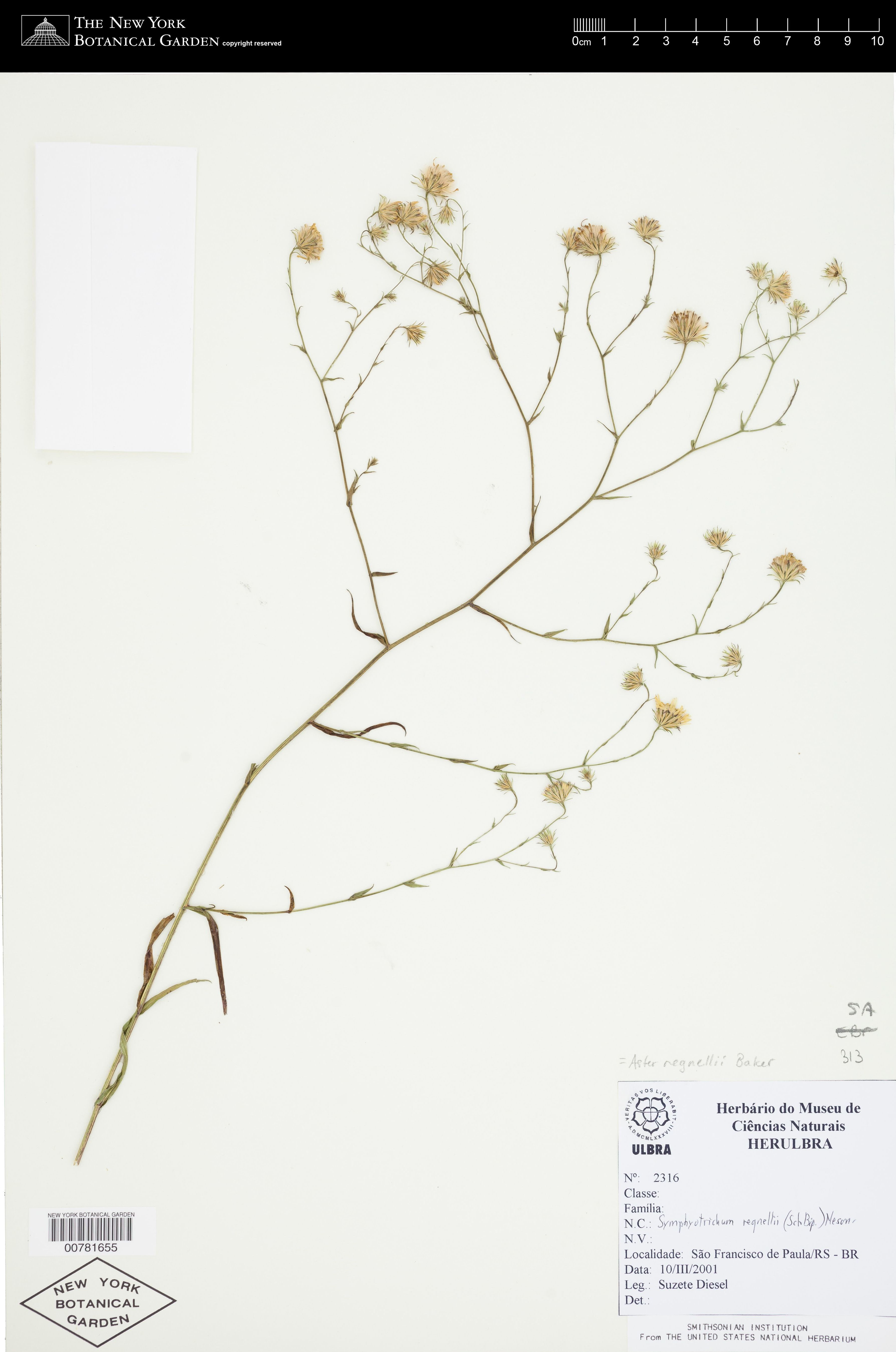
S. regnelli specimen held at the New York Botanical Garden, collected 10 March 2001, Rio Grande do Sul, Brazil

== Distribution ==
Symphyotrichum regnellii is native to Argentina and Brazil, specifically in the following jurisdictions. In Argentina, it is native to the provinces of Corrientes and Misiones. In Brazil, it is native to the states of Goiás, Minas Gerais, Paraná, Rio Grande do Sul, Santa Catarina, and São Paulo, as well as the Federal District.
