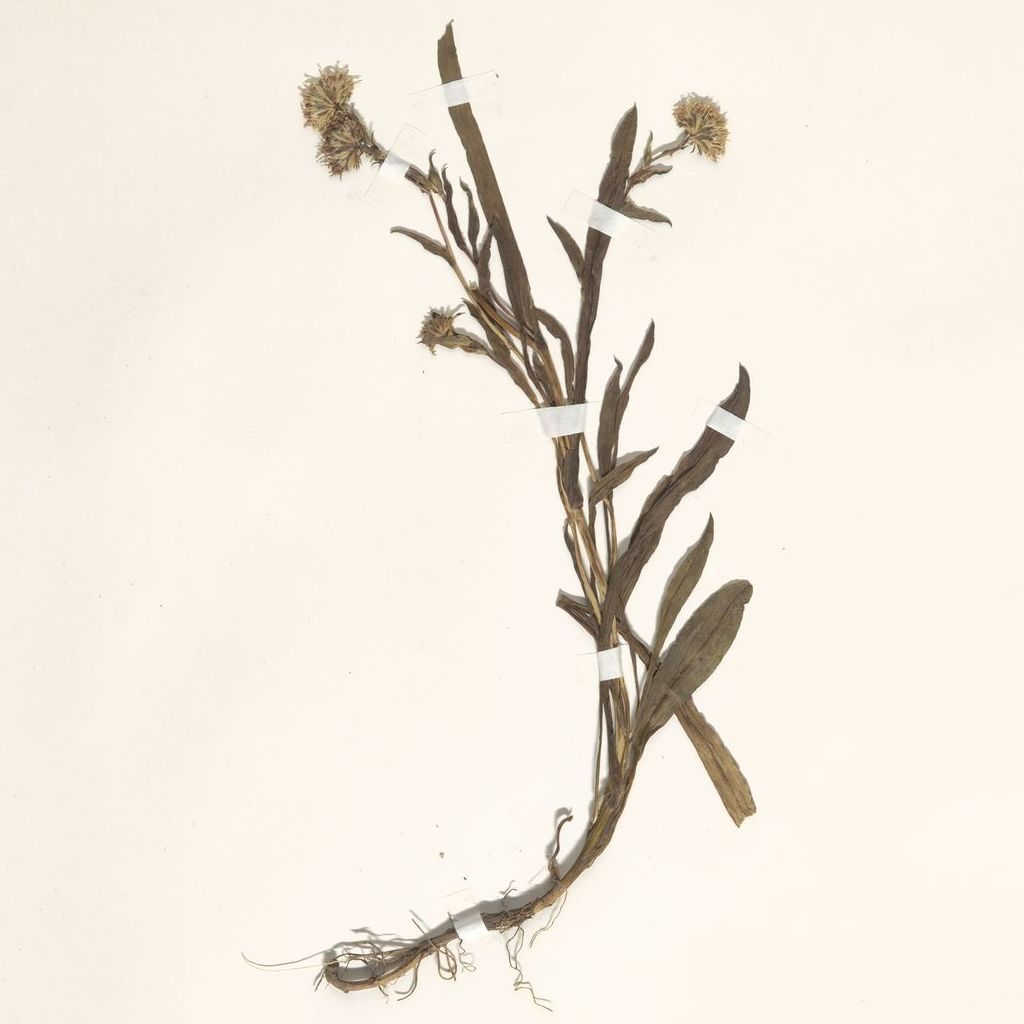

Scientific classification
- Kingdom: Plantae
- Clade: Tracheophytes
- Clade: Angiosperms
- Clade: Eudicots
- Clade: Asterids
- Order: Asterales
- Family: Asteraceae
- Tribe: Astereae
- Subtribe: Symphyotrichinae
- Genus: Symphyotrichum
- Subgenus: Symphyotrichum subg. Astropolium
- Species: S. peteroanum

Binomial name
- Symphyotrichum peteroanum (Phil.) G.L.Nesom
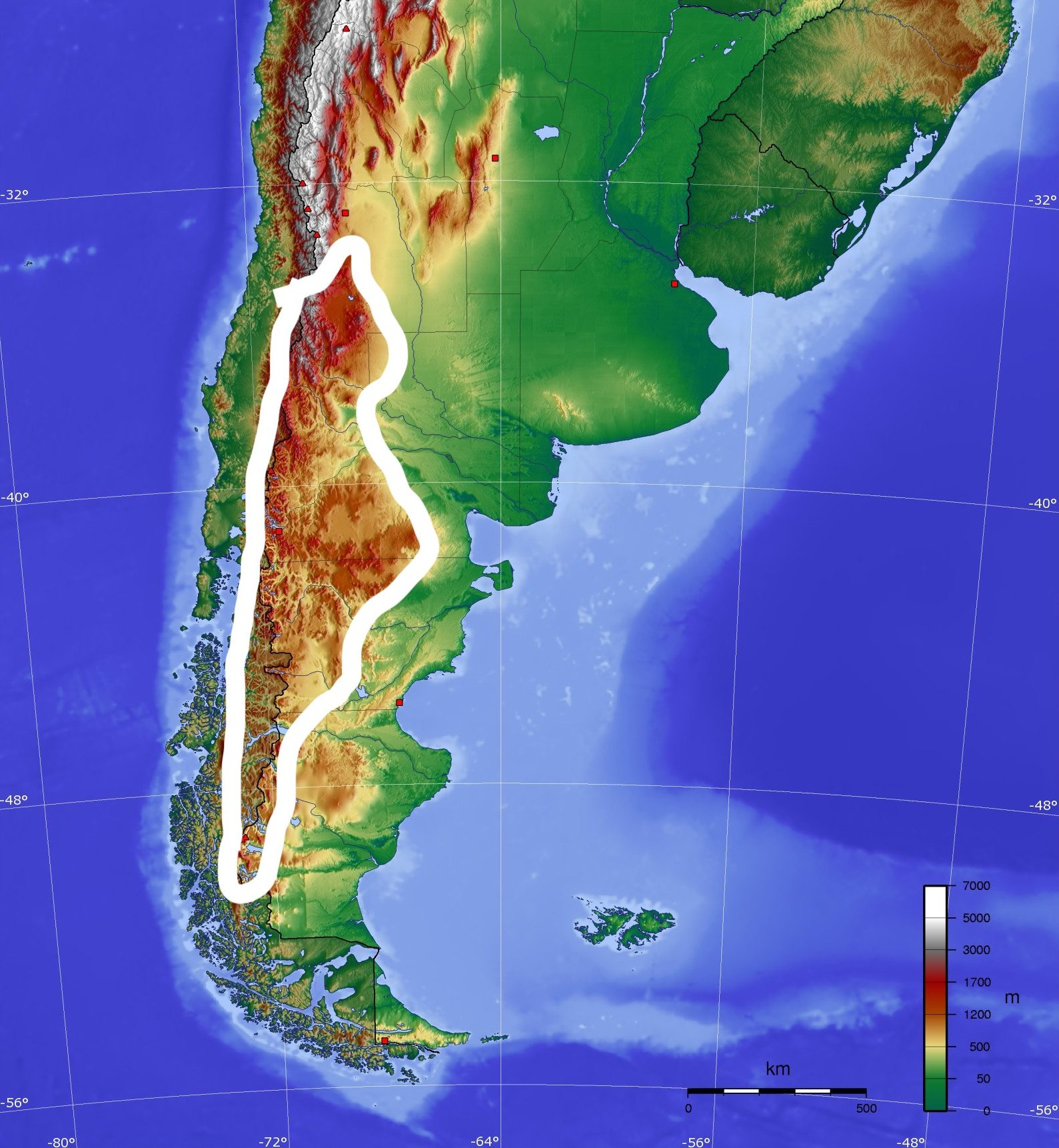
- Native distribution outlined in white

Synonyms
- Aster peteroanus Phil.; Aster vahlii var. latifolius Cabrera

= Symphyotrichum peteroanum =

Species of flowering plant in the daisy family

Symphyotrichum peteroanum (formerly Aster peteroanus) is a species of flowering plant in the family Asteraceae endemic to Argentina and Chile. It is a perennial, herbaceous plant that grows 20 to 60 centimeters (8 to 24 inches) tall. Its flowers have white ray florets in one series that are 6–8 millimeters (1/4–3/10 inch) long. It grows in tall forests with trees that exceed 15 meters (50 feet) at elevations of 1,000–2,200 meters (3,280–7,220 feet) in humid montane ecosystems.

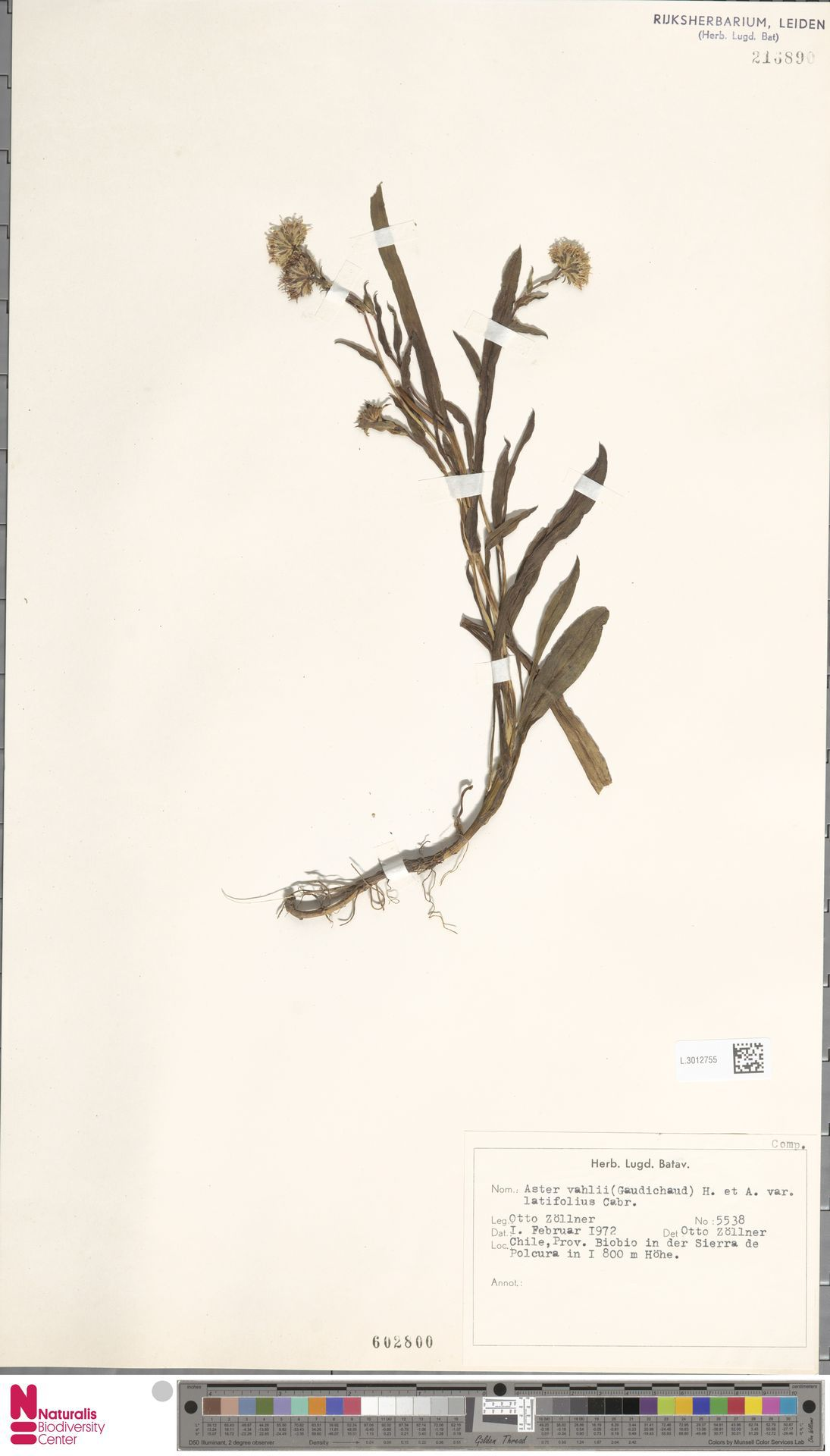
S. peteroanum herbarium specimen
