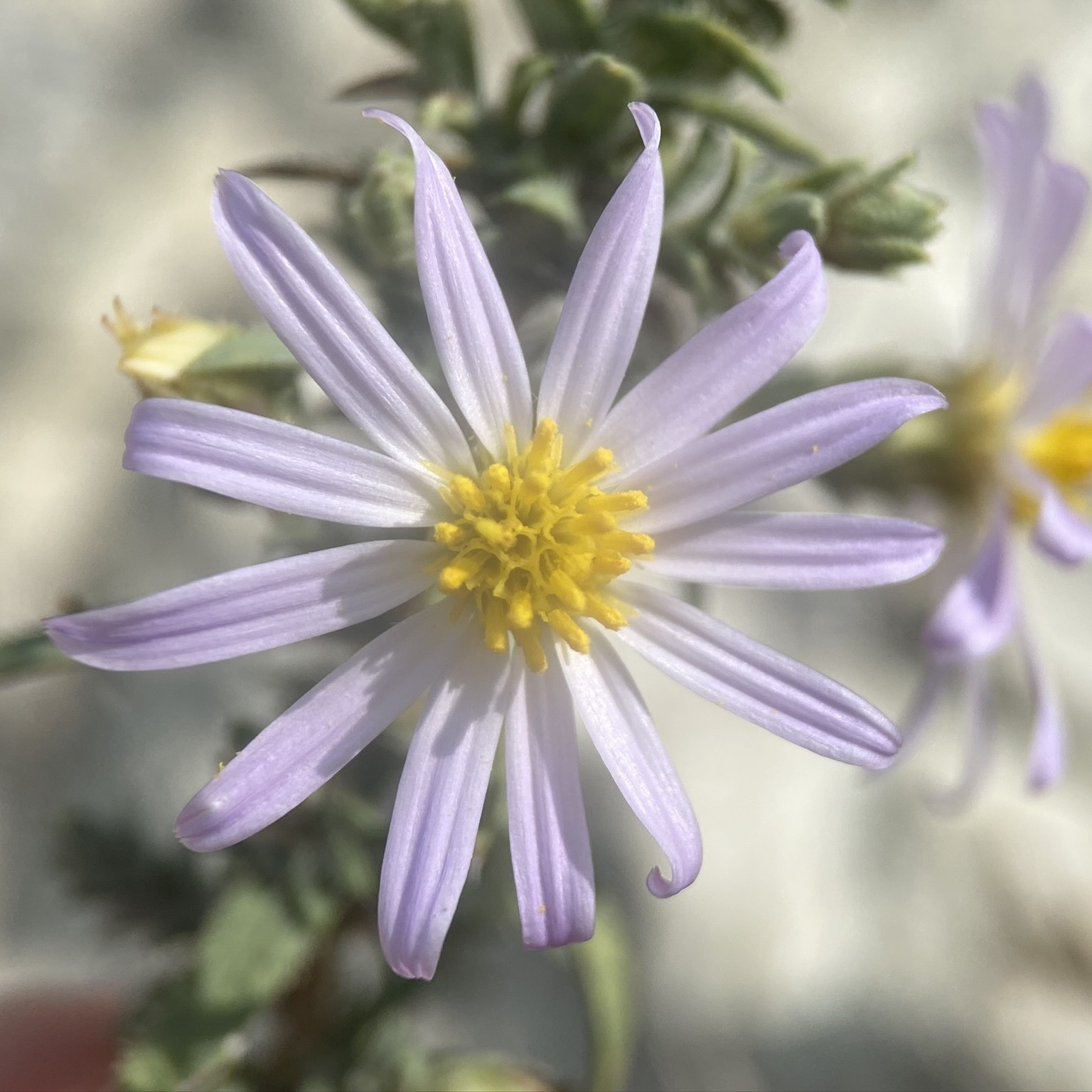

Conservation status
- Apparently Secure (NatureServe)

Scientific classification
- Kingdom: Plantae
- Clade: Tracheophytes
- Clade: Angiosperms
- Clade: Eudicots
- Clade: Asterids
- Order: Asterales
- Family: Asteraceae
- Tribe: Astereae
- Subtribe: Symphyotrichinae
- Genus: Symphyotrichum
- Subgenus: Symphyotrichum subg. Virgulus
- Section: Symphyotrichum sect. Grandiflori
- Species: S. fendleri

Binomial name
- Symphyotrichum fendleri (A.Gray) G.L.Nesom
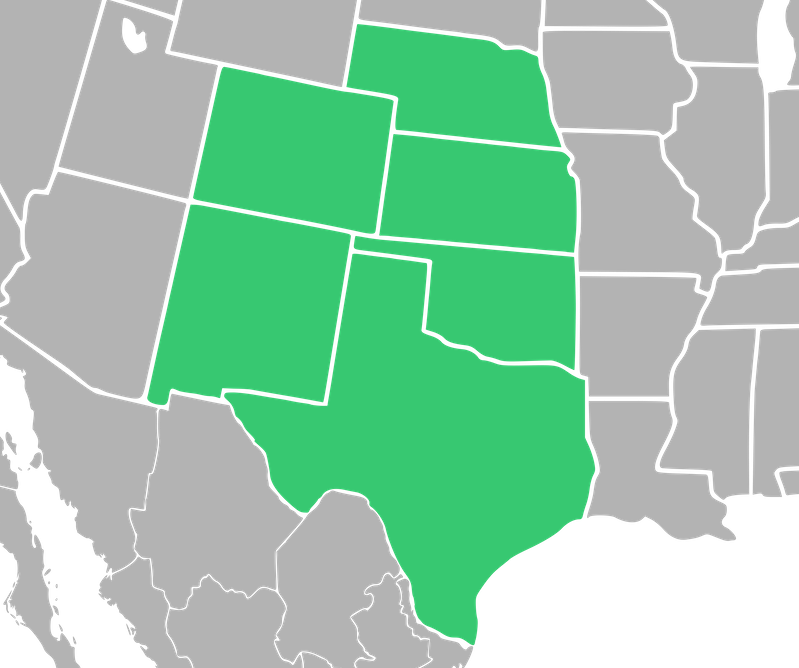
- Native distribution

Synonyms
- Aster fendleri A.Gray; Aster nuttallii var. fendleri (A.Gray) A.Gray; Virgulus fendleri (A.Gray) Reveal & Keener

= Symphyotrichum fendleri =

Species of plant in the aster family

Symphyotrichum fendleri (formerly Aster fendleri) is a species of flowering plant in the family Asteraceae native to the mid- and south-central United States, including Great Plains states and extending into Texas and New Mexico. Commonly known as Fendler's aster, it is a perennial, herbaceous plant that may reach 6 to 30 centimeters (2 to 12 inches) in height. Its flowers have lavender to purple ray florets and yellow then reddish purple disk florets.

== Gallery ==
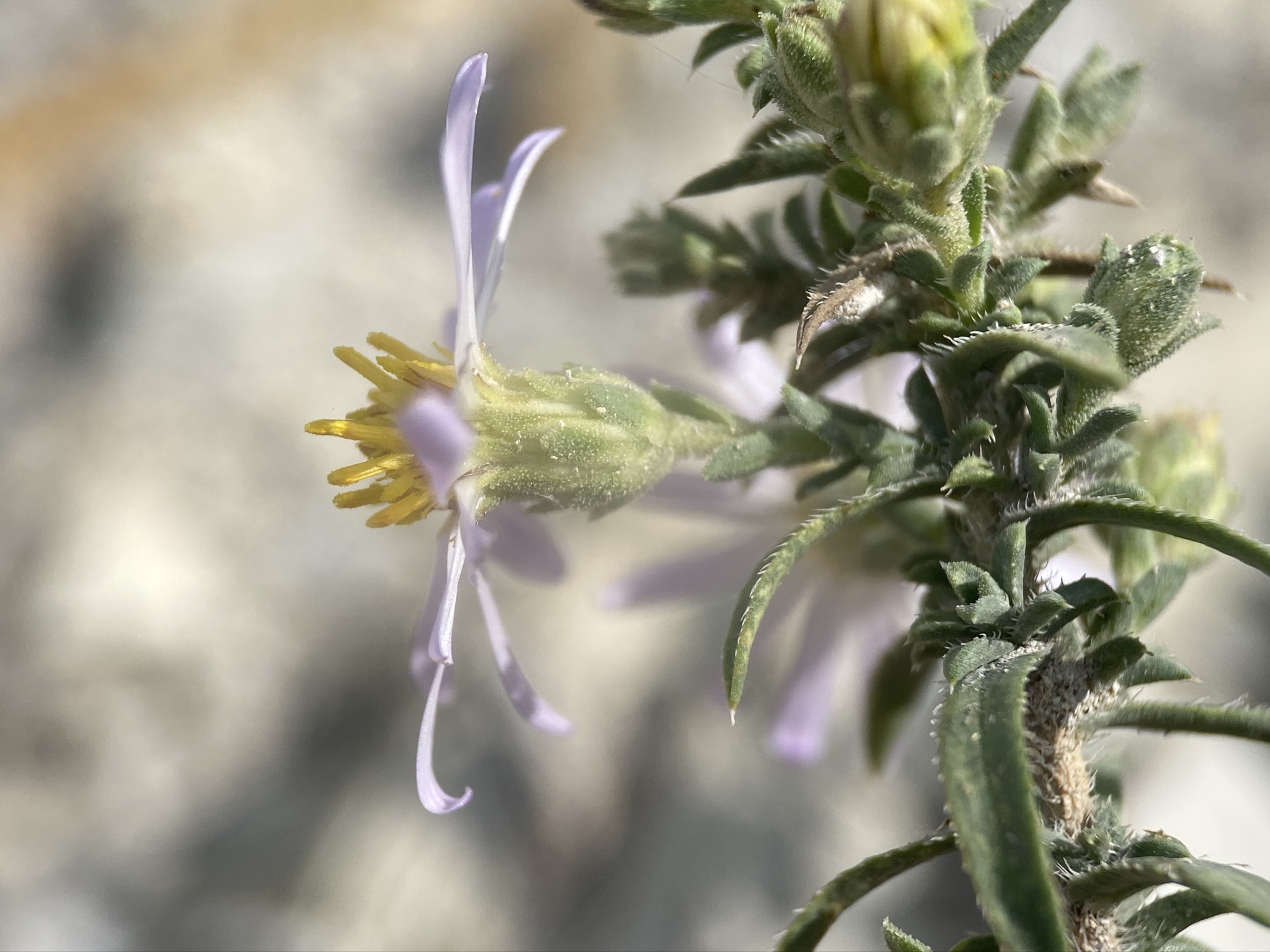

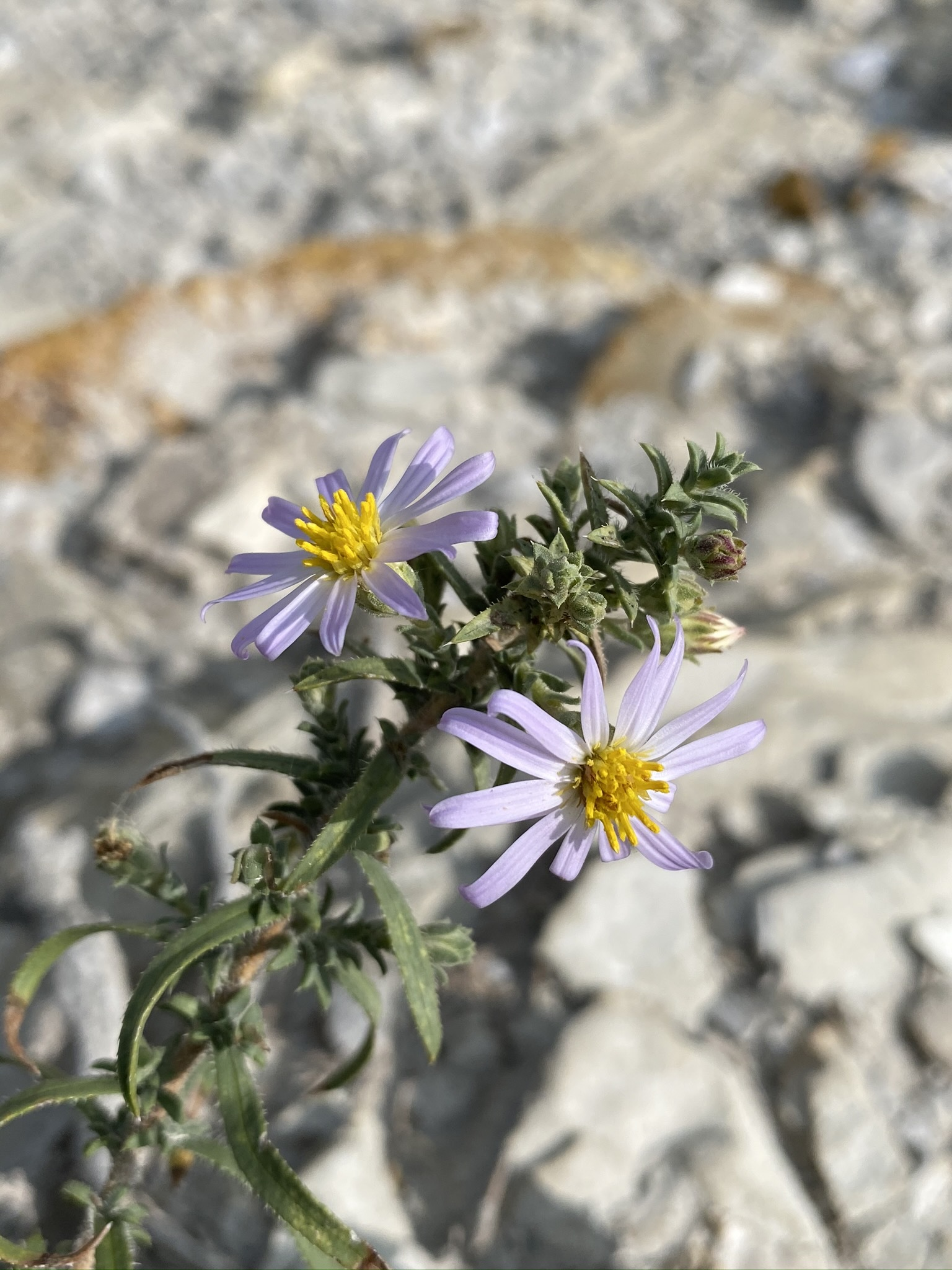

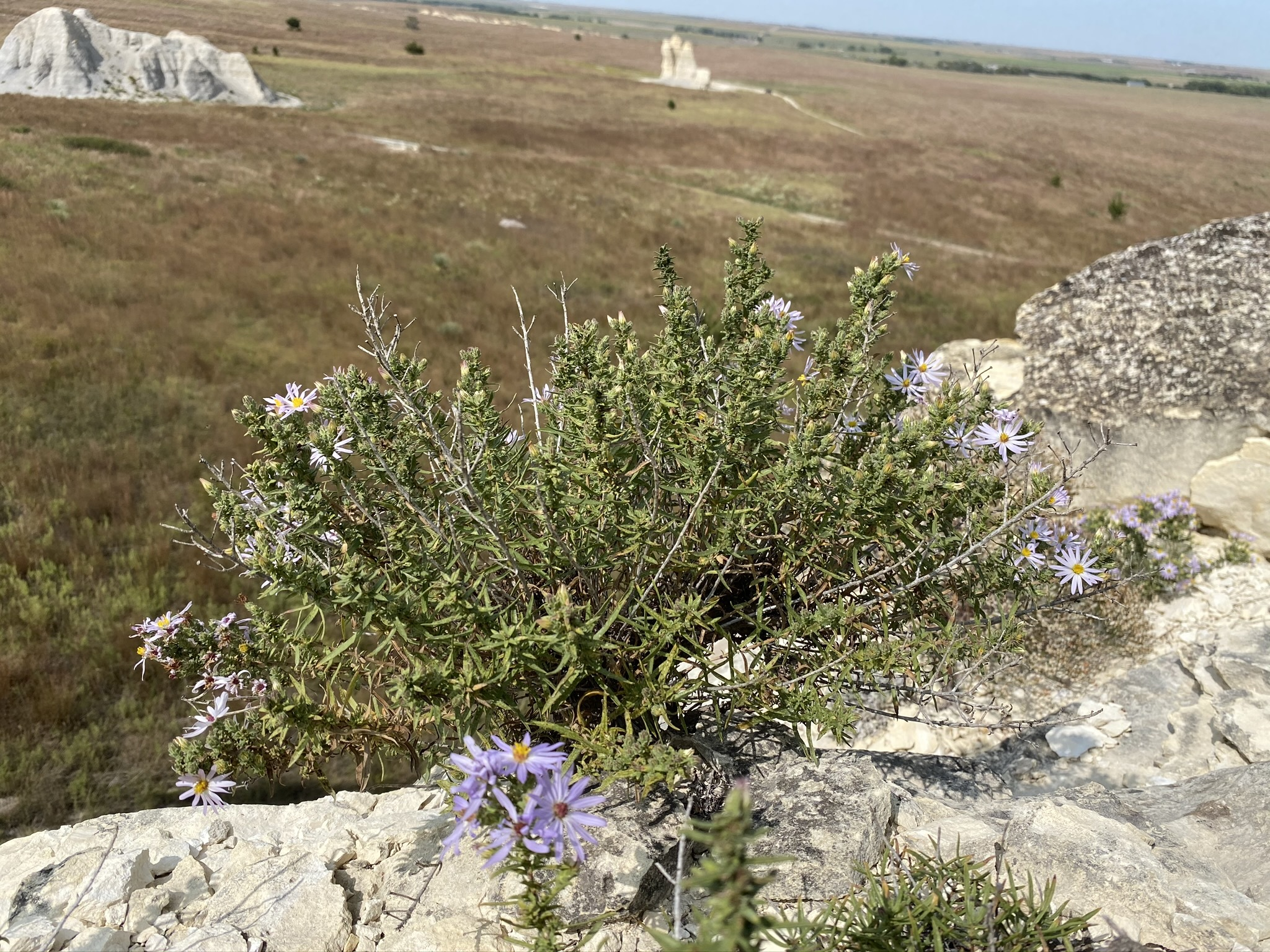
