= Symphyotrichum chihuahuense =

Scientific classification
- Kingdom: Plantae
- Clade: Tracheophytes
- Clade: Angiosperms
- Clade: Eudicots
- Clade: Asterids
- Order: Asterales
- Family: Asteraceae
- Tribe: Astereae
- Subtribe: Symphyotrichinae
- Genus: Symphyotrichum
- Subgenus: Symphyotrichum subg. Virgulus
- Section: Symphyotrichum sect. Grandiflori
- Species: S. chihuahuense

Binomial name
- Symphyotrichum chihuahuense G.L.Nesom
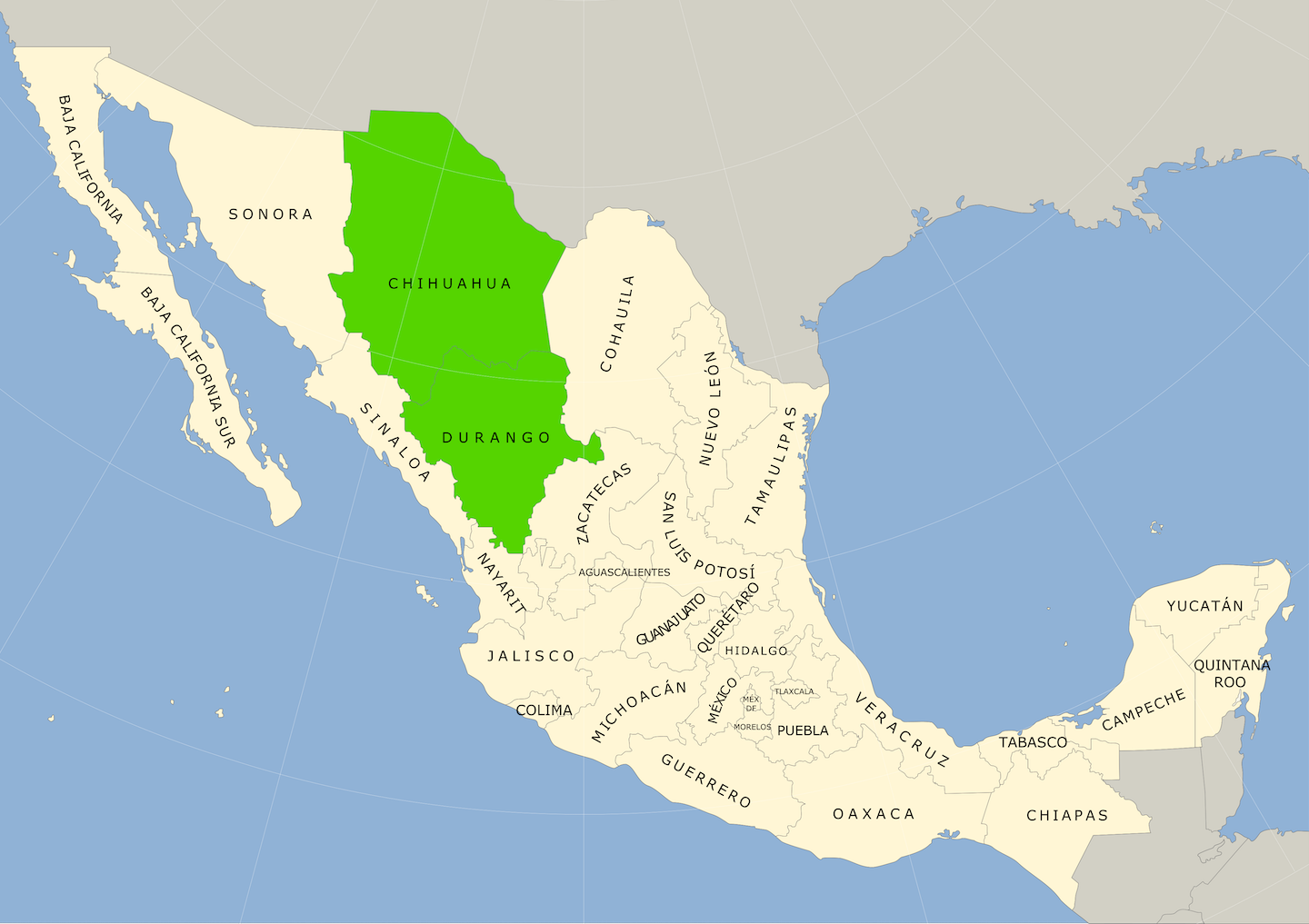
- Native distribution

Species of plant in the aster family

Symphyotrichum chihuahuense is a species of flowering plant in the family Asteraceae that is native to Chihuahua and Durango, Mexico. It is perennial and herbaceous and reaches heights of 20–35 centimeters (8–14 inches). Its white ray florets open June–September, and it grows in grasslands and oak–pine woods at elevations 1,800–2,500 meters (5,900–8,200 feet).
