= Symphyotrichum purpurascens =

Scientific classification
- Kingdom: Plantae
- Clade: Tracheophytes
- Clade: Angiosperms
- Clade: Eudicots
- Clade: Asterids
- Order: Asterales
- Family: Asteraceae
- Tribe: Astereae
- Subtribe: Symphyotrichinae
- Genus: Symphyotrichum
- Subgenus: Symphyotrichum subg. Virgulus
- Section: Symphyotrichum sect. Grandiflori
- Species: S. purpurascens

Binomial name
- Symphyotrichum purpurascens (Sch.Bip.) G.L.Nesom
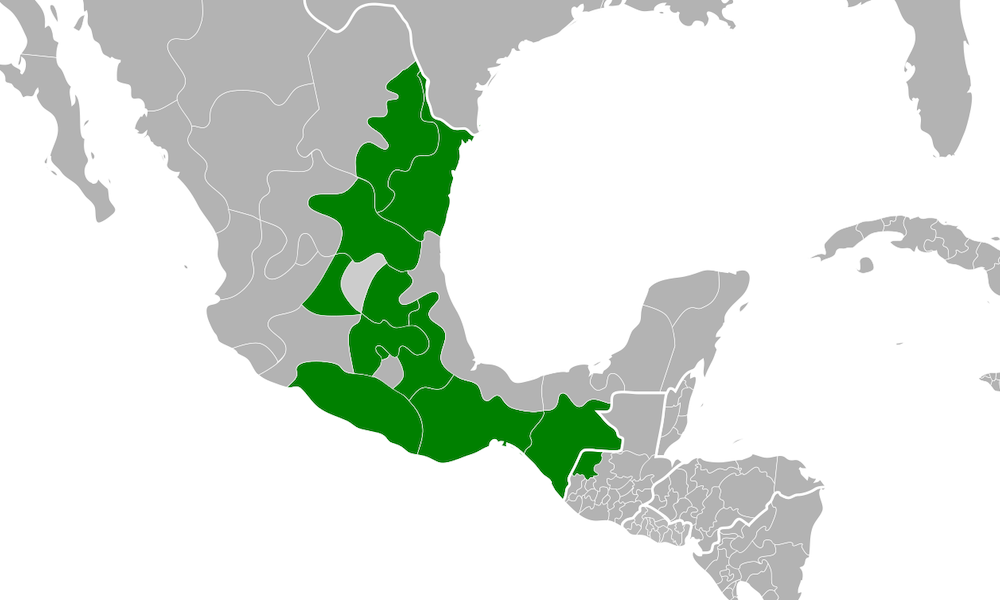
- Native distribution

Synonyms
- Aster purpurascens Sch.Bip.

Species of plant in the aster family

Symphyotrichum purpurascens (formerly Aster purpurascens) is a species of flowering plant in the family Asteraceae native to areas of Mexico and Guatemala.
