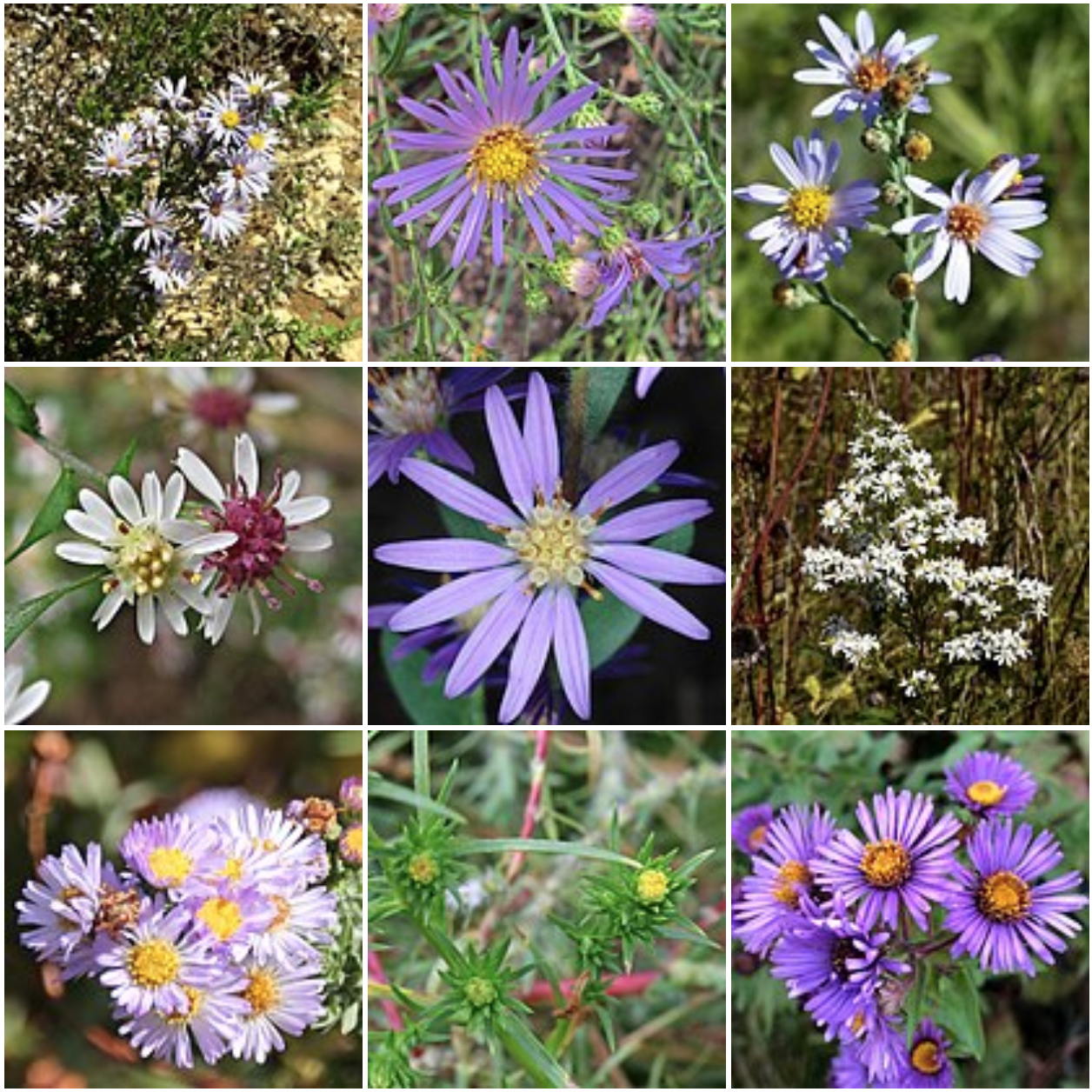
- Some Symphyotrichum species left–right, top–bottom are shown: S. carnerosanum, S. chilense, S. adnatum, S. lateriflorum, S. concolor, S. ericoides, S. defoliatum, S. ciliatum, S. novae-angliae.

Scientific classification
- Kingdom: Plantae
- Clade: Tracheophytes
- Clade: Angiosperms
- Clade: Eudicots
- Clade: Asterids
- Order: Asterales
- Family: Asteraceae
- Subfamily: Asteroideae
- Tribe: Astereae
- Subtribe: Symphyotrichinae
- Genus: Symphyotrichum; Nees

= List of Symphyotrichum species =

Symphyotrichum genus

List of plant species in the aster family

Symphyotrichum is a genus of flowering plants in the tribe Astereae which includes the commonly cultivated New York aster (S. novi-belgii) and New England aster (S. novae-angliae). Its species are widespread in the Americas, including as far north as subarctic North America to as far south as Chile, Argentina, and the Falkland Islands. One species has a native range extending into eastern Eurasia.

Most of the species in the genus are perennials. The flower heads have white, pink, purple, or blue ray florets surrounding white to yellow disk florets. The disk floret corollas become pink, purple, or brown after pollination. The three species in section Conyzopsis have reduced or absent ray florets.

Symphyotrichum is the type genus of subtribe Symphyotrichinae. There are 98 species in the genus, some with varieties, and thirteen named hybrids. The genus is split into five subgenera: Chapmaniana, Astropolium, Virgulus, Ascendentes, and Symphyotrichum. Most of the species had been classified within the genus Aster until it was confirmed to be polyphyletic. The American asters now are separated into monophyletic genera based on multiple phylogenetic studies.

== Conventions ==
NatureServe conservation categories
- NatureServe conservation categories
  Conservation status
  - GX: Presumed Extinct (0 species)
  - GH: Possibly Extinct (0 species)
  - G1: Critically Imperiled (3 species)
  - G2: Imperiled (9 species)
  - G3: Vulnerable (7 species)
  - G4: Apparently Secure (21 species)
  - G5: Secure (37 species)
  Other categories
  - GNA: Not Applicable (8 species)
  - GNR: Not Ranked (0 species)
  - NL: Not listed (25 species)

Conservation status codes follow the NatureServe conservation (NS) rounded global status scheme. Hybrids have a column for parents in place of conservation status. Not listed (NL) is not a NatureServe category but is used here to represent those left out of global status rankings up to G5 (including GNA and GNR) and those not in NatureServe. Type species for each clade are in a separate table.

Legend
Scientific name and picture	Author citation	Basionym	Year	Common name(s) [and varieties]	NS	Habitat	Distribution
Abbreviated scientific name, link to species article, (Note: Hybrids do not have their own articles.) and picture, if available	Author citation	Basionym	Year of the original species description	Common name(s) and varieties, if applicable	NatureServe rounded global conservation status	Habitat	Distribution map

== Classification ==
=== Classification of Symphyotrichum ===
Subtribe Symphyotrichinae contains six genera. In addition to Symphyotrichum, these are Almutaster, Ampelaster, Canadanthus, Psilactis, and Sanrobertia, with Symphyotrichum being the largest at 98 species and thirteen named hybrids. The cladogram presented here for the subtribe is based on a combination of cytotaxonomic and morphologic data reported in multiple studies. Symphyotrichum is the type genus of the subtribe.

- Astereae
  - Symphyotrichinae
    - Canadanthus
    - - Ampelaster
      - - Sanrobertia
        - - - Almutaster
            - Psilactis
          - Symphyotrichum
  - (other subtribes)

Cladogram references

=== Classification within Symphyotrichum ===
Most of the species had been classified within the genus Aster until it was confirmed to be polyphyletic – as previously defined, the genus Aster contained groups of species with different most recent ancestors. The American asters were then separated into several genera based on morphological characteristics and phylogenetic studies.

Within Symphyotrichum, S. novae-angliae and S. turbinellum are monotypic within sections. S. novae-angliae is classified in the subgenus Virgulus. In 1994, it was placed in section Grandiflori, subsection Polyligulae. In 2002, it was segregated within its own section Polyliguli. The list follows the 2002 circumscription of section Polyliguli for the species. S. turbinellum is classified in the subgenus Symphyotrichum. It has been placed within its own section Turbinelli. It was previously placed in section Symphyotrichum, subsection Turbinelli. The list follows the more recent circumscription of section Turbinelli for the species.

Clades

- Symphyotrichum subg. Chapmaniana (Semple) Semple
- Symphyotrichum subg. Astropolium (Nutt.) Semple
- Symphyotrichum subg. Virgulus (Raf.) G.L.Nesom
  - sect. Ericoidei (Torr. & A.Gray) G.L.Nesom
  - sect. Patentes (Torr. & A.Gray) G.L.Nesom
    - subsect. Brachyphylli (Torr. & A.Gray) G.L.Nesom
    - subsect. Patentes
  - sect. Grandiflori (Torr. & A.Gray) G.L.Nesom
    - subsect. Mexicanae G.L.Nesom
    - subsect. Grandiflori (Torr. & A.Gray) G.L.Nesom
  - sect. Polyliguli (Semple & Brouillet) Semple
  - sect. Concolores (Torr. & A.Gray) G.L.Nesom
- Symphyotrichum subg. Ascendentes (Rydb.) Semple
- Symphyotrichum subg. Symphyotrichum
  - sect. Conyzopsis (Torr. & A.Gray) G.L.Nesom
  - sect. Occidentales (Rydb.) G.L.Nesom
  - sect. Turbinelli (Rydb.) Semple
  - sect. Symphyotrichum
    - subsect. Dumosi (Torr. & A.Gray) G.L.Nesom
    - subsect. Heterophylli (Nees) Semple
      - series Concinni (Nees) Semple
      - series Cordifolii (G.Don in Loudon) Semple
    - subsect. Porteriani (Rydb.) G.L.Nesom
    - subsect. Symphyotrichum
      - series Punicei (House) Semple
      - series Symphyotrichum

Type species
Clade	Type species	Source
Genus Symphyotrichum	S. novi-belgii	
Subgenus Chapmaniana	S. chapmanii	
Subgenus Astropolium	S. tenuifolium	
Subgenus Virgulus	S. concolor	
Section Ericoidei	S. ericoides	
Section Patentes	S. patens	
Subsection Brachyphylli	S. walteri	
Subsection Patentes	S. patens	
Section Grandiflori	S. grandiflorum	
Subsection Mexicanae	S. moranense	
Subsection Grandiflori	S. grandiflorum	
Section Polyliguli	S. novae-angliae	
Section Concolores	S. concolor	
Subgenus Ascendentes	S. ascendens	
Subgenus Symphyotrichum	S. novi-belgii	
Section Conyzopsis	S. ciliatum	
Section Occidentales	S. spathulatum	
Section Turbinelli	S. turbinellum	
Section Symphyotrichum	S. novi-belgii	
Subsection Dumosi	S. dumosum	
Subsection Heterophylli	S. cordifolium	
Series Concinni	S. laeve	
Series Cordifolii	S. cordifolium	
Subsection Porteriani	S. porteri	
Subsection Symphyotrichum	S. novi-belgii	
Series Punicei	S. puniceum	
Series Symphyotrichum	S. novi-belgii	

Species classifications
- - Symphyotrichum
    - subg. Chapmaniana
      S. chapmanii
    - subg. Astropolium
      - S. divaricatum
      - S. glabrifolium
      - S. graminifolium
      - S. martii
      - S. parviflorum
      - S. patagonicum
      - S. peteroanum
      - S. potosinum
      - S. regnellii
      - S. subulatum
      - S. tenuifolium
      - S. vahlii
    - subg. Virgulus
      - sect. Ericoidei
        - S. ericoides
        - S. falcatum
      - sect. Patentes
        - ssect. Brachyphylli
          - S. adnatum
          - S. walteri
        - ssect. Patentes
          - S. georgianum
          - S. patens
          - S. phlogifolium
      - sect. Grandiflori
        - ssect. Mexicanae
          - S. bimater
          - S. chihuahuense
          - S. hintonii
          - S. moranense
          - S. purpurascens
          - S. trilineatum
          - S. turneri
        - ssect. Grandiflori
          - S. campestre
          - S. estesii
          - S. fendleri
          - S. fontinale
          - S. grandiflorum
          - S. oblongifolium
          - S. pygmaeum
          - S. yukonense
      - sect. Polyliguli
        S. novae-angliae
      - sect. Concolores
        - S. concolor
        - S. lucayanum
        - S. plumosum
        - S. pratense
        - S. sericeum
    - subg. Ascendentes (Note: Sugbenus Ascendentes is made up of two allopolyploid species with historic parents from subg. Virgulus and subg. Symphyotrichum.)
      - S. ascendens
      - S. defoliatum
    - subg. Symphyotrichum
      - sect. Conyzopsis
        - S. ciliatum
        - S. frondosum
        - S. laurentianum
      - sect. Occidentales
        - S. chilense
        - S. eatonii
        - S. foliaceum
        - S. greatae
        - S. hallii
        - S. hendersonii
        - S. jessicae
        - S. lentum
        - S. molle
        - S. spathulatum
        - S. subspicatum
      - sect. Turbinelli
        S. turbinellum
      - sect. Symphyotrichum
        - ssect. Dumosi
          - S. boreale
          - S. bullatum
          - S. burgessii
          - S. carnerosanum
          - S. dumosum
          - S. eulae
          - S. lanceolatum
          - S. lateriflorum
          - S. leone
          - S. nahanniense
          - S. ontarionis
          - S. praealtum
          - S. racemosum
          - S. schaffneri
          - S. simmondsii
          - S. tradescantii
          - S. welshii
        - ssect. Heterophylli
          - ser. Concinni
            - S. laeve
            - S. oolentangiense
          - ser. Cordifolii
            - S. anomalum
            - S. ciliolatum
            - S. cordifolium
            - S. drummondii
            - S. shortii
            - S. undulatum
            - S. urophyllum
        - ssect. Porteriani
          - S. depauperatum
          - S. kentuckiense
          - S. parviceps
          - S. pilosum
          - S. porteri
        - ssect. Symphyotrichum
          - ser. Punicei
            - S. elliottii
            - S. firmum
            - S. prenanthoides
            - S. puniceum
            - S. rhiannon
          - ser. Symphyotrichum
            - S. anticostense
            - S. novi-belgii
            - S. retroflexum
            - S. robynsianum
  Cladogram references

== Species list ==
=== Subgenus Chapmaniana ===
Subgenus Chapmaniana (Semple) Semple – one species
Scientific name and picture	Author citation	Basionym	Year	Common name(s)	NS	Habitat	Distribution
S. chapmanii	(Torr. & A.Gray); Semple & Brouillet	Aster chapmanii	1841	Savanna aster	G2	Wetlands, bogs, acid swamps 0–30 m (0–100 ft)	Map of Alabama and Florida with counties of distribution of Symphyotrichum chapmanii shaded in green: Primarily the Apalachicola River drainage basin. Alabama counties — Geneva and Houston; Florida counties — Alachua, Bay, Calhoun, Franklin, Gulf, Jackson, Liberty, Okaloosa, Santa Rosa, St. Lucie, Wakulla, Walton, and Washington.

=== Subgenus Astropolium ===
Subgenus Astropolium (Nutt.) Semple – twelve species
Scientific name and picture	Author citation	Basionym	Year	Common name(s) and varieties	NS	Habitat	Distribution
S. divaricatum	(Nutt.); G.L.Nesom	Tripolium divaricatum	1840	Southern annual saltmarsh aster	G5	Marshy habitats, roadsides, lawns, and waste places 0–1,500 m (0–4,921 ft)	Symphyotrichum divaricatum native distribution: Mexico — Baja California Sur, Chihuahua, Coahuila, and Tamaulipas; US — Alabama, Arkansas, Kansas, Louisiana, Mississippi, Nebraska, New Mexico, Oklahoma, Tennessee, Texas, and Virginia.
S. glabrifolium	(DC.); G.L.Nesom	Erigeron glabrifolius	1836		NL	Wet meadows and stream edges 1,500–2,400 m (4,920–7,870 ft)	Symphyotrichum glabrifolium native distribution map: Argentine provinces — Mendoza, Neuquén, Río Negro, and Santa Cruz; and central and south Chile.
S. graminifolium	(Spreng.); G.L.Nesom	Conyza graminifolia	1826		NL	Humid places	Symphyotrichum graminifolium distribution map: Argentina, Bolivia, Brazil, Paraguay, and Uruguay.
S. martii	(Baker); G.L.Nesom	Aster martii	1882		NL	Cerrado savanna, grasslands	Symphyotrichum martii distribution map: Brazil — Minas Gerais.
S. parviflorum	(Nees); G.L.Nesom	Aster parviflorus	1818	Southwestern annual saltmarsh aster	NL	Marshy habitats and roadsides 0–1,100 m (0–3,609 ft)	Symphyotrichum parviflorum native distribution: USA (Alabama, Arizona, California, Florida, Nevada, New Mexico, Oklahoma, Texas, Utah); Costa Rica; Belize; Cuba; Ecuador; Mexico (Aguascalientes, Baja California Norte, Baja California Sur, Campeche, Chiapas, Chihuahua, Coahuila, Colima, Ciudad de Mexico, Durango, Guanajuato, Guerrero, Hidalgo, Jalisco, México State, Michoacan, Morelos, Nayarit, Nuevo León, Oaxaca, Puebla, Querétaro, Quintana Roo, San Luis Potosí, Sinaloa, Sonora, Tabasco, Tamaulipas, Tlaxcala, Veracruz, Yucatán, Zacatecas); Belize; Nicaragua; Haiti; Dominican Republic.
S. patagonicum	(Cabrera); G.L.Nesom	Aster patagonicus	1971		NL	Mallines and lagoon edges 500–2,500 m (1,640–8,200 ft)	Symphyotrichum patagonicum distribution map: Argentine provinces – Chubut, Mendoza, Neuquén, and Santa Cruz.
S. peteroanum	(Phil.); G.L.Nesom	Aster peteroanus	1894		NL	Humid montane ecosystems 1,000–2,200 m (3,280–7,220 ft)	Symphyotrichum peteroanum native distribution: Subantarctic mountains of Argentina and Chile.
S. potosinum	(A.Gray); G.L.Nesom	Aster potosinus	1880	Santa Rita Mountain aster	G2	Muddy and wet soils on stream banks 1,500–1,900 m (4,920–6,230 ft)	Symphyotrichum potosinum distribution map: Huachuca Mountains in Cochise County, Arizona; Mexican states of Aguascalientes, Chihuahua, Durango, Guanajuato, Guerrero, Hidalgo, Jalisco, México, Michoacan, Oaxaca, Puebla, San Luis Potosí, Sonora, Veracruz, and Zacatecas.
S. regnellii	(Baker); G.L.Nesom	Aster regnellii	1882		NL	Swamps or damp savanna soils	Symphyotrichum regnellii distribution map: Argentine provinces — Corrientes and Misiones; west-central, southeast, and south Brazil.
S. subulatum	(Michx.); G.L.Nesom	Aster subulatus	1803	Annual saltmarsh aster; Eastern annual saltmarsh aster; Three varieties: S. s. var. subulatum; S. s. var. elongatum (Bahaman aster); S. s. var. squamatum (southeastern annual saltmarsh aster)	G5	Brackish marshes, salt marshes, roadsides 0–4,000 m (0–13,120 ft)	Symphyotrichum subulatum distribution map: Argentina; Bahamas; Belize; Bolivia; Brazil; Canada — New Brunswick and Ontario; Chile; Colombia; Costa Rica; Cuba; Dominican Republic; Ecuador; Guatemala; Haiti; Honduras; Jamaica; Mexico; Nicaragua; Paraguay; Peru; Uruguay; US — Alabama, Arizona, Arkansas, California, Connecticut, Delaware, Florida, Georgia, Illinois, Indiana, Kansas, Louisiana, Maine, Maryland, Massachusetts, Michigan, Mississippi, Nebraska, Nevada, New Hampshire, New Jersey, New Mexico, New York, North Carolina, Ohio, Oklahoma, Pennsylvania, Rhode Island, South Carolina, Tennessee, Texas, Utah, and Virginia; and, Venezuela. Also introduced worldwide.
S. tenuifolium	(L.); G.L.Nesom	Aster tenuifolius	1753	Perennial saltmarsh aster Two varieties: S. t. var. tenuifolium; S. t. var. aphyllum (Brace’s aster)	G5	Coastal salt marshes, brackish marshes, low pine woods 0–10 m (0–30 ft)	Symphyotrichum tenuifolium distribution map: Bahamas, Cuba, and US (Alabama, Connecticut, Delaware, Florida, Georgia, Louisiana, Maine, Maryland, Massachusetts, Mississippi, New Hampshire, New Jersey, New York, North Carolina, Rhode Island, South Carolina, Texas, and Virginia).
S. vahlii	(Gaudich.); G.L.Nesom	Erigeron vahlii	1825	Margarita; Marsh daisy; Two varieties: S. v. var. vahlii; S. v. var. tenuifolium	NL	Grassland, heathland, peaty soil, sandy soil 20–1,200 m (70–3,940 ft)	Symphyotrichum vahlii distribution map: South Argentina, Bolivia, central and south Chile, and Falkland Islands (UK).

=== Subgenus Virgulus ===
Subgenus Virgulus (Raf.) G.L.Nesom

==== Section Ericoidei ====
Section Ericoidei (Torr. & A.Gray) G.L.Nesom – two species
Scientific name and picture	Author citation	Basionym	Year	Common name(s) and varieties	NS	Habitat	Distribution
S. ericoides	(L.); G.L.Nesom	Aster ericoides	1753	White heath aster Two varieties: S. e. var. ericoides; S. e. var. pansum	G5	Open locations with sandy, gravelly, or disturbed soil 30–2,400 m (100–7,870 ft)	Symphyotrichum ericoides distribution map: Canada — Alberta, British Columbia, Manitoba, Northwest Territories, Ontario, Québec, and Saskatchewan; Mexico — Coahuila and Nuevo León; US — Arizona, Arkansas, Colorado, Connecticut, Delaware, District of Columbia, Idaho, Illinois, Indiana, Iowa, Kansas, Maine, Maryland, Massachusetts, Michigan, Minnesota, Mississippi, Missouri, Montana, Nebraska, New Jersey, New Mexico, New York, North Dakota, Ohio, Oklahoma, Oregon, Pennsylvania, Rhode Island, South Dakota, Texas, Utah, Vermont, Virginia, Washington, West Virginia, Wisconsin, and Wyoming.
S. falcatum	(Lindl.); G.L.Nesom	Aster falcatus	1834	Western heath aster; White prairie aster; Two varieties: S. f. var. falcatum; S. f. var. commutatum	G5	Well-drained soils, stream banks and slopes, and others 200–2,500 m (660–8,200 ft)	Symphyotrichum falcatum distribution map: Canada — Alberta, British Columbia, Manitoba, Northwest Territories, Ontario, Saskatchewan, and Yukon; Mexico — Chihuahua, Coahuila, Durango, Jalisco, Nuevo León, and Sonora; US — Alaska, Arizona, Colorado, Idaho, Illinois, Iowa, Kansas, Minnesota, Missouri, Montana, Nebraska, New Mexico, North Dakota, Oklahoma, South Dakota, Texas, Utah, Wisconsin, and Wyoming.

==== Section Patentes ====
Section Patentes (Torr. & A.Gray) G.L.Nesom

===== Subsection Brachyphylli =====
Subsection Brachyphylli (Torr. & A.Gray) G.L.Nesom – two species
Scientific name and picture	Author citation	Basionym	Year	Common name(s)	NS	Habitat	Distribution
S. adnatum	(Nutt.); G.L.Nesom	Aster adnatus	1834	Scaleleaf aster	G4	Sandy soils, scrub, woods 0–100 m (0–330 ft)	Symphyotrichum adnatum distribution map: Bahamas and US (Alabama, Florida, Georgia, Louisiana, and Mississippi).
S. walteri	(Alexander); G.L.Nesom	Aster walteri	1933	Walter's aster	G4	Sandy and clay soils, woods edges, open areas 0–100 m (0–330 ft)	Symphyotrichum walteri distribution map: US — Florida, Georgia, North Carolina, and South Carolina.

===== Subsection Patentes =====
Subsection Patentes – three species
Scientific name and picture	Author citation	Basionym	Year	Common name(s) and varieties	NS	Habitat	Distribution
S. georgianum	(Alexander); G.L.Nesom	Aster georgianus	1933	Georgia aster	G3	Sandy or clay soil, woodlands, mostly Piedmont; 0–300 m (0–980 ft)	Symphyotrichum georgianum distribution map: US — Alabama, Florida, Georgia, North Carolina, and South Carolina.
S. patens	(Aiton); G.L.Nesom	Aster patens	1789	Late purple aster; Spreading aster; Three varieties: S. p. var. patens; S. p. var. gracile; S. p. var. patentissimum	G5	Dry woodlands, sandy or clay soils, fields 0–1,000 m (0–3,280 ft)	Symphyotrichum patens distribution map: US — Alabama, Arkansas, Connecticut, Delaware, District of Columbia, Florida, Georgia, Illinois, Indiana, Kansas, Kentucky, Louisiana, Maine, Maryland, Massachusetts, Mississippi, Missouri, New Hampshire, New Jersey, New York, North Carolina, Ohio, Oklahoma, Pennsylvania, Rhode Island, South Carolina, Tennessee, Texas, Virginia, and West Virginia.
S. phlogifolium	(Muhl. ex Willd.); G.L.Nesom	Aster phlogifolius	1803	Thinleaf late purple aster	G5	Various soils, rich mesic hardwood forests 0–1,100 m (0–3,610 ft)	Symphyotrichum phlogifolium distribution map: US — Alabama, Connecticut, Delaware, District of Columbia, Georgia, Indiana, Kentucky, Maryland, Massachusetts, New York, North Carolina, Ohio, Pennsylvania, Rhode Island, South Carolina, Tennessee, Virginia, and West Virginia.

==== Section Grandiflori ====
Section Grandiflori (Torr. & A.Gray) G.L.Nesom

===== Subsection Mexicanae =====
Subsection Mexicanae G.L.Nesom – seven species
Scientific name and picture	Author citation	Basionym	Year	Common name(s)	NS	Habitat	Distribution
S. bimater	(Standl. & Steyerm.); G.L.Nesom	Aster bimater	1944		NL	Pine-oak woods, ravines, slopes, grassy openings 1,000–2,150 m (3,280–7,050 ft)	Symphyotrichum bimater distribution map: Guatemala; Mexico — Chiapas and Oaxaca.
S. chihuahuense	G.L.Nesom		2018		NL	Grassland, oak-pine woods 1,800–2,500 m (5,910–8,200 ft)	Symphyotrichum chihuahuense distribution map: Chihuahua and Durango (Mexico).
S. hintonii	(G.L.Nesom); G.L.Nesom	Aster hintonii	1989		NL	Oak and oak-pine woods 1,400–2,200 m (4,590–7,220 ft)	Symphyotrichum hintonii distribution map: Mexico — Guerrero.
S. moranense	(Kunth); G.L.Nesom	Aster moranensis	1818		NL	Grassland, woodlands 1,000–2,750 m (3,280–9,020 ft)	Symphyotrichum moranense distribution map: Mexico — Aguascalientes, Chihuahua, Distrito Federal, Durango, Guanajuato, Guerrero, Hidalgo, Jalisco, México, Michoacán, Morelos, Nayarit, Oaxaca, Puebla, Querétaro, San Luis Potosí, Sinaloa, Tlaxcala, Veracruz, and Zacatecas.
S. purpurascens	(Sch.Bip.); G.L.Nesom	Aster purpurascens	1854		NL	Open woods 1,500–2,850 m (4,920–9,350 ft)	Symphyotrichum purpurascens distribution map: Guatemala — Huehuetenango Department; Mexico — Chiapas, Distrito Federal, Guanajuato, Guerrero, Hidalgo, México, Nuevo León, Oaxaca, Puebla, San Luis Potosí, Tamaulipas, and Tlaxcala.
S. trilineatum	(Sch.Bip. ex Klatt); G.L.Nesom	Aster trilineatus	1884		NL	Mountains (sierra); 975–2,840 m (3,200–9,320 ft)	Symphyotrichum trilineatum distribution map: Guatemala — Huehuetenango Department and Totonicapán Department; Mexico — Chiapas, Chihuahua, Distrito Federal, Durango, Guanajuato, Guerrero, Hidalgo, México, Michoacán, Nuevo León, Oaxaca, Puebla, San Luis Potosí, Tamaulipas, Tlaxcala, and Veracruz.
S. turneri	(S.D.Sundb. & A.G.Jones); G.L.Nesom	Aster moranensis var. turneri	1986		NL	Woods, along waterways, and in wet pastures 2,050–2,750 m (6,730–9,020 ft)	Symphyotrichum turneri distribution map: Mexico — Durango.

===== Subsection Grandiflori =====
Subsection Grandiflori (Torr. & A.Gray) G.L.Nesom – eight species
Scientific name and picture	Author citation	Basionym	Year	Common name(s)	NS	Habitat	Distribution
S. campestre	(Nutt.); G.L.Nesom	Aster campestris	1840	Western meadow aster	G5	Dry habitats, rocky and sandy soils near ponds and streams 1,500–2,500 m (4,920–8,200 ft)	Symphyotrichum campestre distribution map: Canada — Alberta and British Columbia; US — California, Colorado, Idaho, Montana, Nevada, Oregon, Washington, and Wyoming
S. estesii	Semple		2019	May Prairie aster; Estes's aster	G1	Hydroxeric soils in open, sunny, flat prairies Approx. 330 m (1,070 ft) (Note: Elevation in the May Prairie State Natural Area)	May Prairie State; Natural Area; Coffee County, Tennessee (US)
S. fendleri	(A.Gray); G.L.Nesom	Aster fendleri	1849	Fendler's aster	G4	Open, sandy, silty, shaly, often rocky soils and similar 600–2,000 m (1,970–6,560 ft)	Symphyotrichum fendleri distribution map: US — Colorado, Kansas, Nebraska, New Mexico, Oklahoma, and Texas
S. fontinale	(Alexander); G.L.Nesom	Aster fontinalis	1933	Florida water aster	G3	Marshes, sandhills, hammocks, flood plains, streams 0–50 m (0–160 ft)	Map of Georgia and Florida with county boundaries and distribution of Symphyotrichum fontinale shaded in green: Georgia counties — Grady; Florida counties — Alachua, Citrus, Collier, Dixie, Lee, Liberty, Marion, Miami-Dade, Monroe, Pasco, and Taylor
S. grandiflorum	(L.); G.L.Nesom	Aster grandiflorus	1753	Large-flowered aster	G4	Sandy soils and hills, thickets, roadsides 0–200 m (0–660 ft) and higher	Symphyotrichum grandiflorum distribution map: North Carolina, South Carolina, and Virginia (US)
S. oblongifolium	(Nutt.); G.L.Nesom	Aster oblongifolius	1818	Aromatic aster; Oblong-leaved aster	G5	Open and dry, rocky or sandy soils 100–1,500 m (330–4,920 ft)	Symphyotrichum oblongifolium distribution map: Mexico — Coahuila; US — Alabama, Arkansas, Colorado, Illinois, Indiana, Iowa, Kansas, Kentucky, Maryland, Minnesota, Mississippi, Missouri, Montana, Nebraska, New Mexico, North Carolina, North Dakota, Ohio, Oklahoma, Pennsylvania, South Dakota, Tennessee, Texas, Virginia, West Virginia, Wisconsin, and Wyoming
S. pygmaeum	(Lindl.); Brouillet & Selliah	Aster pygmaeus	1834	Pygmy aster	G4	Sandy or silty wet areas, gravelly tundra, tundra slopes 0–200 m (0–660 ft)	Symphyotrichum pygmaeum distribution map: areas of Alaska, Northwest Territories, and Nunavut
S. yukonense	(Cronquist); G.L.Nesom	Aster yukonensis	1945	Yukon aster	G3	Mud flats, rocky or silty lakeshores 300–1,500 m (980–4,920 ft)	Symphyotrichum yukonense distribution map: areas of Alaska, Yukon, and Northwest Territories

==== Section Polyliguli ====
Section Polyliguli (Semple & Brouillet) Semple – one species
Scientific name and picture	Author citation	Basionym	Year	Common name(s)	NS	Habitat	Distribution
S. novae-angliae	(L.); G.L.Nesom	Aster novae-angliae	1753	New England aster	G5	Open, typically moist habitats 0–1,600 m (0–5,250 ft)	Symphyotrichum novae-angliae range map: Native distribution in green: Canada — Manitoba, New Brunswick, Nova Scotia, Ontario, and Québec; US — Alabama, Arkansas, Colorado, Connecticut, Delaware, District of Columbia, Georgia, Illinois, Indiana, Iowa, Kansas, Kentucky, Maine, Maryland, Massachusetts, Michigan, Minnesota, Mississippi, Missouri, Nebraska, New Hampshire, New Jersey, New Mexico, New York, North Carolina, North Dakota, Ohio, Oklahoma, Pennsylvania, Rhode Island, South Carolina, South Dakota, Tennessee, Virginia, West Virginia, and Wisconsin. Introduced North American distribution in blue: US — Montana, Oregon, Utah, Washington, and Wyoming.

==== Section Concolores ====
Section Concolores (Torr. & A.Gray) G.L.Nesom – five species
Scientific name and picture	Author citation	Basionym	Year	Common name(s) and varieties	NS	Habitat	Distribution
S. concolor	(L.); G.L.Nesom	Aster concolor	1753	Eastern silver aster Two varieties: S. c. var. concolor; S. c. var. devestitum	G5	Scrub, flatwoods, fields, roadsides 0–600 m (0–1,970 ft)	Symphyotrichum concolor distribution map: Bahamas and US (Alabama, Delaware, Florida, Georgia, Kentucky, Louisiana, Maryland, Massachusetts, Mississippi, New Jersey, New York, North Carolina, Rhode Island, South Carolina, Tennessee, and Virginia).
S. lucayanum	(Britton); G.L.Nesom	Aster lucayanus	1906	Pineland aster	NL	Pine woodlands and wetland edges 0–12 m (0–40 ft) (Note: Elevation on the island of Grand Bahama)	Endemic to the island of Grand Bahama
S. plumosum	(Small); Semple	Aster plumosus	1924		G2	Deep, sandy soils, pine flatwoods, pine-scrub oak woods 0–40 m (0–130 ft)	Map of Florida showing county borders with green shading on counties representing the distribution of Symphyotrichum plumosum: Central Florida Panhandle — counties of Calhoun, Franklin, Gadsden, Gulf, Jackson, Leon, Liberty, and Wakulla.
S. pratense	(Raf.); G.L.Nesom	Aster pratensis	1817	Barrens silky aster	G4	Prairies and fields, woodland and scrub, roadsides 0–500 m (0–1,640 ft)	Symphyotrichum pratense distribution map: US — Alabama, Arkansas, Florida, Georgia, Kentucky, Louisiana, Mississippi, Tennessee, Texas, and Virginia.
S. sericeum	(Vent.); G.L.Nesom	Aster sericeus	1800	Western silvery aster	G5	Many open habitats 100–500 m (330–1,640 ft)	Symphyotrichum sericeum distribution map: Canada — Manitoba and Ontario; US — Arkansas, Georgia, Indiana, Iowa, Kansas, Michigan, Minnesota, Missouri, Nebraska, North Dakota, Ohio, Oklahoma, South Dakota, Tennessee, Texas, and Wisconsin.

==== Subgenus Virgulus named hybrids ====
Subgenus Virgulus named hybrids – three
Scientific name and picture	Author citation	Basionym	Year	Common name(s)	Parents	Habitat	Distribution
S. × amethystinum	(Nutt.); G.L.Nesom	Aster amethystinus	1840	Amethyst aster	S. ericoides × S. novae-angliae	Prairies or fields, disturbed ground, near parent plants 200–400 m (660–1,310 ft)	Symphyotrichum × amethystinum recorded occurrences: Canada — Ontario; US — Colorado, Connecticut, Illinois, Indiana, Iowa, Kentucky, Maryland, Massachusetts, Minnesota, Missouri, Nebraska, New Jersey, New York, North Dakota, Pennsylvania, Rhode Island, Vermont, Washington, and Wisconsin.
S. × batesii	(Rydb.); G.L.Nesom	Aster batesii	1931		S. ericoides × S. oblongifolium		Symphyotrichum × batesii recorded occurrences map: Nebraska.
S. × columbianum	(Piper); G.L.Nesom	Aster columbianus	1913		S. campestre × S. ericoides		Symphyotrichum × columbianum recorded occurrences map: Oregon and Washington.

=== Subgenus Ascendentes ===
This subgenus contains two allopolyploid species derived from the historic hybridization of plants from the subgenera Symphyotrichum and Virgulus.

Subgenus Ascendentes (Rydb.) Semple – two species
Scientific name and picture	Author citation	Basionym	Year	Common name(s)	NS	Habitat	Distribution
S. ascendens	(Lindl.); G.L.Nesom	Aster ascendens	1834	Long-leaved aster; Intermountain aster; Western aster	G5	Grasslands, sagebrush steppe, meadows 500–3,200 m (1,640–10,500 ft)	Symphyotrichum ascendens distribution map: Canada — Alberta, British Columbia, and Saskatchewan; Canada — Arizona, California, Colorado, Idaho, Montana, Nevada, New Mexico, North Dakota, Oregon, Utah, Washington, and Wyoming.
S. defoliatum	(Parish); G.L.Nesom	Aster defoliatus	1904	San Bernardino aster	G2	Seeps, marshes, swamps, meadows, montane forests, coastal scrubs 0–2,050 m (0–6,730 ft)	Topographical map of California with the range of Symphyotrichum defoliatum outlined in red: San Gabriel Mountains, San Bernardino Mountains, and Peninsular Ranges.

=== Subgenus Symphyotrichum ===
==== Section Conyzopsis ====
The three species in section Conyzopsis have reduced or absent ray florets.

Section Conyzopsis (Torr. & A.Gray) G.L.Nesom – three species
Scientific name and picture	Author citation	Basionym	Year	Common name(s)	NS	Habitat	Distribution
S. ciliatum	(Ledeb.); G.L.Nesom	Erigeron ciliatus	1829	Rayless annual aster; Rayless alkali aster	G5	Moist prairies, steppes, salty areas (natural or manmade); 0–2,000 m (0–6,560 ft)	Symphyotrichum ciliatum native distribution map: Canada — Alberta, British Columbia, Manitoba, New Brunswick, Northwest Territories, Ontario, Québec, Saskatchewan, and Yukon; China — China North-Central, China Southeast, Heilongjiang, Inner Mongolia, Jilin, Liaoning, Manchuria, and Xinjiang; Kazakhstan; Kyrgyzstan; Mongolia; Russia — Altai Republic, Krasnoyarsk Krai, Primorsky Krai, Sakhalin, Tuva, Western Siberia, and Zabaykalsky Krai; Tadzhikistan; US — Alaska, Colorado, Idaho, Illinois, Indiana, Iowa, Kansas, Maine, Michigan, Minnesota, Missouri, Montana, Nebraska, New York, North Dakota, Ohio, Oklahoma, Pennsylvania, South Dakota, Utah, Washington, Wisconsin, and Wyoming; Uzbekistan.
S. frondosum	(Nutt.); G.L.Nesom	Tripolium frondosum	1840	Short-rayed alkali aster	G4	Wet meadows, marshes, saline conditions 10–2,200 m (30–7,220 ft)	Symphyotrichum frondosum distribution map: Canada — British Columbia; Mexico — Baja California; US — Arizona, California, Colorado, Idaho, Nevada, New Mexico, Oregon, Utah, Washington, and Wyoming.
S. laurentianum	(Fernald); G.L.Nesom	Aster laurentianus	1914	Gulf of St. Lawrence aster	G1	Brackish or salty marshes, shores, and dunes Sea level (0 m (0 ft))	Symphyotrichum laurentianum distribution map: Canada — New Brunswick, Prince Edward Island, and Québec on the south shores of the Gulf of St. Lawrence.

==== Section Occidentales ====
Section Occidentales (Rydb.) G.L.Nesom – eleven species
Scientific name and picture	Author citation	Basionym	Year	Common name(s) and varieties	NS	Habitat	Distribution
S. chilense	(Nees); G.L.Nesom	Aster chilensis	1832	Pacific aster; Common California aster	G5	Coastal salt marshes, dunes and banks, grasslands, coniferous forests 0–500 m (0–1,640 ft)	Symphyotrichum chilense distribution map: Canada — British Columbia; US — Washington, Oregon, and California including the Channel Islands.
S. eatonii	(A.Gray); G.L.Nesom	Aster foliaceus var. eatonii	1884	Eaton's aster	G5	Sunny wetlands 500–3,100 m (1,640–10,170 ft)	Symphyotrichum eatonii distribution map: Canada — Alberta, British Columbia, and Saskatchewan; US — Arizona, California, Colorado, Idaho, Montana, Nevada, New Mexico, Oregon, Utah, Washington, and Wyoming.
S. foliaceum	(Lindl. ex DC.); G.L.Nesom	Aster foliaceus	1836	Alpine leafybract aster; Leafy aster; Leafy-bracted aster; Five varieties: S. f. var. foliaceum; S. f. var. apricum; S. f. var. canbyi; S. f. var. cusickii (Cusick's aster) (Note: In FNA as Symphyotrichum cusickii); S. f. var. parryi	G5	Meadows, open areas in woods, slopes, grasslands 1,000–3,600 m (3,280–11,810 ft)	Symphyotrichum foliaceum distribution map: Canada — Alberta and British Columbia; US — Alaska, Arizona, California, Colorado, Idaho, Montana, Nevada, New Mexico, Oregon, Utah, Washington, and Wyoming.
S. greatae	(Parish); G.L.Nesom	Aster greatae	1902	Greata's aster	G2	Damp places in canyons of the south slopes of the San Gabriel Mountains of California; 300–2,000 m (980–6,560 ft)	Symphyotrichum greatae distribution map: on south slopes of the San Gabriel Mountains in California.
S. hallii	(A.Gray); G.L.Nesom	Aster hallii	1872	Hall's aster	G4	Grasslands and meadows with summer dryness 0–500 m (0–1,640 ft)	Symphyotrichum hallii distribution map: Oregon and Washington — Puget Sound region, Willamette Valley, outliers in Columbia Gorge and central Washington. County distribution: Oregon — Benton, Clackamas, Douglas, Hood River, Josephine, Lane, Linn, Marion, Multnomah, Polk, and Wasco; Washington — Clark, King, Okanogan, and Skagit.
S. hendersonii	(Fernald); G.L.Nesom	Aster hendersonii	1895	Henderson's aster	G4	Meadows, forest openings, banks 1,000–1,500 m (3,280–4,920 ft) and higher	Symphyotrichum hendersonii distribution map: US — California, Idaho, Montana, Oregon, and Washington.
S. jessicae	(Piper); G.L.Nesom	Aster jessicae	1898	Jessica's aster	G2	Dry grasslands, meadows, banks, woodland openings 500–1,200 m (1,640–3,940 ft)	Symphyotrichum jessicae distribution map: Palouse River and Clearwater River (Idaho) drainages; Idaho counties — Clearwater, Idaho, Latah, Lewis, and Nez Perce; Washington counties — Columbia, Walla Walla, and Whitman.
S. lentum	(Greene); G.L.Nesom	Aster lentus	1894	Suisun marsh aster	G2	Freshwater marshes and swamps 0–300 m (0–980 ft)	Symphyotrichum lentum distribution map: California counties of Contra Costa, Napa, Sacramento, San Joaquin, Solano, and Yolo.
S. molle	(Rydb.); G.L.Nesom	Aster mollis	1901	Soft aster	G3	Dry montane meadows 2,000–3,000 m (6,560–9,840 ft)	Symphyotrichum molle distribution map: Bighorn Mountains of Montana and Wyoming outlined in white.
S. spathulatum	(Lindl.); G.L.Nesom	Aster spathulatus	1834	Western mountain aster Three varieties: S. s. var. spathulatum; S. s. var. intermedium; S. s. var. yosemitanum (western bog aster)	G5	Montane meadows, open woodlands 100–2,900 m (330–9,510 ft)	Symphyotrichum spathulatum distribution map: Canada — Alberta and British Columbia; Mexico — Baja California; US — California, Colorado, Idaho, Montana, Nevada, New Mexico, Oregon, Utah, Washington, and Wyoming.
S. subspicatum	(Nees); G.L.Nesom	Aster subspicatus	1832	Douglas's aster	G5	Disturbed and weedy open areas, marshes, thickets 0–1,000 m (0–3,280 ft)	Symphyotrichum subspicatum distribution map: Canada — Alberta and British Columbia; US — Alaska, California, Idaho, Montana, Oregon, and Washington.

==== Section Turbinelli ====
Section Turbinelli (Rydb.) Semple – one species
Scientific name and picture	Author citation	Basionym	Year	Common name(s)	NS	Habitat	Distribution
S. turbinellum	(Lindl.); G.L.Nesom	Aster turbinellus	1835	Prairie aster	G4	Generally dry, acidic soils 60–900 m (200–2,950 ft)	Symphyotrichum turbinellum distribution map: US — Primarily the Ozarks of Arkansas, Illinois, Iowa, Kansas, Louisiana, Missouri, Nebraska, and Oklahoma.

==== Section Symphyotrichum ====
===== Subsection Dumosi =====
Subsection Dumosi (Torr. & A.Gray) G.L.Nesom – seventeen species
Scientific name and picture	Author citation	Basionym	Year	Common name(s) and varieties	NS	Habitat	Distribution
S. boreale	(Torr. & A.Gray); Á.Löve & D.Löve	Aster laxifolius var. borealis	1841	Rush aster; Slender white aster; Northern bog aster	G5	Calcareous areas, wetland areas 0–1,500 m (0–4,920 ft)	Symphyotrichum boreale native distribution: Canada — Alberta, British Columbia, Manitoba, New Brunswick, Newfoundland, Northwest Territories, Nova Scotia, Nunavut, Ontario, Prince Edward Island, Québec, Saskatchewan, and Yukon; US — Alaska, Colorado, Idaho, Illinois, Indiana, Iowa, Massachusetts, Michigan, Minnesota, Montana, Nebraska, New Hampshire, New Jersey, New York, North Dakota, Ohio, Pennsylvania, South Dakota, Vermont, Washington, West Virginia, Wisconsin, and Wyoming
S. bullatum	(Klatt); G.L.Nesom	Aster bullatus	1894		NL	Wet ledges 37–1,750 m (120–5,740 ft)	Symphyotrichum bullatum distribution map: Belize, Guatemala, Honduras, and Mexico (excluding northwest Mexico)
S. burgessii	(Britton); G.L.Nesom	Aster burgessii	1914		NL	Rocky river banks	Symphyotrichum burgessii distribution map: western provinces of Cuba with 2011 names — Artemisa, Cienfuegos, La Habana, Matanzas, Mayabeque, Pinar del Río, Sancti Spíritus, and Villa Clara
S. carnerosanum	(S.Watson); G.L.Nesom	Aster carnerosanus	1891		NL	495–2,850 m (1,620–9,350 ft)	Symphyotrichum carnerosanum distribution map: Mexican states — Coahuila, Nuevo León, and Tamaulipas.
S. dumosum	(L.); G.L.Nesom	Aster dumosus	1753	Bushy aster	G5	Wetlands, muddy or mucky areas, sand, woods 0–700 m (0–2,300 ft)	Symphyotrichum dumosum distribution map: Canada — New Brunswick and Ontario; Dominican Republic; Haiti; US — Alabama, Arkansas, Connecticut, Delaware, District of Columbia, Florida, Georgia, Illinois, Indiana, Iowa, Kentucky, Louisiana, Maine, Maryland, Massachusetts, Michigan, Mississippi, Missouri, New Hampshire, New Jersey, New York, North Carolina, Ohio, Oklahoma, Pennsylvania, Rhode Island, South Carolina, Tennessee, Texas, Virginia, West Virginia, and Wisconsin.
S. eulae	(Shinners); G.L.Nesom	Aster eulae	1950	Eula's aster	G4	Part shade, soils with clay or silt, bottom areas or stream banks 0–100 m (0–330 ft)	Endemic to Texas (Note: This is a county map of east central Texas showing the range of S. eulae as described by Lloyd Herbert Shinners. Darker green shaded counties were in Shinners' 1950 protologue of Aster eulae. Lighter green shaded counties are within the area covered by Shinners' description. Darker green counties are, alphabetically, as follows: Bexar, Calhoun, Cooke, Dallas, Denton, Hill, Hunt, Kaufman, Navarro, Rockwall, Tarrant, Wise, and Wood. The following counties are shaded lighter green because they are within Shinners' range but are not specifically named by him: Anderson, Austin, Bastrop, Bell, Bosque, Brazos, Burleson, Caldwell, Collin, Colorado, Comal, Coryell, DeWitt, Ellis, Falls, Fayette, Freestone, Goliad, Gonzales, Guadalupe, Hays, Henderson, Hood, Jack, Johnson, Karnes, Lavaca, Lee, Leon, Limestone, Madison, McLennan, Milam, Parker, Rains, Robertson, Smith, Somervell, Travis, Van Zandt, Victoria, Waller, and Washington. Williamson, and Wilson. Only McLennan County is green on the S. eulae page in the USDA PLANTS database.)
S. lanceolatum	(Willd.); G.L.Nesom	Aster lanceolatus	1803	Lance-leaved aster; Panicled aster; White panicled aster; Five varieties: S. l. var. lanceolatum; S. l. var. hesperium; S. l. var. hirsuticaule; S. l. var. interior; S. l. var. latifolium	G5	Stream banks, thickets, borders, ditches, meadows, mucky soils (depending on variety); 10–2,700 m (30–8,860 ft)	Symphyotrichum lanceolatum distribution map Canada — Alberta, British Columbia, Manitoba, New Brunswick, Newfoundland, Northwest Territories, Nova Scotia, Ontario, Prince Edward Island, Québec, and Saskatchewan; Mexico — Baja California, Chihuahua, and Sonora; US — Alabama, Arizona, Arkansas, California, Colorado, Connecticut, District of Columbia, Florida, Georgia, Idaho, Illinois, Indiana, Iowa, Kansas, Kentucky, Louisiana, Maine, Maryland, Massachusetts, Michigan, Minnesota, Mississippi, Missouri, Montana, Nebraska, Nevada, New Hampshire, New Jersey, New Mexico, New York, North Carolina, North Dakota, Ohio, Oklahoma, Oregon, Pennsylvania, Rhode Island, South Carolina, South Dakota, Tennessee, Texas, Utah, Vermont, Virginia, Washington, West Virginia, Wisconsin, and Wyoming.
S. lateriflorum	(L.); Á.Löve & D.Löve	Solidago lateriflora	1753	Calico aster; White woodland aster; Side-flowering aster	G5	Mostly shade, dry to humid soils, woodland edges 0–400 m (0–1,310 ft)	Symphyotrichum lateriflorum distribution map: Canada — Manitoba, New Brunswick, Nova Scotia, Ontario, Prince Edward Island, and Québec; Mexico — Veracruz; US — Alabama, Arkansas, Connecticut, Delaware, District of Columbia, Florida, Georgia, Illinois, Indiana, Iowa, Kansas, Kentucky, Louisiana, Maine, Maryland, Massachusetts, Michigan, Minnesota, Mississippi, Missouri, Nebraska, New Hampshire, New Jersey, New York, North Carolina, Ohio, Oklahoma, Pennsylvania, Rhode Island, South Carolina, South Dakota, Tennessee, Texas, Vermont, Virginia, West Virginia, and Wisconsin.
S. leone	(Britton); G.L.Nesom	Aster leonis	1920		NL	Marshes	Symphyotrichum leone distribution map: Cuba.
S. nahanniense	(Cody); Semple	Aster nahanniensis	1974	Nahanni aster	G3	Stream banks near hot mineral springs About 1,000 m (3,280 ft)	Nahanni National; Park Reserve; Northwest Territories (Canada)
S. ontarionis	(Wiegand); G.L.Nesom	Aster ontarionis	1928	Ontario aster; Bottomland aster; Two varieties: S. o. var. ontarionis; S. o. var. glabratum	G5	Moist soils or shores, other wetlands, field edges 10–300 m (30–980 ft)	Symphyotrichum ontarionis distribution map: Canada — Ontario and Québec; US — Alabama, Illinois, Indiana, Iowa, Kansas, Kentucky, Louisiana, Michigan, Minnesota, Mississippi, Missouri, Nebraska, New York, North Carolina, Oklahoma, Pennsylvania, South Dakota, Tennessee, Texas, Vermont, and Wisconsin.
S. praealtum	(Poir.); G.L.Nesom	Aster praealtus	1811	Willowleaf aster; Willow aster	G5	Usually moist and wet areas 0–400 m (0–1,310 ft)	Symphyotrichum praealtum distribution map: Canada — Ontario; Mexico — Chihuahua, Coahuila, and Nuevo León; US — Alabama, Arkansas, Connecticut, Delaware, District of Columbia, Florida, Illinois, Indiana, Iowa, Kansas, Kentucky, Louisiana, Maine, Maryland, Massachusetts, Michigan, Minnesota, Mississippi, Missouri, Nebraska, New Hampshire, New Jersey, New York, Ohio, Oklahoma, Pennsylvania, Rhode Island, South Dakota, Tennessee, Texas, Virginia, West Virginia, and Wisconsin.
S. racemosum	(Elliott); G.L.Nesom	Aster racemosus	1823	Small white aster; Smooth white oldfield aster	G4	Moist to wet, often brackish, soils 0–200 m (0–660 ft)	Symphyotrichum racemosum distribution map: Canada (introduced) – Ontario and New Brunswick; US (native) — Alabama, Arkansas, Connecticut, Delaware, District of Columbia, Florida, Georgia, Illinois, Indiana, Iowa, Kentucky, Louisiana, Maine, Maryland, Massachusetts, Missouri, New Jersey, New York, North Carolina, Ohio, Oklahoma, Pennsylvania, Rhode Island, South Carolina, Tennessee, Texas, Vermont, Virginia, and West Virginia.
S. schaffneri	(S.D.Sundb. & A.G.Jones); G.L.Nesom	Aster schaffneri	1986		NL	Disturbed oak forests, secondary vegetation areas, mountain mesophilic forests, rich black or brown soils 120–2,500 m (390–8,200 ft)	Symphyotrichum schaffneri distribution map: Mexico — Hidalgo, Puebla, and Veracruz.
S. simmondsii	(Small); G.L.Nesom	Aster simmondsii	1913	Simmonds' aster	G4	Moist to dry soils 0–50 m (0–160 ft)	Symphyotrichum simmondsii distribution map: US — Florida, Georgia, North Carolina, and South Carolina.
S. tradescantii	(L.); G.L.Nesom	Aster tradescantii	1753	Tradescant's aster; Shore aster	G4	Shores, streams, freshwater estuaries 0–200 m (0–660 ft)	Symphyotrichum tradescantii distribution map: Canada — New Brunswick, Newfoundland, Nova Scotia, and Québec; US — Maine, Massachusetts, New Hampshire, New Jersey, New York, Rhode Island, and Vermont.
S. welshii	(Cronquist); G.L.Nesom	Aster welshii	1994	Welsh's aster	G2	Wet soils in dry areas 1,300–2,300 m (4,270–7,550 ft)	Symphyotrichum welshii distribution map: US — Arizona, Idaho, Montana, Utah, and Wyoming.

===== Subsection Heterophylli =====
Subsection Heterophylli (Nees) Semple

====== Series Concinni ======
Series Concinni (Nees) Semple – two species
Scientific name and picture	Author citation	Basionym	Year	Common name(s) and varieties	NS	Habitat	Distribution
S. laeve	(L.); Á.Löve & D.Löve	Aster laevis	1753	Smooth aster Four varieties: S. l. var. laeve; S. l. var. concinnum; S. l. var. geyeri (Geyer’s aster); S. l. var. purpuratum	G5	Open and dry habitats 0–2,400 m (0–7,870 ft)	Symphyotrichum laeve distribution map: Canada — Alberta, British Columbia, Manitoba, Ontario, Saskatchewan, and Yukon (introduced in New Brunswick and Québec); Mexico — Coahuila; US — Alabama, Arkansas, California, Colorado, Connecticut, Delaware, District of Columbia, Florida, Georgia, Idaho, Illinois, Indiana, Iowa, Kansas, Kentucky, Louisiana, Maine, Maryland, Massachusetts, Michigan, Minnesota, Mississippi, Missouri, Montana, Nebraska, Nevada, New Hampshire, New Jersey, New Mexico, New York, North Carolina, North Dakota, Ohio, Pennsylvania, Rhode Island, South Carolina, South Dakota, Tennessee, Texas, Utah, Vermont, Virginia, Washington, West Virginia, Wisconsin, and Wyoming.
S. oolentangiense	(Riddell); G.L.Nesom	Aster oolentangiensis	1835	Azure aster; Skyblue aster	G5	Dry or dry to wet habitats 50–500 m (160–1,640 ft)	Symphyotrichum oolentangiense distribution map: Canada — Ontario; Mexico — Coahuila; US — Alabama, Arkansas, Florida, Georgia, Illinois, Indiana, Iowa, Kansas, Kentucky, Louisiana, Michigan, Minnesota, Mississippi, Missouri, Nebraska, New York, Ohio, Oklahoma, Pennsylvania, South Dakota, Tennessee, Texas, and Wisconsin.

====== Series Cordifolii ======
Series Cordifolii (G.Don in Loudon) Semple – seven species
Scientific name and picture	Author citation	Basionym	Year	Common name(s) and varieties	NS	Habitat	Distribution
S. anomalum	(Engelm.); G.L.Nesom	Aster anomalus	1843	Manyray aster	G4	Dry soils over limestone, acid soils 50–500 m (160–1,640 ft)	Symphyotrichum anomalum distribution map: US — Arkansas, Illinois, Kansas, Missouri, and Oklahoma.
S. ciliolatum	(Lindl.); Á.Löve & D.Löve	Aster ciliolatus	1836	Lindley's aster; Fringed blue aster	G5	Rich, open deciduous forests, trails, stream banks 0–2,000 m (0–6,560 ft)	Symphyotrichum ciliolatum distribution map: Canada — Alberta, British Columbia, Manitoba, New Brunswick, Newfoundland, Northwest Territories, Nova Scotia, Ontario, Québec, Saskatchewan, and Yukon; US — Illinois, Maine, Massachusetts, Michigan, Minnesota, Montana, New Hampshire, New York, North Dakota, South Dakota, Vermont, Wisconsin, and Wyoming.
S. cordifolium	(L.); G.L.Nesom	Aster cordifolius	1753	Heartleaf aster; Common blue wood aster	G5	Mostly rich, moist soils and woods 0–1,200 m (0–3,940 ft)	Symphyotrichum cordifolium distribution map: Canada — Manitoba, New Brunswick, Nova Scotia, Ontario, Prince Edward Island, and Québec; US — Alabama, Arkansas, Connecticut, District of Columbia, Georgia, Illinois, Indiana, Iowa, Kentucky, Maine, Maryland, Massachusetts, Michigan, Minnesota, Missouri, Nebraska, New Hampshire, New Jersey, New York, North Carolina, Ohio, Oklahoma, Pennsylvania, Rhode Island, South Carolina, South Dakota, Tennessee, Vermont, Virginia, West Virginia, and Wisconsin.
S. drummondii	(Lindl.); G.L.Nesom	Aster drummondii	1835	Drummond's aster Two varieties: S. d. var. drummondii; S. d. var. texanum (Texas aster)	G5	Old fields, woodlands, savannas depending on variety 0–500 m (0–1,640 ft)	Symphyotrichum drummondii distribution map: Mexico — Coahuila; US — Alabama, Arkansas, Georgia, Illinois, Indiana, Iowa, Kansas, Kentucky, Louisiana, Maryland, Michigan, Minnesota, Mississippi, Missouri, Nebraska, Ohio, Oklahoma, Pennsylvania, Tennessee, Texas, West Virginia, and Wisconsin.
S. shortii	(Lindl.); G.L.Nesom	Aster shortii	1834	Short's aster	G5	Thin rocky soils of woodlands and thickets often around limestone bluffs 100–500 m (330–1,640 ft)	Symphyotrichum shortii native distribution: Canada — Ontario; US — Alabama, Arkansas, Florida, Georgia, Illinois, Indiana, Iowa, Kentucky, Maryland, Michigan, Minnesota, Mississippi, North Carolina, Pennsylvania, Tennessee, Virginia, West Virginia, and Wisconsin.
S. undulatum	(L.); G.L.Nesom	Aster undulatus	1753	Wavyleaf aster	G5	Dry or well-drained loamy or rocky soils 200–1,500 m (660–4,920 ft)	Symphyotrichum undulatum native distribution: Canada — Nova Scotia and Ontario; US — Alabama, Connecticut, Delaware, District of Columbia, Florida, Georgia, Illinois, Indiana, Kentucky, Louisiana, Maine, Maryland, Massachusetts, Mississippi, New Hampshire, New Jersey, New York, North Carolina, Ohio, Pennsylvania, Rhode Island, South Carolina, Tennessee, Vermont, Virginia, and West Virginia.
S. urophyllum	(Lindl.); G.L.Nesom	Aster urophyllus	1836	White arrowleaf aster; Arrowleaf aster	G4	Open, dry to mesic habitats 40–300 m (130–980 ft) and higher	Symphyotrichum urophyllum native distribution: Canada — Ontario; US — Alabama, Arkansas, Florida, Georgia, Illinois, Indiana, Iowa, Kansas, Kentucky, Maine, Maryland, Massachusetts, Michigan, Minnesota, Mississippi, Missouri, Nebraska, New Jersey, New York, North Carolina, North Dakota, Ohio, Oklahoma, Pennsylvania, South Carolina, Tennessee, Vermont, Virginia, West Virginia, and Wisconsin.

===== Subsection Porteriani =====
Subsection Porteriani (Rydb.) G.L.Nesom – five species
Scientific name and picture	Author citation	Basionym	Year	Common name(s) and varieties	NS	Habitat	Distribution
S. depauperatum	(Fernald); G.L.Nesom	Aster depauperatus	1908	Serpentine aster; Starved aster	G2	Serpentine or diabasic soils 400–1,000 m (1,310–3,280 ft)	Symphyotrichum depauperatum distribution map: US — Maryland (Baltimore and Cecil Counties); North Carolina (Granville County); and, Pennsylvania (Chester, Delaware, and Lancaster Counties).
S. kentuckiense	(Britton); Medley	Aster kentuckiensis	1901	Price's aster; Kentucky aster	G4	Limestone cedar glades and limestone roadsides	Symphyotrichum kentuckiense recorded occurrences: US — Alabama, Georgia, Kentucky, and Tennessee
S. parviceps	(E.S.Burgess); G.L.Nesom	Aster ericoides var. parviceps	1898	Smallhead aster; Small white aster	G4	Dry, sandy, or loamy soils; barrens, fields, roadsides, old cemeteries 200–400 m (660–1,310 ft)	Symphyotrichum parviceps native distribution: US — Arkansas, Illinois, Iowa, Kansas, Missouri, and Oklahoma
S. pilosum	(Willd.); G.L.Nesom	Aster pilosus	1803	Hairy aster; Frost aster; Hairy white oldfield aster; Two varieties: S. p. var. pilosum; S. p. var. pringlei (Pringle's aster)	G5	Various and many, depending on variety 0–1,100 m (0–3,610 ft)	Symphyotrichum pilosum native distribution: Canada — Ontario and Québec; US — Alabama, Arkansas, Connecticut, Delaware, District of Columbia, Florida, Georgia, Illinois, Indiana, Iowa, Kansas, Kentucky, Maine, Maryland, Massachusetts, Michigan, Minnesota, Mississippi, Missouri, Nebraska, New Hampshire, New Jersey, New York, North Carolina, Ohio, Oklahoma, Pennsylvania, Rhode Island, South Carolina, South Dakota, Tennessee, Vermont, Virginia, West Virginia, and Wisconsin.
S. porteri	(A.Gray); G.L.Nesom	Aster porteri	1881	Porter's aster; Smooth white aster	G3	Rocky Mountain foothills 1,800–2,900 m (5,910–9,510 ft)	Symphyotrichum porteri native distribution: US — Colorado counties: Boulder, Douglas, El Paso, Gilpin, Jefferson, Larimer, Las Animas, and Teller; New Mexico counties: Harding and San Miguel; Wyoming counties: Albany, Carbon, and Laramie.

===== Subsection Symphyotrichum =====
====== Series Punicei ======
Series Punicei (House) Semple – five species
Scientific name and picture	Author citation	Basionym	Year	Common name(s) and varieties	NS	Habitat	Distribution
S. elliottii	(Torr. & A.Gray); G.L.Nesom	Aster elliottii	1841	Elliott's aster	G4	Swamps, bogs, marshes, brackish marshes 0–50 m (0–160 ft)	Symphyotrichum elliottii native distribution by state: US Atlantic Coastal Plain — Alabama, Florida, Georgia, Louisiana, North Carolina, South Carolina, and Virginia.
S. firmum	(Nees); G.L.Nesom	Aster firmus	1818	Glossy-leaved aster	G5	Wet soils, fens, marshes 100–400 m (330–1,310 ft)	Symphyotrichum firmum native distribution: Canada — Alberta, Manitoba, Ontario, Saskatchewan; US — Georgia, Iowa, Michigan, Minnesota, Missouri, Nebraska, New York.
S. prenanthoides	(Muhl. ex Willd.); G.L.Nesom	Aster prenanthoides	1803	Crookedstem aster	G4	Mostly wetlands such as swamps and seeps 100–1,500 m (330–4,920 ft)	Symphyotrichum prenanthoides native distribution: Canada — Ontario; US — Connecticut, Delaware, District of Columbia, Illinois, Indiana, Iowa, Kentucky, Maryland, Massachusetts, Michigan, Minnesota, New Jersey, New York, North Carolina, Ohio, Pennsylvania, Virginia, West Virginia, and Wisconsin.
S. puniceum	(L.); Á.Löve & D.Löve	Aster puniceus	1753	Purplestem aster; Red-stemmed aster; Swamp aster; Two varieties: S. p. var. puniceum; S. p. var. scabricaule (roughstem aster)	G5	Wetlands; 0–2,000 m (0–6,560 ft)	Symphyotrichum puniceum native distribution: Canada — Alberta, British Columbia, Labrador, Manitoba, New Brunswick, Newfoundland, Nova Scotia, Ontario, Prince Edward Island, Québec, and Saskatchewan; US — Alabama, Connecticut, Delaware, Georgia, Illinois, Indiana, Iowa, Louisiana, Maine, Maryland, Michigan, Minnesota, Mississippi, Missouri, Nebraska, New Hampshire, New Jersey, New York, North Carolina, North Dakota, Ohio, Pennsylvania, Rhode Island, South Carolina, South Dakota, Tennessee, Texas, Vermont, Virginia, West Virginia, and Wisconsin.
S. rhiannon	Weakley & Govus		2004	Rhiannon's aster; Buck Creek aster	G1	Serpentine barrens 900–1,300 m (2,950–4,270 ft)	Buck Creek; Serpentine Barrens, Clay County, North Carolina (US)

====== Series Symphyotrichum ======
Series Symphyotrichum – four species
Scientific name and picture	Author citation	Basionym	Year	Common name(s) and varieties	NS	Habitat	Distribution
S. anticostense	(Fernald); G.L.Nesom	Aster anticostensis	1915	Anticosti aster	G3	Calcareous river shores, limestone lake shores 0–100 m (0–330 ft)	Symphyotrichum anticostense native distribution: Canada — New Brunswick and Québec; US — Maine.
S. novi-belgii	(L.); G.L.Nesom	Aster novi-belgii	1753	New York aster Four varieties: S. n. var. novi-belgii; S. n. var. crenifolium; S. n. var. elodes; S. n. var. villicaule	G5	Mostly sea or stream shores, thickets, dunes, barrens (depending on variety); 0–800 m (0–2,620 ft)	Symphyotrichum novi-belgii native distribution: Canada — Labrador, New Brunswick, Newfoundland, Nova Scotia, Prince Edward Island, and Québec; US — Connecticut, Maine, Maryland, Massachusetts, New Hampshire, New Jersey, New York, North Carolina, Pennsylvania, Rhode Island, South Carolina, Vermont, Virginia, and West Virginia.
S. retroflexum	(Lindl.); G.L.Nesom	Aster retroflexus	1836	Rigid whitetop aster	G4	Moist or dry wooded areas, moist meadows 400–1,500 m (1,310–4,920 ft)	Symphyotrichum retroflexum native distribution: US — Blue Ridge Mountains of Alabama, Georgia, North Carolina, South Carolina, Tennessee, and Virginia. Source: USDA, NRCS PLANTS Database with added information from John C. Semple's Astereae Lab.
S. robynsianum	(J.Rousseau) Brouillet & Labrecque	Aster robynsianus	1957	Robyn's aster	G5	Moist, open, sandy, gravelly, or rocky habitats 10–400 m (30–1,310 ft)	Symphyotrichum robynsianum native distribution: Canada — Manitoba, Ontario, and Québec; US — Michigan, Minnesota, and Wisconsin.

==== Subgenus Symphyotrichum named hybrids ====
Subgenus Symphyotrichum named hybrids – ten
Scientific name and picture	Author citation	Basionym	Year	Common name(s)	Parents	Habitat	Distribution
S. × finkii	(Rydb.); G.L.Nesom	Aster finkii	1931		S. cordifolium × S. shortii	Wooded bluffs and fencerows	(Note: The locations are from the USDA PLANTS Database with added county information from two sources. Iowa — Fayette; West Virginia — no county information; Wisconsin — Eau Claire, Grant, and Waupaca.)
S. × gravesii	(E.S.Burgess); G.L.Nesom	Aster gravesii	1901	Graves' aster	S. dumosum × S. laeve	Dry woods	Symphyotrichum × gravesii recorded occurrences: Connecticut.
S. × longulum	(E.Sheld.); G.L.Nesom	Aster longulus	1894		S. boreale × S. puniceum	Swampy and marshy areas	Symphyotrichum × longulum recorded occurrences: Canada — Saskatchewan; US — Minnesota, New Jersey, New York, and Wisconsin
S. × priceae	(Britton); G.L.Nesom	Aster priceae	1901		S. kentuckiense × S. pilosum		Kentucky
S. × salignum	(Willd.); G.L.Nesom	Aster salignus	1803		S. lanceolatum var. lanceolatum × S. novi-belgii var. novi-belgii		(Note: There is also an extensive presence of Symphyotrichum × salignum in Europe and western Asia in the following countries: Assam, Austria, Baltic States, Belarus, Belgium, Bulgaria, Czechoslovakia, Denmark, Finland, France, Germany, Great Britain, Hungary, Ireland, Italy, Kazakhstan, Krym, Netherlands, Norway, Poland, Romania, Spain, Sweden, Switzerland, Tadzhikistan, Ukraine, Uzbekistan, and Yugoslavia.)
S. × schistosum	(E.S.Steele); G.L.Nesom	Aster schistosus	1911		S. cordifolium × S. laeve	Shale gravel, dry hills	Symphyotrichum × schistosum recorded occurrences: US — Virginia.
S. × subgeminatum	(Fernald); G.L.Nesom	Aster foliaceus var. subgeminatus	1915		S. ciliolatum × S. novi-belgii var. novi-belgii	"Damp bushy ravine in the limestone tableland"; 200–300 m (660–980 ft)	Map of Symphyotrichum × subgeminatum recorded occurrences: Newfoundland and Québec (Canada).
S. × tardiflorum	(L.); Greuter, M.V.Agab. & Wagenitz	Aster tardiflorus	1763		S. cordifolium × S. puniceum	Along streams	Symphyotrichum × tardiflorum recorded occurrences: New Brunswick, Nova Scotia, and Québec (Canada); New York (US).
S. × versicolor	(Willd.); G.L.Nesom	Aster versicolor	1803	Late Michaelmas daisy	S. laeve var. laeve × S. novi-belgii var. novi-belgii		Symphyotrichum × versicolor recorded occurrences by country in Europe in blue, adjusted on map using current boundaries: Austria; Belgium; Czech Republic; France; Germany; Great Britain; Hungary; Ireland; Italy; Madeira; Netherlands; Norway; Poland; Romania; Slovakia; Spain; Switzerland; Ukraine; and Yugoslavia.
S. × woldenii	(Rydb.); G.L.Nesom	Aster woldenii	1931		S. laeve × S. praealtum		Symphyotrichum × woldenii recorded occurrences: Iowa.
