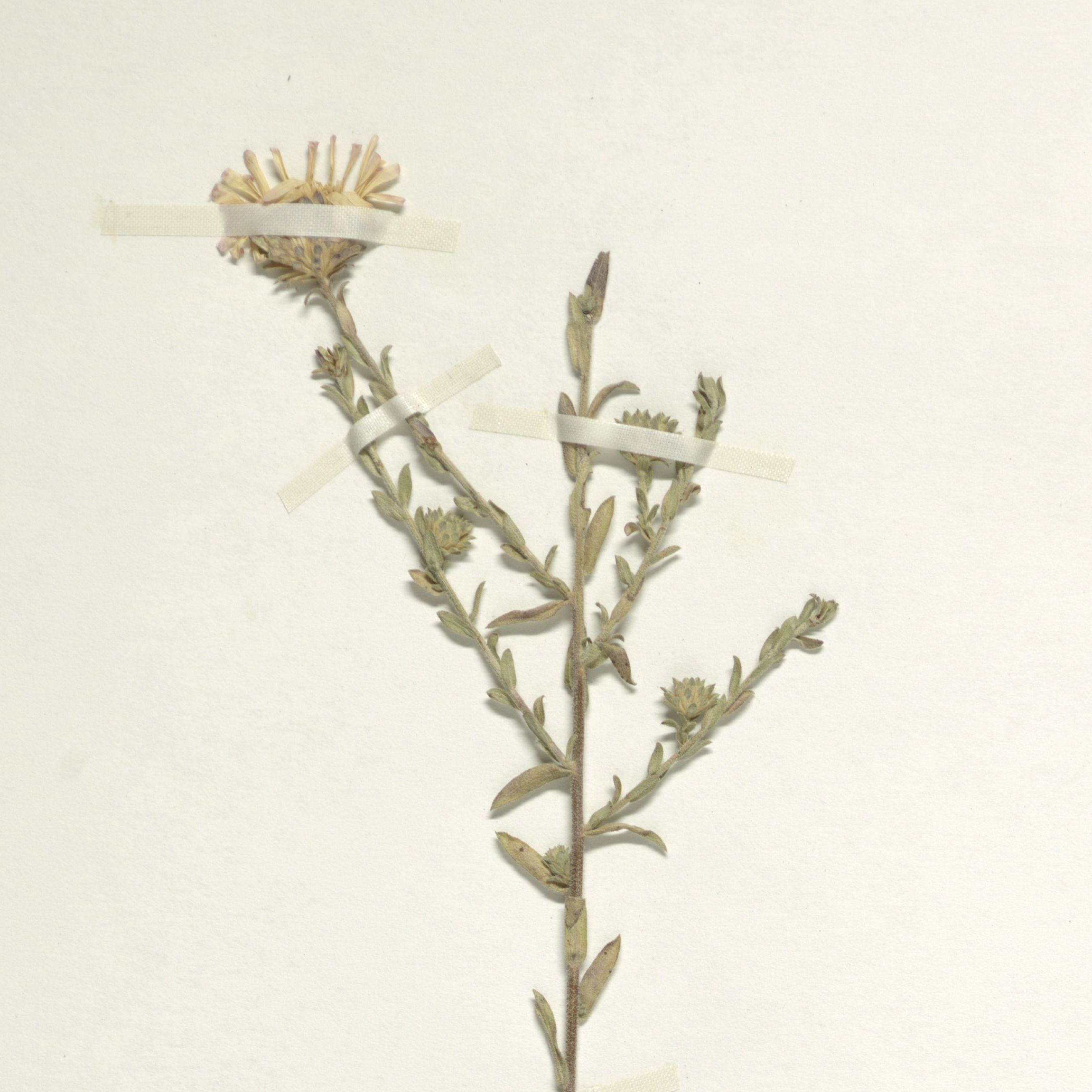

Scientific classification
- Kingdom: Plantae
- Clade: Tracheophytes
- Clade: Angiosperms
- Clade: Eudicots
- Clade: Asterids
- Order: Asterales
- Family: Asteraceae
- Tribe: Astereae
- Subtribe: Symphyotrichinae
- Genus: Symphyotrichum
- Subgenus: Symphyotrichum subg. Virgulus
- Section: Symphyotrichum sect. Grandiflori
- Species: S. hintonii

Binomial name
- Symphyotrichum hintonii (G.L.Nesom) G.L.Nesom
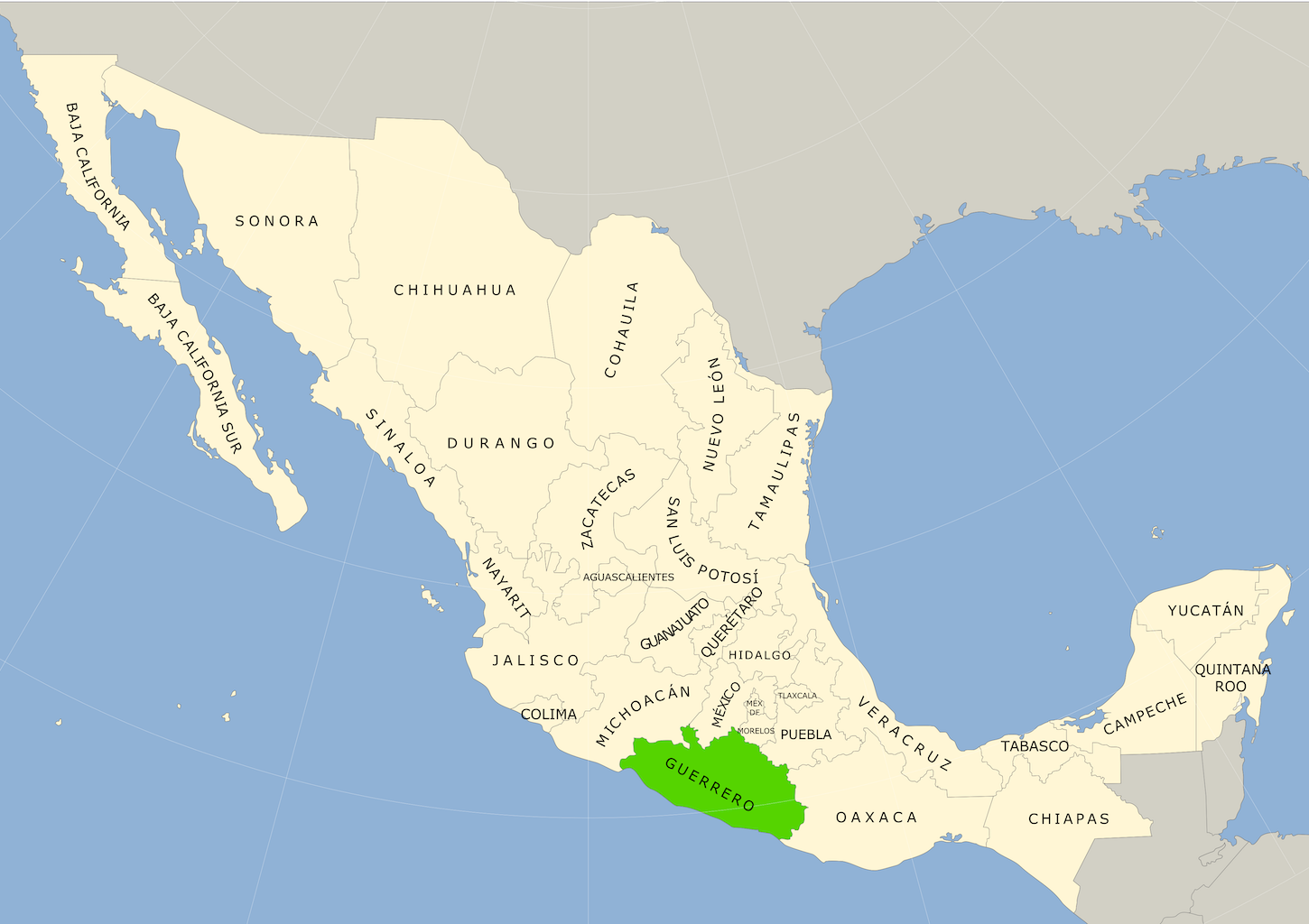
- Native distribution

Synonyms
- Aster hintonii G.L.Nesom

= Symphyotrichum hintonii =

Species of flowering plant in the daisy family

Symphyotrichum hintonii (formerly Aster hintonii) is a species of perennial, herbaceous, flowering plant in the family Asteraceae native to Guerrero, Mexico. It grows in oak and oak-pine woods at elevations of 1,400–2,200 meters (4,600–7,200 feet), blooming white ray florets November–January. It reaches heights of about 40–80 centimeters (16–31 inches).

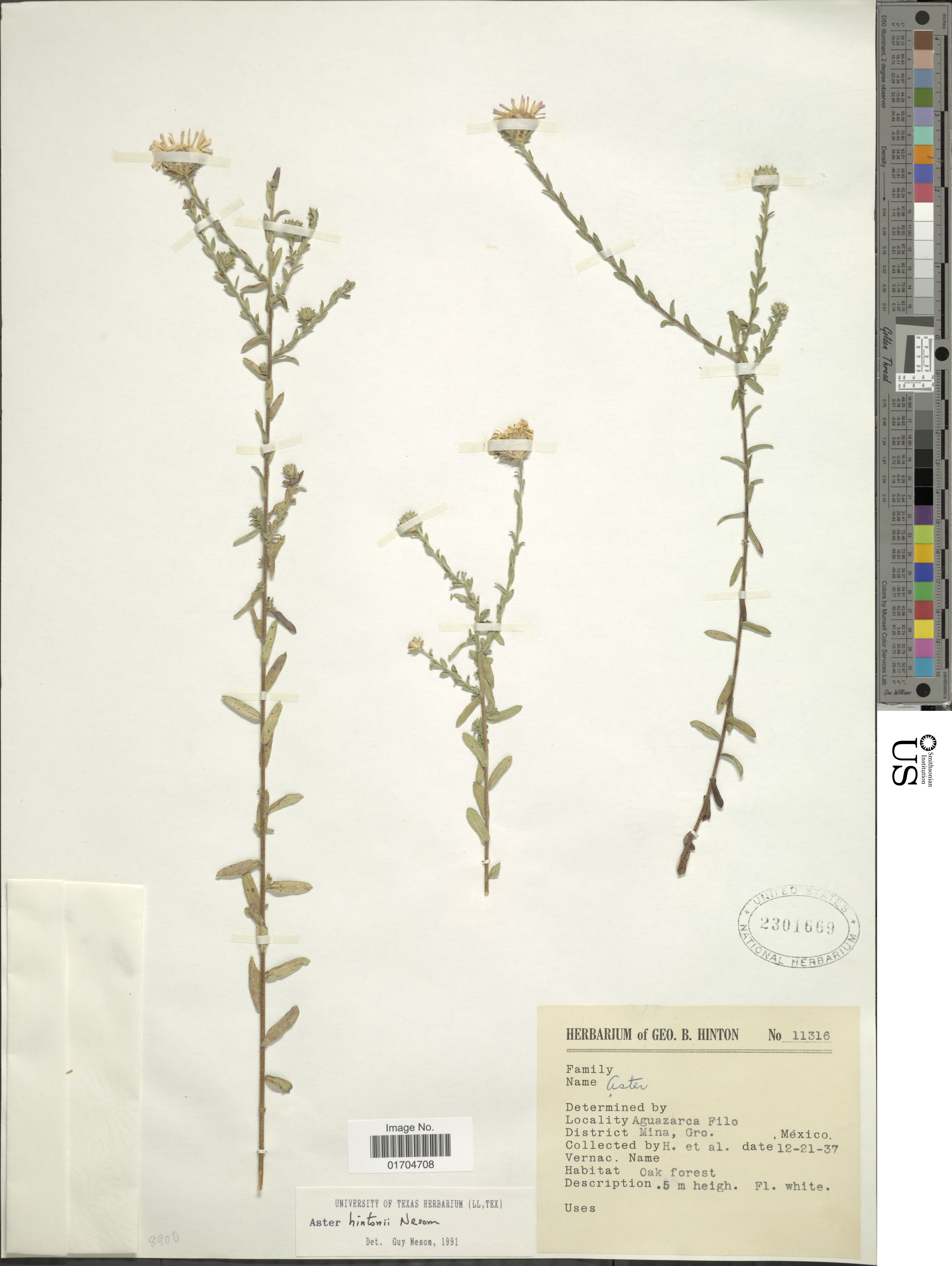
S. hintonii herbarium specimen
