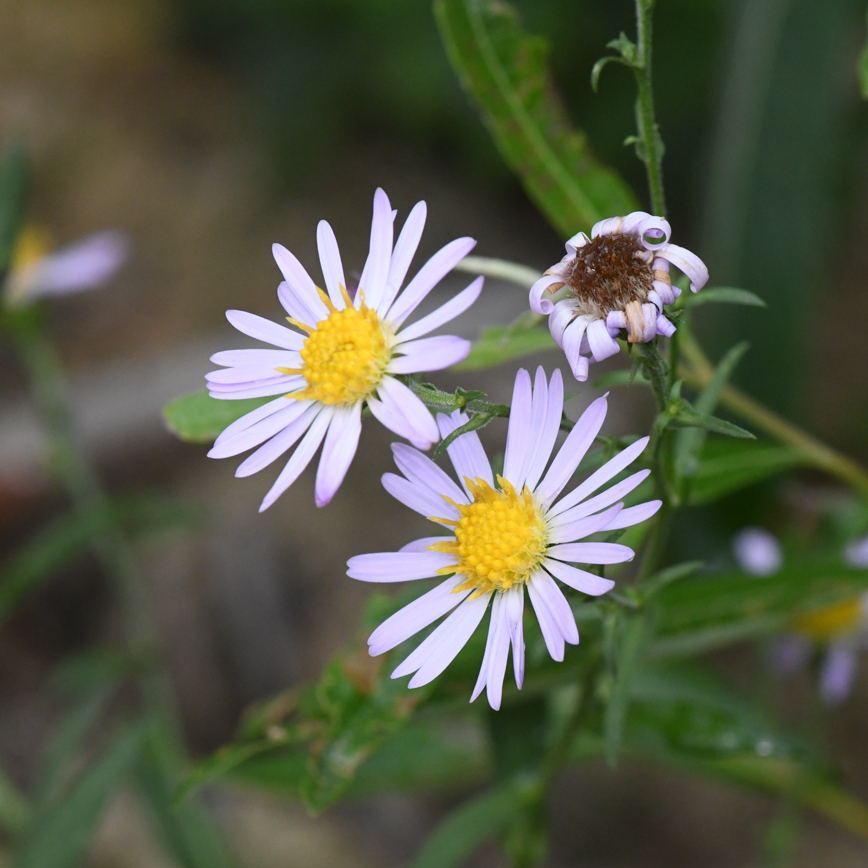

Conservation status
- Imperiled (NatureServe)

Scientific classification
- Kingdom: Plantae
- Clade: Tracheophytes
- Clade: Angiosperms
- Clade: Eudicots
- Clade: Asterids
- Order: Asterales
- Family: Asteraceae
- Tribe: Astereae
- Subtribe: Symphyotrichinae
- Genus: Symphyotrichum
- Subgenus: Symphyotrichum subg. Symphyotrichum
- Section: Symphyotrichum sect. Occidentales
- Species: S. greatae

Binomial name
- Symphyotrichum greatae (Parish) G.L.Nesom
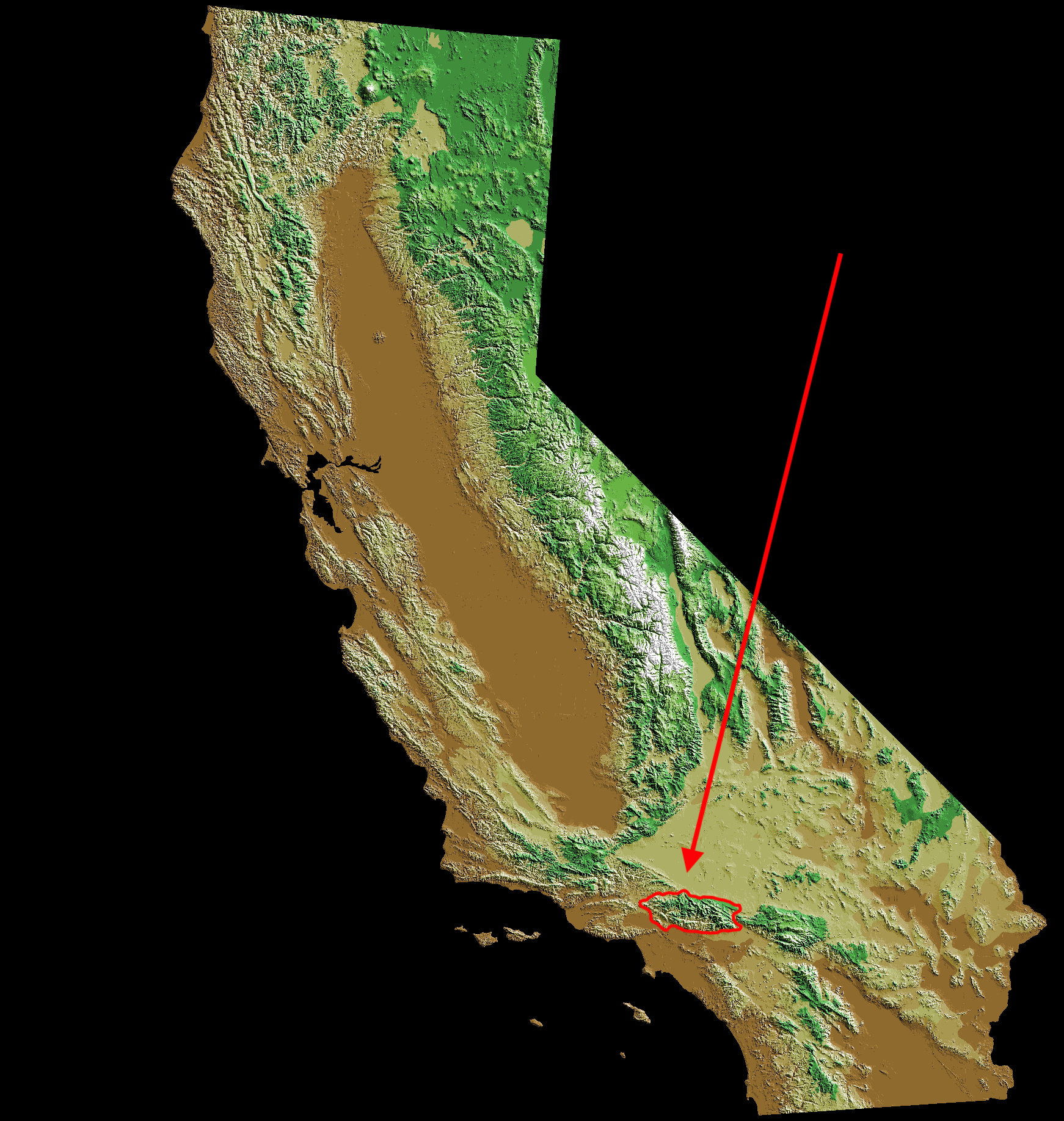
- South slopes of the San Gabriel Mountains of California

Synonyms
- Aster greatae Parish

= Symphyotrichum greatae =

Species of flowering plant from California

Symphyotrichum greatae (formerly Aster greatae) is a species of flowering plant in the family Asteraceae endemic to California and known by the common name Greata's aster.

== Description ==
Symphyotrichum greatae is a colonizing perennial herb growing from a long rhizome. It produces upright to erect stems usually 50 to 120 centimeters (1 3/4 to 4 feet) tall. The leaves are mostly oval in shape and pointed, the ones at the base up to 15 centimeters (6 inches) long. The leaves and parts of the stems are hairy.

The inflorescence is an open array of flower heads amidst leaflike bracts. The flower head contains many pale violet to nearly white ray florets and a center of yellow disc florets. The fruit is a hairy cypsela.

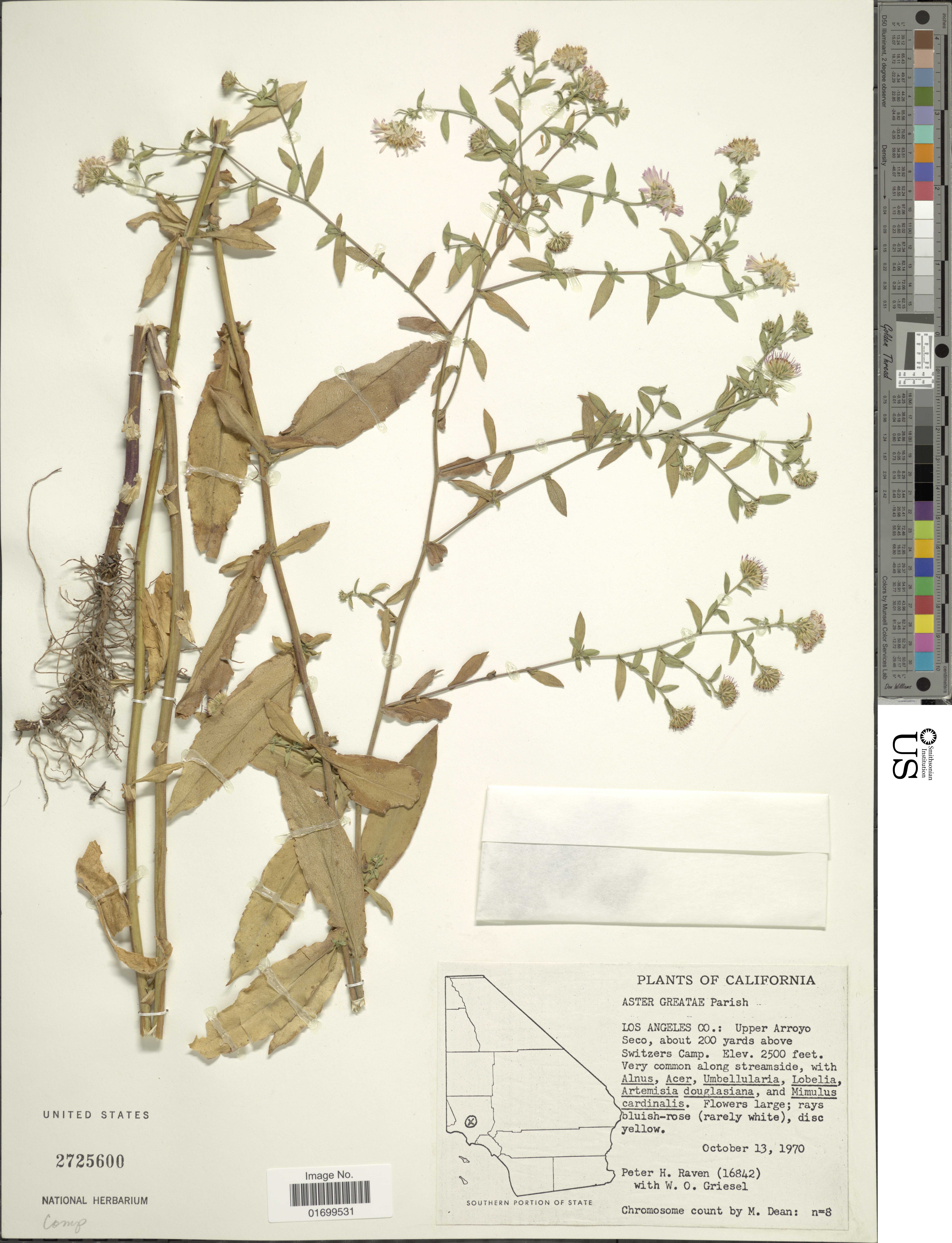
S. greatae herbarium specimen

== Distribution and habitat ==
Symphyotrichum greatae is endemic to the San Gabriel Mountains of Southern California, where it grows in damp areas in the canyons of the southern slopes above the Los Angeles Basin.

== Conservation ==
NatureServe lists it as Imperiled (G2) worldwide.
