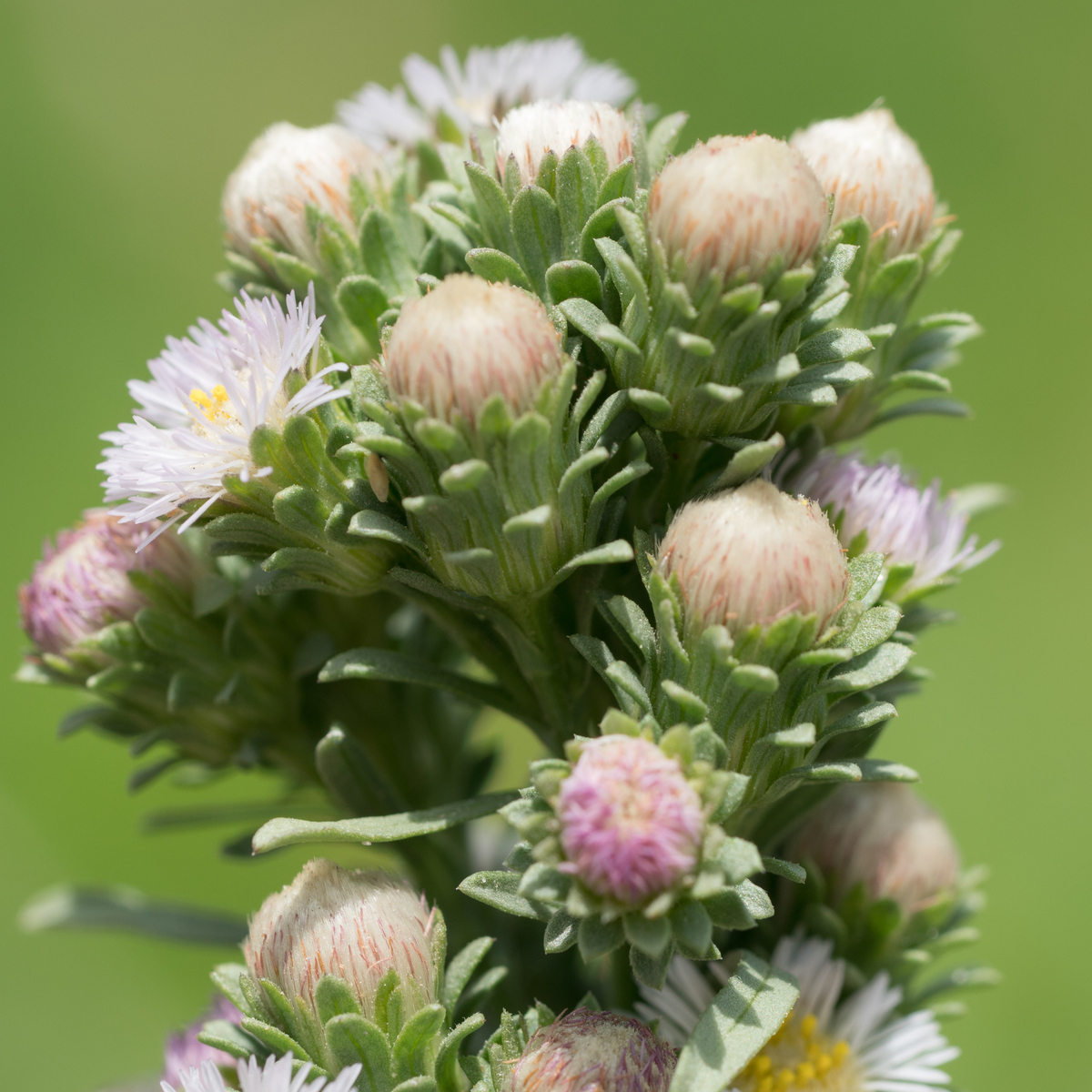

Conservation status
- Apparently Secure (NatureServe)

Scientific classification
- Kingdom: Plantae
- Clade: Tracheophytes
- Clade: Angiosperms
- Clade: Eudicots
- Clade: Asterids
- Order: Asterales
- Family: Asteraceae
- Tribe: Astereae
- Subtribe: Symphyotrichinae
- Genus: Symphyotrichum
- Subgenus: Symphyotrichum subg. Symphyotrichum
- Section: Symphyotrichum sect. Conyzopsis
- Species: S. frondosum

Binomial name
- Symphyotrichum frondosum (Nutt.) G.L.Nesom
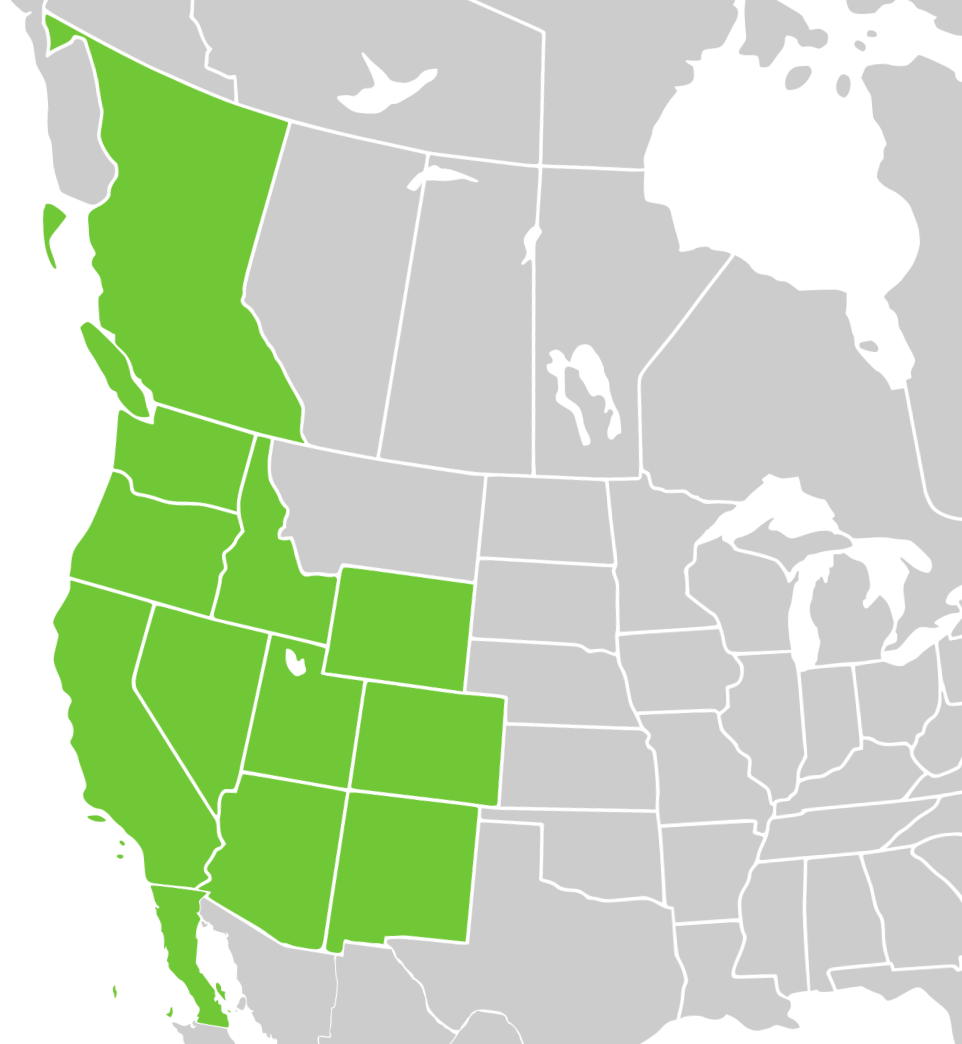
- Native distribution

Synonyms
- Basionym: Tripolium frondosum Nutt.; Alphabetical list: Aster frondosus Torr. & A.Gray; Aster woodhousei Wooton; Brachyactis ciliata var. carnosula Benth.; Brachyactis frondosa A.Gray; Brachyactis woodhousei (Wooton) Wooton & Standl.

= Symphyotrichum frondosum =

Species of flowering plant in the daisy family

Symphyotrichum frondosum (formerly Aster frondosus) is a species of flowering plant in the family Asteraceae native to western North America. Commonly known as short-rayed alkali aster, it is an annual or perennial herbaceous plant that may reach 140 centimeters (55 inches) tall.

== Description ==
Symphyotrichum frondosum is an annual or occasionally perennial herbaceous, flowering plant growing a leaning or erect stem to a maximum height of 5–140 centimeters (2–55 inches). The leaves are a few centimeters long and oval in shape with rounded tips. The stem and leaves are mostly hairless.

The inflorescence is a small array of flower heads containing many short pale pink or lavender ray florets and yellow disc florets. The fruit is a hairy cypsela with white to yellow-tinted pappi.

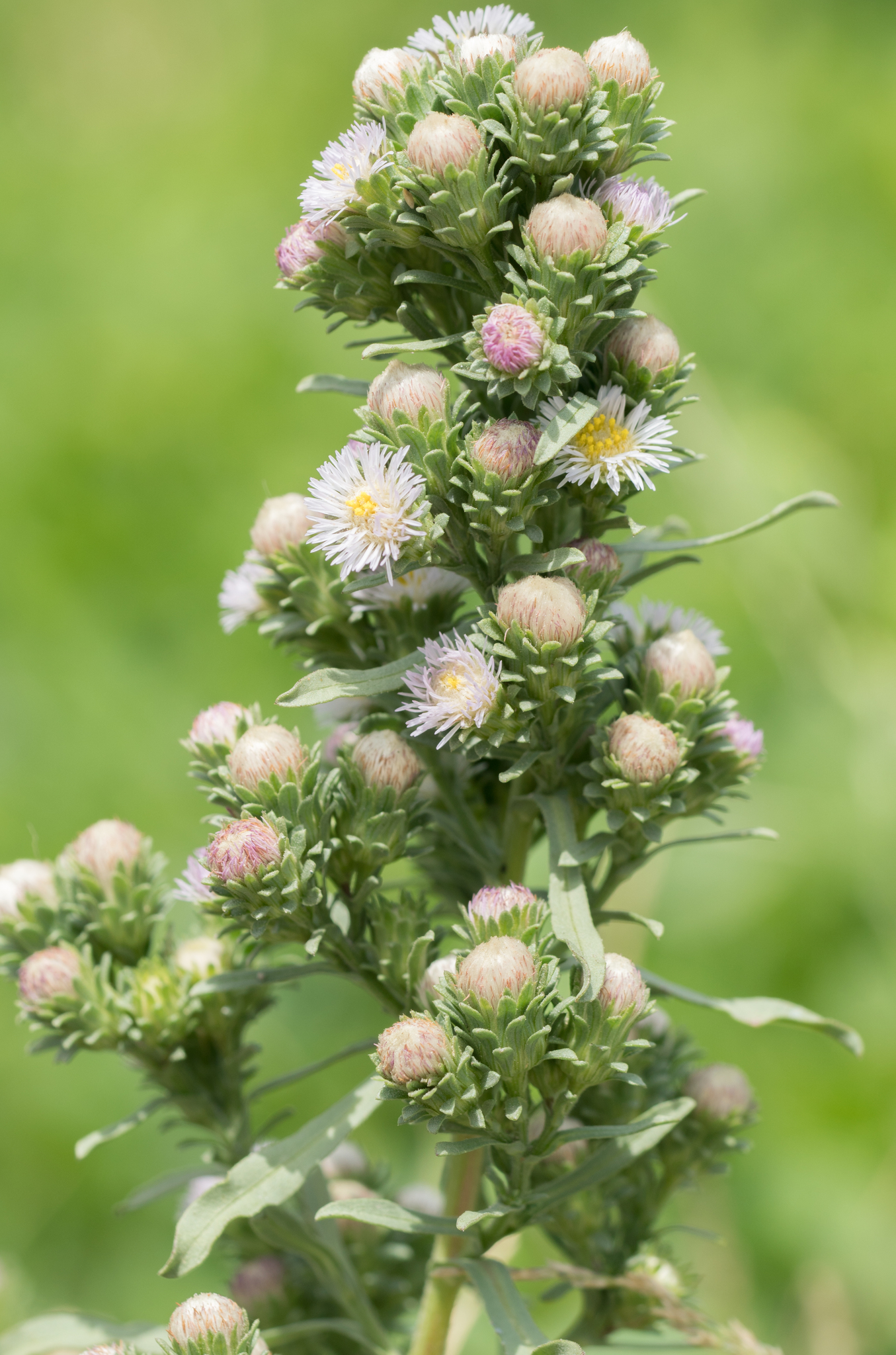
Symphyotrichum frondosum

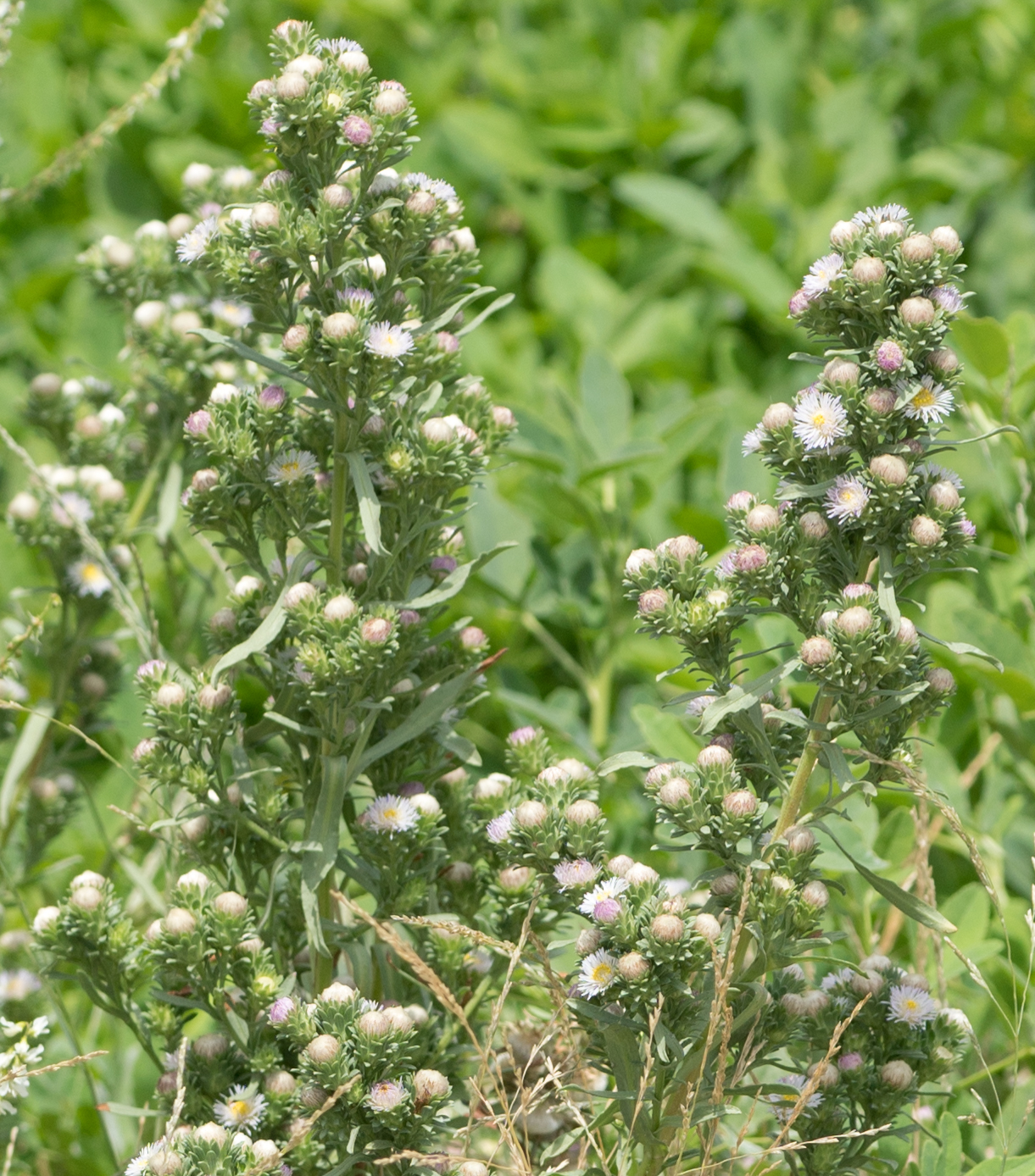
Symphyotrichum frondosum

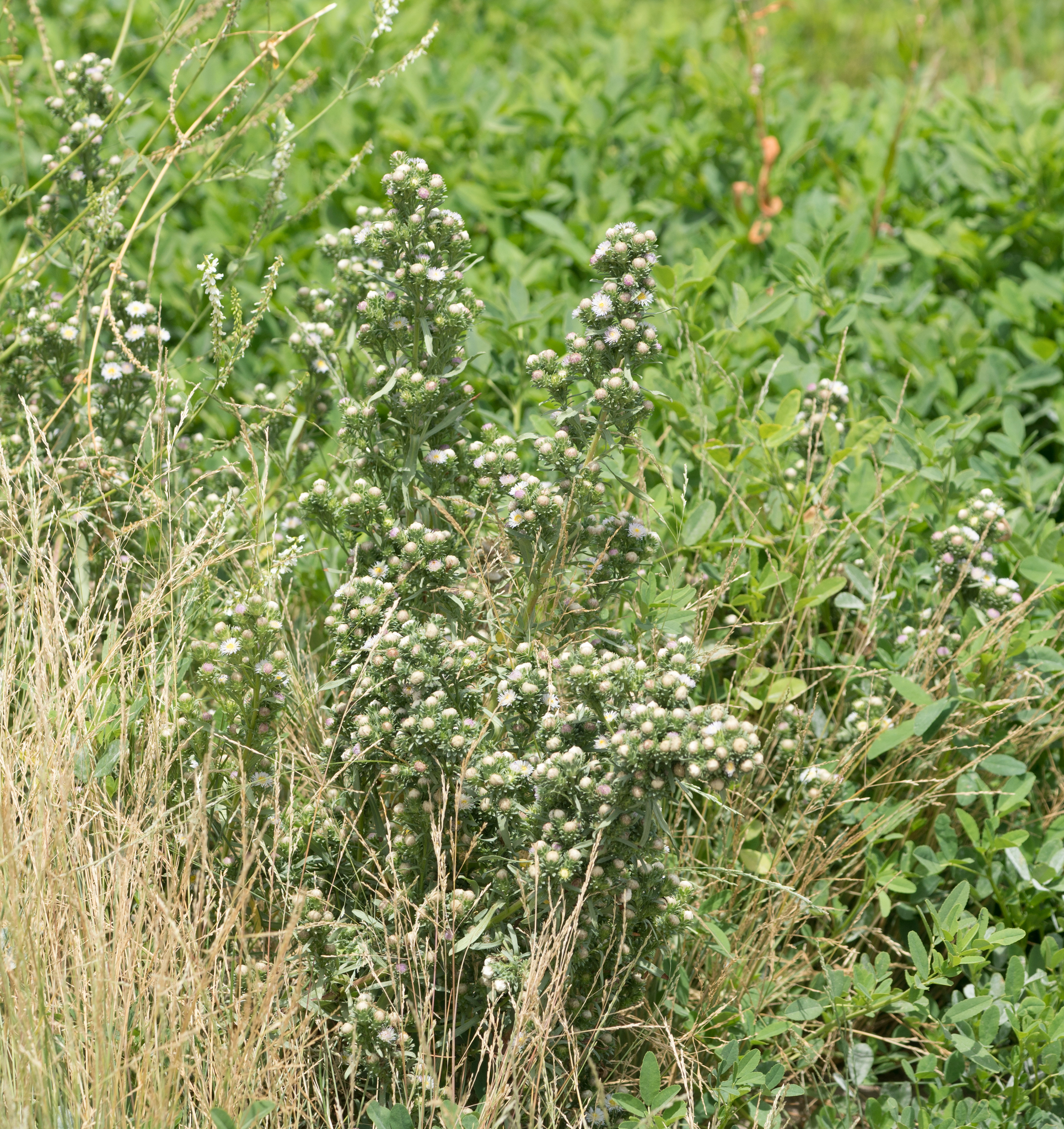
Symphyotrichum frondosum

== Distribution and habitat ==
It is native to North America in the west from British Columbia, south to Baja California (Mexico), east to New Mexico, and north to Wyoming and Idaho. Symphyotrichum frondosum grows in wet habitats such as marshes and meadows, especially in alkaline or saline conditions.
