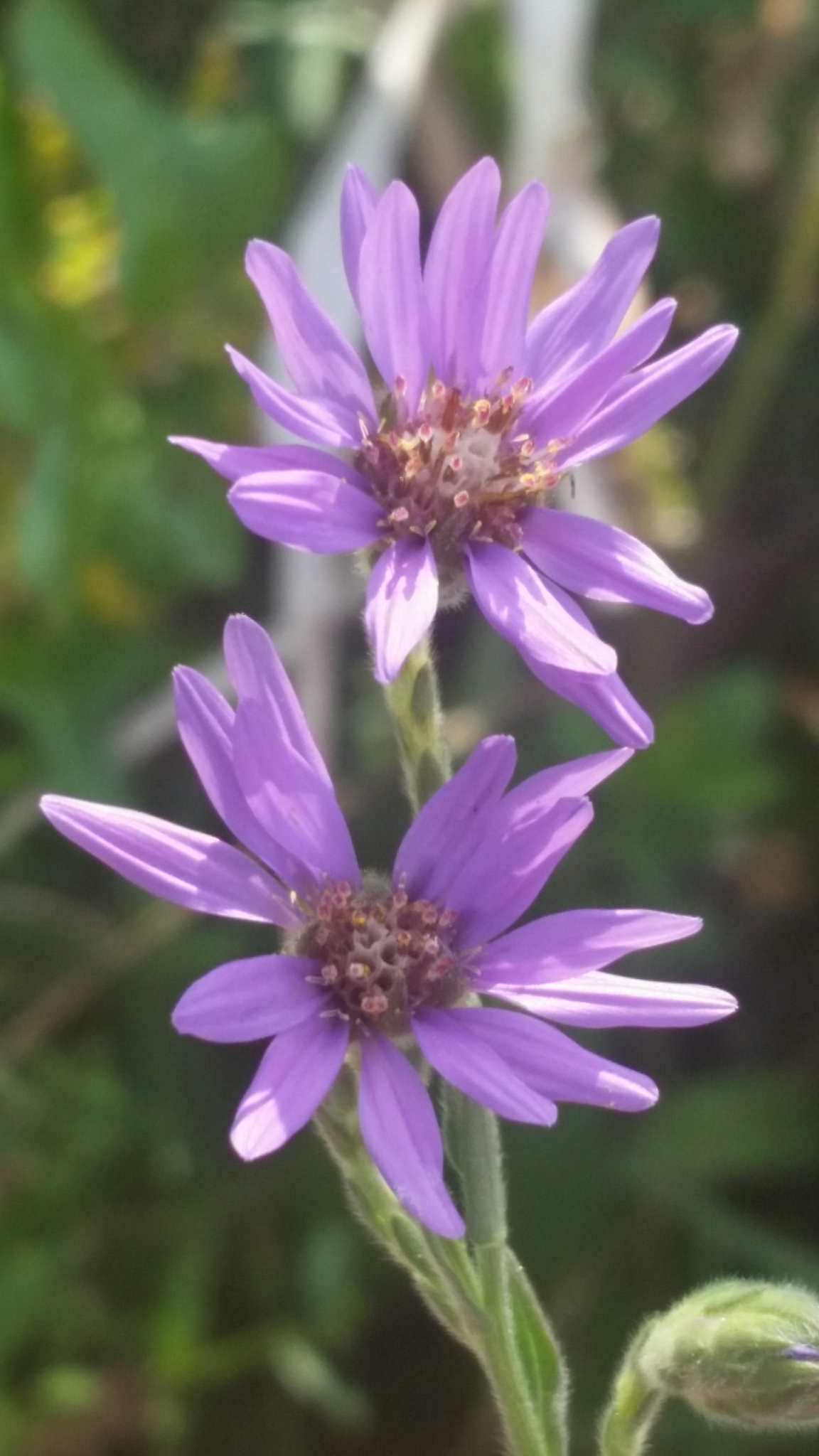
- Southwest Florida

Conservation status
- Secure (NatureServe)

Scientific classification
- Kingdom: Plantae
- Clade: Tracheophytes
- Clade: Angiosperms
- Clade: Eudicots
- Clade: Asterids
- Order: Asterales
- Family: Asteraceae
- Genus: Symphyotrichum
- Subgenus: Symphyotrichum subg. Virgulus
- Species: S. concolor

Binomial name
- Symphyotrichum concolor (L.) G.L.Nesom

Varieties
- S. concolor var. concolor; S. concolor var. devestitum (S.F.Blake) Semple
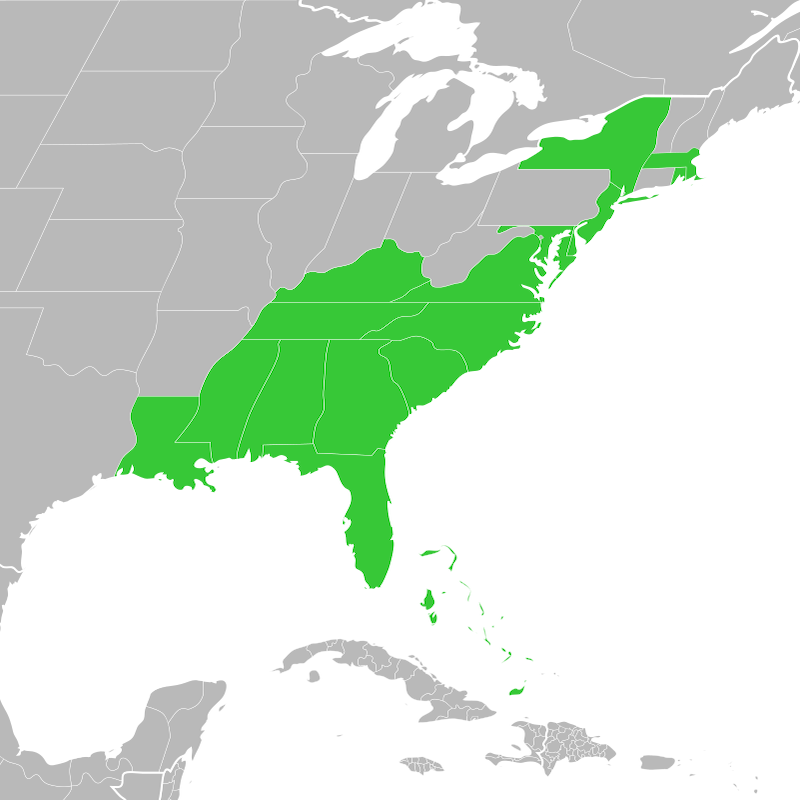
- Native distribution

Synonyms
- Basionym: Aster concolor L.; Others: Lasallea concolor (L.) Semple & Brouillet; Virgulus concolor (L.) Reveal & Keener; Variety synonyms: var. concolor; Aster concolor f. lasiocaulis Fernald; Aster concolor var. simulatus (Small) R.W.Long; Aster simulatus Small; Virgaria concolor Raf. ex DC.; var. devestitum; Aster concolor var. devestitus S.F.Blake; Symphyotrichum concolor subsp. devestitum (S.F.Blake) A.Haines

= Symphyotrichum concolor =

Species of plant in the aster family

Symphyotrichum concolor (formerly Aster concolor) is a species of flowering plant in the family Asteraceae with the common name eastern silvery aster. It is a perennial, herbaceous plant that may reach 30 to 80 centimeters (12 to 31 inches) in height. Leaves are a grayish-green and have a silky look and feel. The flowers have 8–12 rose-purple, rarely white, ray florets, and pink then purple disk florets. It is native to the Atlantic coastal plain and Piedmont areas of the eastern United States, as well as the Bahamas.

== Description ==
Symphyotrichum concolor is a perennial, herbaceous flowering plant that may reach 30 to 80 centimeters (12 to 31 inches) in height. Leaves are a grayish-green and have a silky look and feel. The flowers have 8–12 rose-purple, rarely white, ray florets, and pink then purple disk florets.

== Distribution and habitat ==
The species is native to the Atlantic coastal plain and Piedmont areas of the eastern United States, as well as the Bahamas. It has been found in scrub, flatwoods, fields, and on roadsides at elevations up to 600 meters (1,970 feet).

== Conservation ==
As of October 2024, NatureServe lists Symphyotrichum concolor as Secure (G5) worldwide with notation that the global status was last reviewed in 2021. Some North American province and state statuses are as follows: Possibly Extirpated (SH) in Delaware, and Critically Imperiled (S1) in Maryland and New York.
