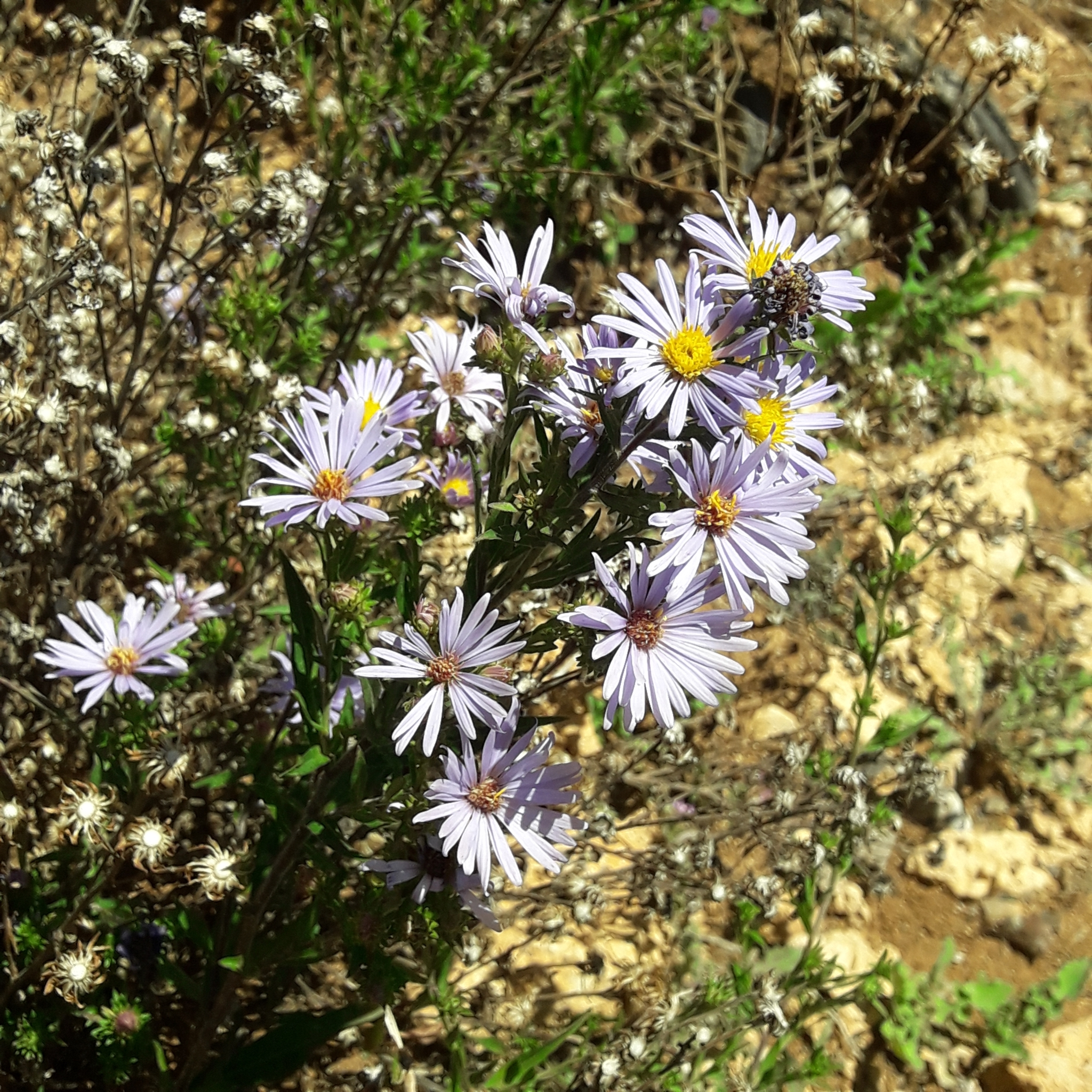
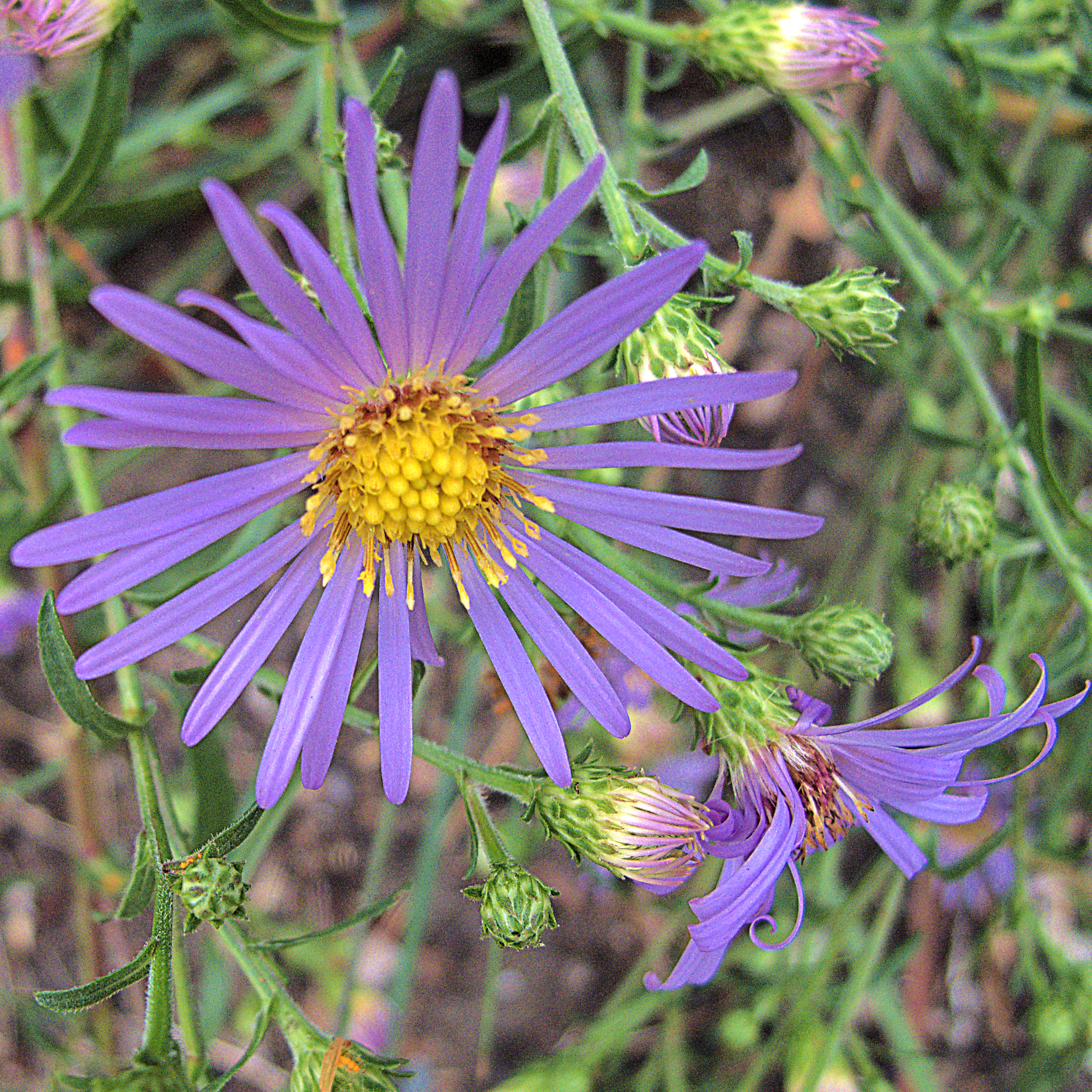
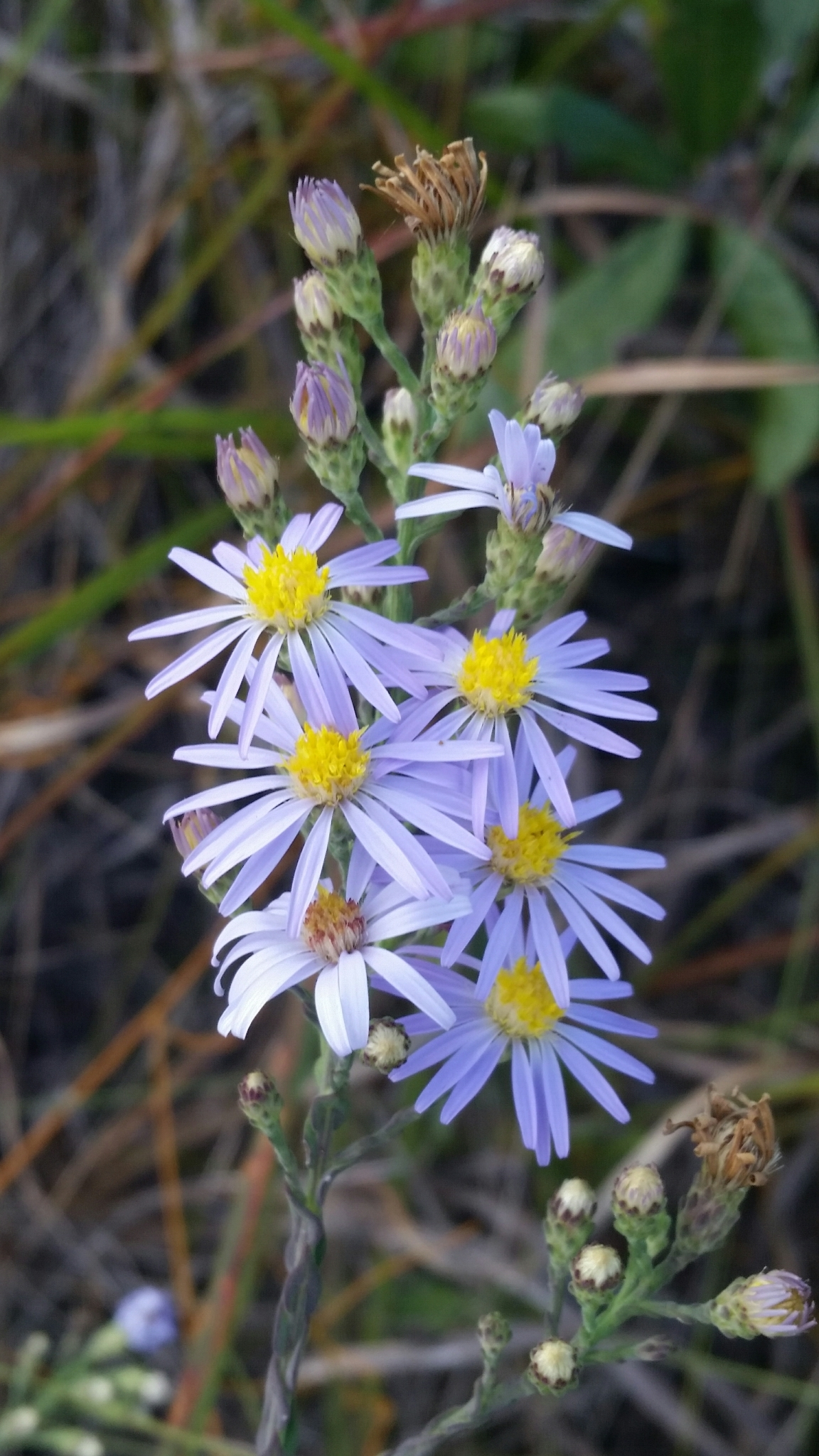
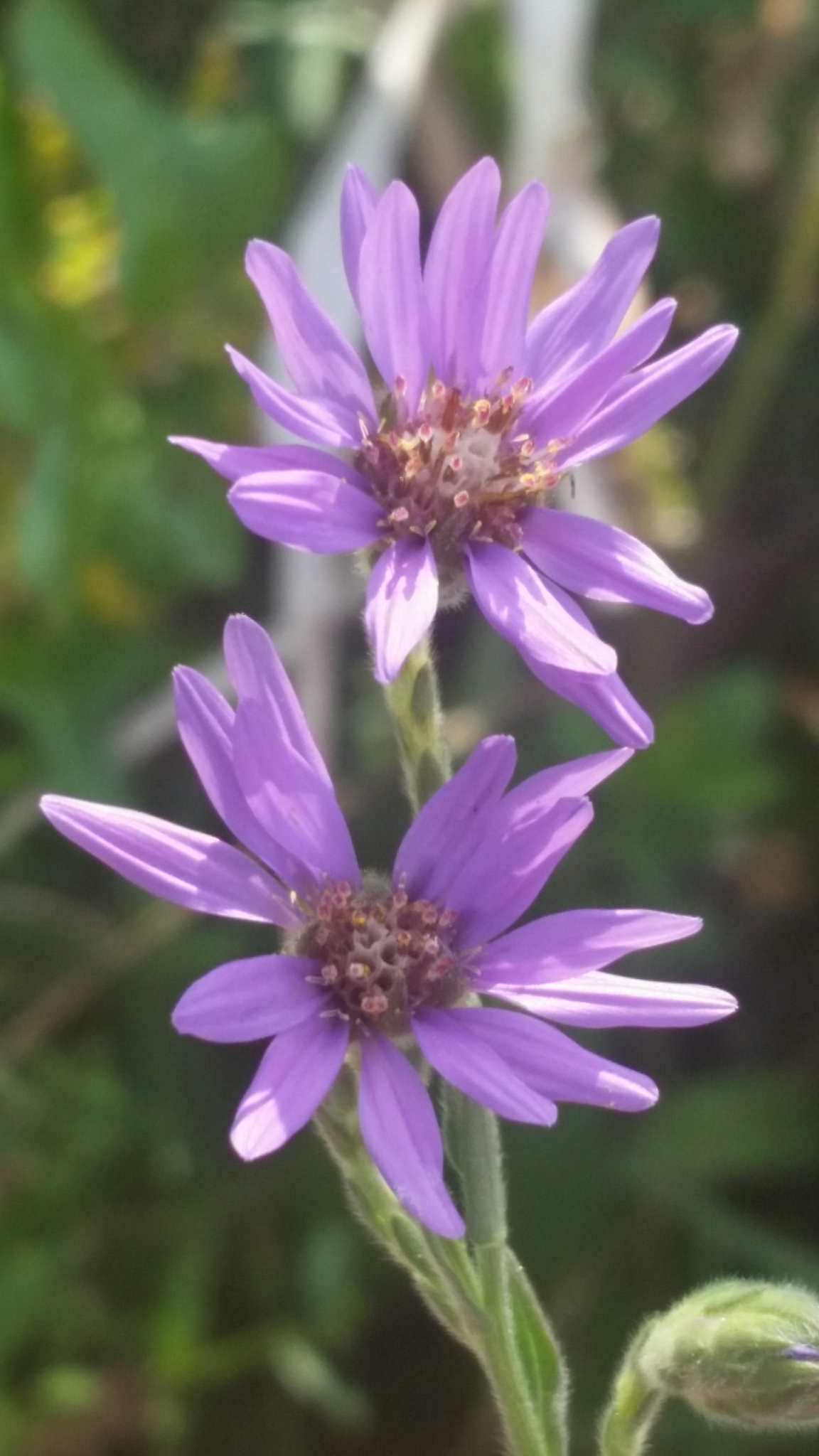
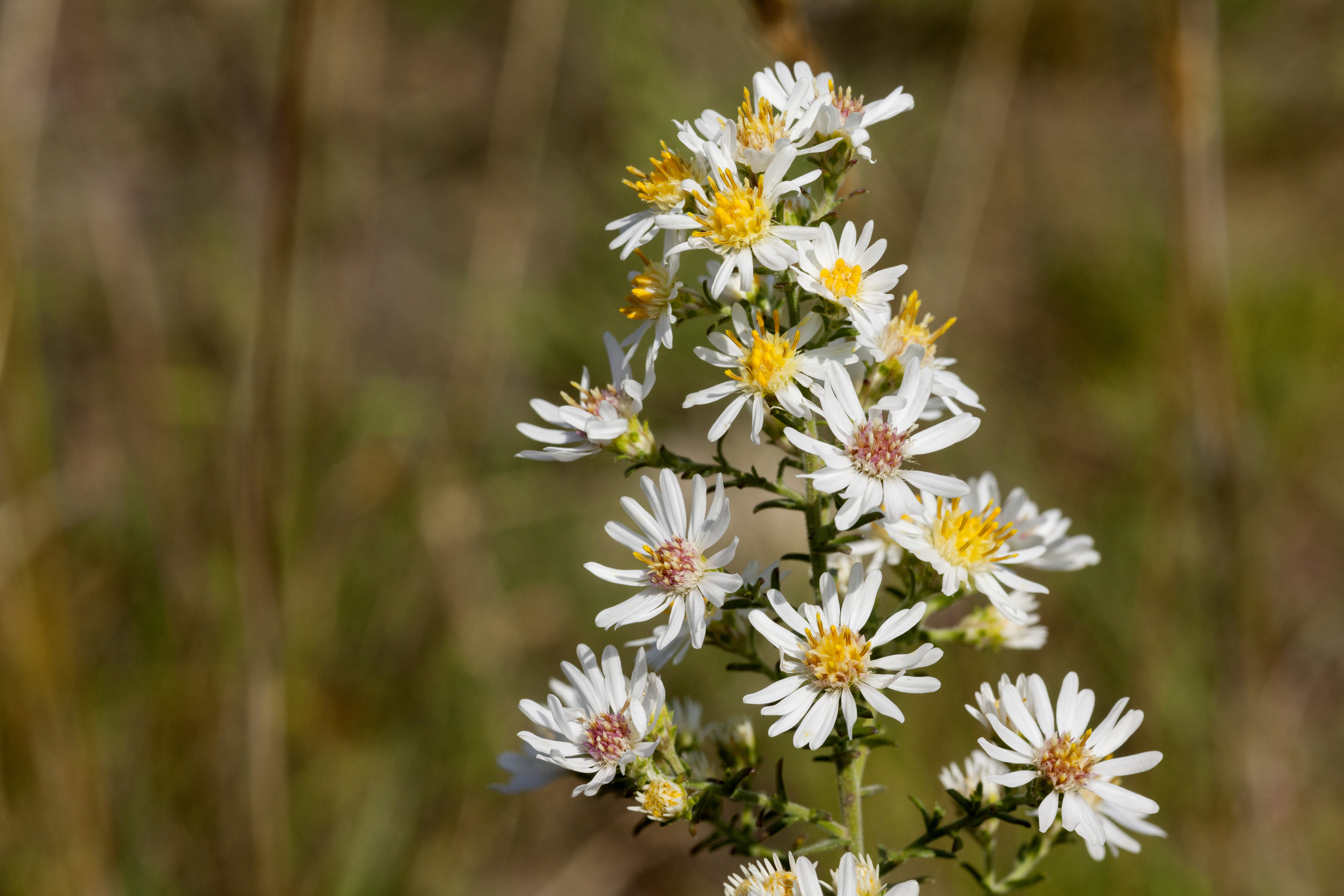
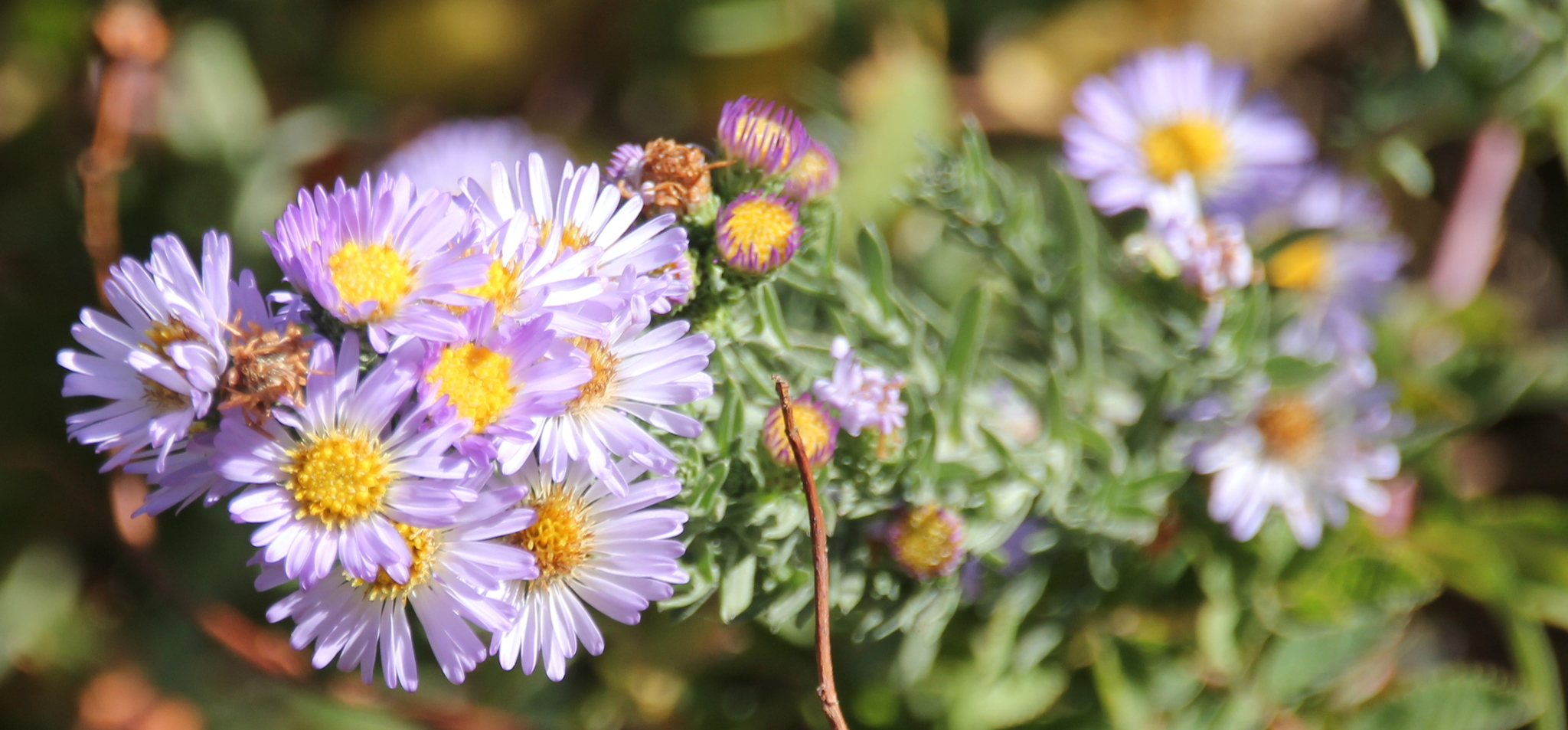
- Symphyotrichum species left–right, top–bottom: S. carnerosanum, S. chilense, S. adnatum, S. concolor, S. ericoides, S. defoliatum.

Scientific classification
- Kingdom: Plantae
- Clade: Tracheophytes
- Clade: Angiosperms
- Clade: Eudicots
- Clade: Asterids
- Order: Asterales
- Family: Asteraceae
- Subfamily: Asteroideae
- Tribe: Astereae
- Subtribe: Symphyotrichinae
- Genus: Symphyotrichum; Nees

Type species
- Symphyotrichum unctuosum Nees

Species
- See List of Symphyotrichum species.

Synonyms
- Synonyms (17): Aglotoma Raf.; Anactis Raf.; Bindera Raf.; Brachyactis Ledeb.; Conyzanthus Tamamsch.; Diplactis Raf.; Fimbristima Raf.; Lasallea Greene; Leiachenis Raf.; Mesoligus Raf.; Myctanthes Raf.; Thinobia Phil.; Venatris Raf.; Virgaria Raf. ex DC.; Virgulaster Semple; Virgulus Raf.; Xalkitis Raf.

= Symphyotrichum =

Genus of flowering plants in the aster family

Symphyotrichum (/ˌsɪmfaɪəˈtrɪkəm/) is a genus of over 100 species and naturally occurring hybrids of herbaceous annual and perennial plants in the composite family, Asteraceae, most which were formerly treated within the genus Aster. The majority are endemic to North America, but several also occur in the West Indies, Central and South America, as well as one species in eastern Eurasia. Several species have been introduced to Europe as garden specimens, most notably New England aster (Symphyotrichum novae-angliae) and New York aster (Symphyotrichum novi-belgii).

== Description ==
Brouillet, et al. wrote:

Taxonomy of Symphyotrichum is difficult. Species are usually heterophyllous, some strongly so. Individuals in the spring, with basal rosettes, often have leaf shapes quite different from those with cauline leaves seen later in the season. Phyllary shape on first- and later-formed heads may differ. Individuals may vary considerably in plant size and array development depending upon growing conditions. The genetic diversity within each species also appears considerable.

For all species in the genus, the ray florets are white, pink, blue, or purple. Disc florets are yellow to white, becoming pinkish, reddish purple, or brown when mature. There are 5 lobes on the disc florets of all species in the genus.

== Taxonomy ==
German botanist Christian Gottfried Daniel Nees von Esenbeck established this genus in 1833 because he thought that a plant he examined, now believed to be a cultivated variety of New York aster (Symphyotrichum novi-belgii), which he called Symphyotrichum unctuosum, was sufficiently distinct from the rest of the genus Aster to warrant its own genus. Nees emphasized the uniqueness of this plant in having its pappus hairs arranged in a coherent, basal ring. This structure is likely the basis for the scientific name of this genus, which derives from the Greek συμφύω (sumphúō), meaning "unite", and θρίξ, τριχός (thríx, trikhós), meaning "hair". However, this characteristic ring is not generally shared by most New York aster pappi, nor is it characteristic of any other plants included in the modern concept of Symphyotrichum. Regardless, according to the rules of the International Code of Nomenclature for algae, fungi, and plants (ICN), the timing of the genus' establishment gives it precedence over other names. The genus was resurrected in 1994 by American botanist Guy L. Nesom to group together species formerly included in the genus Aster in order to make modern genera monophyletic.

=== Subdivisions ===
Symphyotrichum has been divided into five subgenera:

==== Subgenus Ascendentes ====
This subgenus includes two species from the western United States and Canada that originated as hybrids between species in the subgenera Symphyotrichum and Virgulus.

==== Subgenus Astropolium ====
This subgenus includes about 10 species found across the Americas in salt marshes and salt flats.

==== Subgenus Chapmaniana ====
This subgenus includes a single species, S. chapmanii, found in Alabama and Florida, Georgia & likely TN.

==== Subgenus Symphyotrichum ====
This subgenus includes about 65 species occurring across North America, including a few species in Central America and the Caribbean, with one species also occurring in Eurasia.

==== Subgenus Virgulus ====
This subgenus includes about 28 species occurring across North America, including a few species in Central America and the Caribbean.

== Distribution ==
As a whole, Symphyotrichum is native throughout the Americas, with one species, S. ciliatum, also native to eastern Eurasia. Several species have been introduced to Europe and other parts of the world. Most species are native to Mexico, the United States, and Canada, with several species occurring in the West Indies and Central America. Most members of subgenus Astropolium are restricted to South America.

== Species ==
As of June 2021, Catalogue of Life listed 106 accepted species and identified naturally occurring hybrids, including the following:

- Symphyotrichum ascendens (Lindl.) G.L.Nesom – western aster, longleaf aster, intermountain aster
- Symphyotrichum campestre (Nutt.) G.L.Nesom – western meadow aster
- Symphyotrichum chilense (Nees) G.L.Nesom – Pacific aster, common California aster
- Symphyotrichum cordifolium (L.) G.L.Nesom – heartleaf aster, common blue wood aster
- Symphyotrichum defoliatum (Parish) G.L.Nesom – San Bernardino aster
- Symphyotrichum depauperatum (Fernald) G.L.Nesom – serpentine aster
- Symphyotrichum dumosum (L.) G.L.Nesom – bushy aster, rice-button aster,
- Symphyotrichum eatonii (A.Gray) G.L.Nesom – Eaton's aster
- Symphyotrichum ericoides (L.) G.L.Nesom – white aster, heath aster
- Symphyotrichum falcatum (Lindl.) G.L.Nesom – white prairie aster, falcate aster, western heath aster
- Symphyotrichum frondosum (Nutt.) G.L.Nesom – short-rayed alkali aster
- Symphyotrichum georgianum (Alexander) G.L.Nesom – Georgia aster
- Symphyotrichum greatae (Parish) G.L.Nesom – Greata's aster
- Symphyotrichum hallii (A.Gray) G.L.Nesom – Hall's aster
- Symphyotrichum laeve (L.) Á.Löve & D.Löve – smooth aster, smooth leaved aster, glaucous aster
- Symphyotrichum lanceolatum (Willd.) G.L.Nesom – panicled aster, tall white aster
- Symphyotrichum lateriflorum (L.) Á.Löve & D.Löve – calico aster
- Symphyotrichum lentum (Greene) G.L.Nesom – Suisun Marsh aster
- Symphyotrichum novae-angliae (L.) G.L.Nesom – New England aster
- Symphyotrichum novi-belgii (L.) G.L.Nesom – New York aster
- Symphyotrichum oblongifolium (Nutt.) G.L.Nesom – aromatic aster
- Symphyotrichum oolentangiense (Riddell) G.L.Nesom – sky-blue aster, azure aster
- Symphyotrichum pilosum (Willd.) G.L.Nesom – hairy aster, frost aster
- Symphyotrichum prenanthoides (Muhl. ex Willd.) G.L.Nesom – crooked-stem aster
- Symphyotrichum puniceum (L.) Á.Löve & D.Löve – purplestem aster, red-stemmed aster, swamp aster
- Symphyotrichum sericeum (Vent.) G.L.Nesom – western silver aster, silky aster
- Symphyotrichum shortii (Lindl.) G.L.Nesom – Short's aster
- Symphyotrichum subulatum (Michx.) G.L.Nesom – eastern annual saltmarsh aster

== Reproduction ==
Diagram of ray floret
1. corolla
2. style
3. stigma
4. calyx
5. ovary

Diagram of disk floret
1. stigma
2. style
3. anthers
4. corolla
5. calyx
6. ovary

Ray florets in the Symphyotrichum genus are exclusively female, each having a pistil (with style, stigma, and ovary) but no stamen. Ray florets accept pollen and each can develop a seed, but they produce no pollen.

Each ray floret has a strap-shaped corolla (or ligule) formed from three vestigial petals which are fused together. The floret contains one inferior ovary, and this ovary contains one ovule. (Note: Asteraceae ovaries are called inferior because the floral parts attach above the ovary. See also Asteraceae § Floral structures and Gynoecium.) The ovary has an attached style that extends outward from between the ray floret corolla and the rest of the flower head. As the ray floret is blooming, the stigma at the top of the style splits into two lobes.

Disk florets in the Symphyotrichum genus are androgynous, each with both male (stamen, anthers, and filaments) and female reproductive parts; thus, a disk floret produces pollen and can develop a seed. The disk floret has five petals, sometimes referred to as lobes, which are fused into its own corolla in the shape of a tube.

The male stamen is inside the tube-shaped corolla of the disk floret. It has five anthers, five filaments, and produces pollen. The anthers and filaments are readily visible as separate entities in non-Asteraceae species. Here, they are fused together to form a cylinder, or tube, with their pollen on the inside only. This male anther cylinder surrounds the female style and stigma. As the style is maturing, it elongates up through the anther cylinder, gathering the pollen on its stigma along the way.

The ovary is at the bottom of the disk floret style. As with the ray floret, the disk floret stigma has two lobes that are fused together. The disk floret's stigma stays closed while pollen is on it, keeping its ovary safe from self-pollination. After the pollen has been collected and carried off by one or more pollinators, the stigma begins to split into two lobes, opening the style so that the disk floret ovary becomes accessible to receive pollen from another plant.
