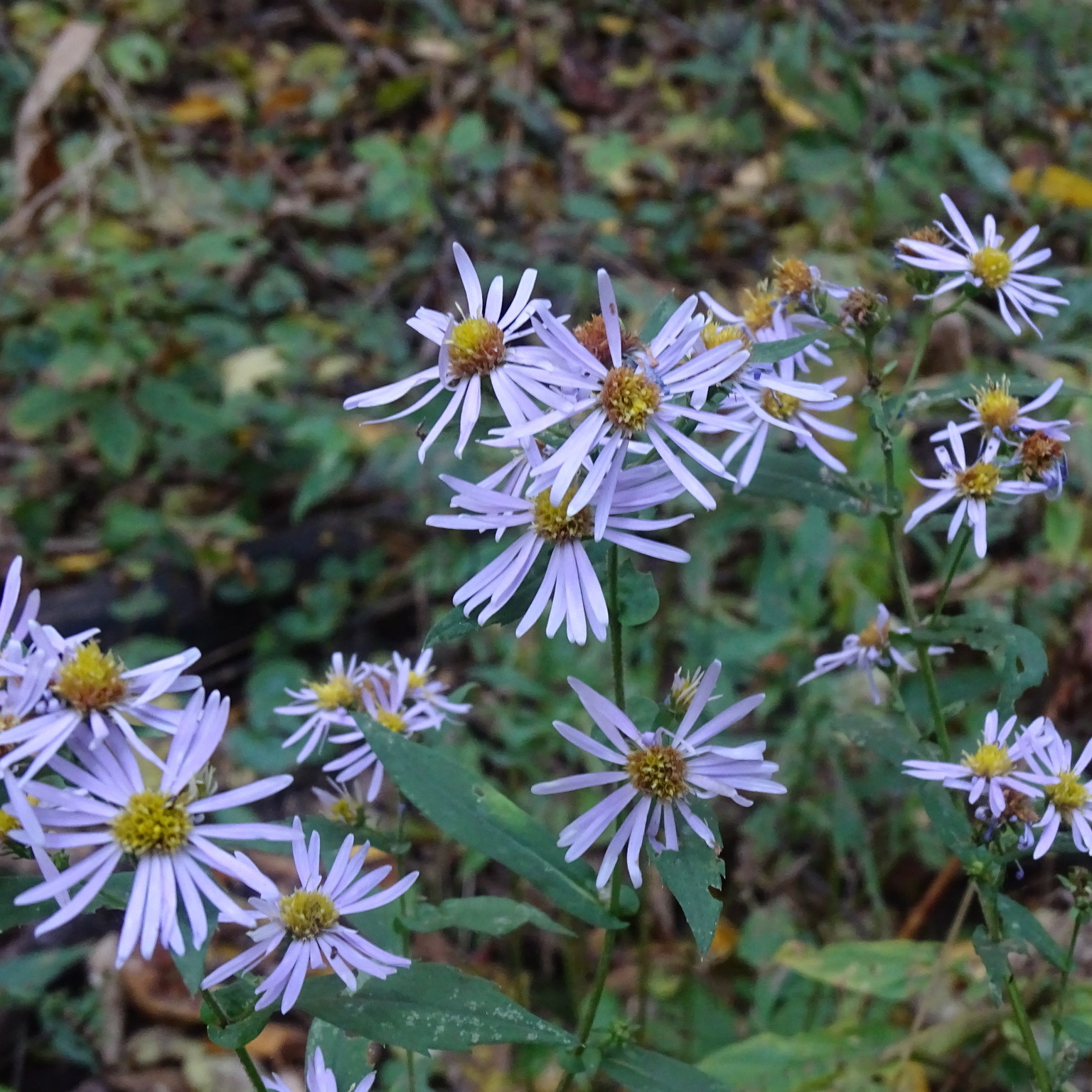

Conservation status
- Apparently Secure (NatureServe)

Scientific classification
- Kingdom: Plantae
- Clade: Tracheophytes
- Clade: Angiosperms
- Clade: Eudicots
- Clade: Asterids
- Order: Asterales
- Family: Asteraceae
- Tribe: Astereae
- Subtribe: Symphyotrichinae
- Genus: Symphyotrichum
- Subgenus: Symphyotrichum subg. Symphyotrichum
- Section: Symphyotrichum sect. Symphyotrichum
- Species: S. prenanthoides

Binomial name
- Symphyotrichum prenanthoides (Muhl. ex Willd.) G.L.Nesom
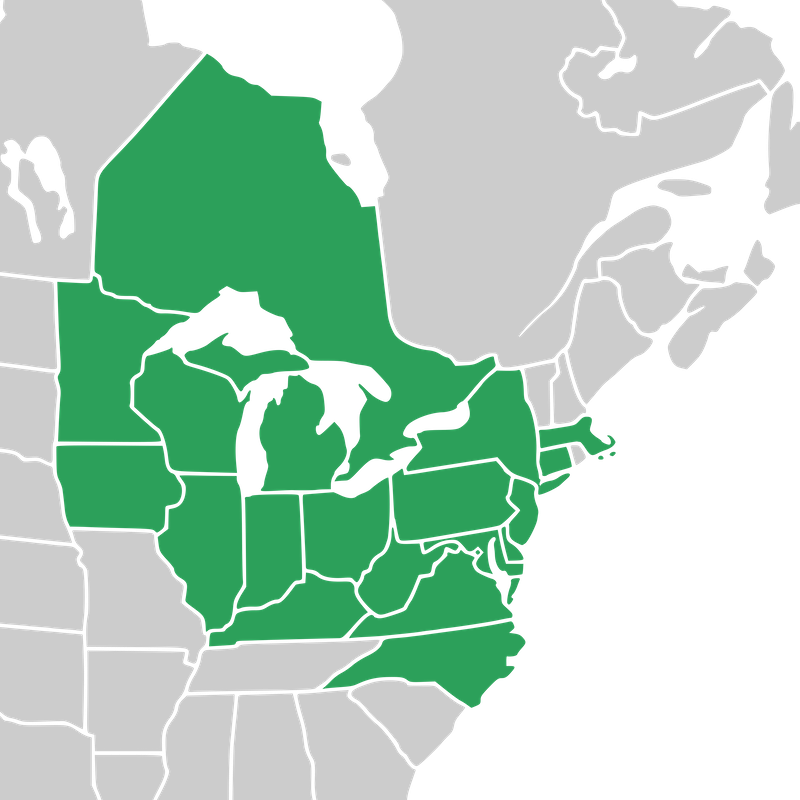
- Native distribution

Synonyms
- Basionym: Aster prenanthoides Muhl. ex Willd.; Alphabetical list: Aster prenanthoides var. diffusifolius Peck; Aster prenanthoides var. longifolius Porter; Aster prenanthoides f. milwaukeensis Benke; Aster prenanthoides var. porrectifolius Porter; Aster prenanthoides var. scaber Torr. & A.Gray

= Symphyotrichum prenanthoides =

Species of plant in the aster family

Symphyotrichum prenanthoides (formerly Aster prenanthoides) is a species of flowering plant in the family Asteraceae known by the common name crookedstem aster. It is native to northcentral and northeastern North America.

This rhizomatous perennial herb produces colonies of plants with stems that may exceed 1 meter (3 feet 3 inches) in length. These stems grow upright to erect and may be crooked or nearly straight, often becoming thick and purple with age. The leaves vary in size and shape. The flower heads are borne in branching arrays on purplish stems. The ray florets are lavender or blue in color, or sometimes white. There are up to 30 ray florets measuring up to 15 millimeters (3/5 inch) in length. At the center are disk florets in shades of cream and yellow to purple or brown.

This plant grows in many habitats, including woody and marshy areas as well as roadsides.

== Conservation ==
It is a special concern species in Connecticut, where it is believed to be extirpated.

== Uses ==
The Iroquois use this plant medicinally to treat fevers in babies and for other ailments.
