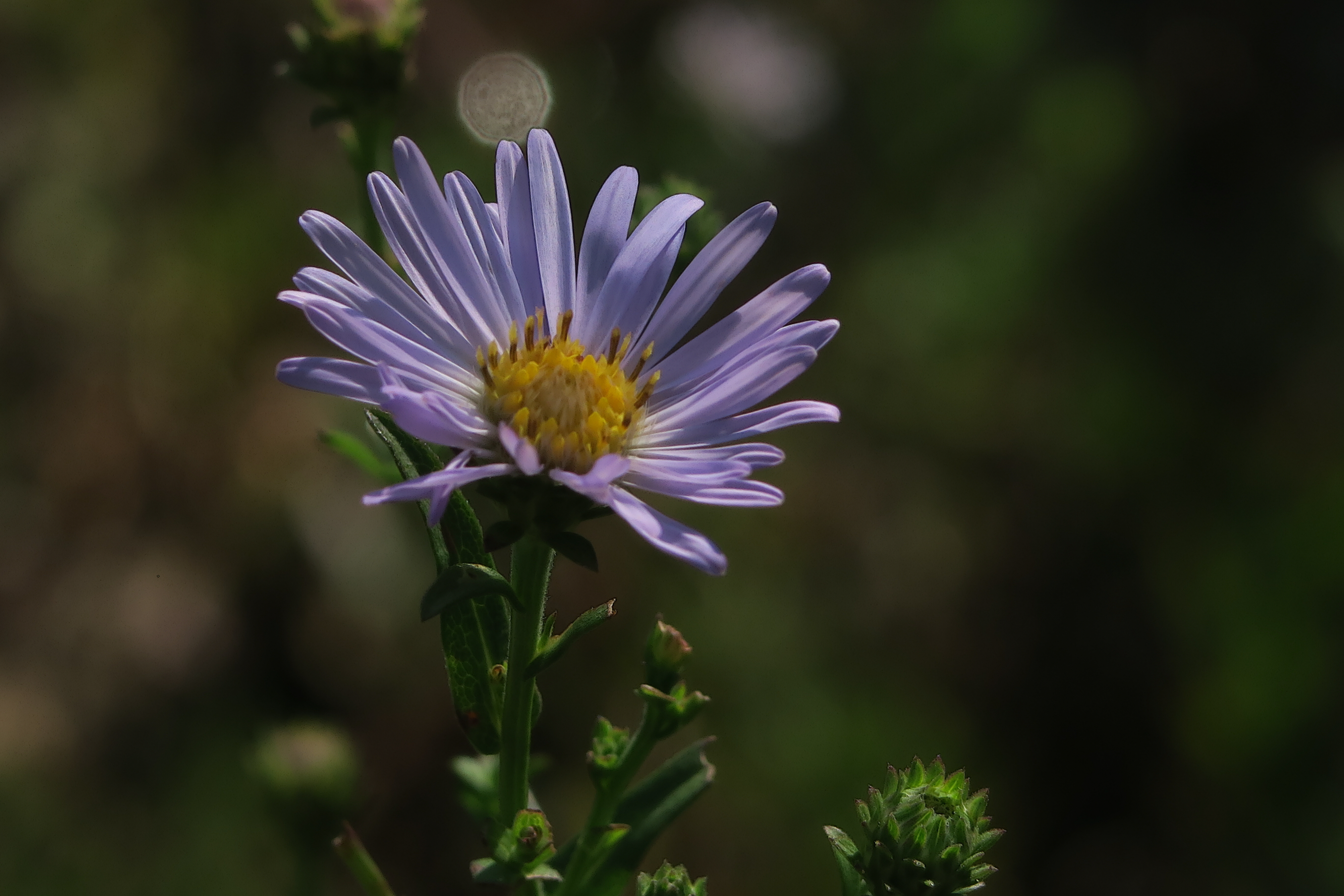

Conservation status
- Imperiled (NatureServe)

Scientific classification
- Kingdom: Plantae
- Clade: Tracheophytes
- Clade: Angiosperms
- Clade: Eudicots
- Clade: Asterids
- Order: Asterales
- Family: Asteraceae
- Tribe: Astereae
- Subtribe: Symphyotrichinae
- Genus: Symphyotrichum
- Subgenus: Symphyotrichum subg. Symphyotrichum
- Section: Symphyotrichum sect. Occidentales
- Species: S. lentum

Binomial name
- Symphyotrichum lentum (Greene) G.L.Nesom
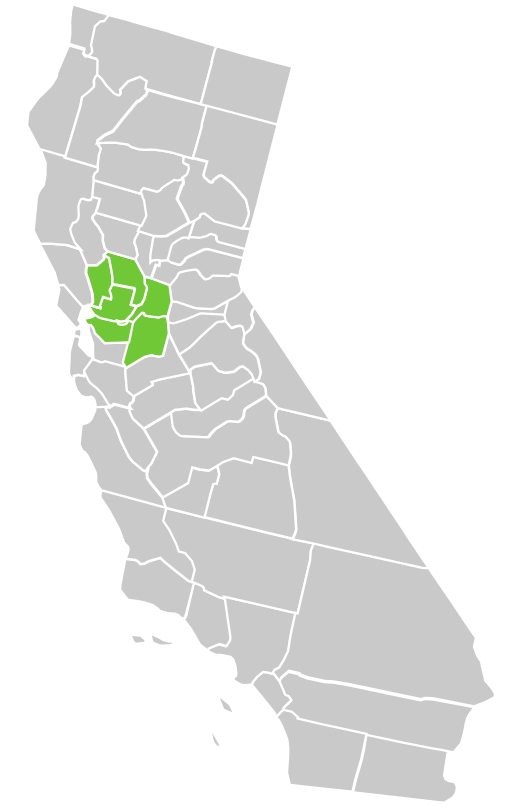
- Symphyotrichum lentum distribution by county in California

Synonyms
- Aster chilensis var. lentus (Greene) Jeps.; Aster lentus Greene

= Symphyotrichum lentum =

Species of plant in the aster family

Symphyotrichum lentum (formerly Aster lentus) is a species of flowering plant in the family Asteraceae with the common name of Suisun Marsh aster. It is a perennial and herbaceous plant endemic to the marshes of Sacramento-San Joaquin River Delta of Northern California.

== Description ==
Symphyotrichum lentum is similar in appearance to Symphyotrichum chilense, which may be found in the same area. It is a colonial perennial herb producing a hairless stem 40 to 200 centimeters (1 1/4 to 6 1/2 feet) tall from a long rhizome. The leaves are linear or lance-shaped, pointed, and up to 15 centimeters (6 inches) long near the base of the plant. The lower leaves wither by the time the plant flowers. The inflorescence is an open array of flower heads with a fringe of violet ray florets around a center of yellow disc florets. The fruit is a hairy cypsela with a long white pappus.

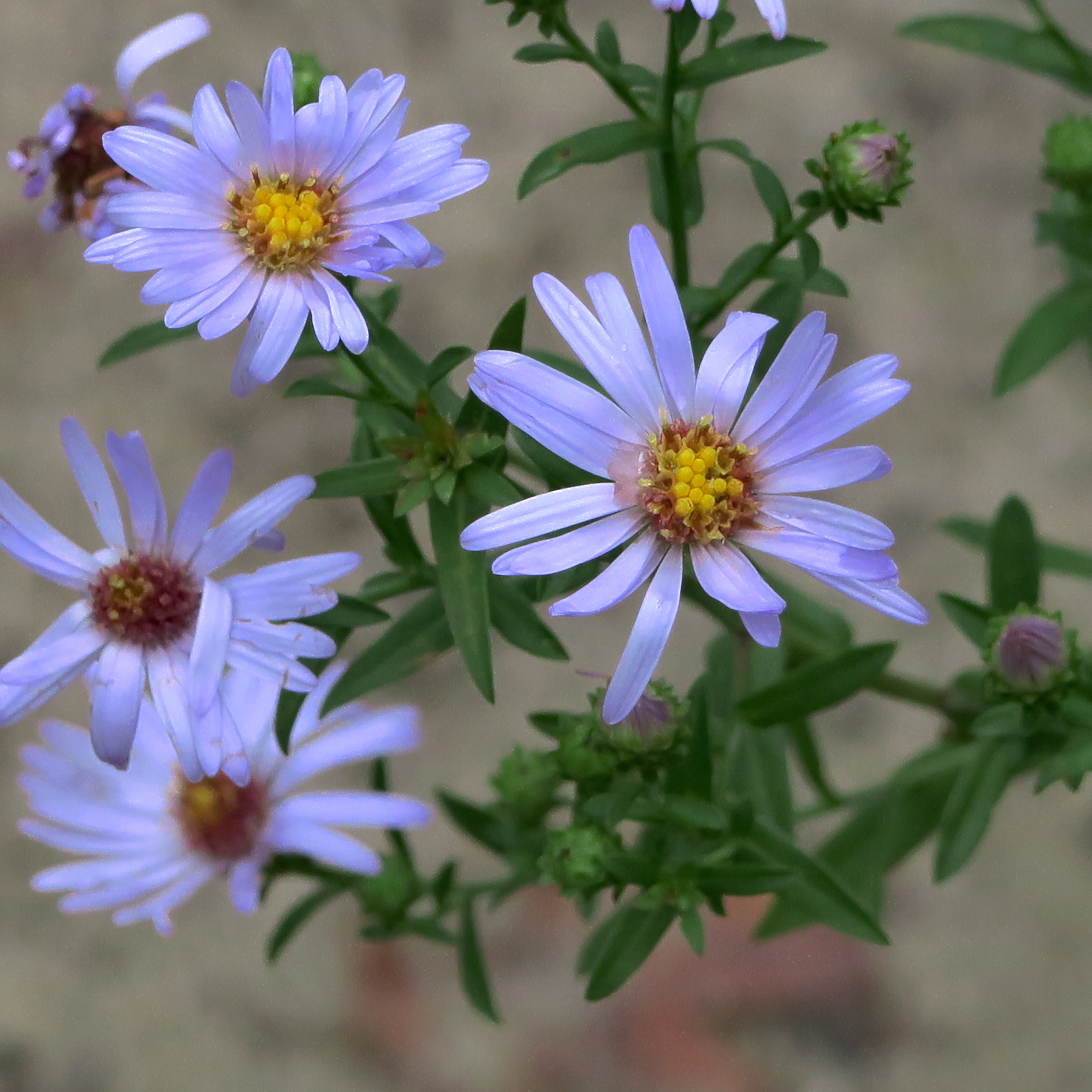
Symphyotrichum lentum

== Distribution and habitat ==
Symphyotrichum lentum is endemic to the salt marshes and wet grasslands of the Sacramento–San Joaquin River Delta in Northern California.

== Conservation ==
NatureServe lists it as Imperiled (G2) worldwide.
