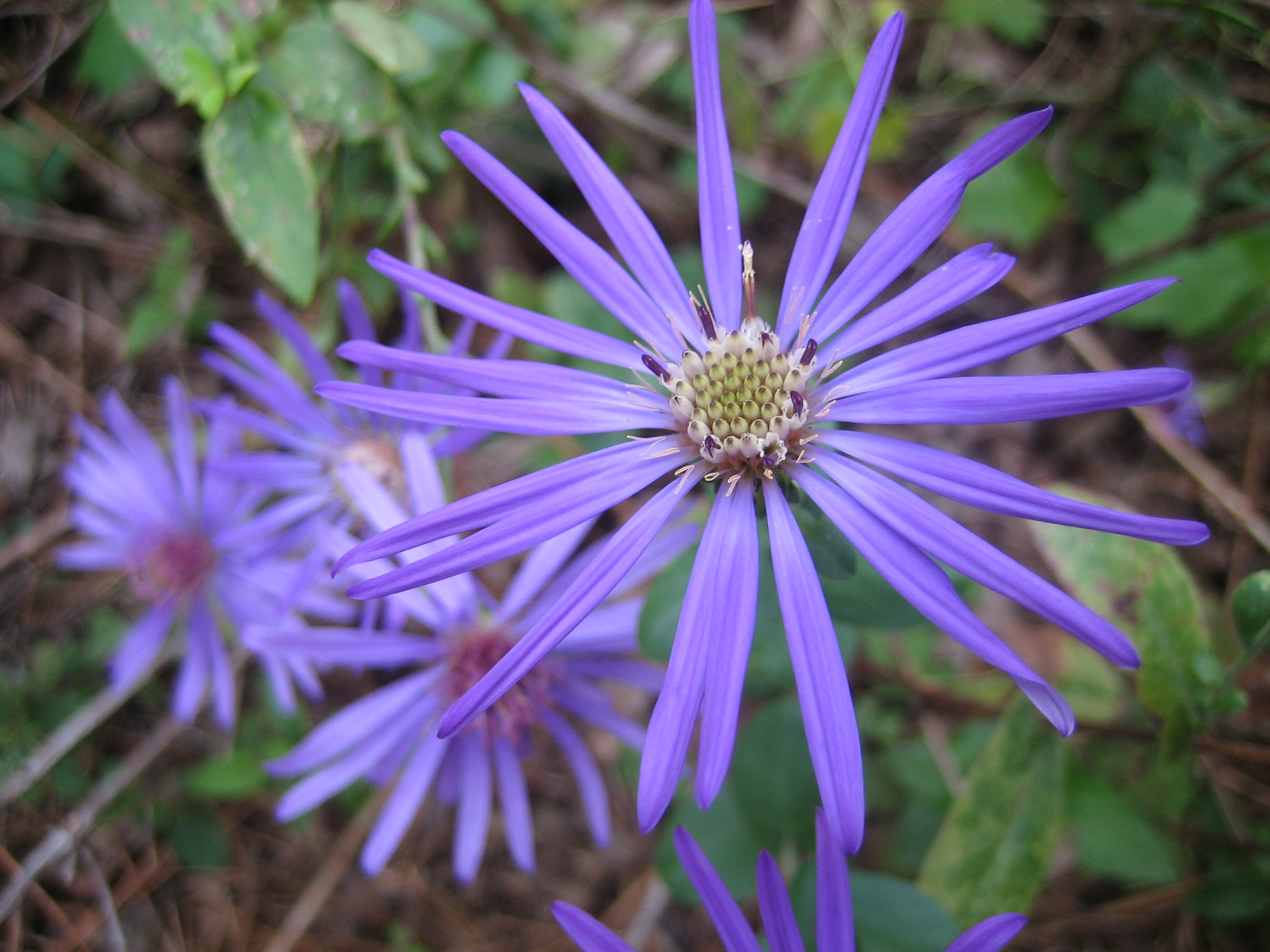
- Flower heads

Conservation status
- Vulnerable (NatureServe)

Scientific classification
- Kingdom: Plantae
- Clade: Tracheophytes
- Clade: Angiosperms
- Clade: Eudicots
- Clade: Asterids
- Order: Asterales
- Family: Asteraceae
- Tribe: Astereae
- Subtribe: Symphyotrichinae
- Genus: Symphyotrichum
- Subgenus: Symphyotrichum subg. Virgulus
- Section: Symphyotrichum sect. Patentes
- Species: S. georgianum

Binomial name
- Symphyotrichum georgianum (Alexander) G.L.Nesom
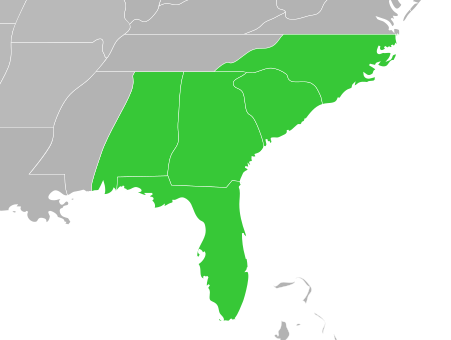
- Native distribution

Synonyms
- Aster georgianus Alexander ex Small; Aster patens var. georgianus (Alexander) Cronquist; Virgulus georgianus (Small) Semple; Virgulus patens var. georgianus (Small) Reveal & Keener

= Symphyotrichum georgianum =

Species of flowering plant in the daisy family

Symphyotrichum georgianum (formerly Aster georgianus) is a rare species of flowering plant in the Asteraceae, the aster family. Its common name is Georgia aster. It is native to the southeastern United States where it is known from Alabama, Florida, Georgia, North Carolina, and South Carolina. As of 2013, it may be extirpated from the state of Florida.

== Description ==
Georgia aster is a robust rhizomatous perennial and herbaceous plant that produces colonies of woody stems up to 1 meter (3 feet 3 inches) tall. The thick, dark green leaves are up to 7 centimeters (2 3/4 inches) long by 2 cm (4/5 in) wide. They are oblong to lance-shaped with smooth or serrated margins. The flower heads are borne on rough-haired peduncles. The bracts are linear to lance-shaped. The stems, leaves, and some parts of the flower heads are covered with tiny glands on tiny stalks called "stipitate glands". The flower heads are relatively large, up to 5–6 cm (2–2 3/8 in) across. Each ray floret is up to 2 cm (4/5 in) long and purple, described as "dark purple" to "lavender violet to dark reddish purple". The disk florets at the center are white to purplish. It blooms in October and November.

== Distribution and habitat ==
Symphyotrichum georgianum is native to the southeastern United States where it is known from Alabama, Florida, Georgia, North Carolina, and South Carolina. As of 2013, it may be extirpated from the state of Florida.

It grows in oak-pine woodlands. Its local region was once covered in a post oak-savanna, and this species was a member of this ecosystem. This type of plant community depends on natural disturbance, such as wildfire, now largely destroyed or degraded by fire suppression and the removal of certain large grazing mammals. Georgia aster is therefore a relict species of this historic ecosystem and grows in remaining woodlands.

== Conservation ==
Threats to the survival of the species include elimination of habitat disturbance such as fire, road construction, and herbicide application. As of 2013, only 146 populations were estimated to remain.

== Gallery ==
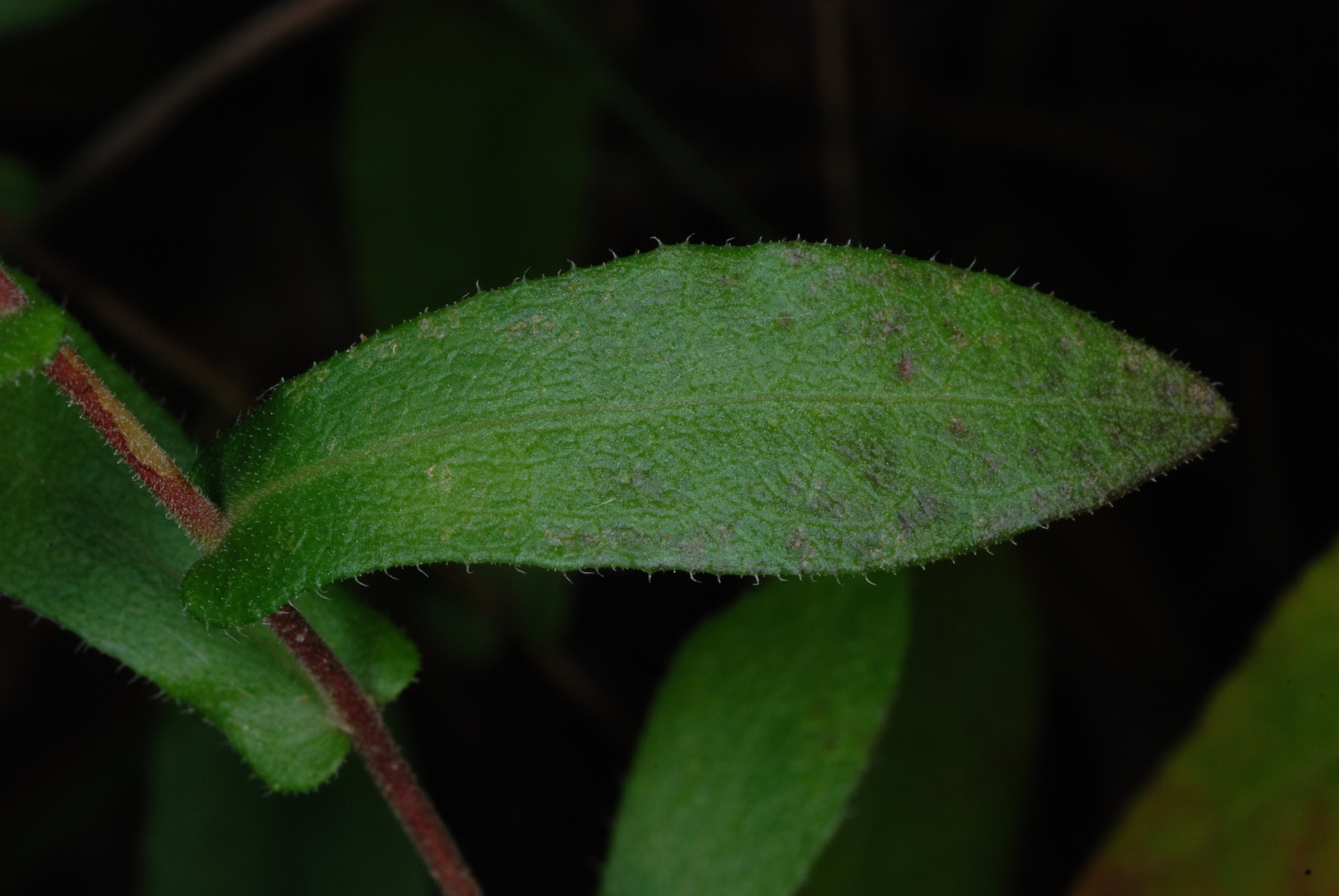
Leaf and stem node

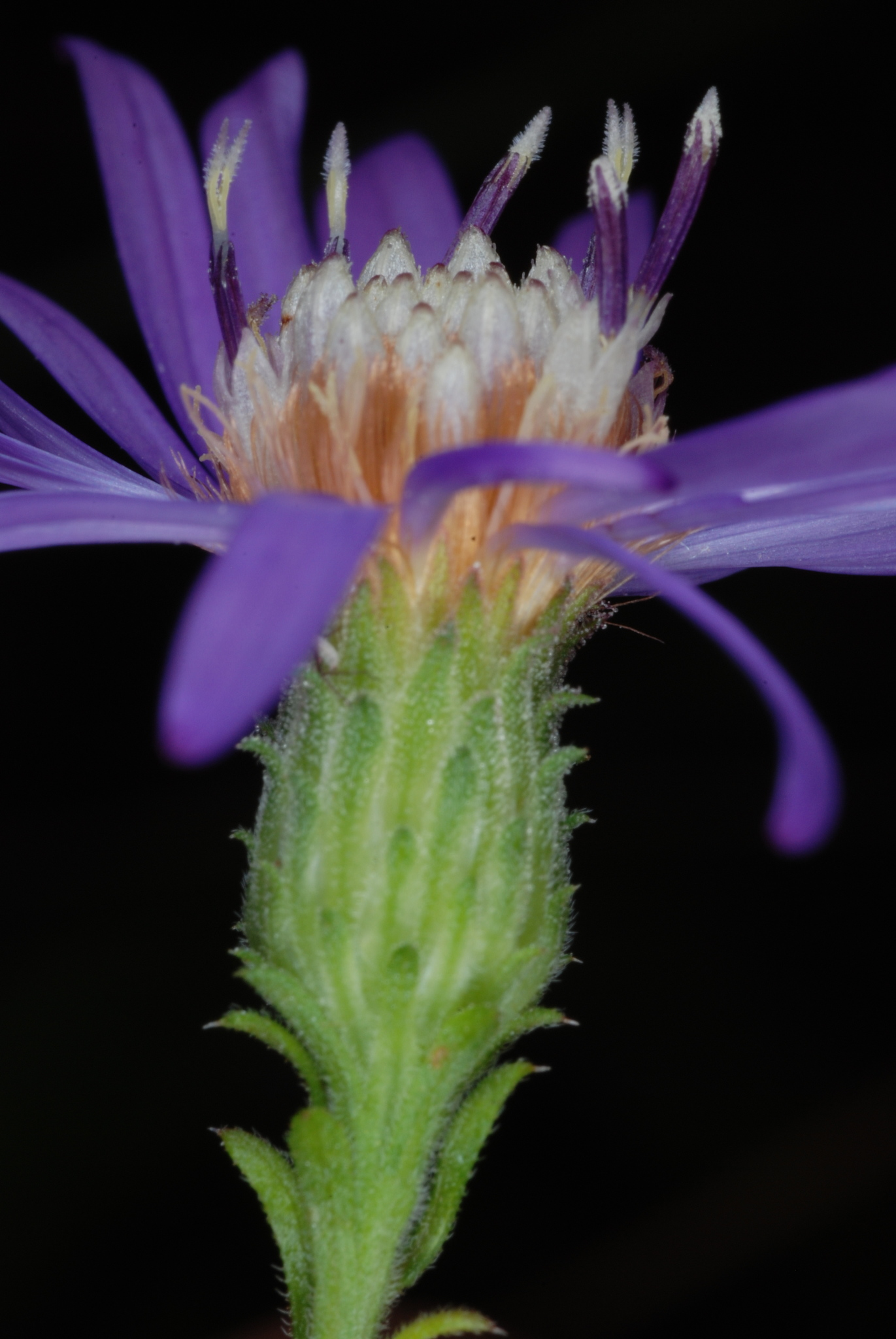
Involucre showing phyllaries and stipitate glands

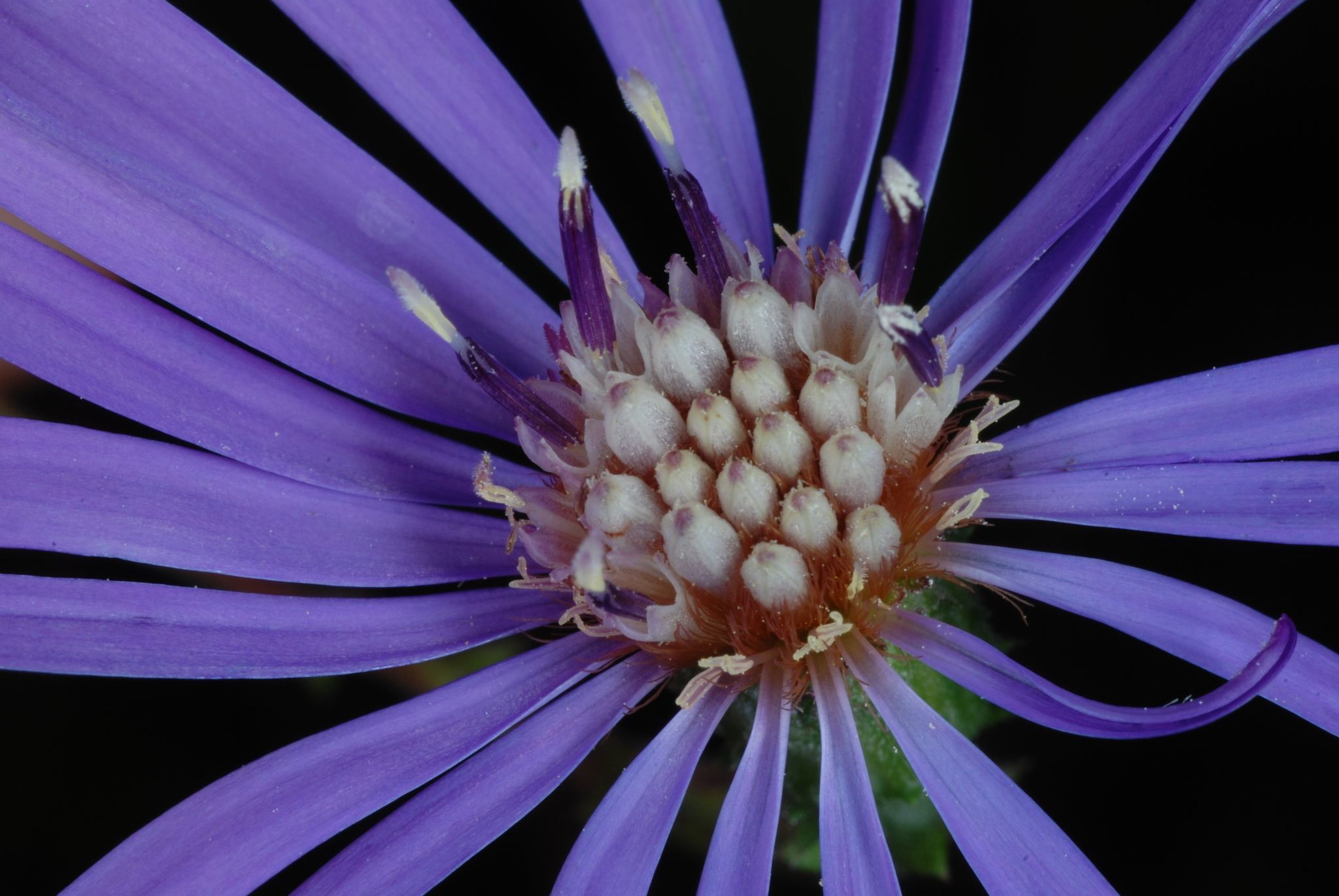
Before pollination

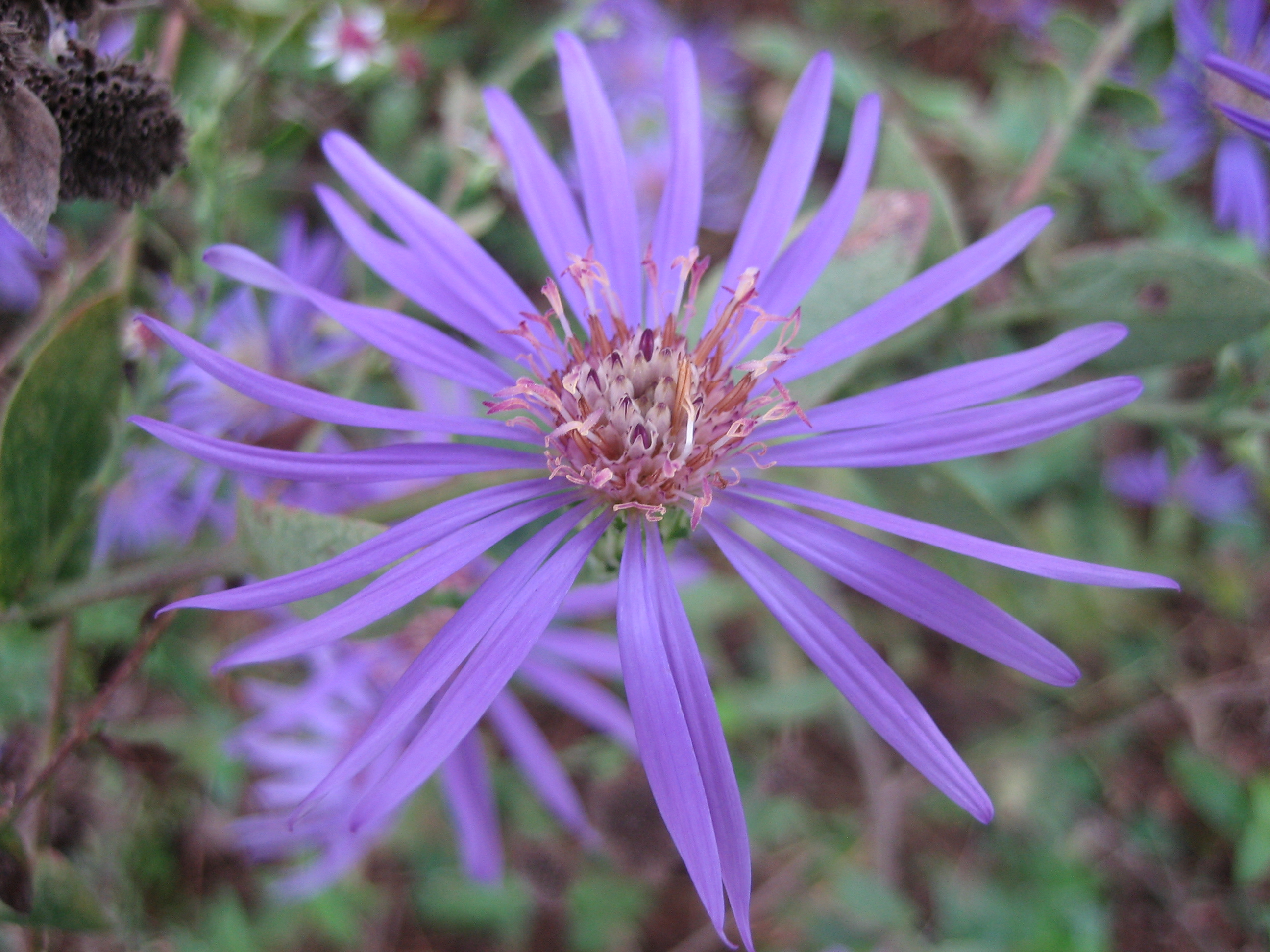
After pollination
