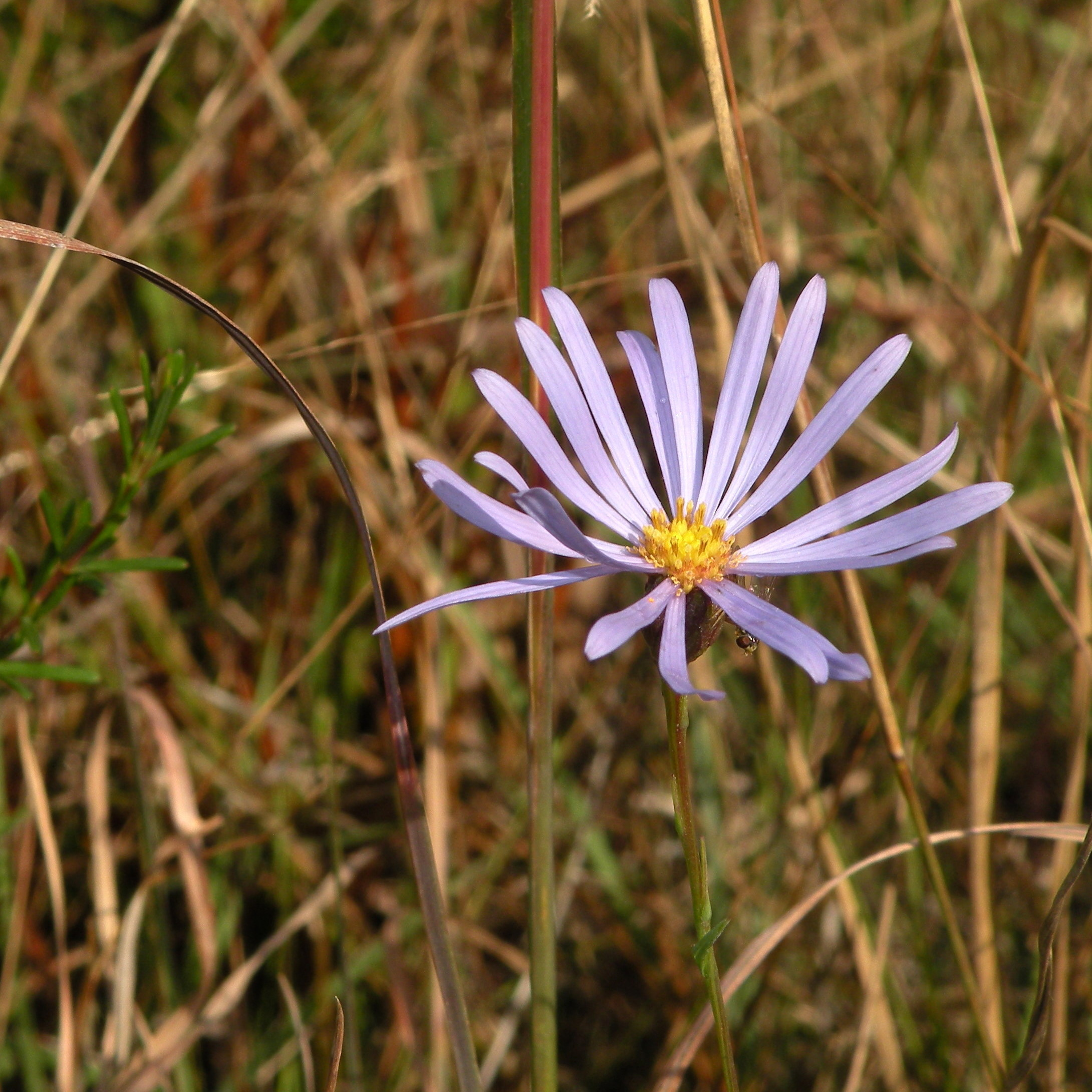
- Symphyotrichum chapmanii, Apalachicola National Forest, Florida

Conservation status
- Imperiled (NatureServe)

Scientific classification
- Kingdom: Plantae
- Clade: Tracheophytes
- Clade: Angiosperms
- Clade: Eudicots
- Clade: Asterids
- Order: Asterales
- Family: Asteraceae
- Tribe: Astereae
- Subtribe: Symphyotrichinae
- Genus: Symphyotrichum
- Subgenus: Symphyotrichum subg. Chapmaniana
- Species: S. chapmanii

Binomial name
- Symphyotrichum chapmanii (Torr. & A.Gray) Semple & Brouillet
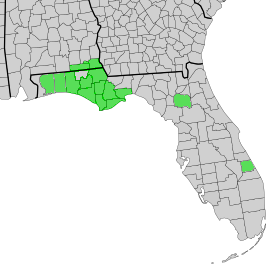
- Native distribution

Synonyms
- Aster chapmanii Torr. & A.Gray; Eurybia chapmanii (Torr. & A.Gray) G.L.Nesom; Heleastrum chapmanii (Torr. & A.Gray) Shinners

= Symphyotrichum chapmanii =

Species of plant in the aster family

Symphyotrichum chapmanii (formerly Aster chapmanii and Eurybia chapmanii) is a species of flowering plant in the family Asteraceae native to the Apalachicola River drainage basin of Alabama and Florida. Commonly known as savanna aster, it is a perennial, herbaceous plant that may reach 30 to 80 centimeters (1 to 2 1/2 feet) tall. Its flowers have purple to blue-lavender ray florets and pale yellow disk florets. It is a wetland species and is of conservation concern. It may be extirpated in Alabama.

== Description ==
Savanna aster is a perennial, herbaceous plant that grows from a cespitose root system with rhizomes. It typically reaches heights 30–80 cm (12–31 in) on one to three hairless stems. It has cylinder-bell shaped involucres with green, purple-tipped phyllaries in 4–6 rows on its involucres. It blooms September–December with flower heads that have 8–23 purple to pale bluish-purple ray florets 10–20 mm (0.4–0.8 in) long surrounding 47–57 pale yellow disk florets.

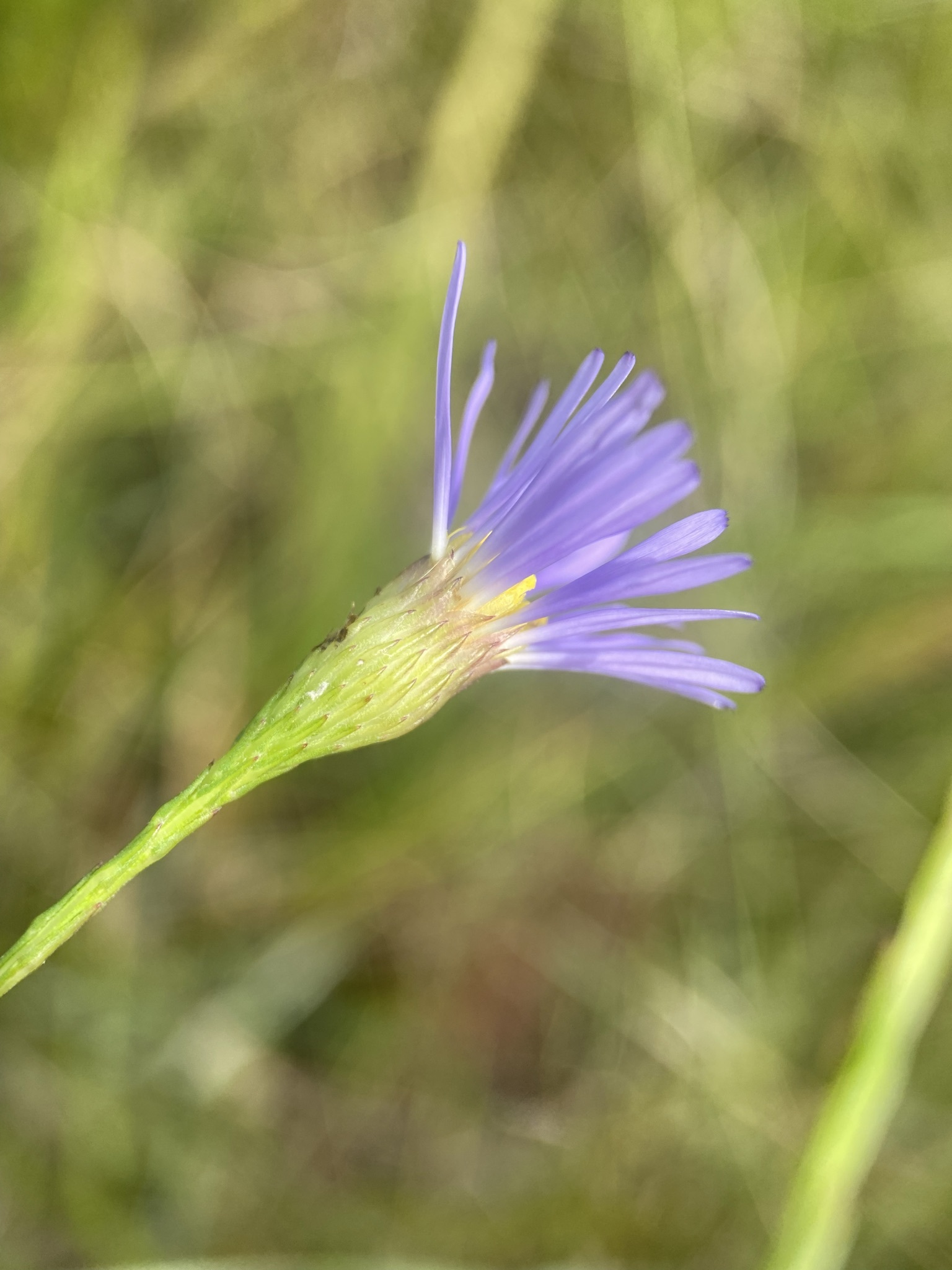
Flower head from bottom

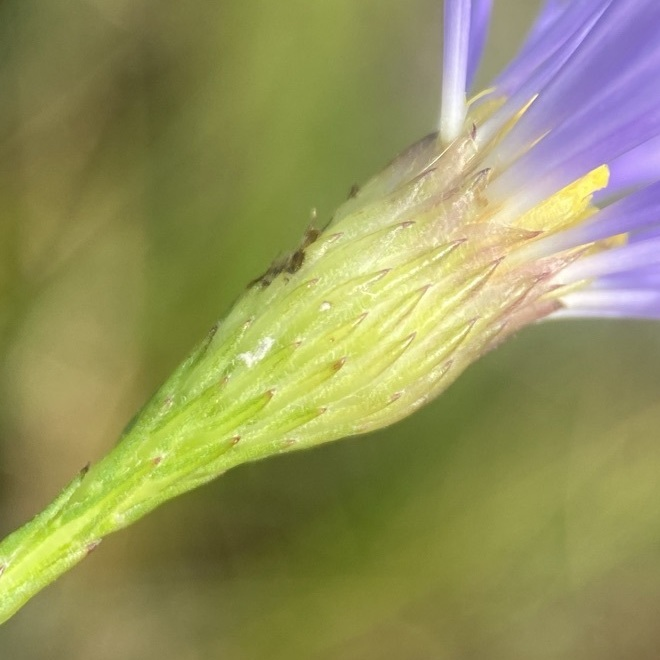
Bracts, involucre, and phyllaries

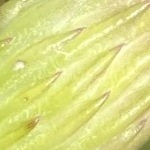
Phyllary detail

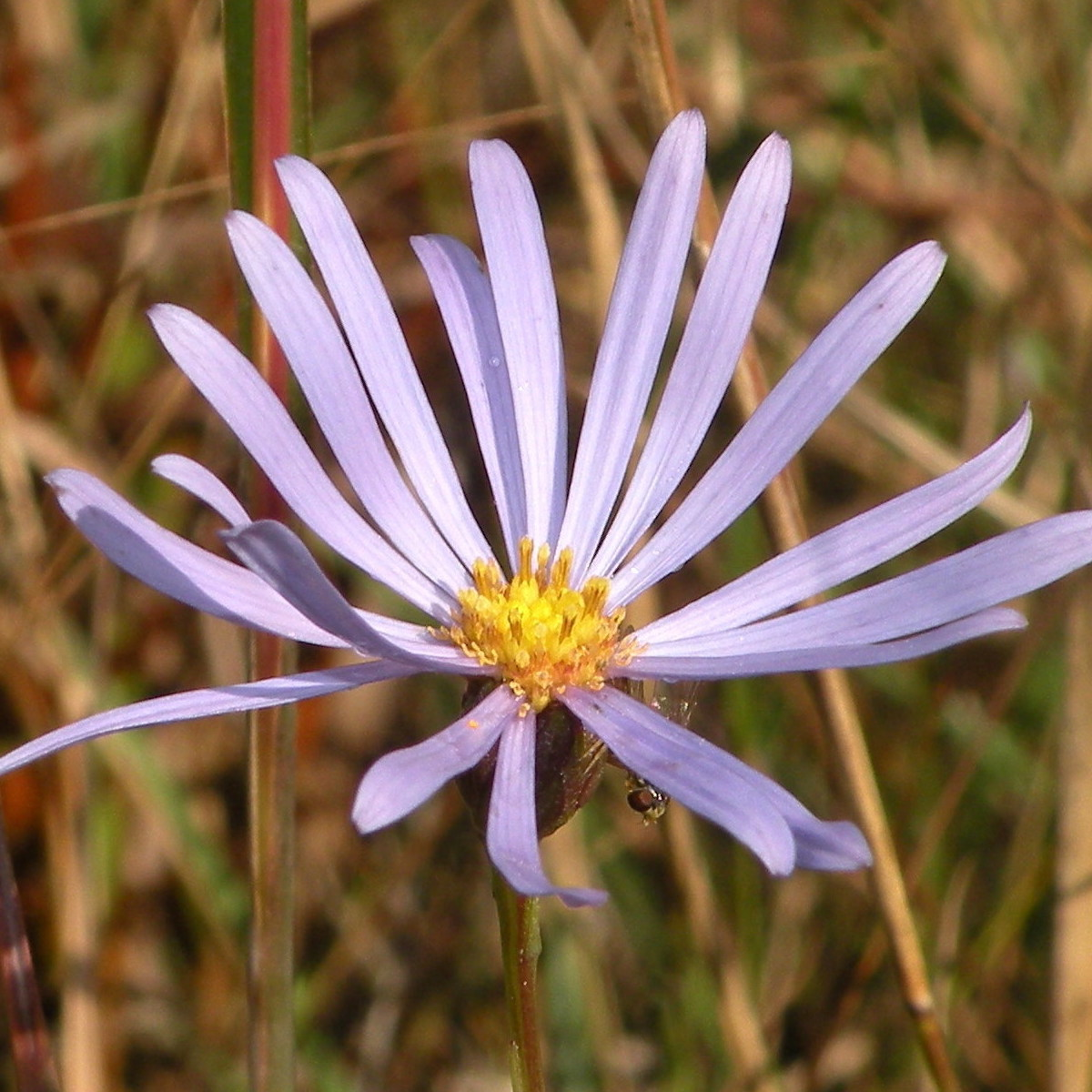
Flower head from top
