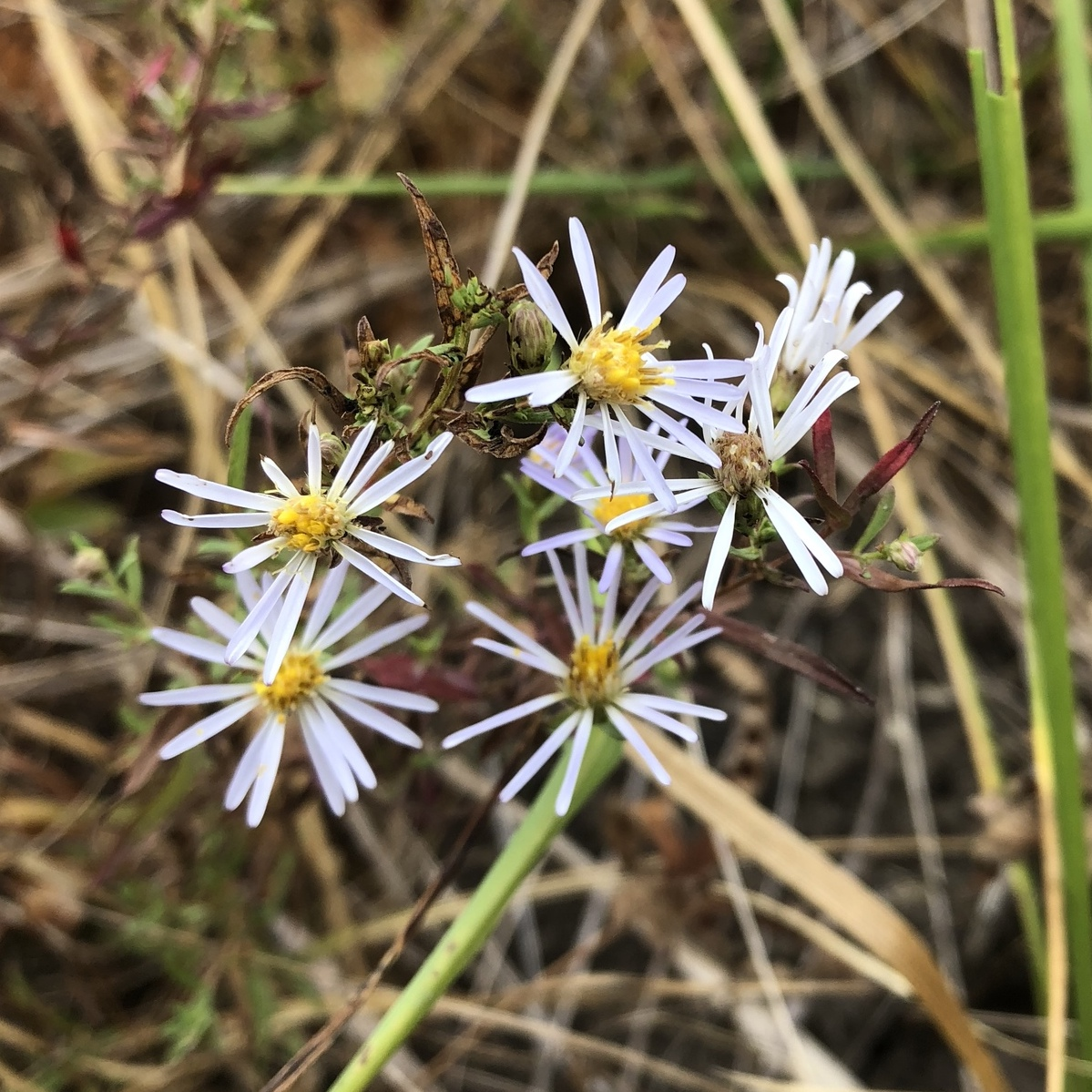

Conservation status
- Apparently Secure (NatureServe)

Scientific classification
- Kingdom: Plantae
- Clade: Tracheophytes
- Clade: Angiosperms
- Clade: Eudicots
- Clade: Asterids
- Order: Asterales
- Family: Asteraceae
- Tribe: Astereae
- Subtribe: Symphyotrichinae
- Genus: Symphyotrichum
- Subgenus: Symphyotrichum subg. Symphyotrichum
- Section: Symphyotrichum sect. Occidentales
- Species: S. hallii

Binomial name
- Symphyotrichum hallii (A.Gray) G.L.Nesom
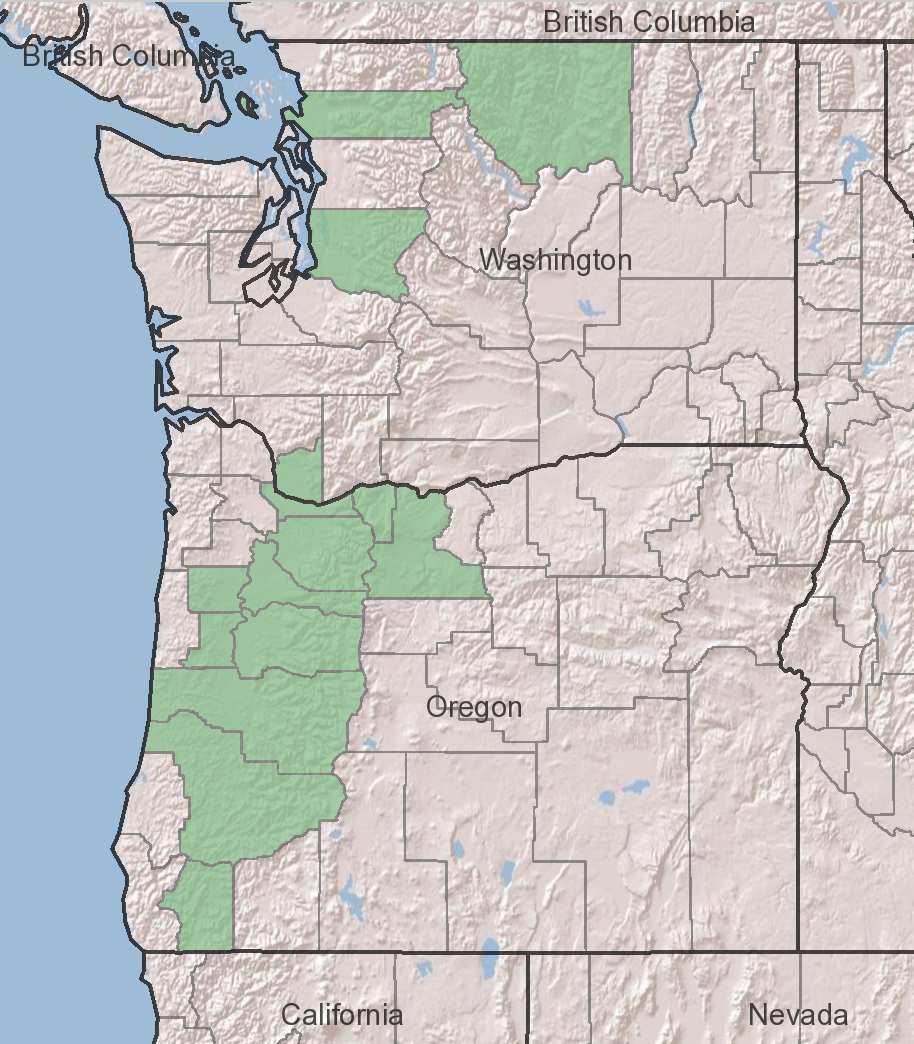
- Native distribution

Synonyms
- Aster chilensis subsp. hallii (A.Gray) Cronquist; Aster hallii A.Gray

= Symphyotrichum hallii =

Species of flowering plant in the daisy family

Symphyotrichum hallii (formerly Aster hallii) is a species of flowering plant in the family Asteraceae endemic to western Oregon and Washington states. Commonly known as Hall's aster, it is a perennial, herbaceous plant with a long rhizome that creates colonies of itself. It grows about 30–60 centimeters (1–2 feet) tall, and has white (sometimes pale violet) rays that open July–August.

Most occurrences of the species have been found at elevations of 0–500 meters (0–1,640 feet) in open areas in the Puget Sound region and Willamette Valley, with outliers in Columbia Gorge and central Washington. It is conservationally Imperiled (S2) in Washington state.
