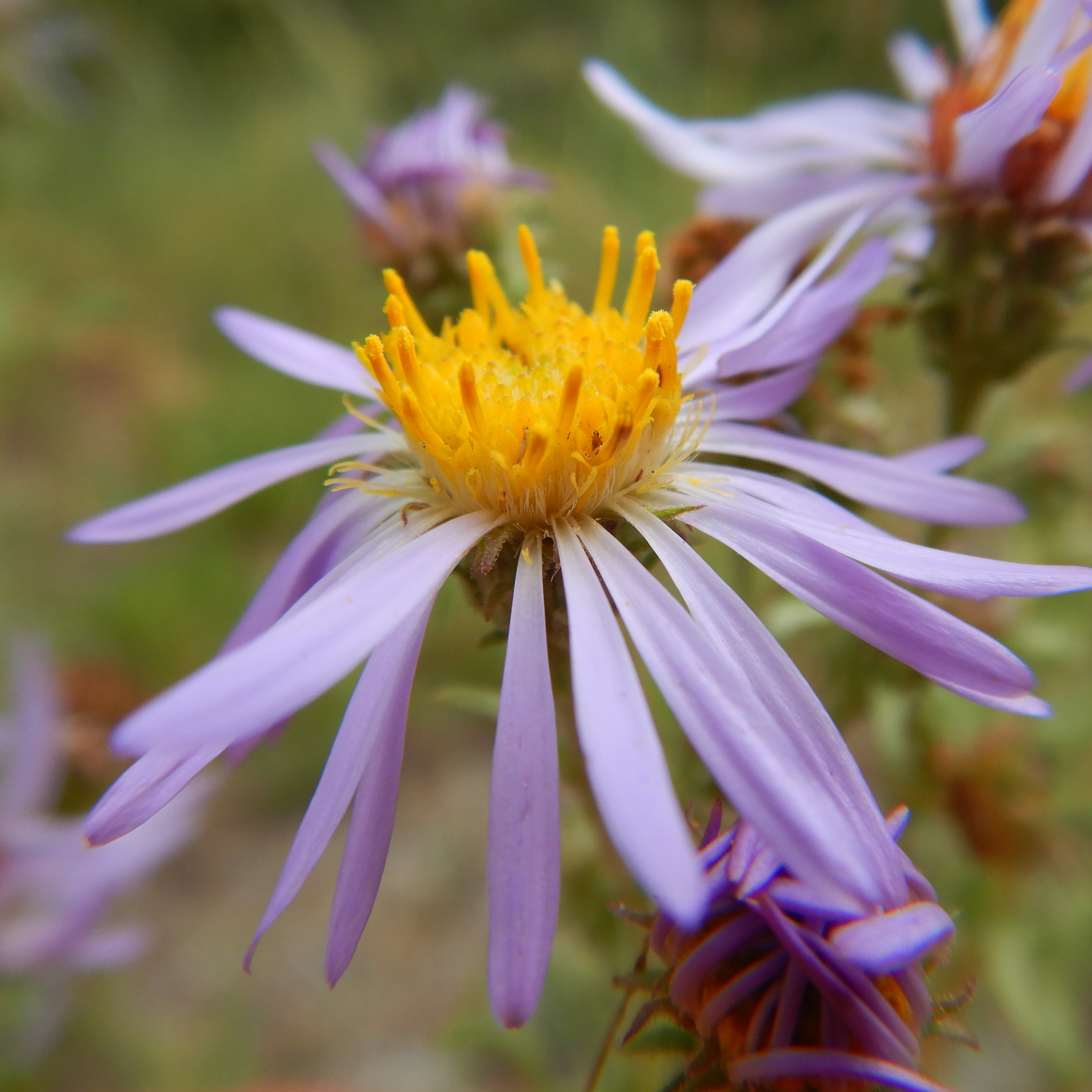
- S. campestre flower head

Conservation status
- Secure (NatureServe)

Scientific classification
- Kingdom: Plantae
- Clade: Tracheophytes
- Clade: Angiosperms
- Clade: Eudicots
- Clade: Asterids
- Order: Asterales
- Family: Asteraceae
- Tribe: Astereae
- Subtribe: Symphyotrichinae
- Genus: Symphyotrichum
- Subgenus: Symphyotrichum subg. Virgulus
- Section: Symphyotrichum sect. Grandiflori
- Species: S. campestre

Binomial name
- Symphyotrichum campestre (Nutt.) G.L.Nesom
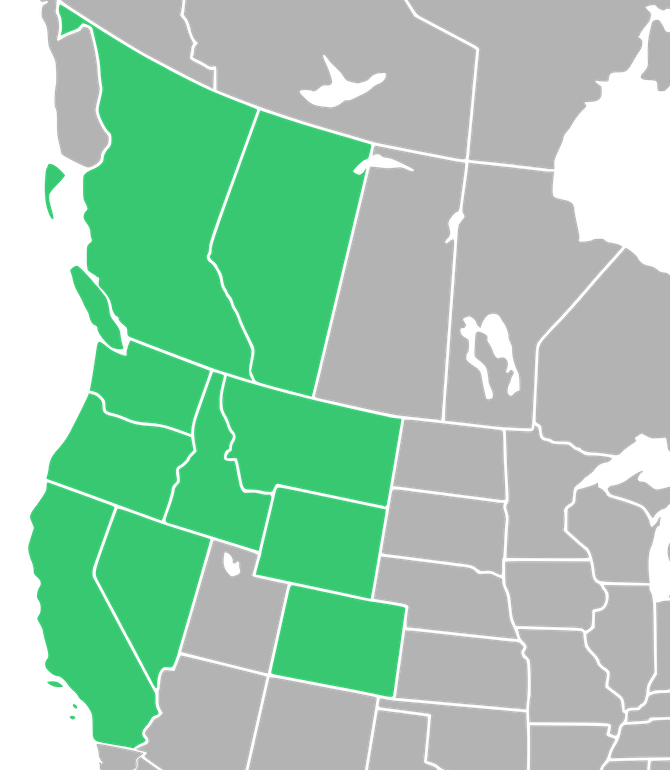
- Native distribution

Synonyms
- Basionym: Aster campestris Nutt.; Alphabetical list: Aster bloomeri A.Gray; Aster campestris var. bloomeri (A.Gray) A.Gray; Aster campestris subsp. suksdorfii Piper; Symphyotrichum campestre var. bloomeri (A.Gray) G.L.Nesom; Virgulus campestris (Nutt.) Reveal & Keener; Virgulus campestris var. bloomeri (A.Gray) Reveal & Keener

= Symphyotrichum campestre =

Species of flowering plant

Symphyotrichum campestre (formerly Aster campestris) is a species of flowering plant of the family Asteraceae commonly known as western meadow aster. It is native to much of western North America where it grows in many habitats, generally at some elevation.

== Description ==
Symphyotrichum campestre is a perennial, herbaceous plant growing to a maximum height near 40 centimeters (15 3/4 inches) from a long rhizome. The brown stems, leaves, and some parts of the flower heads are covered with tiny glands on tiny stalks called "stipitate glands". The leaves can be 1 to 8 centimeters (1/2 to 3 1/4 inches) long depending on their location on the plant, and linear to oval in shape. The inflorescence holds several flower heads containing many violet ray florets around a center of yellow disc florets. The fruit is a hairy cypsela.

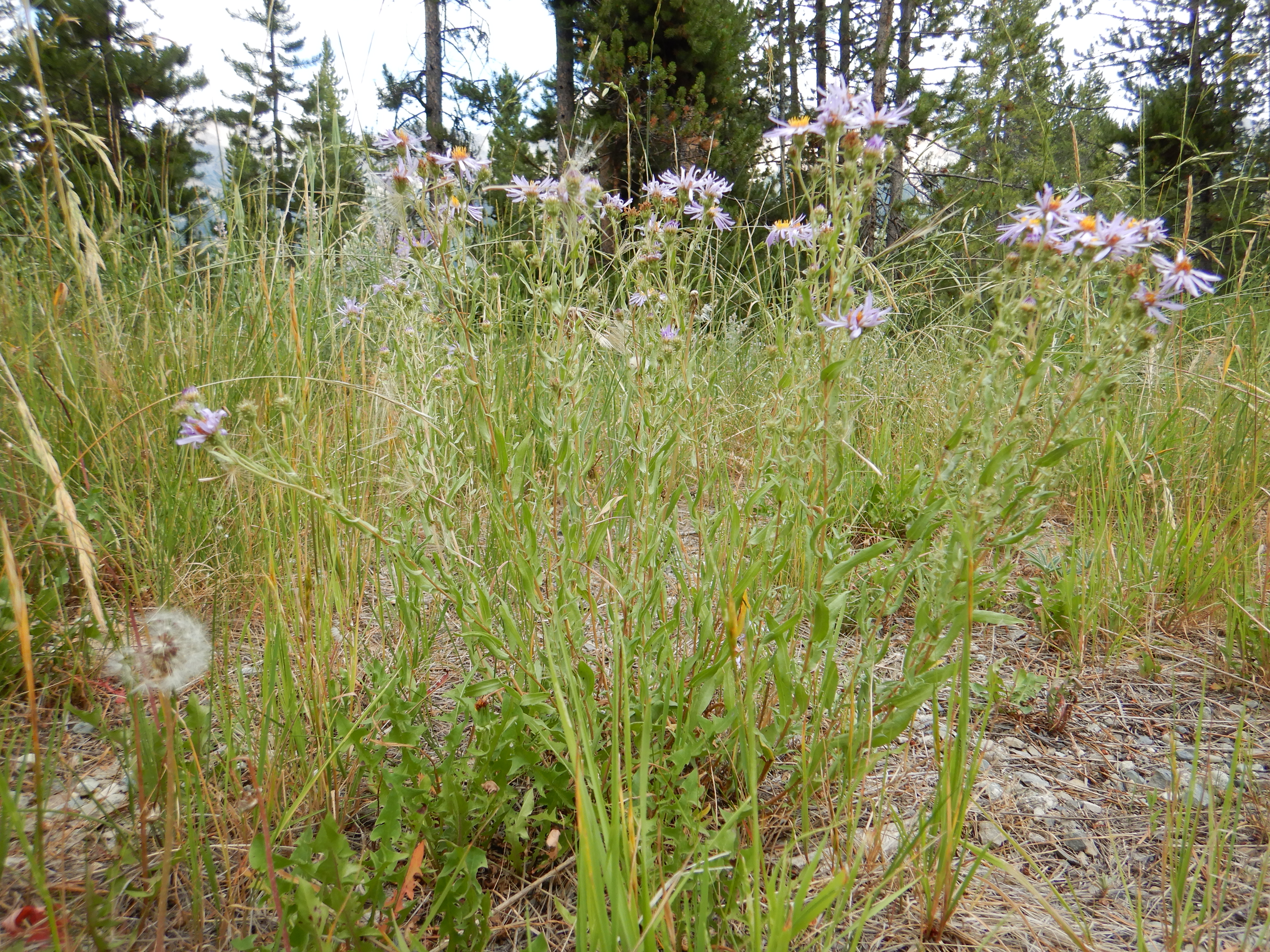
S. campestre in Idaho

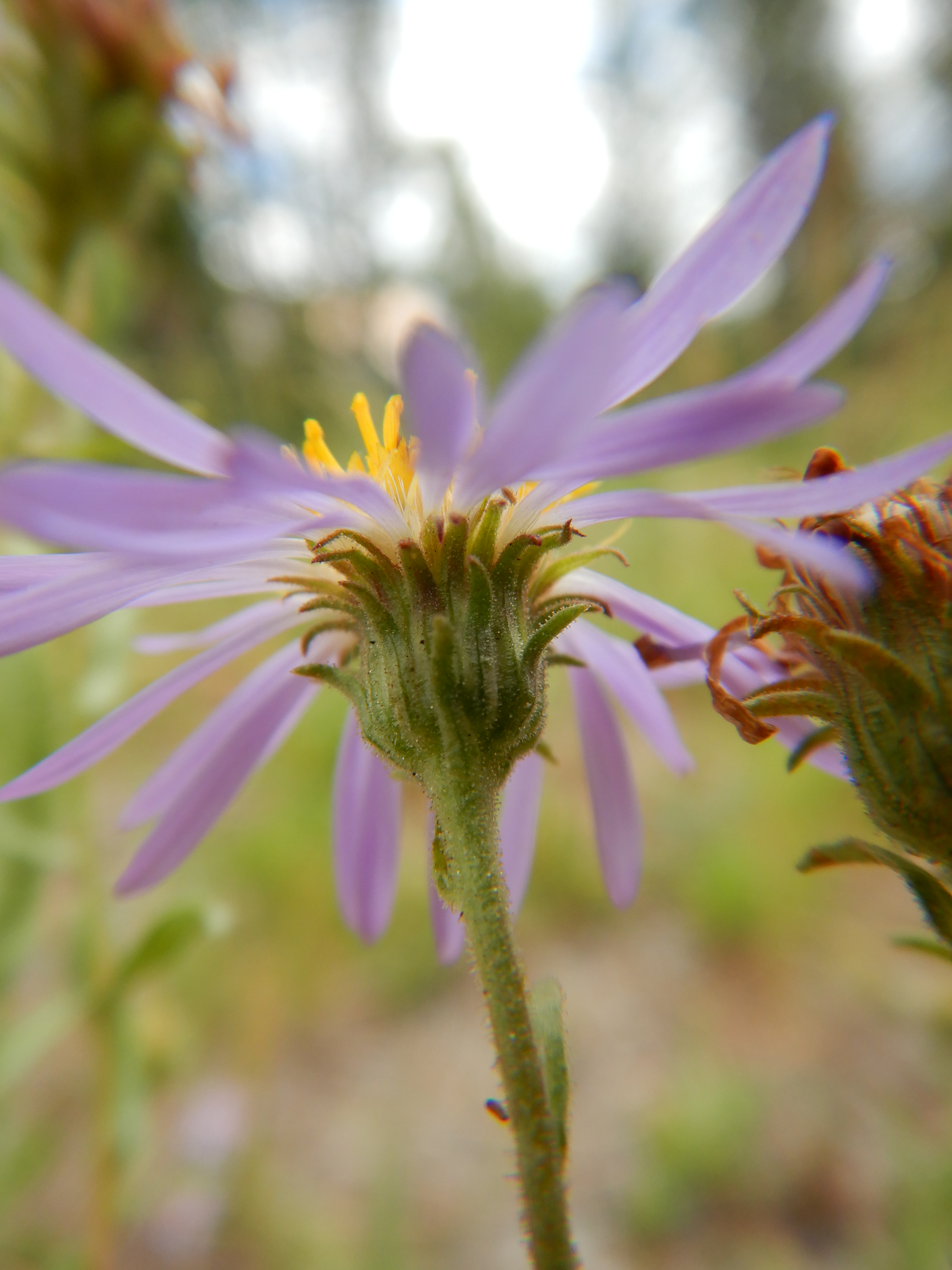
S. campestre involucre

== Distribution and habitat ==
The natural range of Symphyotrichum campestre extends much of the western United States and into parts of western Canada. It grows in states and provinces of the Cascadia bioregion in Alberta, British Columbia, Oregon, Washington, Idaho, and the western portion of Montana. Its range extends south in the mountainous areas of Nevada and California as far south as San Luis Obispo County. In the Rocky Mountain States, it can be found in many parts of Wyoming, three northern mountain counties of Colorado, and in a disjunct population in just two counties in New Mexico. Its habitat is at elevations of between 1,500 and 2,500 meters (4,900 and 8,200 feet), often in dry and rocky soils.

== Conservation ==
As of October 2024, NatureServe listed Symphyotrichum campestre as Secure (G5) worldwide, Vulnerable (S3) in Alberta and Wyoming, and Imperiled (S2) in Nevada. Its global status was last reviewed on 19 October 2019.
