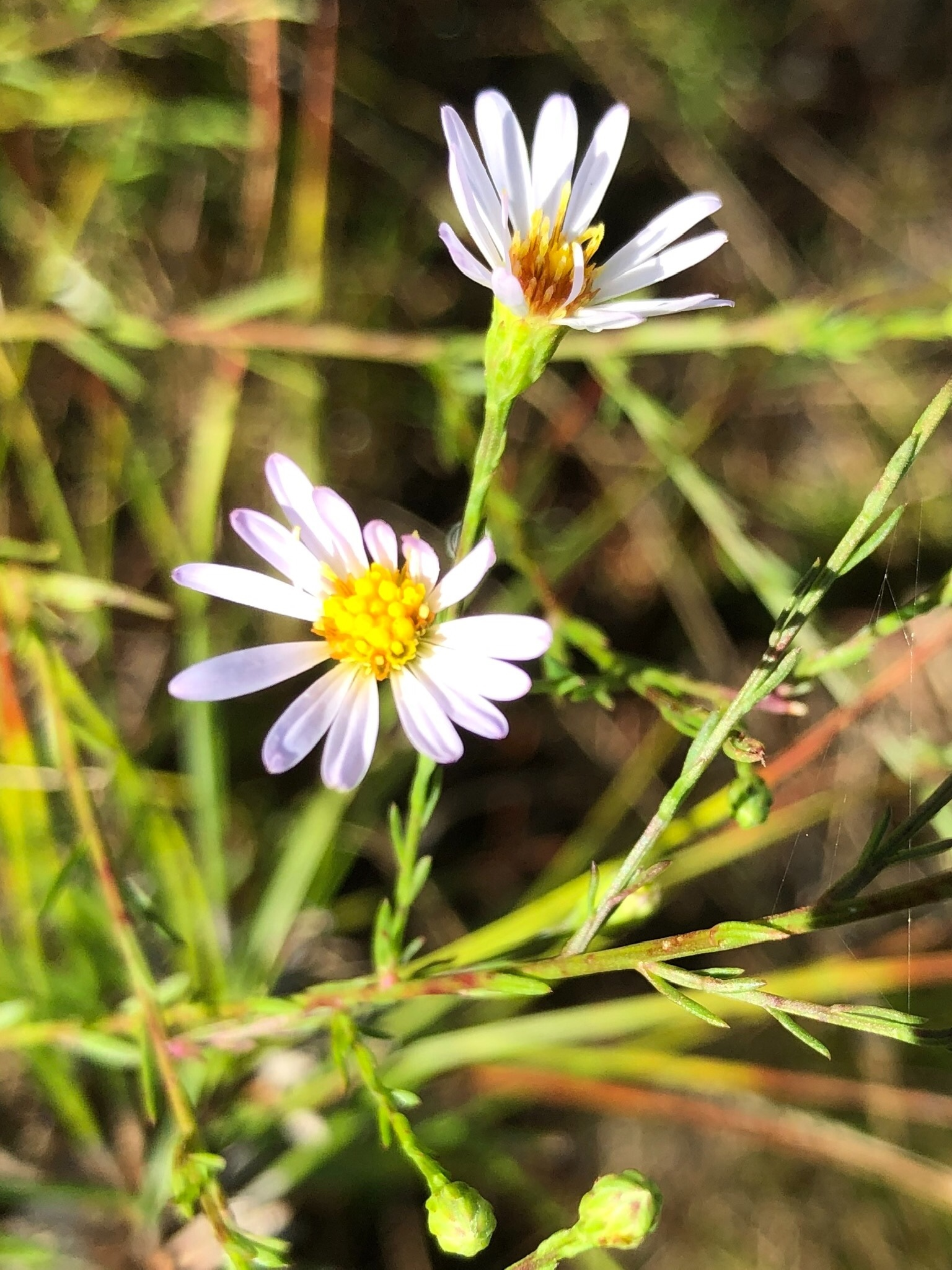

Conservation status
- Secure (NatureServe)

Scientific classification
- Kingdom: Plantae
- Clade: Tracheophytes
- Clade: Angiosperms
- Clade: Eudicots
- Clade: Asterids
- Order: Asterales
- Family: Asteraceae
- Genus: Symphyotrichum
- Subgenus: Symphyotrichum subg. Symphyotrichum
- Section: Symphyotrichum sect. Symphyotrichum
- Species: S. dumosum

Binomial name
- Symphyotrichum dumosum (L.) G.L.Nesom
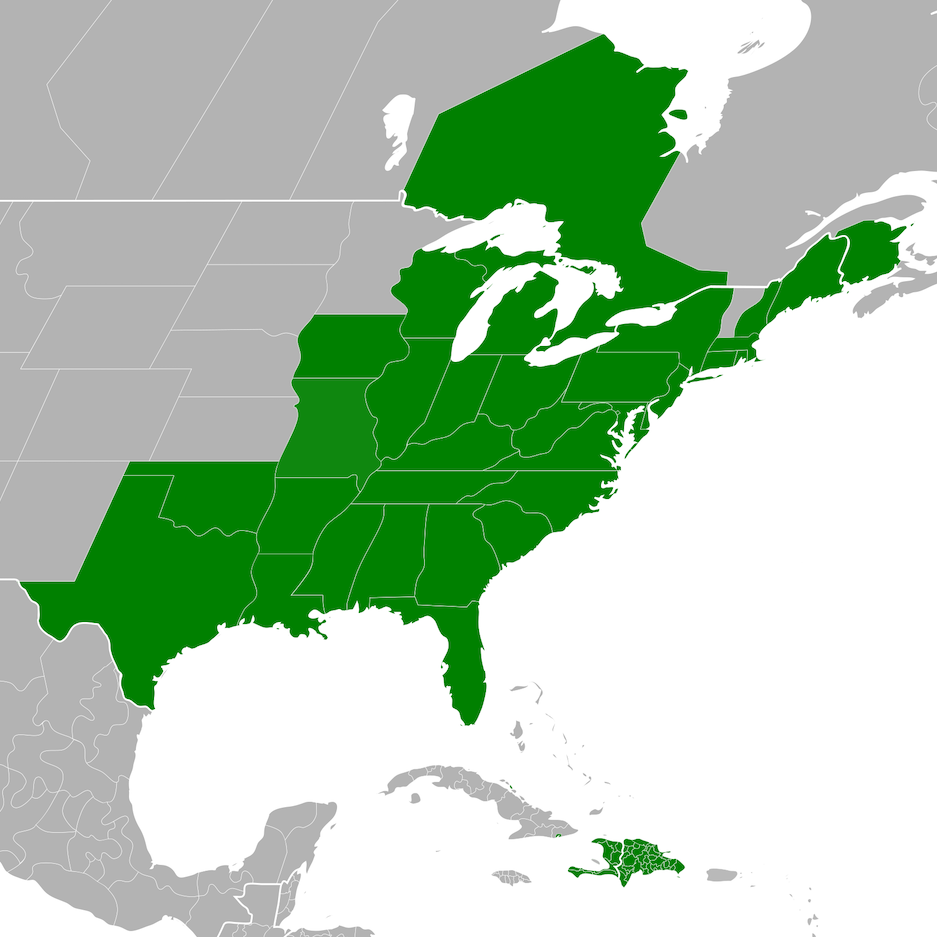
- Native distribution

Synonyms
- Basionym: Aster dumosus L.; Alphabetical list: Aster coridifolius Michx.; Aster dumosus f. monocephalus Farw.; Aster dumosus var. albus Pursh; Aster dumosus var. coridifolius (Michx.) Torr. & A.Gray; Aster dumosus var. dodgei Fernald; Aster dumosus var. foliosus Alph.Wood; Aster dumosus var. gracilentus Torr. & A.Gray; Aster dumosus var. gracilipes Wiegand; Aster dumosus var. pergracilis Wiegand; Aster dumosus var. strictior Torr. & A.Gray; Aster dumosus var. subracemosus Torr. & A.Gray; Aster dumosus var. subulifolius Torr. & A.Gray; Aster dumosus var. verus Torr. & A.Gray; Aster dumosus var. violaceus Pursh; Aster foliaceus var. coridifolius (Michx.) Nutt.; Aster foliosus Pers.; Aster fragilis Lindl.; Aster gracilipes Alexander ex Small; Aster sparsiflorus Michx.; Leiachenis dumosa Raf.; Leiachenis sparsiflorus Raf.; Symphyotrichum dumosum var. dodgei (Fernald) G.L.Nesom; Symphyotrichum dumosum var. gracilipes (Wiegand) G.L.Nesom; Symphyotrichum dumosum var. pergracile (Wiegand) G.L.Nesom; Symphyotrichum dumosum var. strictior (Torr. & A.Gray) G.L.Nesom; Symphyotrichum dumosum var. subulifolium (Torr. & A.Gray) G.L.Nesom

= Symphyotrichum dumosum =

Species of flowering plant in the aster family

Symphyotrichum dumosum (formerly Aster dumosus) is a species of flowering plant of the family Asteraceae commonly known as rice button aster and bushy aster. It is native to much of eastern and central North America, as well as Haiti and Dominican Republic. It is a perennial, herbaceous plant that may reach a height of 1 meter (3 feet 3 inches).

== Description ==
Symphyotrichum dumosum is a perennial, herbaceous plant that grows up to 1 meter (3 feet 3 inches) high.

=== Flowers ===
Symphyotrichum dumosum is a late-summer and fall blooming perennial, with flower heads opening August–October. The flower heads are about 13 millimeters (1/2 inch) diameter when in bloom and grow in open and much-branched paniculiform arrays. Each has many tiny florets put together into what appear as one.

==== Involucres and phyllaries ====
On the outside the flower heads of all members of the family Asteraceae are small bracts that look like scales. These are called phyllaries, and together they form the involucre that protects the individual flowers in the head before they open. (Note: See Asteracae § Flowers for more detail.) The involucres of Symphyotrichum dumosum are cylinder-bell in shape and usually 4.5–6.3 mm (1/5–1/4 in) (Note: Outside range 3–6.3 mm (1/10–1/4 in).) long.

The phyllaries are appressed or slightly spreading. The shape of the outer phyllaries is oblong-oblanceolate or linear-oblanceolate, and the innermost phyllaries are linear. They are in 4–6 strongly unequal rows, meaning they are very staggered and do not end at the same point, and they are hairless.

==== Florets ====
The 15–33 ray florets are blue, pink, purple, or white, with a length averaging 5–7 mm (1/5–3/10 in) (Note: Outside range 4–8 mm (1/6–1/3 in).) and width of 1–1.7 mm (1/24–1/16 in). Ray florets in the Symphyotrichum genus are exclusively female, each having a pistil (with style, stigma, and ovary) but no stamen; thus, ray florets accept pollen and each can develop a seed, but they produce no pollen.

The 15–30 disk florets start out as pale yellow and turn pink with age. They are in the shape of a narrow funnel and are shallow at 3.5–4.5 mm (3/20–1/5 in) in depth. The disk florets are each made up of 5 petals, collectively a corolla, which open into 5 lanceolate lobes (Note: There are 5 lobes on the disk florets of all species in Symphyotrichum genus.) comprising less than 25% of the depth of the floret. Disk florets in the Symphyotrichum genus are bisexual, each with both male (stamen, anthers, and filaments) and female reproductive parts; thus, a disk floret produces pollen and can develop a seed.

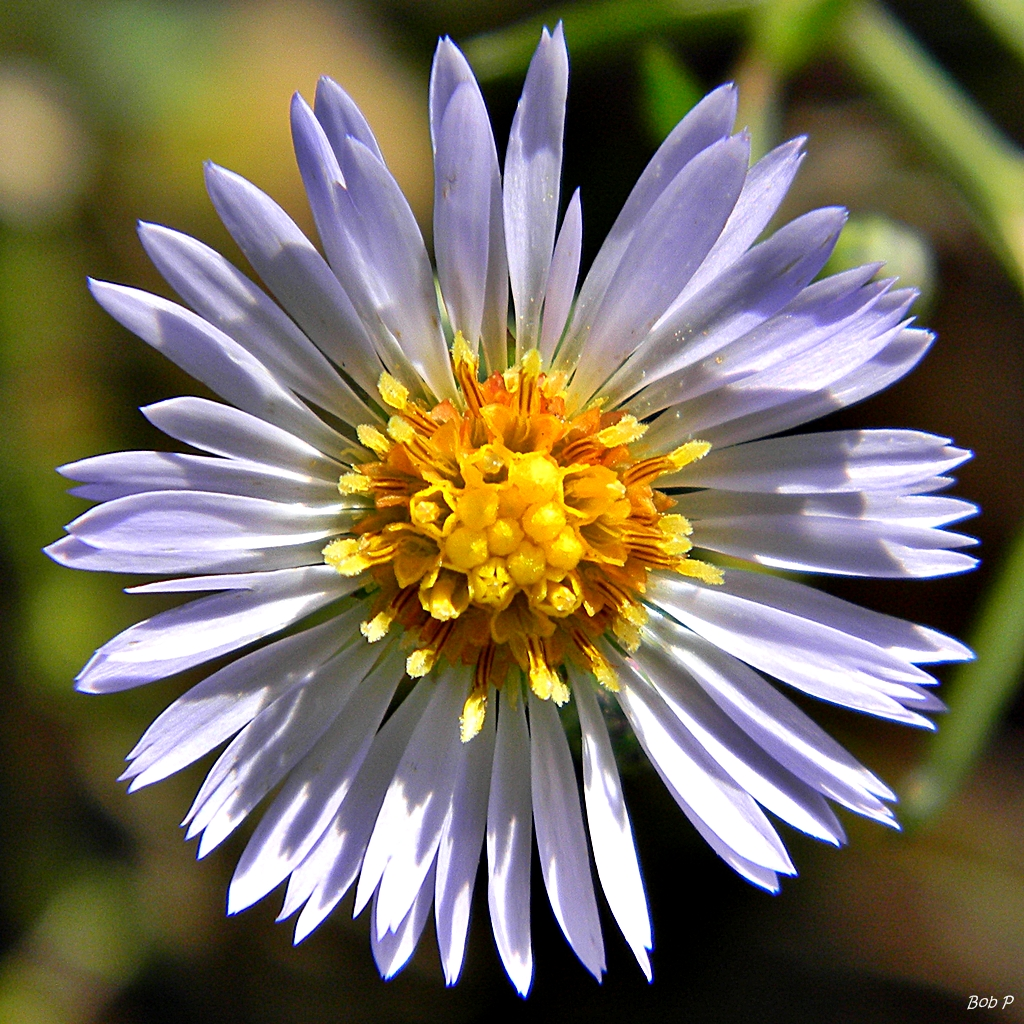
Flower head showing ray and disk florets

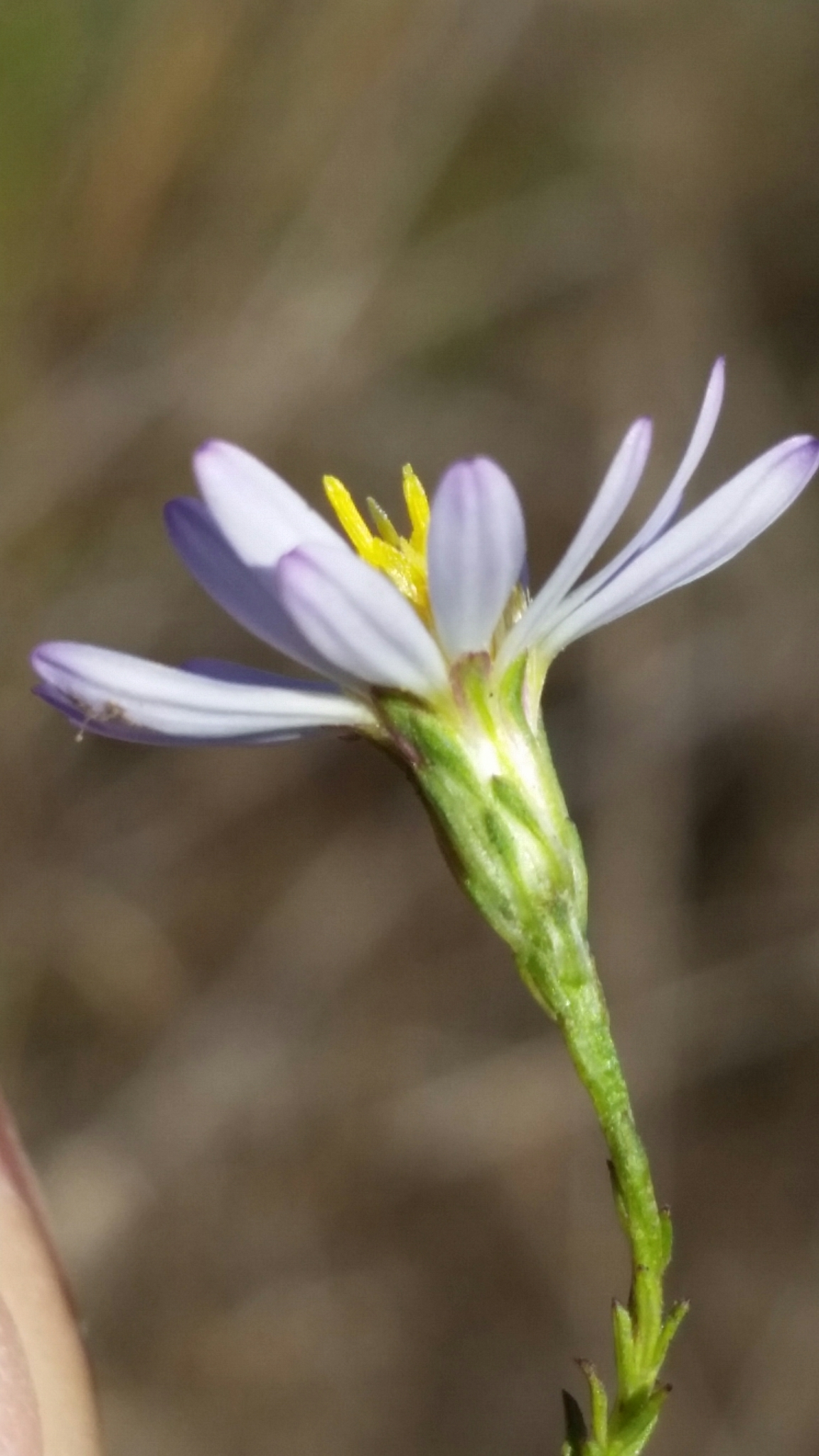
Involucre, phyllaries, and bracts

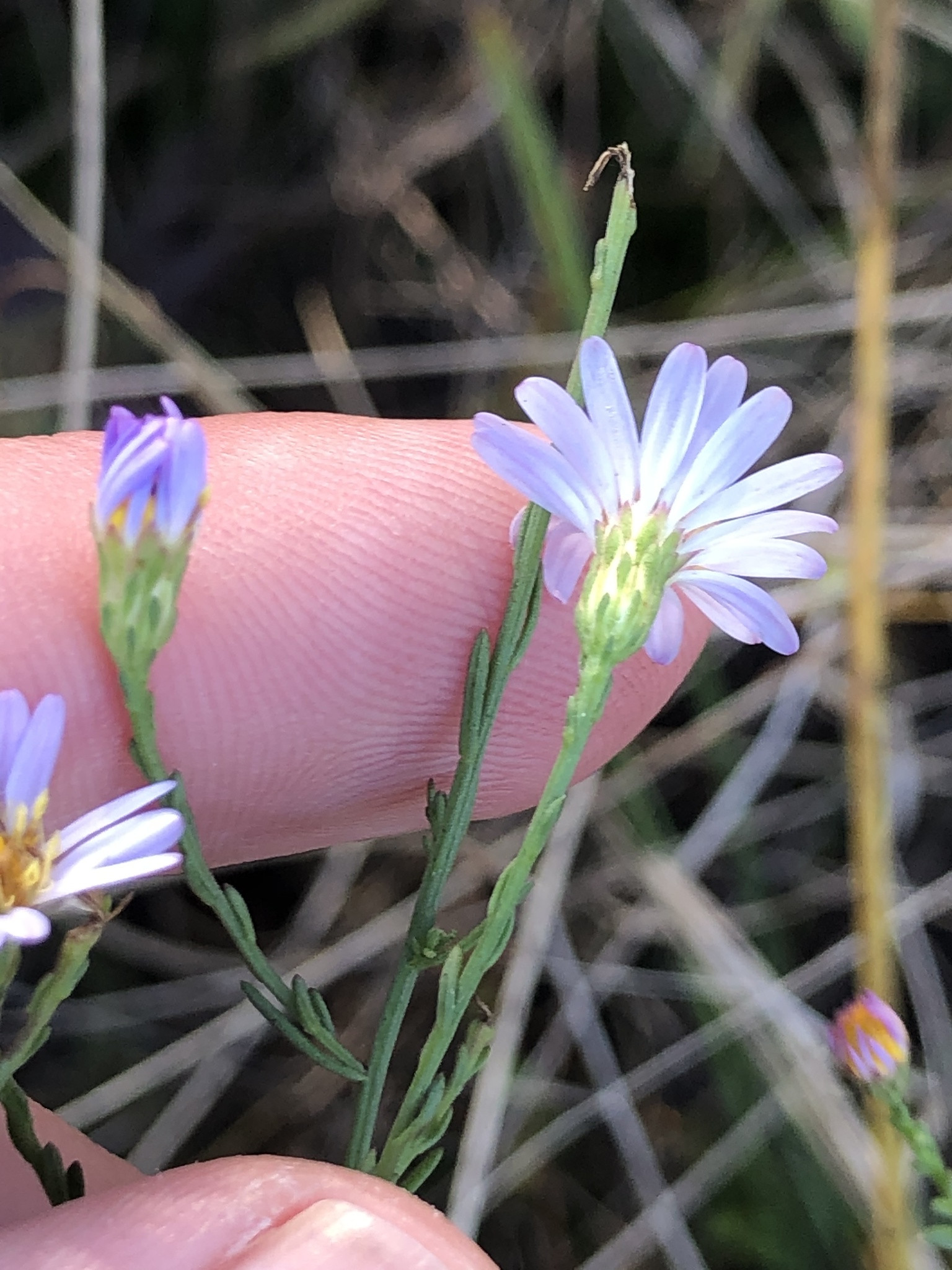
Involucre, phyllaries, and bracts

=== Chromosomes ===
Symphyotrichum dumosum has a chromosome number of x = 8. Diploid and tetraploid cytotypes with respective chromosome counts of 16 and 32 have been reported.

== Taxonomy ==
This species was long known as Aster dumosus before it was moved into its current genus due to a phylogenetic analysis performed by American botanist Guy L. Nesom. The genus Aster has been narrowed considerably in scope in recent years, due to new information about the relationships of the species in the group.

Symphyotrichum dumosum is classified in the subgenus Symphyotrichum, section Symphyotrichum, subsection Dumosi. It is one of the "bushy asters and relatives." The specific epithet (second part of the scientific name) dumosum is Latin neuter case of dumosus and means "full of thornbushes" and "bushy" (rare).

=== Infraspecies ===
Although the following infraspecies are no longer accepted varieties according to Catalogue of Life (COL), Plants of the World Online (POWO), and World Flora Online (WFO), they were accepted as of June 2021 by USDA PLANTS Database, NatureServe, and Integrated Taxonomic Information System (ITIS). The autonym is Symphyotrichum dumosum var. dumosum.

- Symphyotrichum dumosum var. gracilipes (Wiegand) G.L.Nesom
- Symphyotrichum dumosum var. pergracile (Wiegand) G.L.Nesom
- Symphyotrichum dumosum var. strictior (Torr. & A.Gray) G.L.Nesom
- Symphyotrichum dumosum var. subulifolium (Torr. & A.Gray) G.L.Nesom
Species classifications
- - Symphyotrichum
    - subg. Chapmaniana
      S. chapmanii
    - subg. Astropolium
      - S. divaricatum
      - S. glabrifolium
      - S. graminifolium
      - S. martii
      - S. parviflorum
      - S. patagonicum
      - S. peteroanum
      - S. potosinum
      - S. regnellii
      - S. subulatum
      - S. tenuifolium
      - S. vahlii
    - subg. Virgulus
      - sect. Ericoidei
        - S. ericoides
        - S. falcatum
      - sect. Patentes
        - ssect. Brachyphylli
          - S. adnatum
          - S. walteri
        - ssect. Patentes
          - S. georgianum
          - S. patens
          - S. phlogifolium
      - sect. Grandiflori
        - ssect. Mexicanae
          - S. bimater
          - S. chihuahuense
          - S. hintonii
          - S. moranense
          - S. purpurascens
          - S. trilineatum
          - S. turneri
        - ssect. Grandiflori
          - S. campestre
          - S. estesii
          - S. fendleri
          - S. fontinale
          - S. grandiflorum
          - S. oblongifolium
          - S. pygmaeum
          - S. yukonense
      - sect. Polyliguli
        S. novae-angliae
      - sect. Concolores
        - S. concolor
        - S. lucayanum
        - S. plumosum
        - S. pratense
        - S. sericeum
    - subg. Ascendentes (Note: Sugbenus Ascendentes is made up of two allopolyploid species with historic parents from subg. Virgulus and subg. Symphyotrichum.)
      - S. ascendens
      - S. defoliatum
    - subg. Symphyotrichum
      - sect. Conyzopsis
        - S. ciliatum
        - S. frondosum
        - S. laurentianum
      - sect. Occidentales
        - S. chilense
        - S. eatonii
        - S. foliaceum
        - S. greatae
        - S. hallii
        - S. hendersonii
        - S. jessicae
        - S. lentum
        - S. molle
        - S. spathulatum
        - S. subspicatum
      - sect. Turbinelli
        S. turbinellum
      - sect. Symphyotrichum
        - ssect. Dumosi
          - S. boreale
          - S. bullatum
          - S. burgessii
          - S. carnerosanum
          - S. dumosum
          - S. eulae
          - S. lanceolatum
          - S. lateriflorum
          - S. leone
          - S. nahanniense
          - S. ontarionis
          - S. praealtum
          - S. racemosum
          - S. schaffneri
          - S. simmondsii
          - S. tradescantii
          - S. welshii
        - ssect. Heterophylli
          - ser. Concinni
            - S. laeve
            - S. oolentangiense
          - ser. Cordifolii
            - S. anomalum
            - S. ciliolatum
            - S. cordifolium
            - S. drummondii
            - S. shortii
            - S. undulatum
            - S. urophyllum
        - ssect. Porteriani
          - S. depauperatum
          - S. kentuckiense
          - S. parviceps
          - S. pilosum
          - S. porteri
        - ssect. Symphyotrichum
          - ser. Punicei
            - S. elliottii
            - S. firmum
            - S. prenanthoides
            - S. puniceum
            - S. rhiannon
          - ser. Symphyotrichum
            - S. anticostense
            - S. novi-belgii
            - S. retroflexum
            - S. robynsianum
  Cladogram references

== Distribution and habitat ==
=== Distribution ===
Symphyotrichum dumosum has a recorded native presence in the wild in the Canadian province of Ontario, and in the United States in all states east of the Mississippi River except Vermont, as well as west of the Mississippi River in Iowa, Missouri, Oklahoma, Arkansas, Texas, and Louisiana. It is also native on the Caribbean island of Hispaniola.

It is an introduced species in New Brunswick, and in the countries of Belgium, France, Great Britain, Poland, Romania, and Switzerland. It is not on the European Union's List of invasive alien species of Union concern.

=== Habitat ===
Symphyotrichum dumosum is categorized on the United States National Wetland Plant List (NWPL) with Wetland Indicator Status Rating of Facultative (FAC), choosing wetlands or non-wetlands and adjusting accordingly.

== Conservation ==
As of July 2021, NatureServe lists Symphyotrichum dumosum as Secure (G5) worldwide with notation that the global status was last reviewed in 1985. Some North American province and state statuses are as follows: Presumed Extirpated (SX) in Iowa, Possibly Extirpated (SH) in Maine, Critically Imperiled (S1) in Pennsylvania, Imperiled (S2) in Ontario and Ohio, and Vulnerable (S3) in New York and Florida.

== Ecology ==
Symphyotrichum dumosum is insect pollinated and is recorded to have been visited in northern Florida by Augochloropsis metallica and Melissodes boltoniae.

== Gallery ==
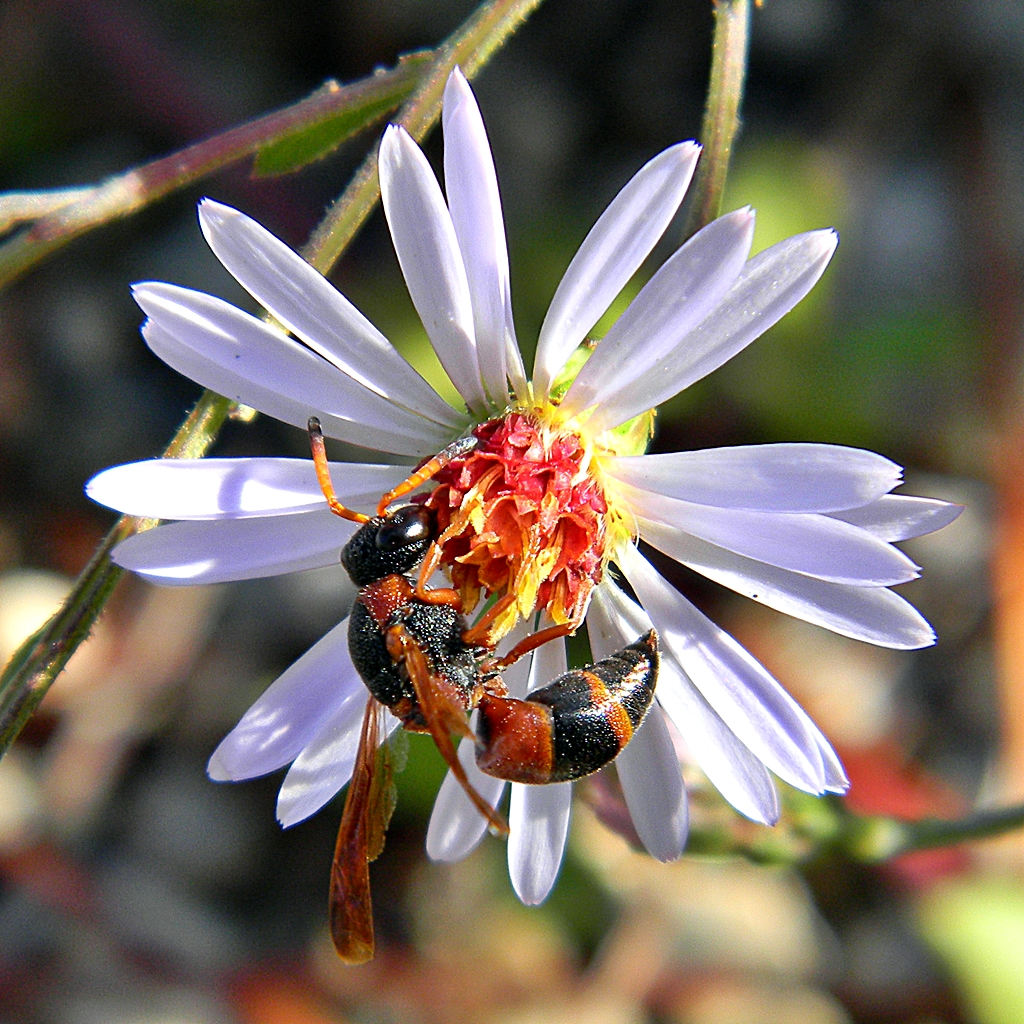
Mason wasp on flower head

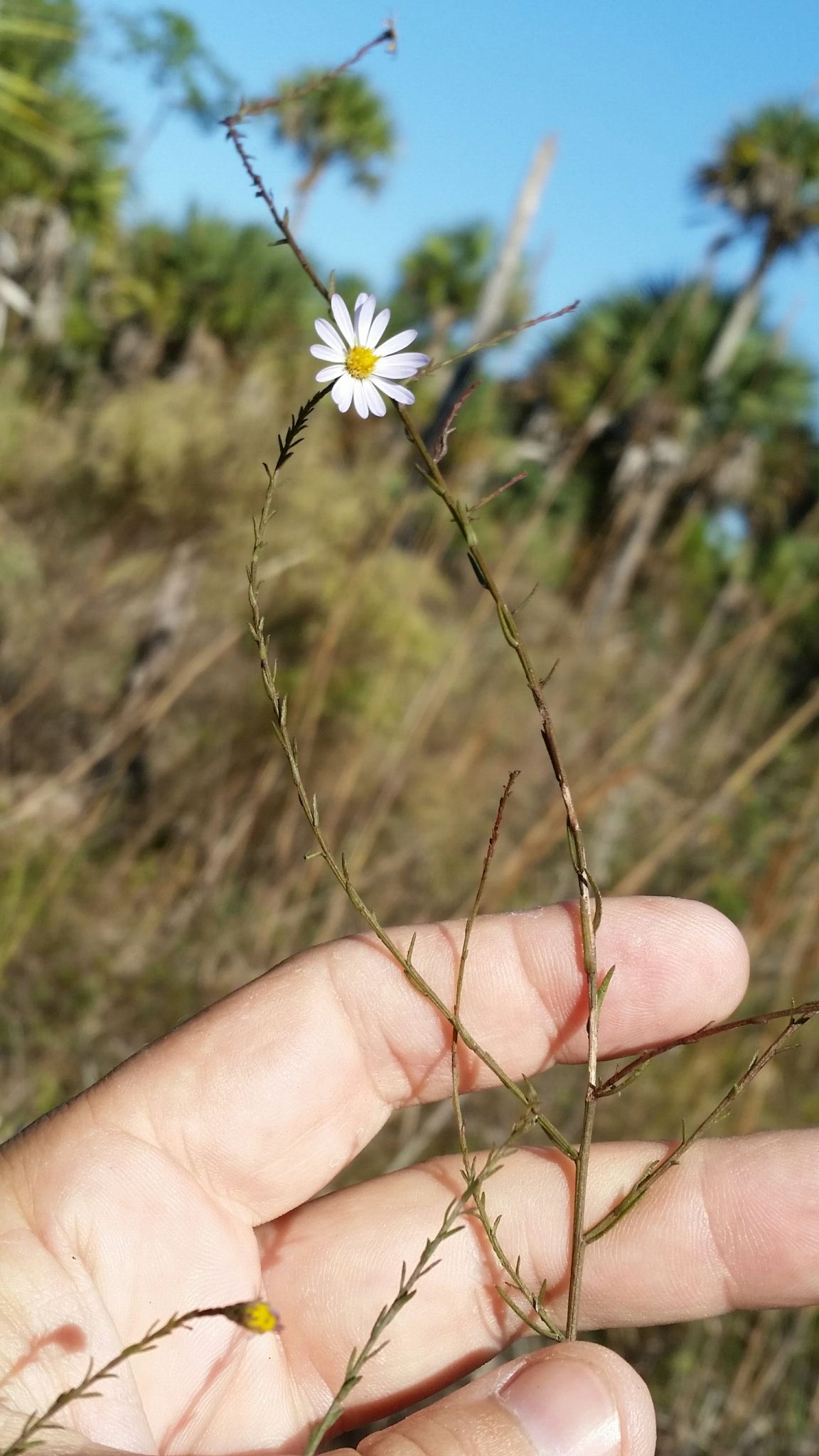
Stem and flower head

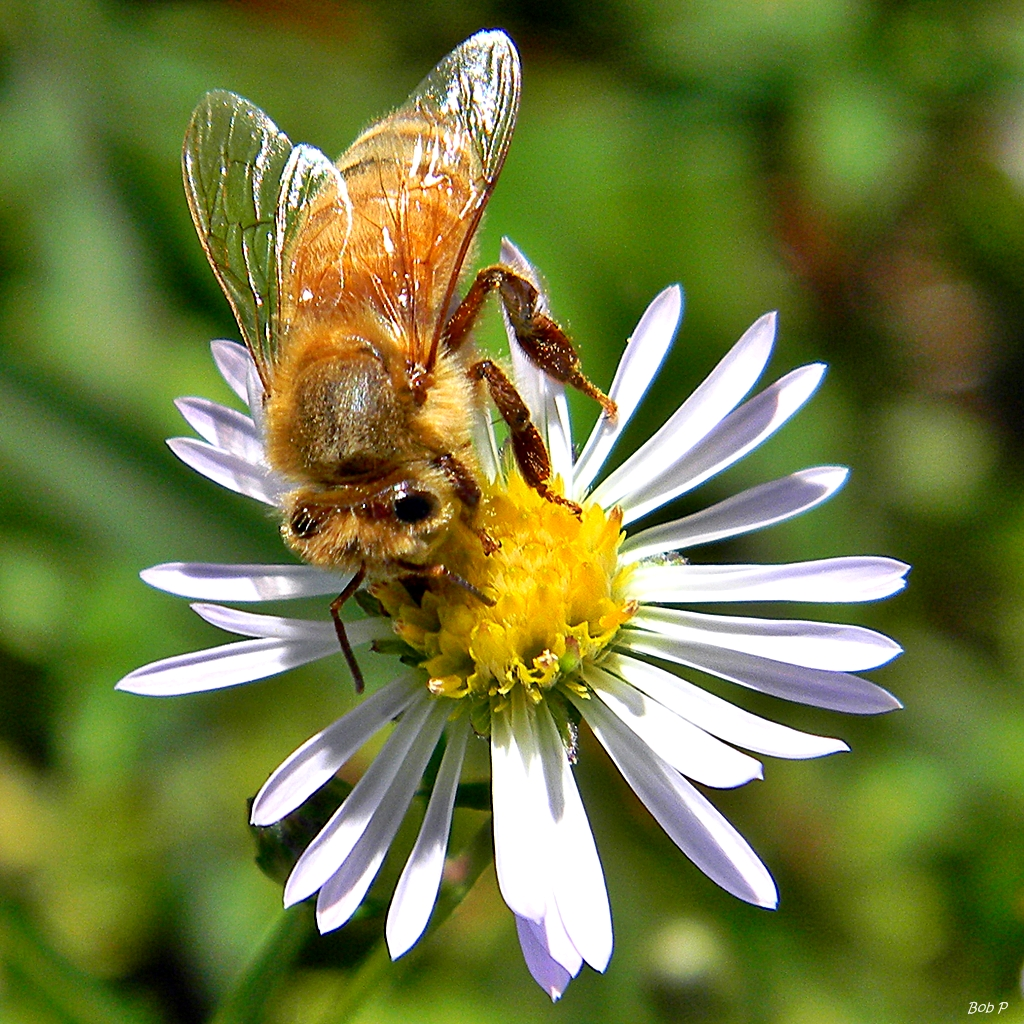
Honey bee on flower head

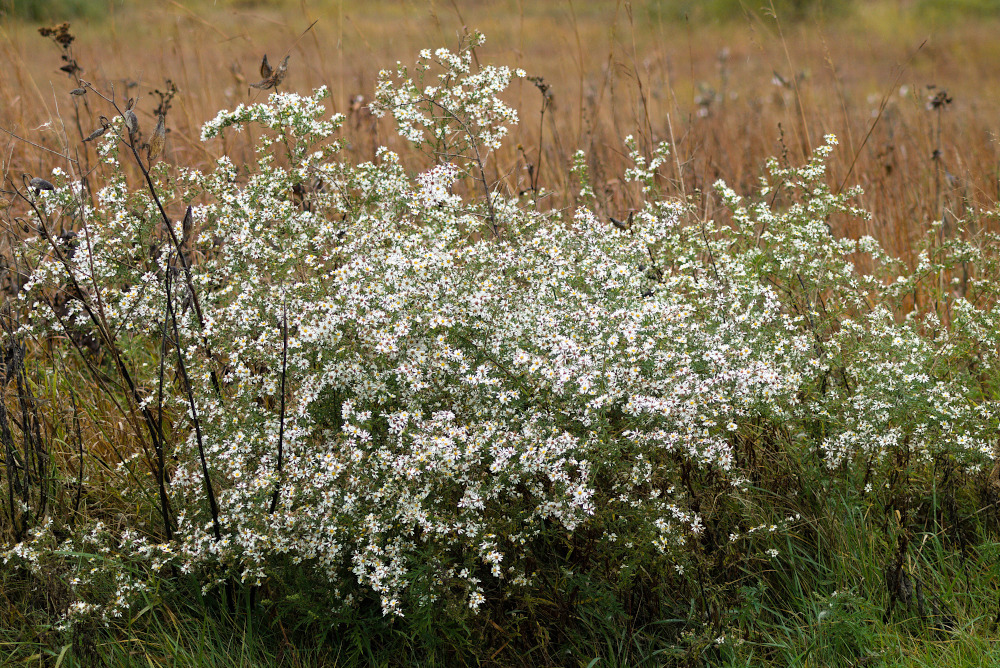
Cluster or small colony of S. dumosum
