= Long-leaved aster =

Long-leaved aster is a common name for several plants and may refer to:

- Symphyotrichum ascendens, native to western North America
- Symphyotrichum robynsianum, native to eastern North America
