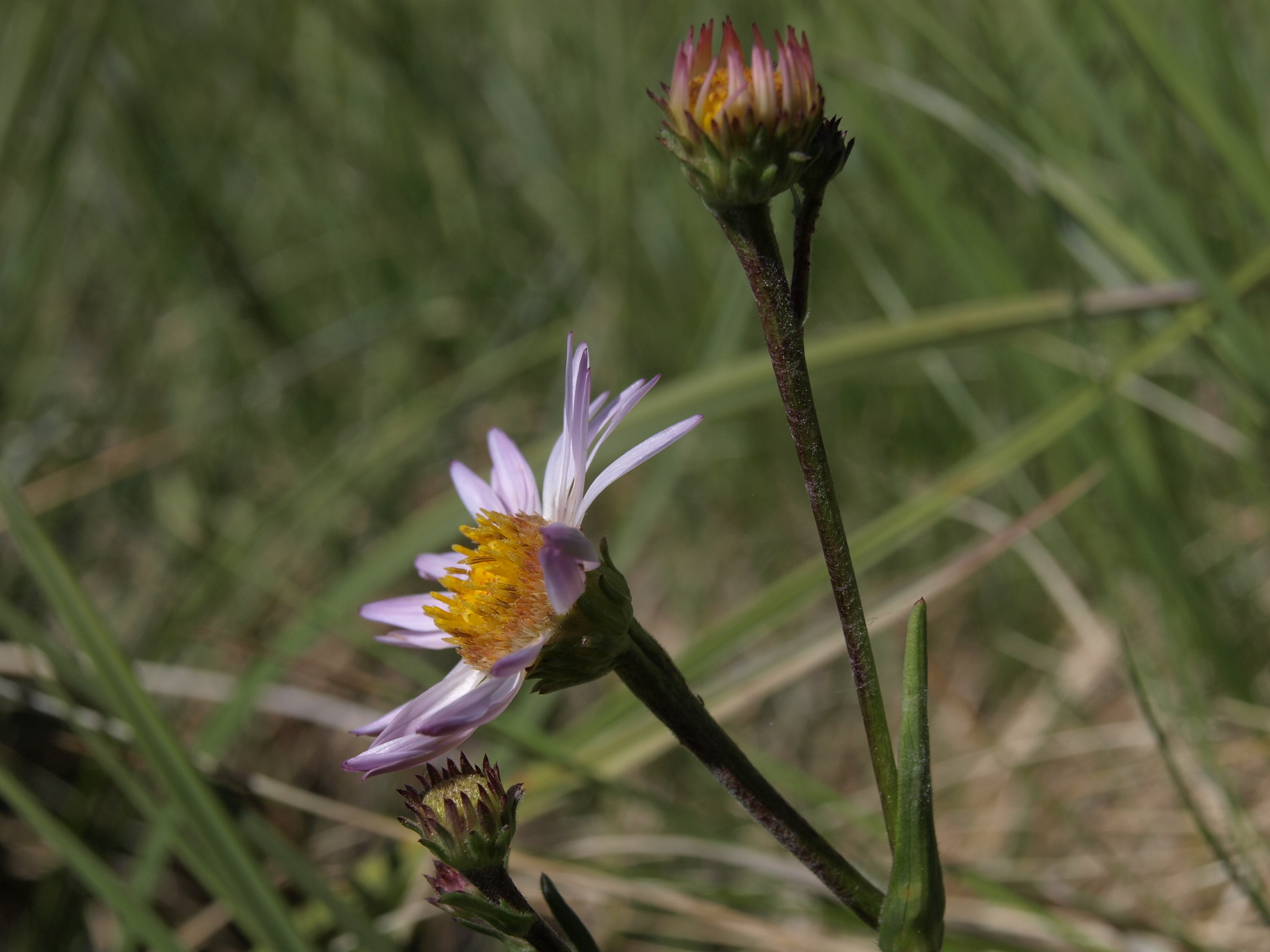

Conservation status
- Secure (NatureServe)

Scientific classification
- Kingdom: Plantae
- Clade: Tracheophytes
- Clade: Angiosperms
- Clade: Eudicots
- Clade: Asterids
- Order: Asterales
- Family: Asteraceae
- Genus: Symphyotrichum
- Subgenus: Symphyotrichum subg. Symphyotrichum
- Section: Symphyotrichum sect. Occidentales
- Species: S. spathulatum

Binomial name
- Symphyotrichum spathulatum (Lindl.) G.L.Nesom

Varieties
- List: S. spathulatum var. spathulatum; S. spathulatum var. intermedium (A.Gray) G.L.Nesom; S. spathulatum var. yosemitanum (A.Gray) G.L.Nesom
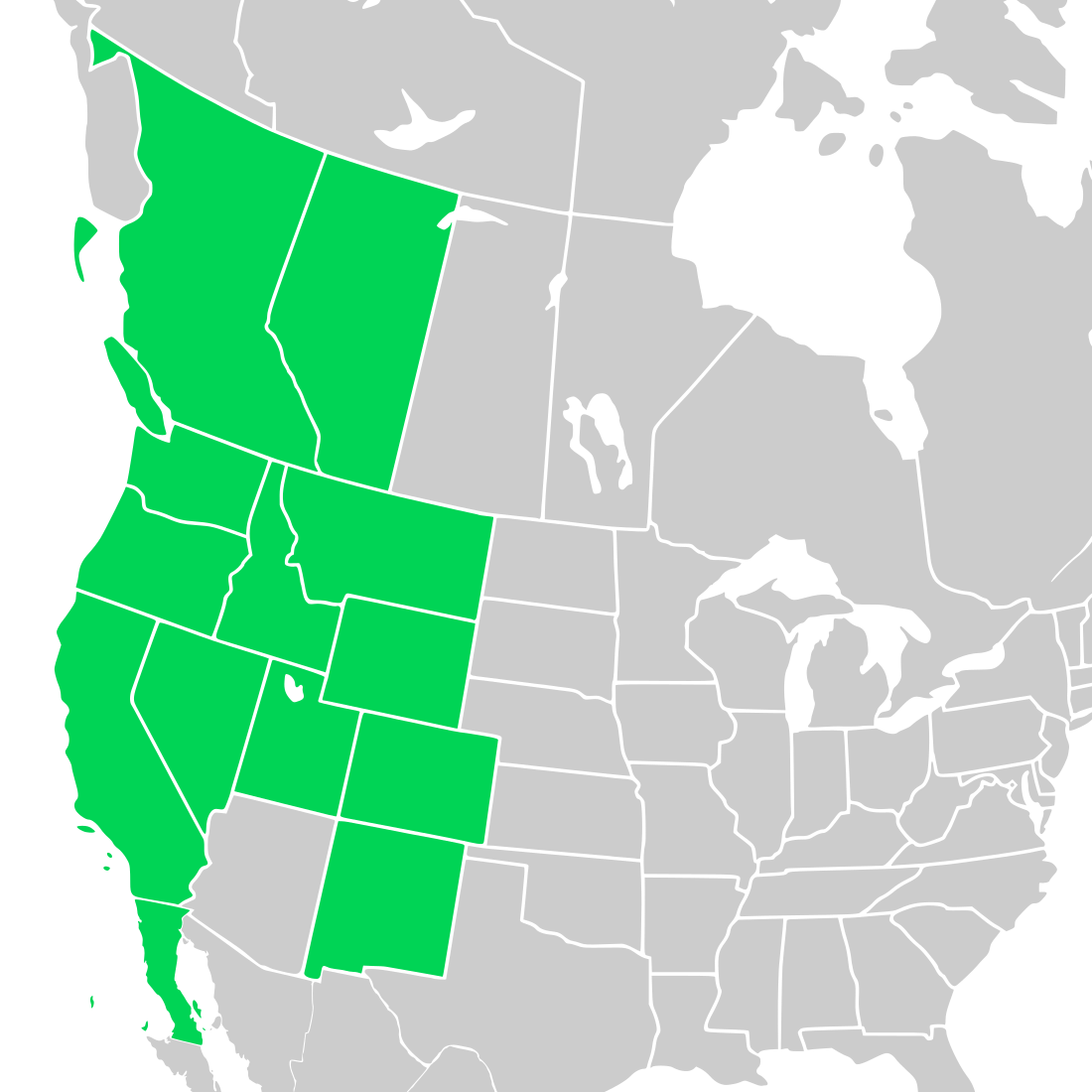
- Native distribution

Synonyms
- Basionym: Aster spathulatus Lindl.; Species: Aster aestivus Rothr.; Aster ascendens var. delectabilis (H.M.Hall) Jeps.; Aster ascendens var. fremontii Torr. & A.Gray; Aster delectabilis H.M.Hall; Aster fremontii A.Gray; Aster fremontii f. pallidus Cockerell; Aster fremontii var. parishii A.Gray; Aster fremontii f. viridus Cockerell; Aster occidentalis Torr. & A.Gray; Aster occidentalis var. delectabilis (H.M.Hall) Ferris; Aster occidentalis var. fremontii (Torr. & A.Gray) A.G.Jones; Aster occidentalis var. parishii (A.Gray) Ferris; Aster occidentalis var. scabriusculus A.Gray; Aster occidentalis var. typicus Cronquist; Symphyotrichum spathulatum var. fremontii (Torr. & A.Gray) G.L.Nesom; Tripolium occidentale Nutt.; Varieties: var. intermedium; Aster occidentalis var. intermedius A.Gray; Aster occidentalis subsp. intermedius (A.Gray) Piper; Aster spathulatus var. intermedius (A.Gray) Cronquist; Aster vallicola Greene; var. yosemitanum; Aster ascendens var. yosemitanus A.Gray; Aster occidentalis var. yosemitanus (A.Gray) Cronquist; Aster paludicola Piper; Aster yosemitanus Greene

= Symphyotrichum spathulatum =

Species of flowering plant

Symphyotrichum spathulatum (formerly Aster spathulatus) is a species of flowering plant in the family Asteraceae native to western North America including northwestern Mexico. Commonly known as western mountain aster, it is a perennial, herbaceous plant that may reach 20 to 80 centimeters (8 to 31 inches) tall. Its flowers, which open in July and August, have violet ray florets and yellow disk florets.

== Description ==
Symphyotrichum spathulatum blooms in July and August and is a colony-forming perennial that grows typically 1–5 hairless or mostly hairless stems from a long rhizome. It ranges from 20 to 80 centimeters (8 to 31 inches) in height and has thin, entire leaves with little to no hair that are 5 to 15 centimeters (2 to 6 inches) long. The leaves are linear or elliptical, narrow, and sometimes obovate at the base of the plant. The upper leaves are shorter at 3 to 6 centimeters (1 1/8 to 2 3/8 inches).

The flower heads grow in corymbiform to paniculiform arrays with little branching. The involucres are 5–10 millimeters (1/5–2/5 inch) and bell-shaped, and their phyllaries are in 3–5 series. There are 15–40 violet ray florets that are 9–15 millimeters (7/20–3/5 inch) long and 1–2 millimeters (1/20–1/10 inch) wide. These surround the flower centers composed of 30–80 (sometimes up to 100) yellow disk florets.

The seeds are brown, hairy cypselae 2.5–3.5 mm (1/10–3/20 in) long with about 4 nerves and white pappi that are 5–7 millimeters (1/5–3/10 inch) long.

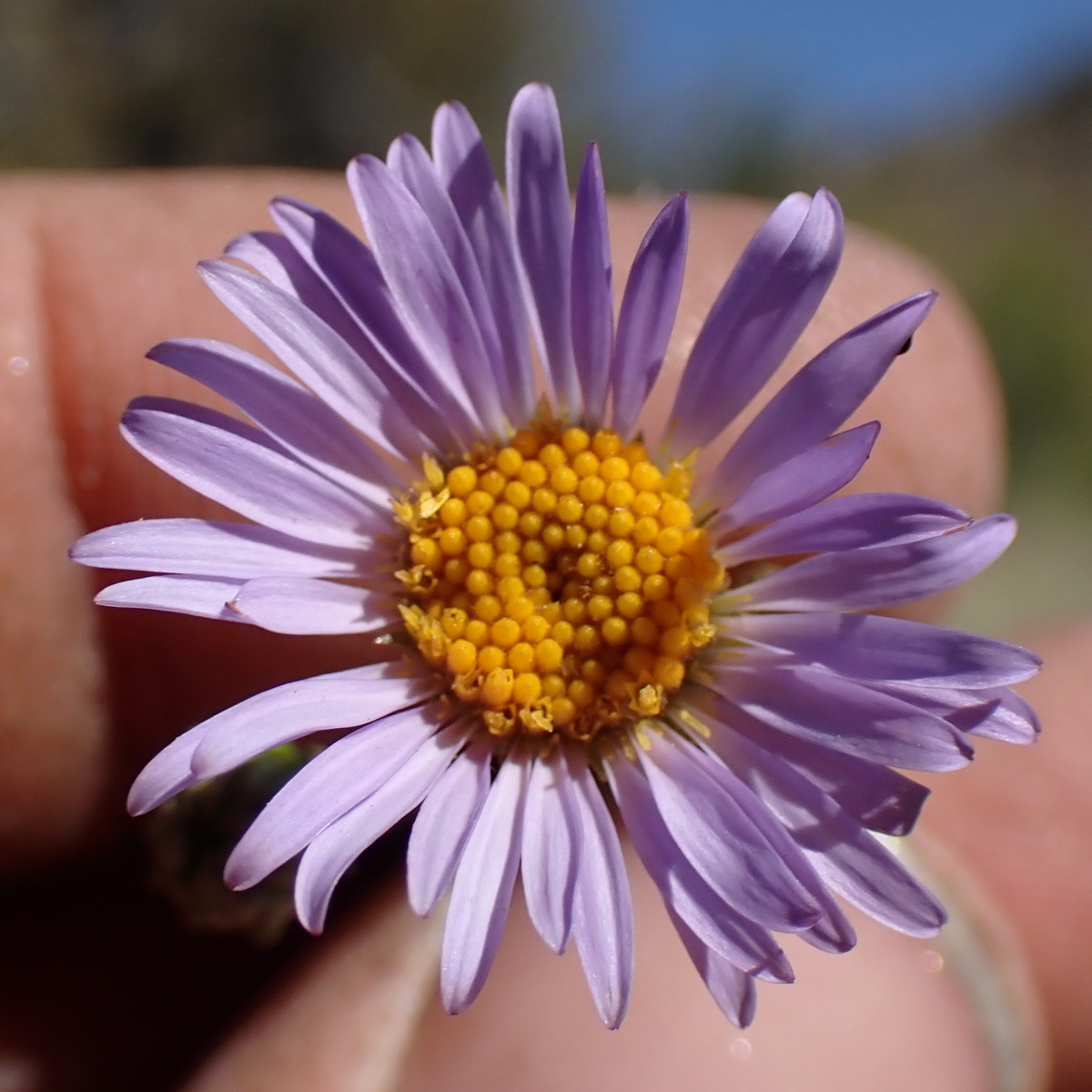

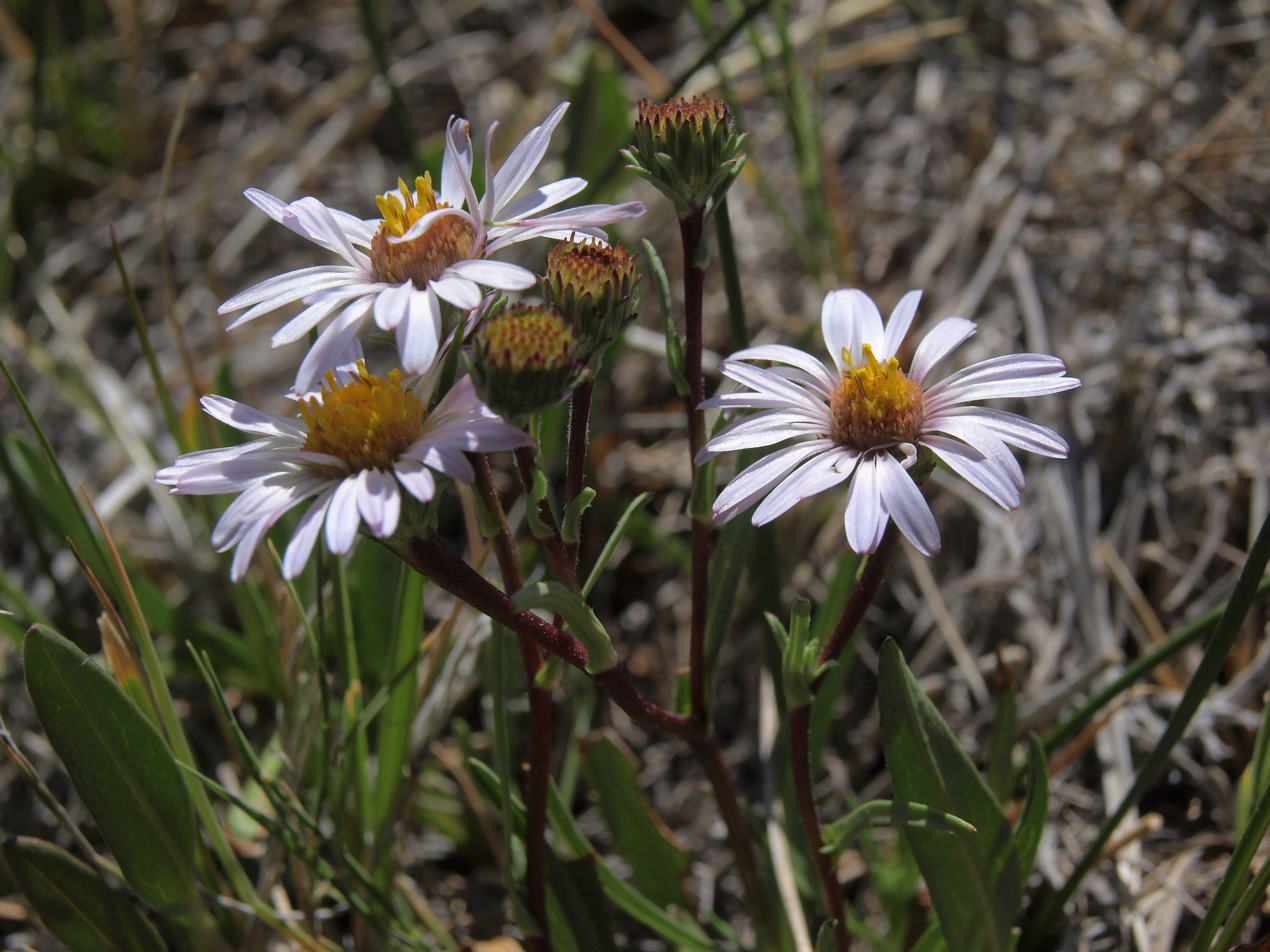

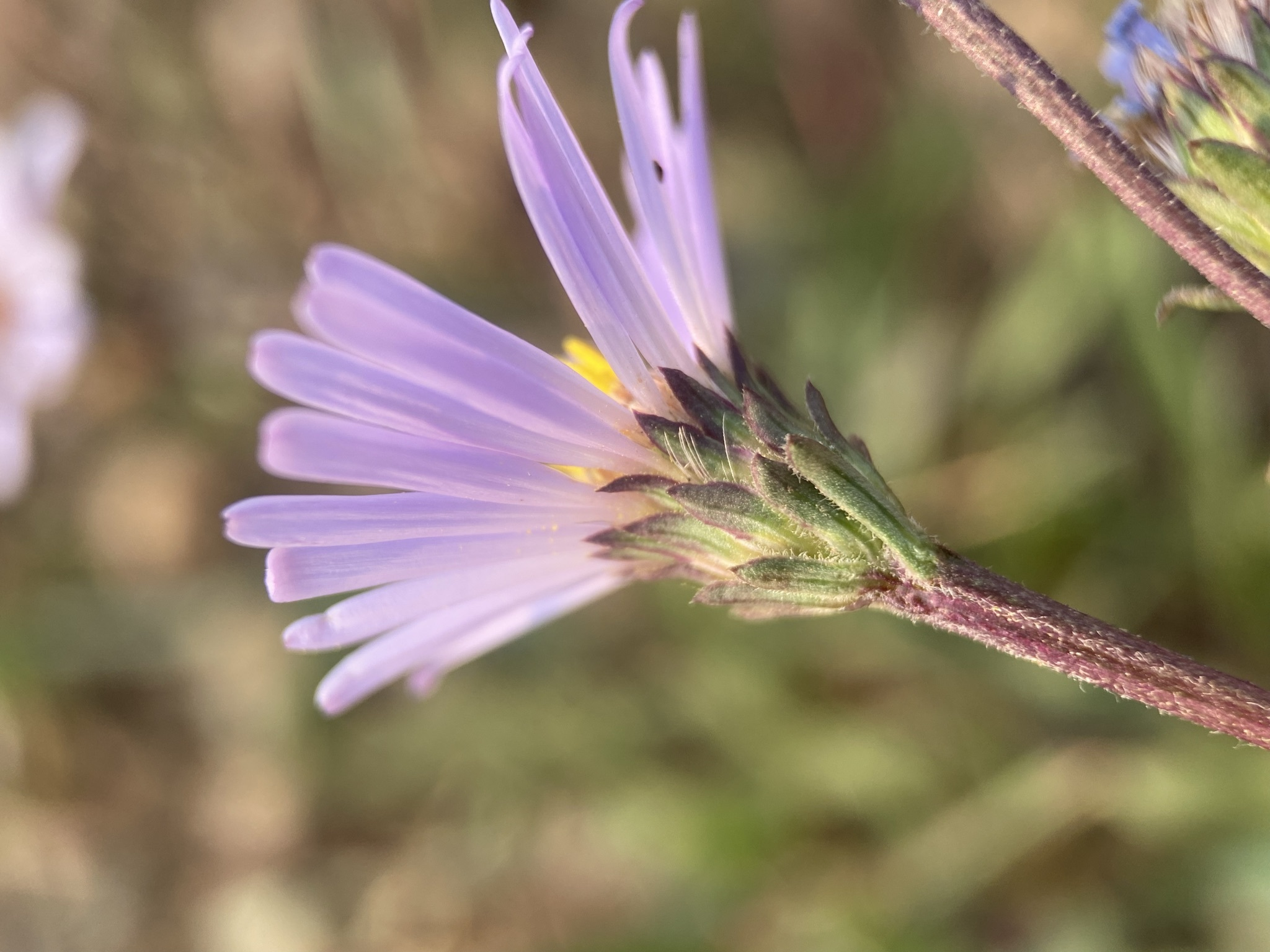

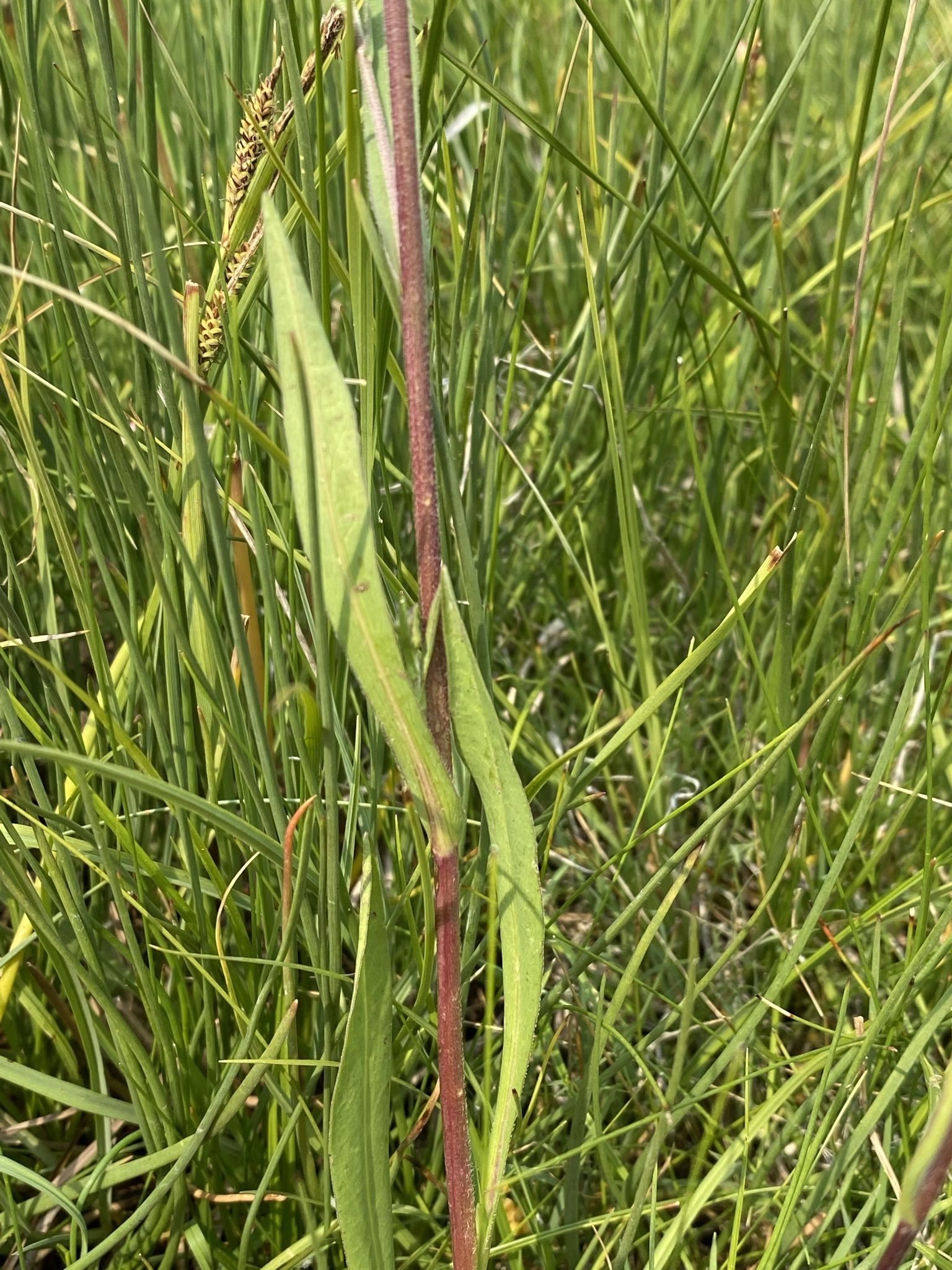

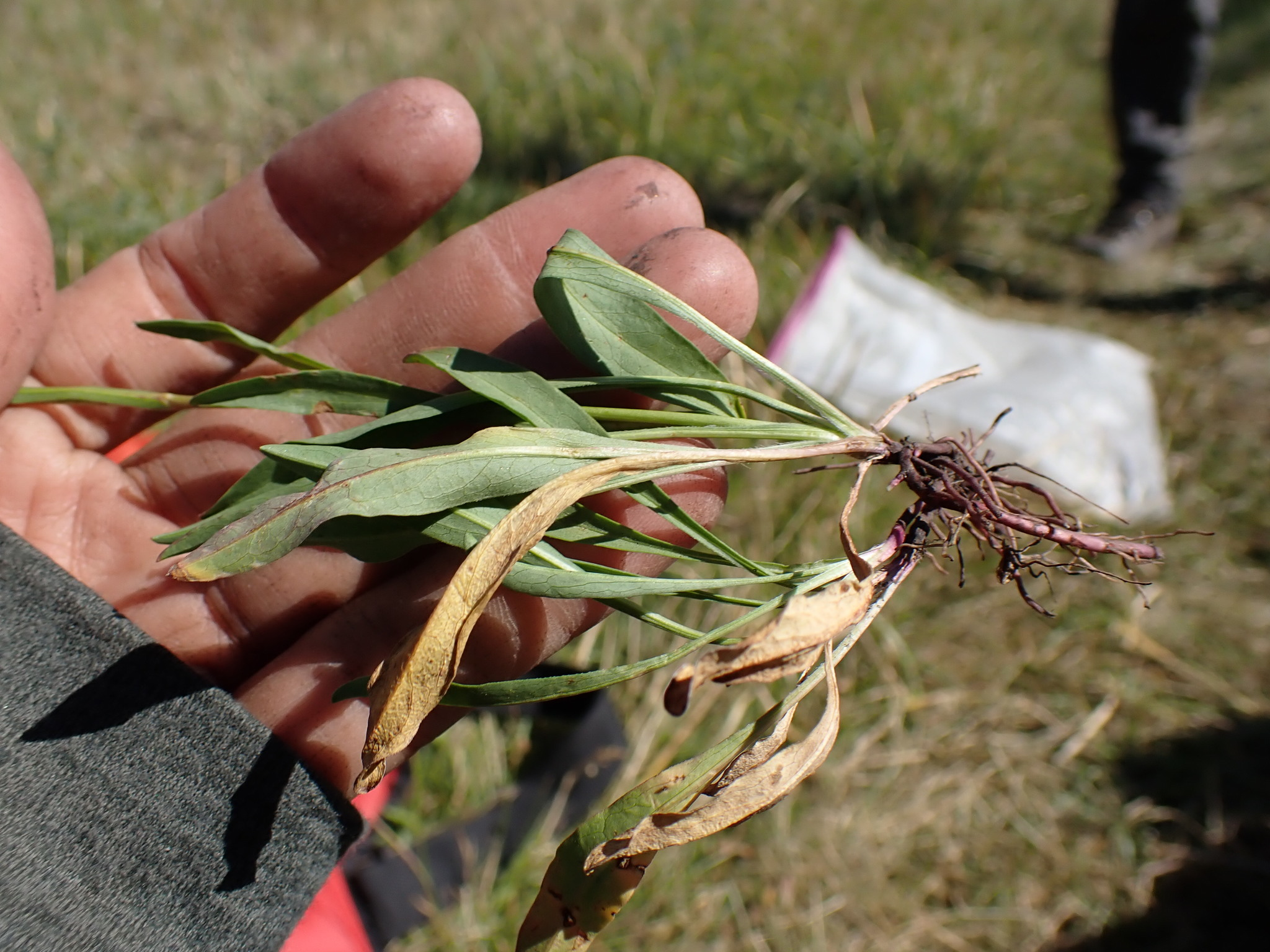

=== Chromosomes ===
Symphyotrichum spathulatum has a base number of x = 8. Diploid, tetraploid, hexaploid, and octaploid cytotypes with respective chromosome counts of 16, 32, 48, and 64 have been reported, depending upon the infraspecies, as follows:

- S. spathulatum var. spathulatum: 2n = 2x = 16, 2n = 4x = 32, 2n = 6x = 48, and 2n = 8x = 64
- S. spathulatum var. intermedium: 2n = 4x = 32, 2n = 6x = 48, and 2n = 8x = 64
- S. spathulatum var. yosemitanum: 2n = 2x = 16, 2n = 4x = 32

== Taxonomy ==
Symphyotrichum spathulatum is one of the species within Symphyotrichum sect. Occidentales. (Note: Occidentales is listed as a section in Flora of Missouri, whereas on Canadian botanist John C. Semple's Astereae Lab website, it is given as a subsection of section Symphyotrichum.) S. spathulatum was first formally described by John Lindley in 1834 as Aster spathulatus.

Three varieties of Symphyotrichum spathulatum are recognized, including the autonym:

- S. spathulatum var. spathulatum
- S. spathulatum var. intermedium
- S. spathulatum var. yosemitanum

S. spathulatum is one of the parents of the two allopolyploidal Symphyotrichum species S. ascendens and S. defoliatum.

== Distribution and habitat ==
Symphyotrichum spathulatum is found in the western United States, western Canada, and northwestern Mexico. It is native to British Columbia and Alberta in Canada, and in the United States from Washington state east to Montana, south to New Mexico, west to California, and north again to Oregon. There is no recorded presence in Arizona. In Mexico, it is native to the states bordering the Gulf of California. It grows at 1,200–2,900 meters (3,900–9,500 feet) (or lower) in meadows on mountain slopes and open aspen and coniferous forests.

S. spathulatum var. intermedium is native to British Columbia, California, Idaho, Nevada, Oregon, and Washington state, only occasionally being found in California and Nevada. It grows at 1,200–2,200 m (3,900–7,200 ft) in grasslands and meadows on mountain slopes and in open coniferous forests.

S. spathulatum var. yosemitanum is restricted from southern Oregon to the Sierra Nevada of California. It can be found at 1,200–2,200 m (3,900–7,200 ft) in oak woodlands and coniferous forests.

== Conservation ==
As of July 2021, NatureServe listed Symphyotrichum spathulatum as Secure (G5) worldwide and Possibly Extirpated (SX) in Alberta. S. spathulatum var. intermedium and S. spathulatum var. spathulatum were reported as Secure Varieties (T5), and no status rank was given for S. spathulatum var. yosemitanum.
