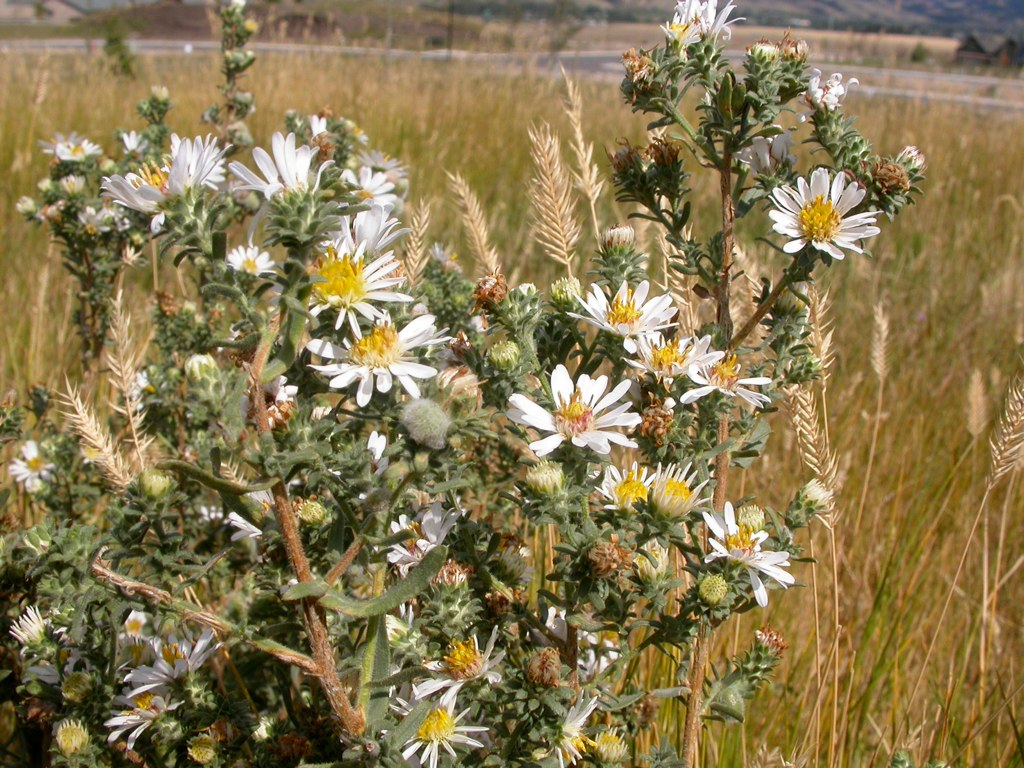

Conservation status
- Secure (NatureServe)

Scientific classification
- Kingdom: Plantae
- Clade: Tracheophytes
- Clade: Angiosperms
- Clade: Eudicots
- Clade: Asterids
- Order: Asterales
- Family: Asteraceae
- Genus: Symphyotrichum
- Subgenus: Symphyotrichum subg. Virgulus
- Species: S. falcatum

Binomial name
- Symphyotrichum falcatum (Lindl.) G.L.Nesom

Varieties
- S. falcatum var. falcatum; S. falcatum var. commutatum (Torr. & A.Gray) G.L.Nesom
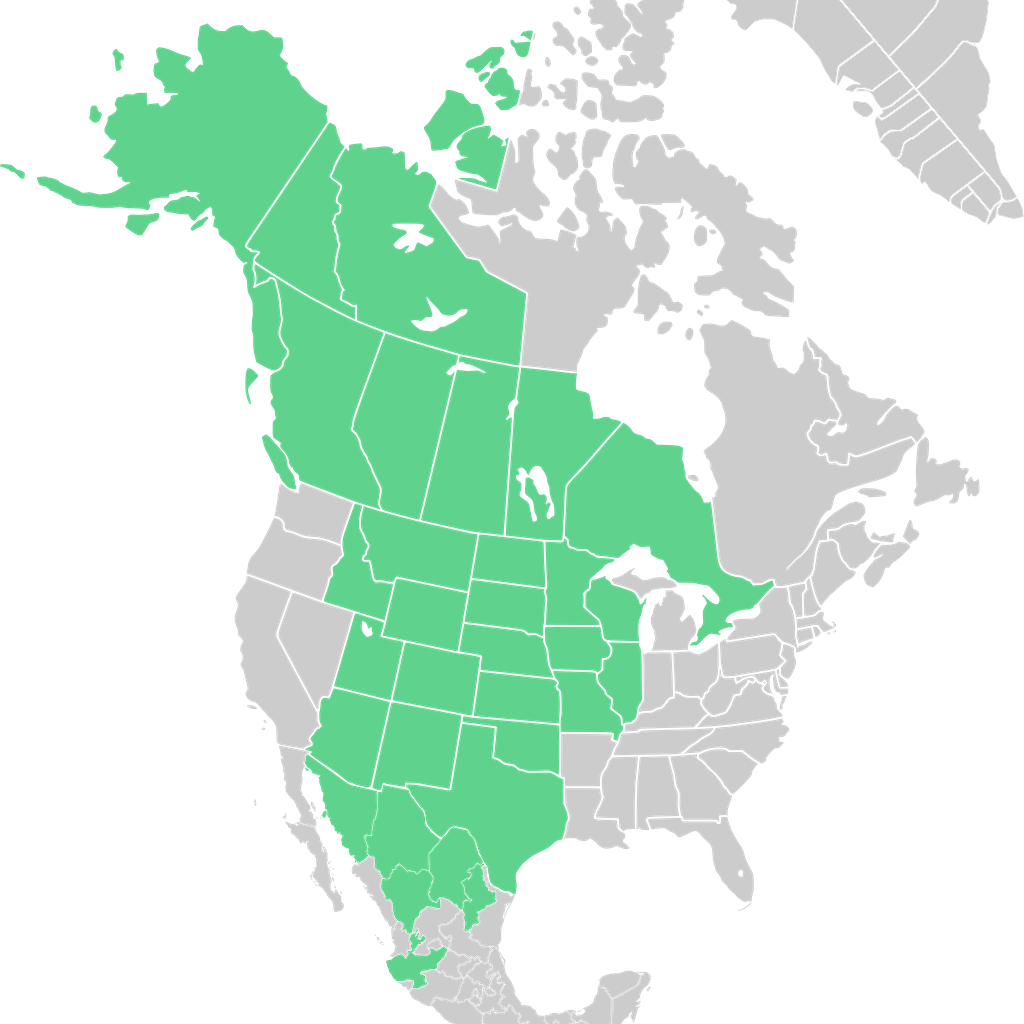
- Native distribution

Synonyms
- Basionym: Aster falcatus Lindl.; Species: Aster elegantulus A.E.Porsild; Aster ramulosus Lindl.; Haplopappus falcatus S.F.Blake; Lasallea falcata (Lindl.) Semple & Brouillet; Stenotus falcatus Rydb.; Venatris falcata Raf.; Virgulus falcatus (Lindl.) Reveal & Keener; var. commutatum: Aster commutatus (Torr. & A.Gray) A.Gray; Aster commutatus var. crassulus (Rydb.) S.F.Blake; Aster cordineri A.Nelson; Aster crassulus Rydb.; Aster ericoides var. commutatus (Torr. & A.Gray) B.Boivin; Aster falcatus var. commutatus (Torr. & A.Gray) A.G.Jones; Aster falcatus subsp. commutatus (Torr. & A.Gray) A.G.Jones; Aster falcatus var. crassulus (Rydb.) Cronquist; Aster incanopilosus E.Sheld.; Aster multiflorus var. commutatus Torr. & A.Gray; Symphyotrichum falcatum subsp. commutatum (Torr. & A.Gray) Semple; Symphyotrichum falcatum var. crassulum (Rydb.) G.L.Nesom; Virgulus falcatus var. commutatus (Torr. & A.Gray) Schaack & Windham

= Symphyotrichum falcatum =

Species of plant in the aster family

Symphyotrichum falcatum (formerly Aster falcatus) is a species of flowering plant in the family Asteraceae. Commonly called white prairie aster and western heath aster, it is native to a widespread area of central and western North America.

== Description ==
White prairie aster blooms July–November depending on variety and location. It is colonial or cespitose and grows 10–80 centimeters (4–31 inches) tall. It has hairy stems and hairy, grayish-green and firm entire leaves.

On the outside of the flower heads of all members of the family Asteraceae are small specialized leaves called "phyllaries", and together they form the involucre that protects the individual flowers in the head before they open. (Note: See Asteracae § Flowers for more detail.) The involucres of S. falcatum are campanulate (bell-shaped) and usually 5–8 mm (1/4–3/8 in) long. The outer phyllaries are spreading to reflexed (bent sharply backwards) and oblanceolate to spatulate in shape. The inner phyllaries are linear-lanceolate. They are in 3–4 unequal rows, meaning they are staggered and do not end at the same point.

The flower heads have 15–35 usually white ray florets, sometimes blue or pink, that are typically 18–30 millimeters (3/4–1 1/8 inches) long. These surround a center of roughly the same number of disk florets that start as yellow and become brown with age.

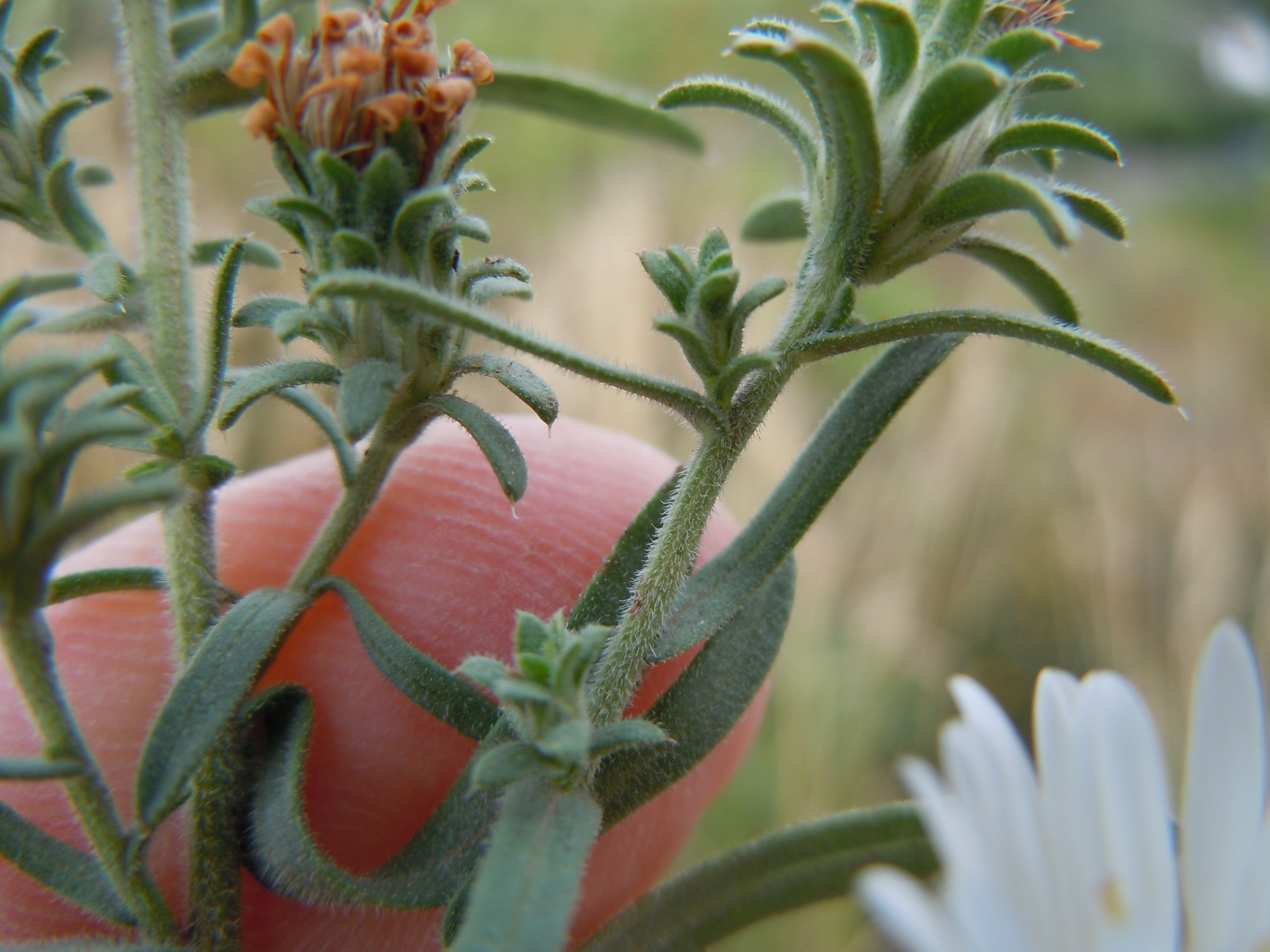
Bracts, involucres, and phyllaries

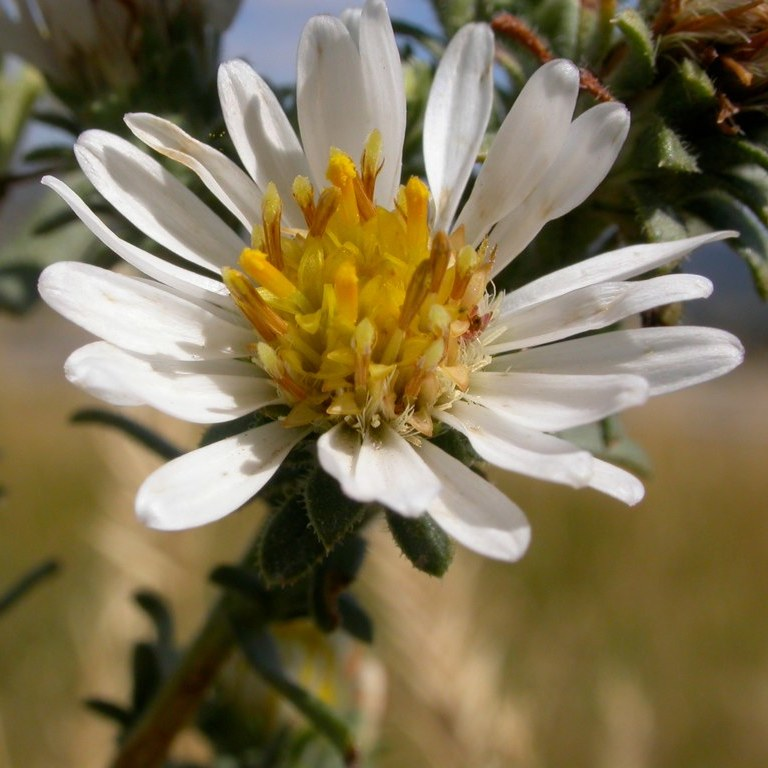
Close-up of ray and disk florets

=== Chromosomes ===
Symphyotrichum falcatum has a base number of x = 5. Diploid, tetraploid, and hexaploid cytotypes with respective chromosome counts of 10, 20, and 30 have been reported, depending upon the infraspecies, as follows:

- S. spathulatum var. falcatum: 2n = 2x = 10, 2n = 4x = 20, and 2n = 6x = 30.
- S. spathulatum var. commutatum: 2n = 6x = 30.

== Taxonomy ==
Symphyotrichum falcatum is one of the two species within Symphyotrichum sect. Ericoidei. The other is S. ericoides. The species was first formally described by John Lindley in 1834 as Aster falcatus.

Two varieties are recognized:

- S. falcatum var. falcatum, cespitose with up to ten stems from caudices, and known commonly as white prairie aster, western heath aster, creeping white prairie aster, falcate aster, and little grey aster.
- S. falcatum var. commutatum, communal with stems growing from rhizomes. Common names of this variety include white prairie aster, western heath aster, and little grey aster, as well as cluster aster.

S. falcatum is one of the parents of the two allopolyploidal Symphyotrichum species S. ascendens and S. defoliatum.

== Distribution and habitat ==
S. falcatum var. falcatum is native from Alaska, Yukon, and Northwest Territories in the north, western Canada from British Columbia to Manitoba, in the United States from Idaho east to Minnesota, west to Wyoming and south to New Mexico and Arizona, then north to Utah. It is also native to northern Mexico.

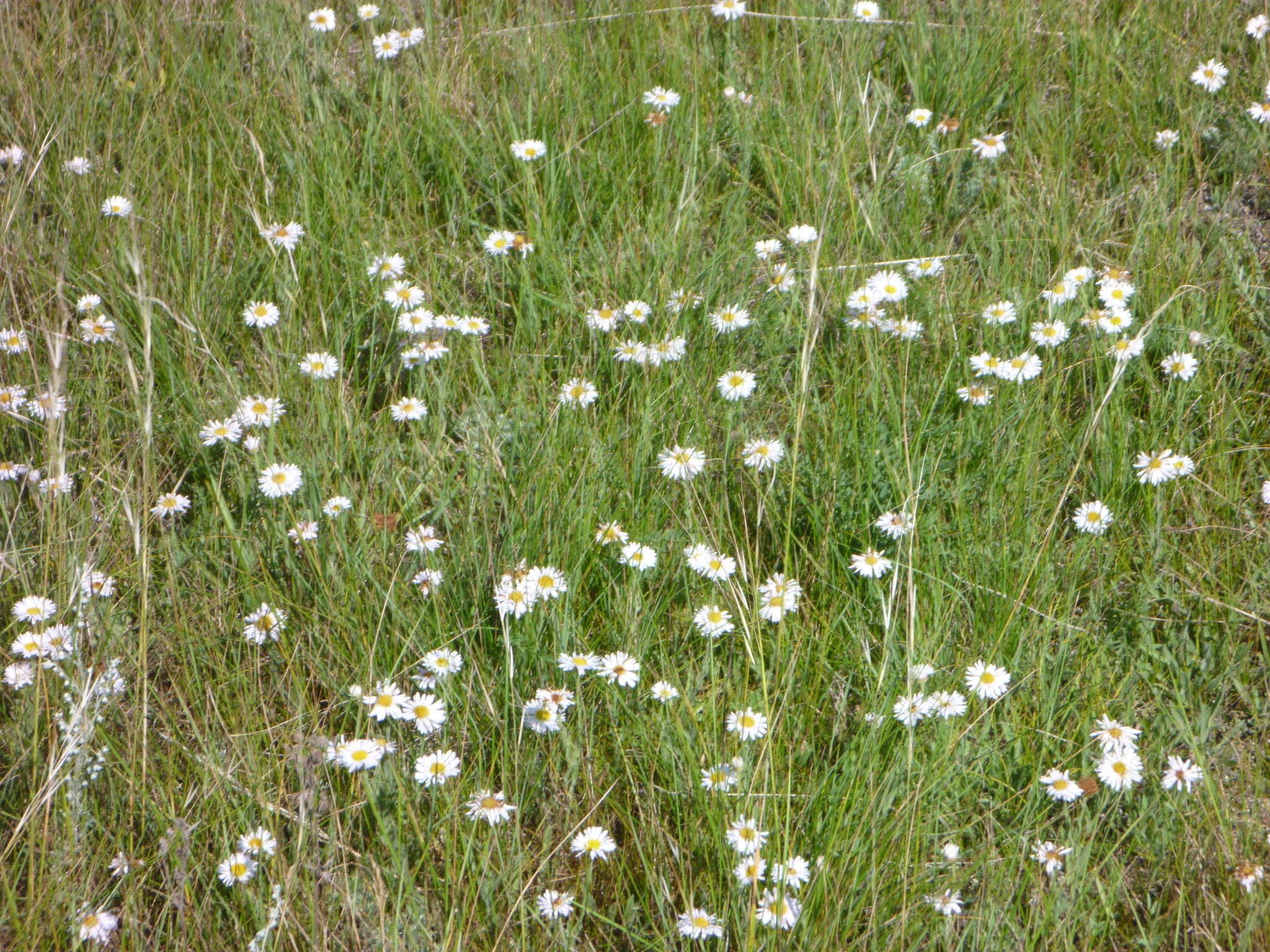
S. falcatum in a meadow

S. falcatum var. commutatum has no subarctic presence, extends farther east into Ontario, the South Central and upper Midwestern United States, and farther south in Mexico.

== Conservation ==
NatureServe lists it as Secure (G5) worldwide, Critically Imperiled (S1) in Alaska, Imperiled (S2) in Manitoba, Vulnerable (S3) in Yukon, and Possibly Extirpated (SH) in Iowa. It is an exotic species in Ontario, Missouri, and Massachusetts.

== Uses ==
The Zuni people call S. falcatum var. commutatum by the name ha'mopiawe and mix the ground blossoms with yucca suds to wash newborn infants. Quoting American ethnologist Matilda Coxe Stevenson:

The blossoms, ground to a fine meal, are sprinkled into a bowl of yucca suds used for bathing a new-born infant. This medicine is said to make the hair grow on the head and to give strength to the body. The remedy belongs to all women.

The Ramah Navajo use the plant in a decoction to make a lotion as a remedy for snake bites.
