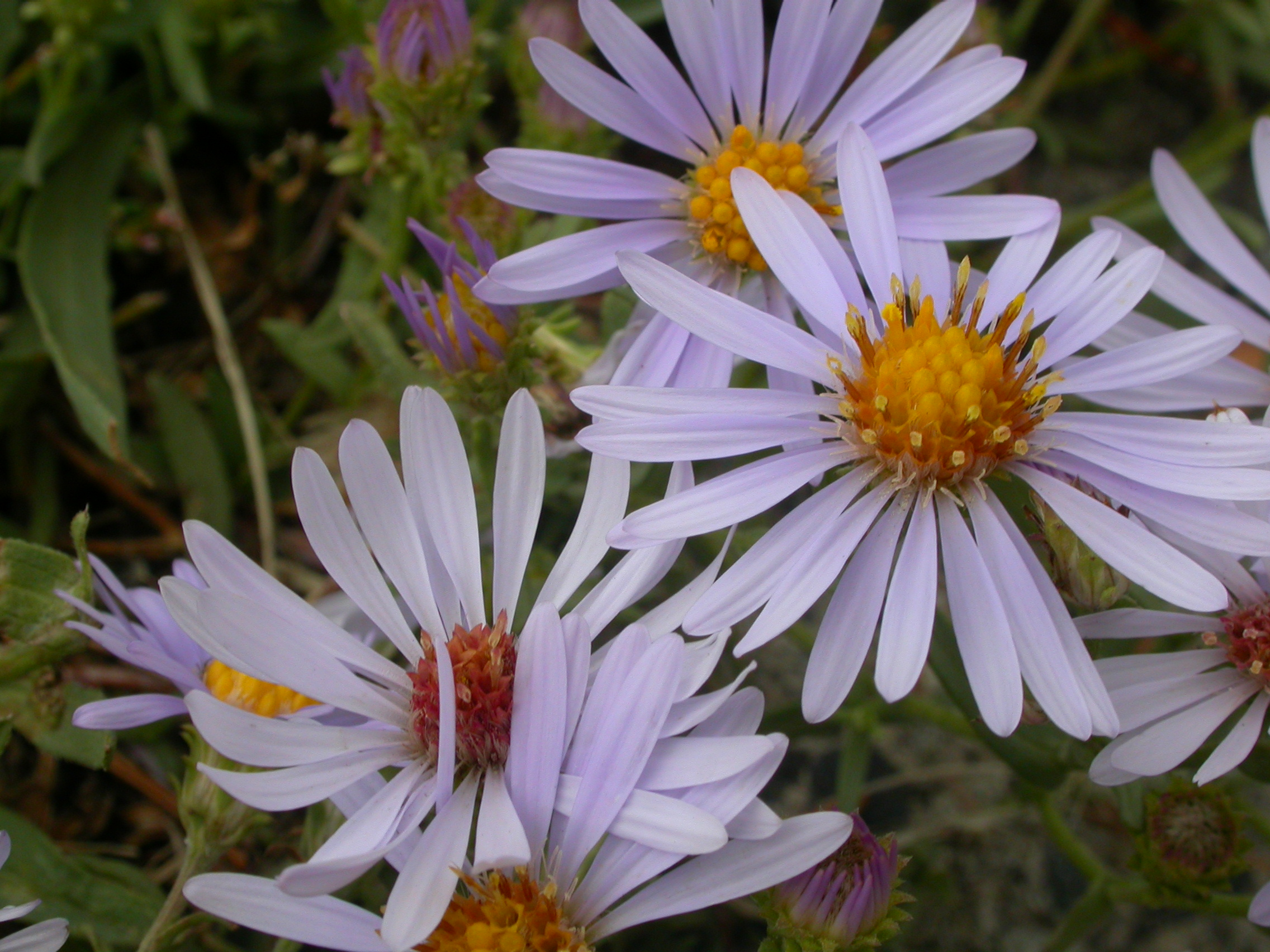
- Symphyotrichum ascendes

Conservation status
- Secure (NatureServe)

Scientific classification
- Kingdom: Plantae
- Clade: Tracheophytes
- Clade: Angiosperms
- Clade: Eudicots
- Clade: Asterids
- Order: Asterales
- Family: Asteraceae
- Tribe: Astereae
- Subtribe: Symphyotrichinae
- Genus: Symphyotrichum
- Subgenus: Symphyotrichum subg. Ascendentes
- Species: S. ascendens

Binomial name
- Symphyotrichum ascendens (Lindl.) G.L.Nesom
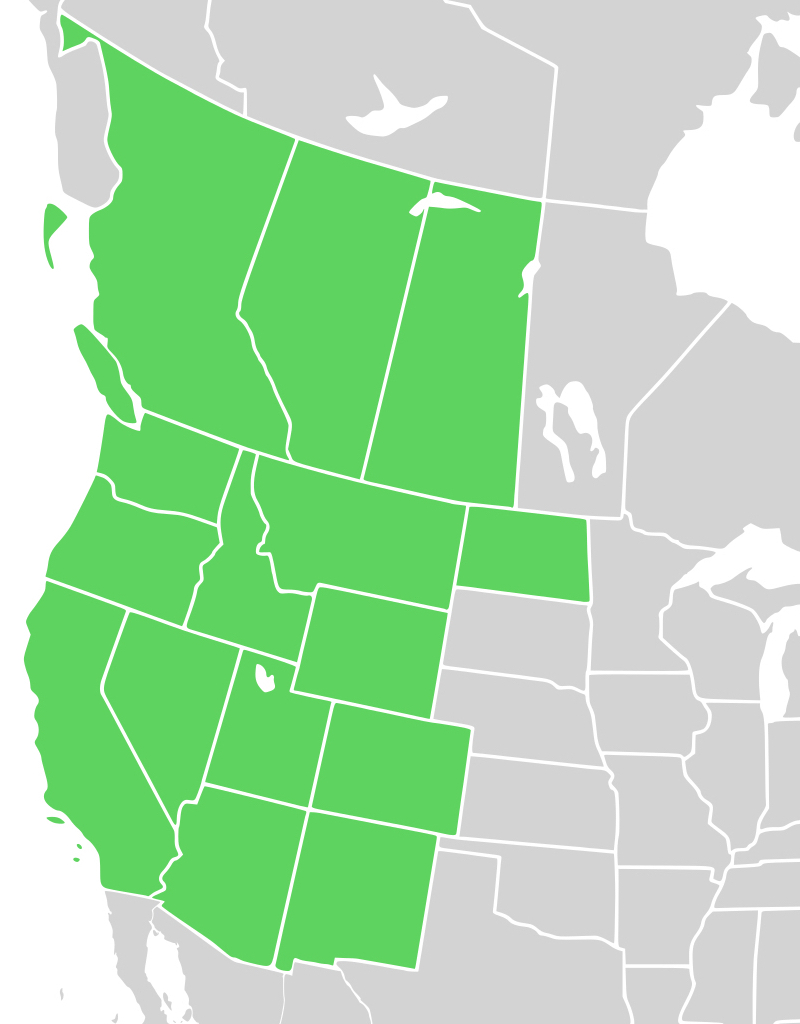
- Native distribution by state and province

Synonyms
- Basionym: Aster ascendens Lindl.; Alphabetical list: Aster adscendens Lindl. ex DC.; Aster armeriifolius Greene; Aster ascendens var. armeriifolius A.Nelson; Aster ascendens var. ciliatifolius (Nutt.) Torr. & A.Gray; Aster ascendens var. denudatus (Nutt.) Torr. & A.Gray; Aster chilensis subsp. adscendens (Lindl. ex DC.) Cronquist; Aster chilensis var. euadscendens Cronquist; Aster denudatus Nutt.; Aster denudatus var. ciliatifolius Nutt.; Aster griseus Greene; Aster lonchophyllus Greene; Aster macounii Rydb.; Aster nuttallii Torr. & A.Gray; Aster ramulosus Nutt.; Aster subgriseus Rydb.; Virgulaster ascendens (Lindl.) Semple

= Symphyotrichum ascendens =

Species of flowering plant

Symphyotrichum ascendens (formerly Aster ascendens) is a species of flowering plant in the family Asteraceae known by the common names western aster, long-leaved aster, and Rocky Mountain aster. Blooming July–September, it is native to western North America and can be found at elevations of 500–3,200 m (1,600–10,500 ft) in several habitats.

== Description ==
Symphyotrichum ascendens is a rhizomatous, perennial, and herbaceous plant growing a branching, erect stem to heights between 20 and 60 centimeters (8 and 24 inches). Leaves are widely lance-shaped to oblong and pointed, the largest ones near the base of the stem reaching up to 15 cm (6 in) long. The stem and leaves are roughly hairy in places.

The inflorescence is an array of many flower heads with many narrow violet to nearly white ray florets around a center of golden disc florets that open July–September. The fruit is a hairy cypsela with a long pappus. S. ascendens is similar to Symphyotrichum chilense, which has smaller flower heads.

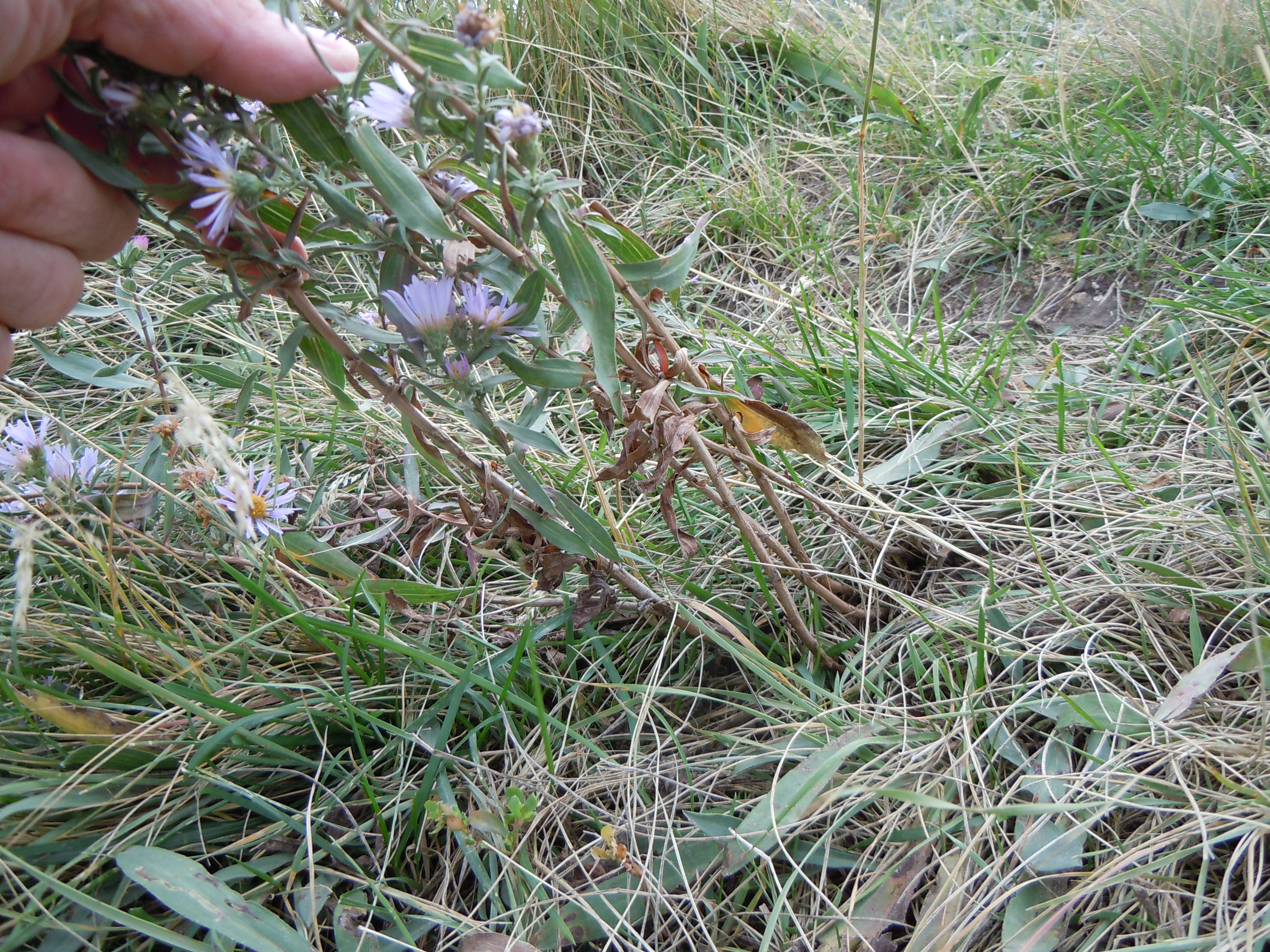
Stems

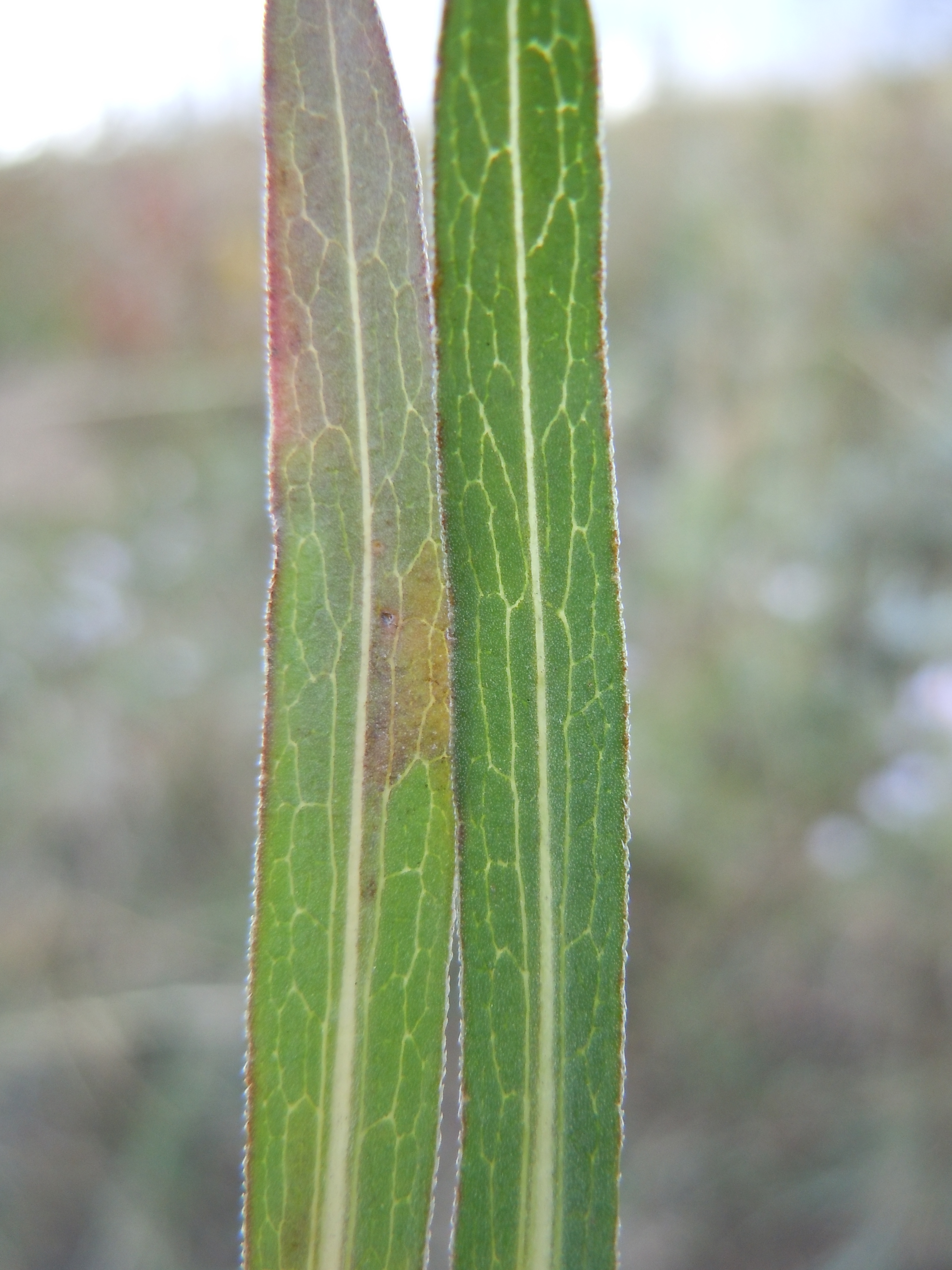
Leaves

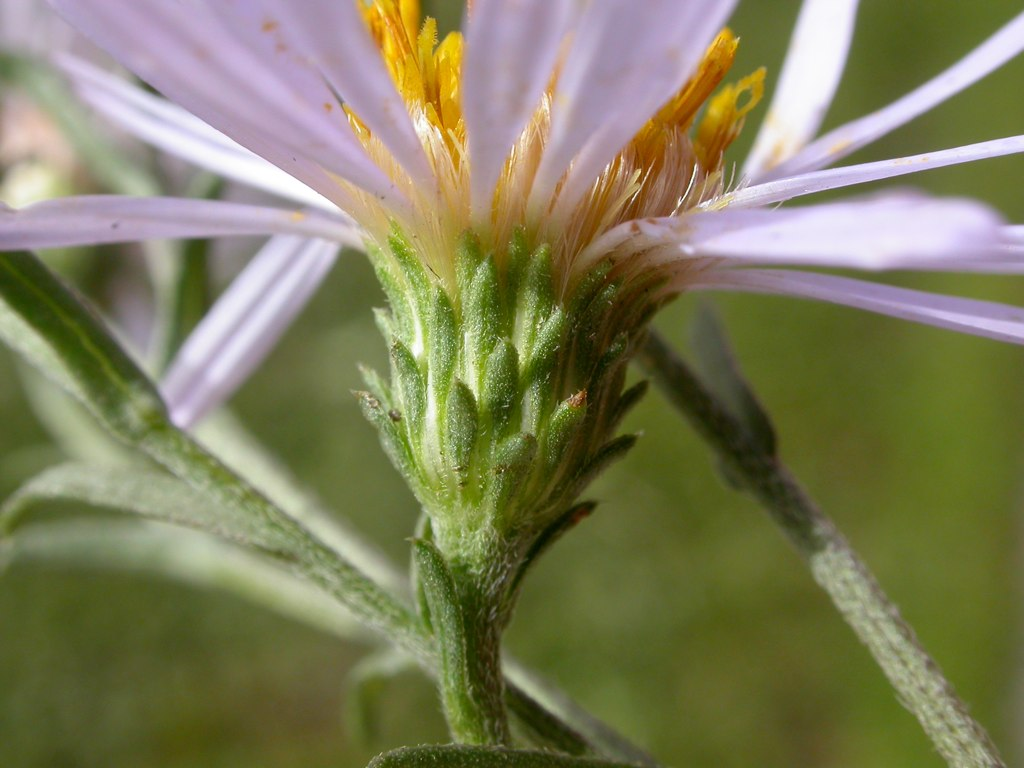
Involucre and phyllaries

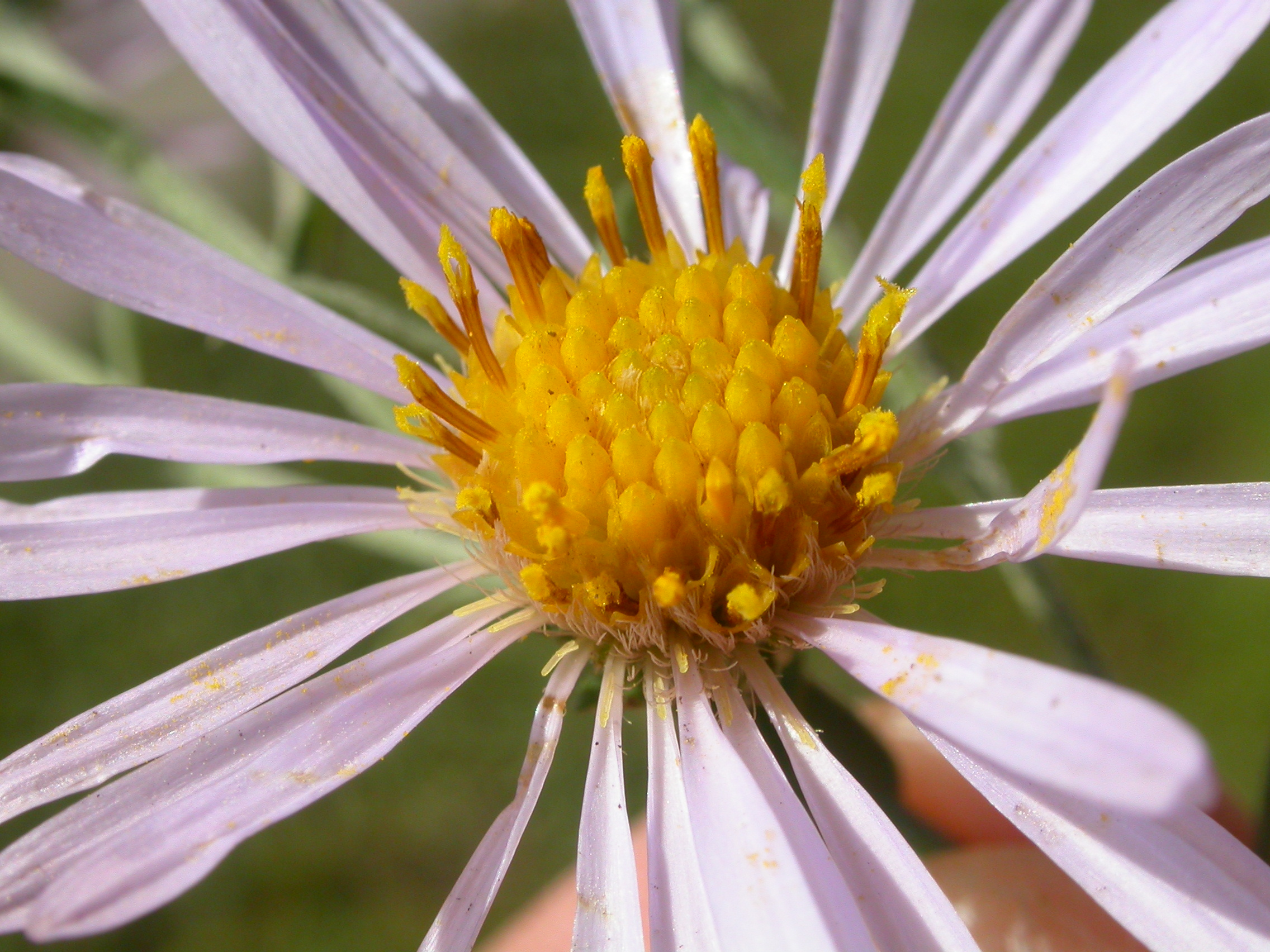
Ray and disk florets

=== Chromosomes ===
Symphyotrichum ascendens has a chromosome base number of x = 13. There are diploid individuals (2n = 26) which occur in the western portion of its range, and tetraploid ones (2n = 52) found eastward.

== Taxonomy ==
S. ascendens is a member of the genus Symphyotrichum, sometimes called American-asters, classified in the subgenus Ascendentes. Its basionym (original scientific name) is Aster ascendens Lindl., and it has many taxonomic synonyms. Its name with author citations is Symphyotrichum ascendens (Lindl.) G.L.Nesom. In 1834, English botanist John Lindley formally described the plant that now is named Symphyotrichum ascendens.

This species is allopolyploid, derived from the hybridization of S. spathulatum (chromosome base number x = 8) with S. falcatum (x = 5), each from a different subgenus, Symphyotrichum and Virgulus, respectively. This produced a plant with a unique base number of x = 13, also written x_{2} = 13 (8 + 5), and it warranted its own subgenus, Ascendentes, and its own species name. One other species is placed within subgenus Ascendentes: S. defoliatum.

== Distribution and habitat ==
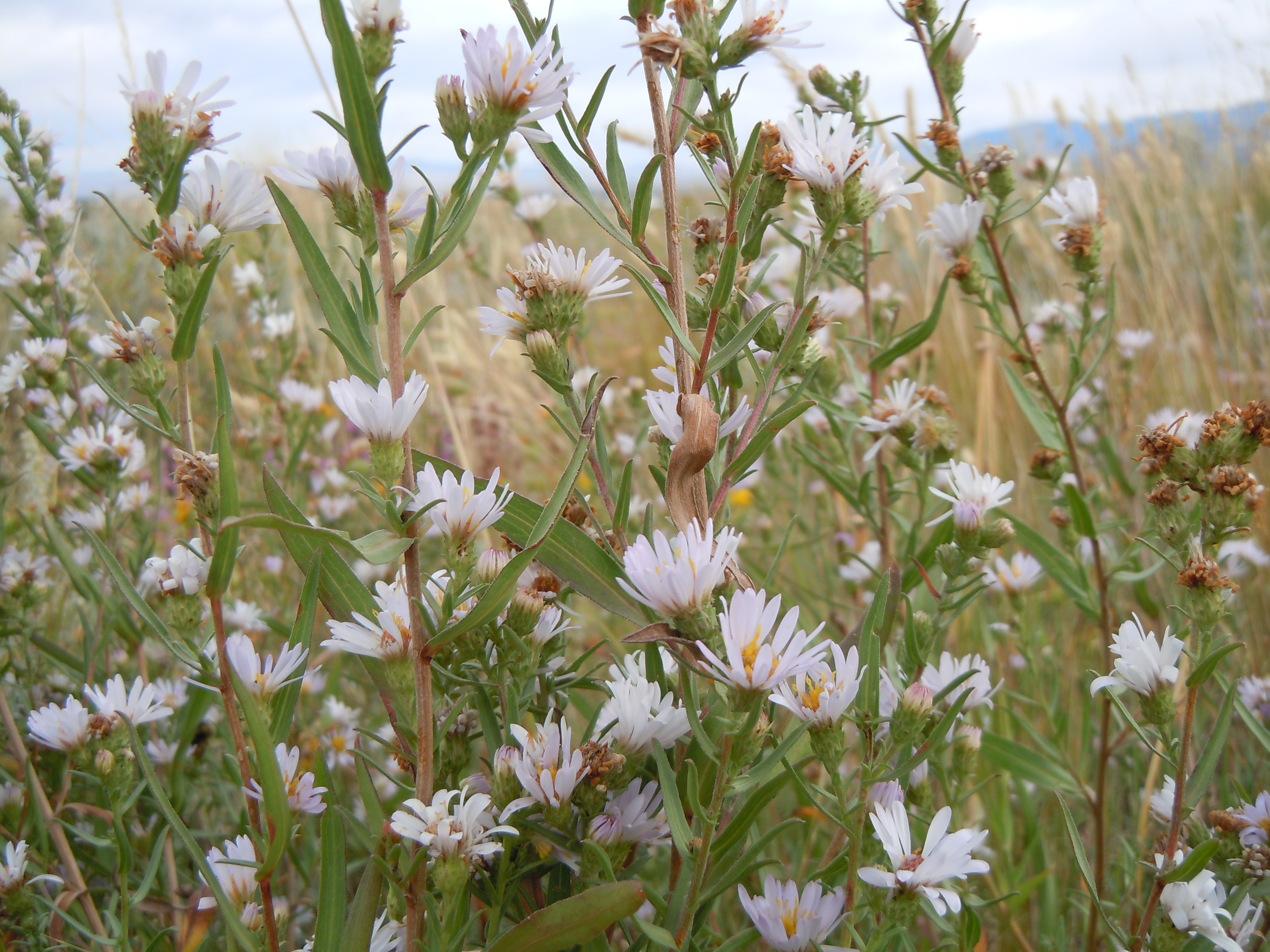
Growing in a field

Western aster is native to western North America from British Columbia to Saskatchewan, south to the United States in Montana and North Dakota then south to New Mexico, west to California, north to Washington state, and all states in between. It can be found at elevations of 500–3,200 meters (1,600–10,500 feet) in several habitats including grasslands, sagebrush steppe, and meadows.
