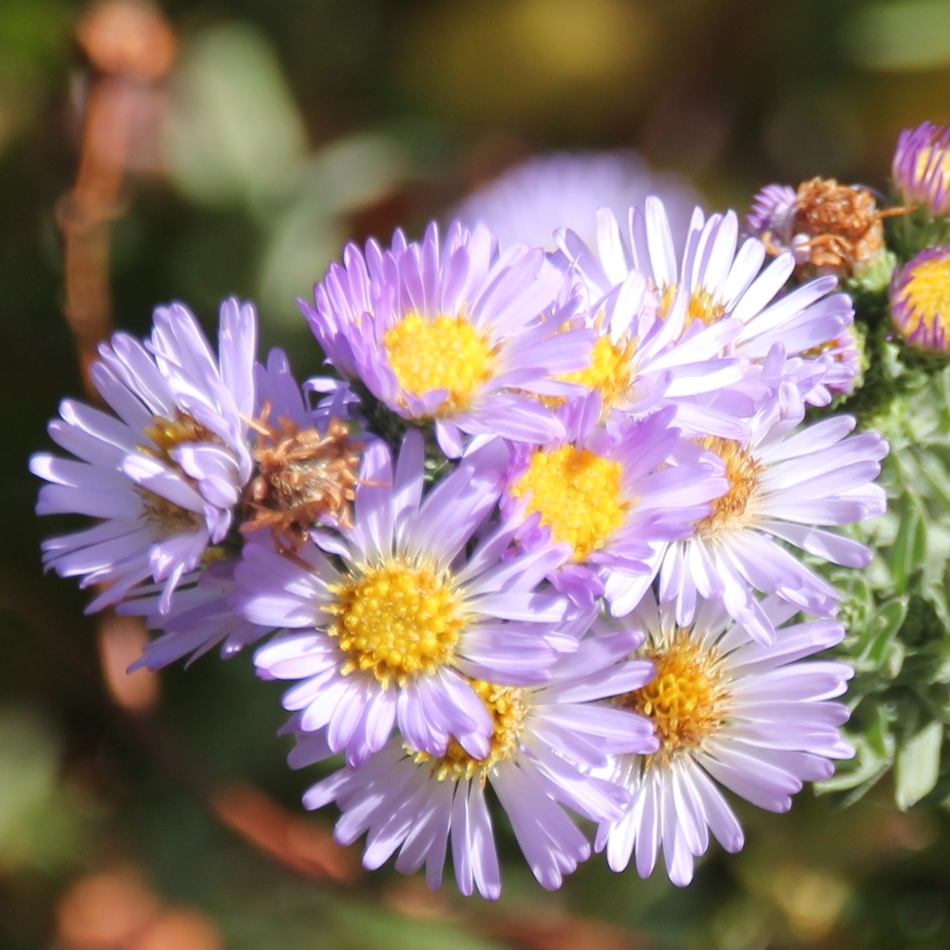

Conservation status
- Imperiled (NatureServe)

Scientific classification
- Kingdom: Plantae
- Clade: Tracheophytes
- Clade: Angiosperms
- Clade: Eudicots
- Clade: Asterids
- Order: Asterales
- Family: Asteraceae
- Tribe: Astereae
- Subtribe: Symphyotrichinae
- Genus: Symphyotrichum
- Subgenus: Symphyotrichum subg. Ascendentes
- Species: S. defoliatum

Binomial name
- Symphyotrichum defoliatum (Parish) G.L.Nesom
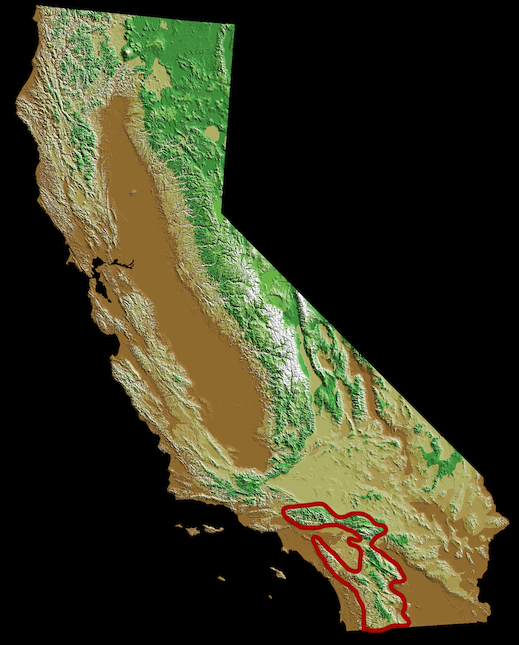
- Endemic range in California outlined in red

Synonyms
- Basionym: Aster defoliatus Parish; Alphabetical list: Aster bernardinus H.M.Hall; Aster chilensis var. bernardinus (H.M.Hall) Cronquist; Aster deserticola J.F.Macbr.; Aster menziesii var. bernardinus (H.M.Hall) Jeps.; Virgulaster bernardinus (H.M.Hall) Semple

= Symphyotrichum defoliatum =

Species of flowering plant

Symphyotrichum defoliatum (formerly Aster bernardinus and Aster defoliatus) is a species of flowering plant in the family Asteraceae known by the common name San Bernardino aster. It is endemic to Southern California where it grows in grasslands and meadows, and it is of conservation concern.

== Description ==
Symphyotrichum defoliatum is a perennial herbaceous plant growing from a long rhizome to a maximum height of 150 centimeters (5 feet). Leaves are widely lance-shaped to oblong and pointed, the largest ones near the base of the stem reaching up to 12 centimeters (4 3/4 inches) long. The stem and leaves are roughly hairy. The inflorescence is an array of flower heads with 15–40 pale violet ray florets around a center of golden disk florets. The fruit is a hairy cypsela with a long pappus.

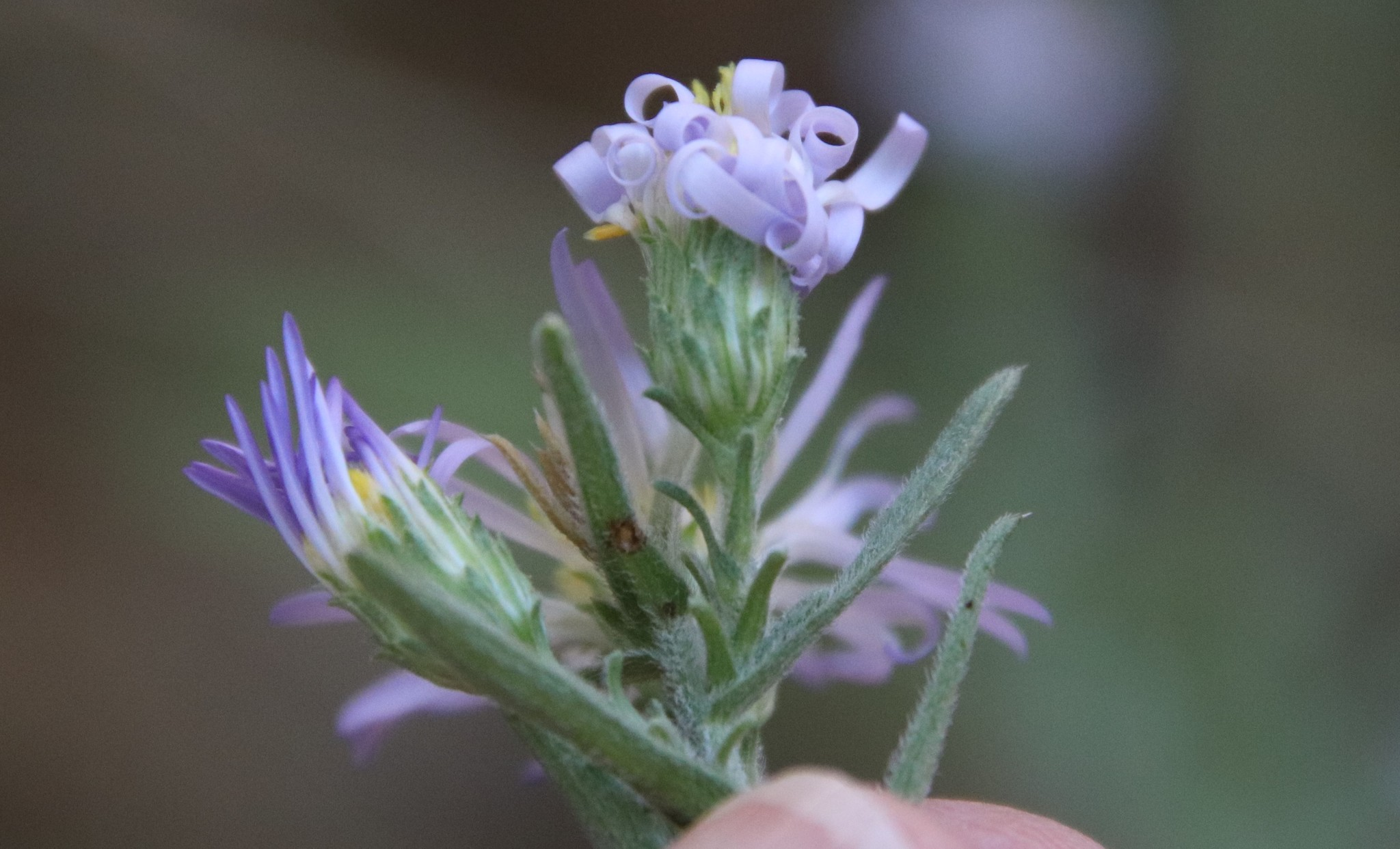

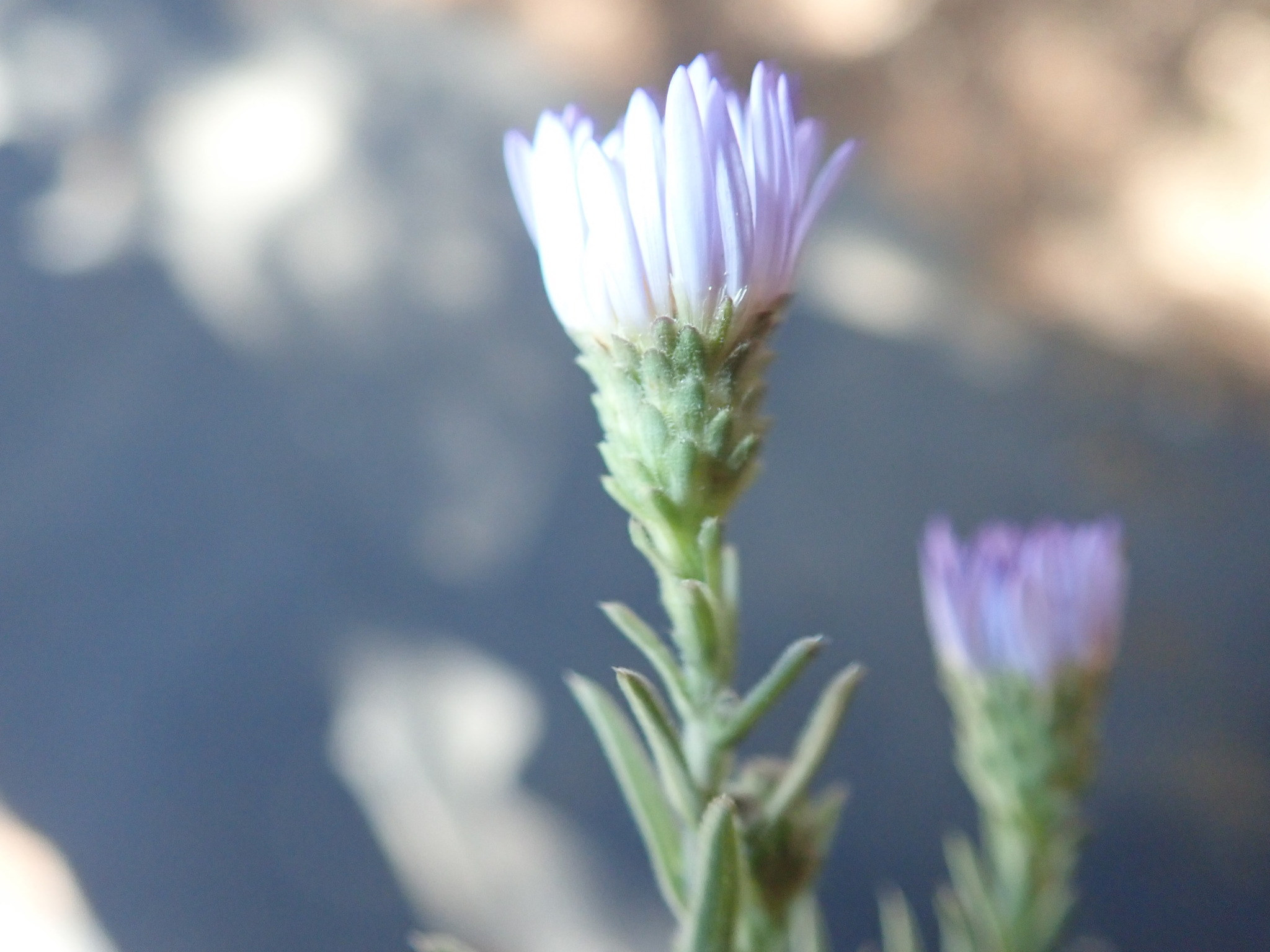

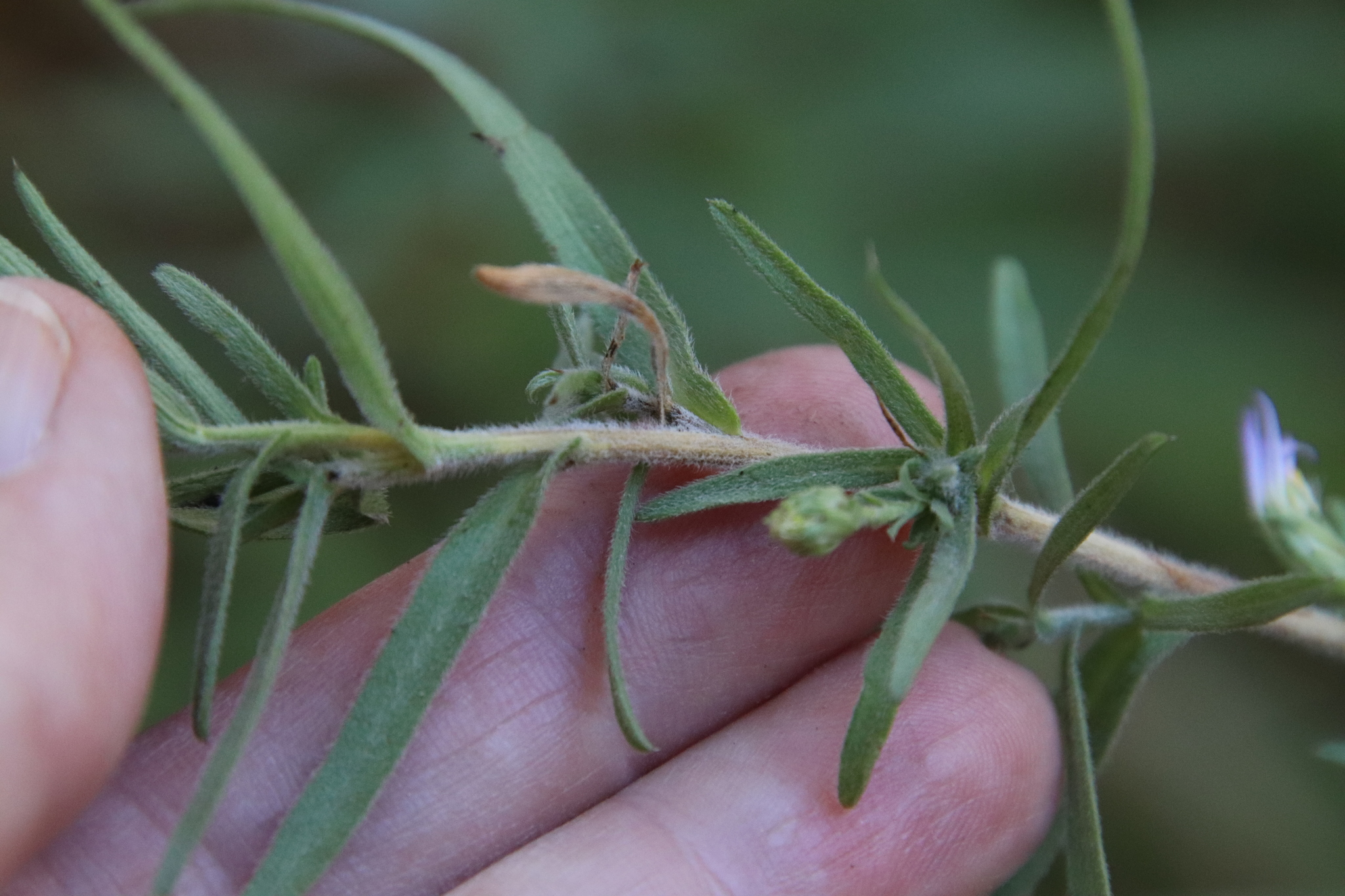

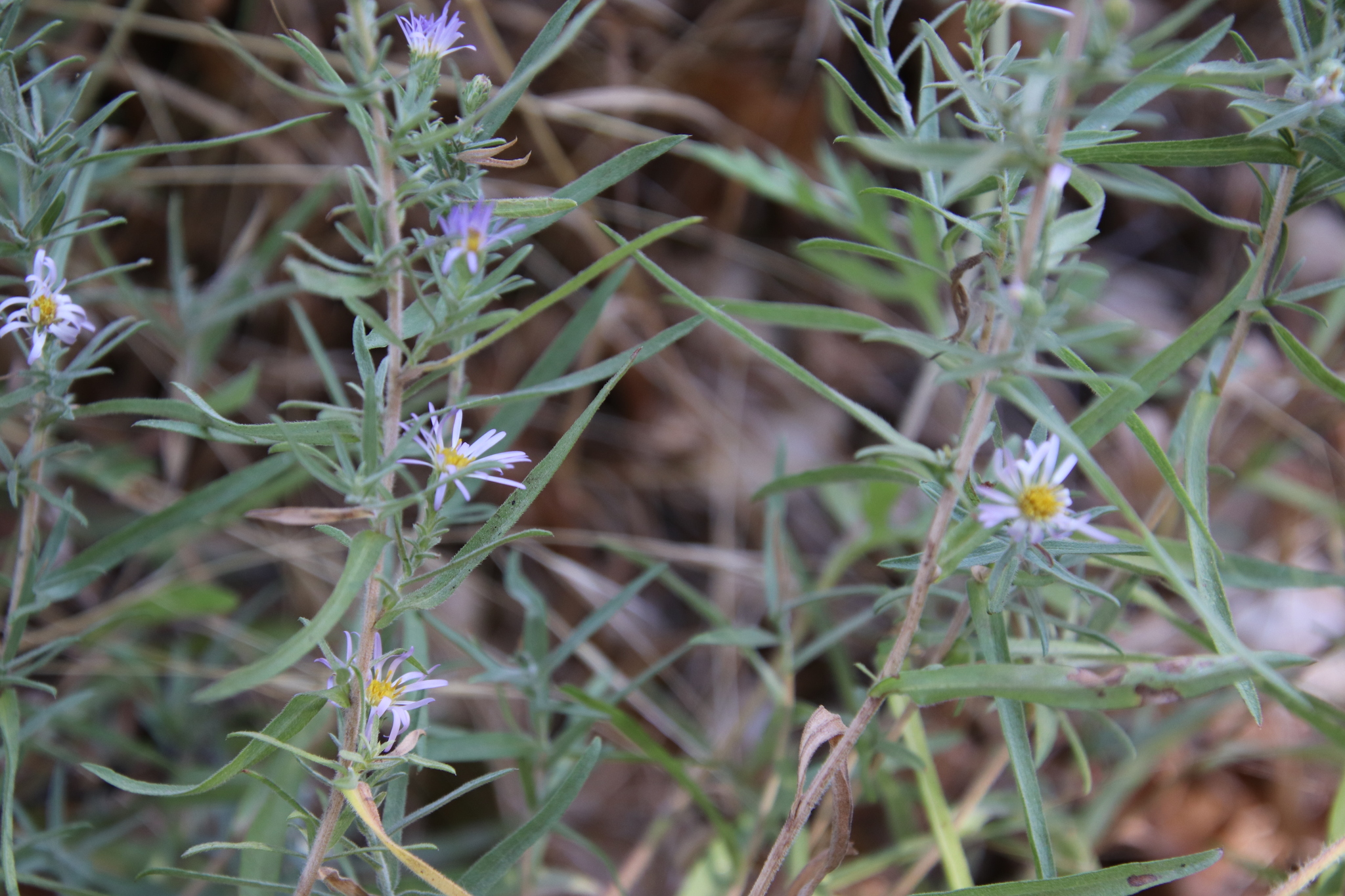

=== Chromosomes ===
Symphyotrichum defoliatum is an allopolyploid species likely derived from the backcrossing of S. falcatum (chromosome base number x = 5) with S. ascendens (base number x = 13), its hybrid derivative. The backcrossing produced this species with a unique base number of x = 18 and diploid individuals with 2n = 36.

== Distribution and habitat ==
San Bernardino aster is endemic to Southern California, where it is known only from the San Bernardino and San Gabriel Mountains of the Transverse Ranges, and from part of the Peninsular Ranges to the south. It grows in grassland and meadow habitats and in disturbed areas.
