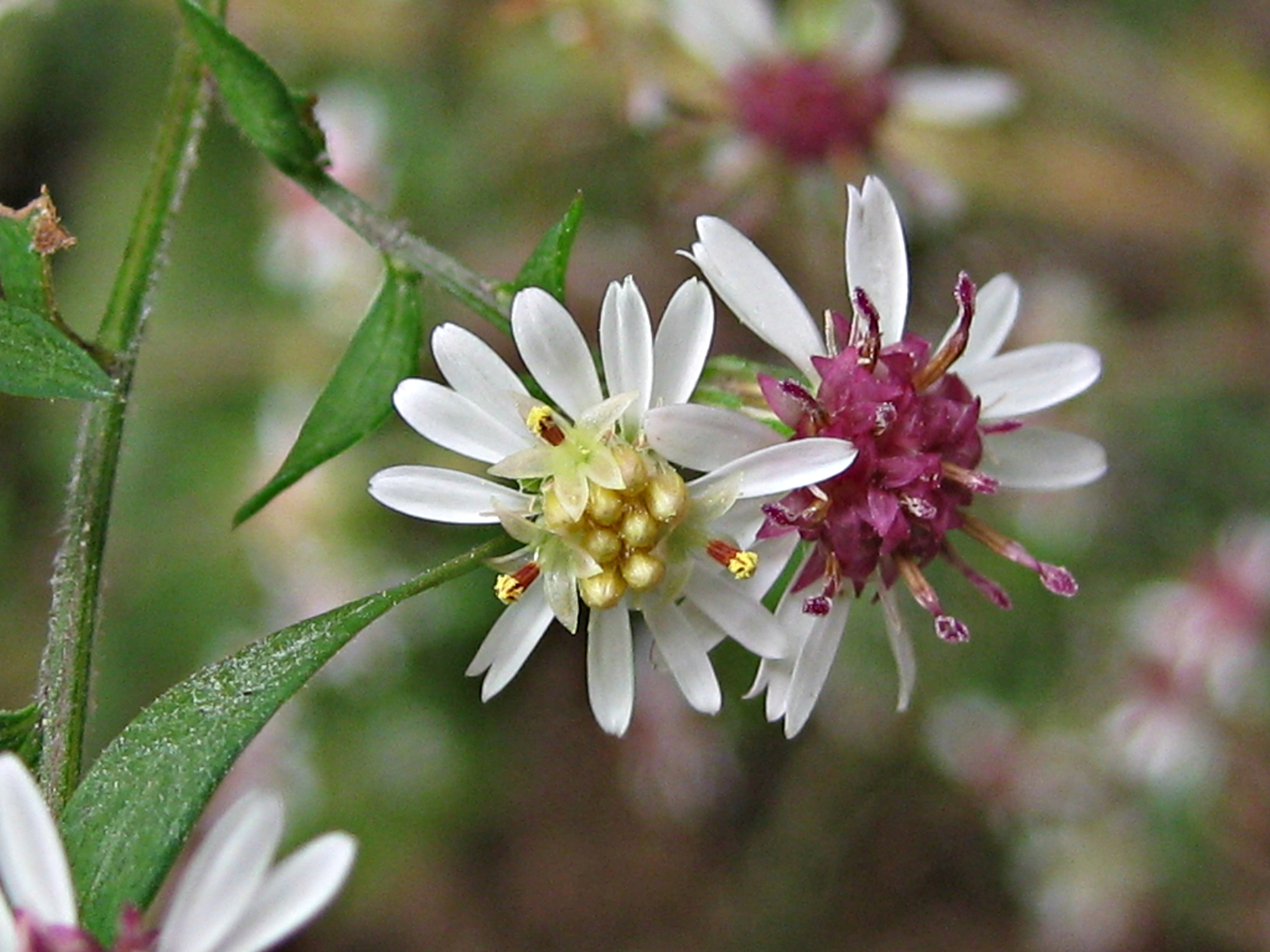

Conservation status
- Secure (NatureServe)

Scientific classification
- Kingdom: Plantae
- Clade: Tracheophytes
- Clade: Angiosperms
- Clade: Eudicots
- Clade: Asterids
- Order: Asterales
- Family: Asteraceae
- Genus: Symphyotrichum
- Subgenus: Symphyotrichum subg. Symphyotrichum
- Section: Symphyotrichum sect. Symphyotrichum
- Species: S. lateriflorum

Binomial name
- Symphyotrichum lateriflorum (L.) Á.Löve & D.Löve
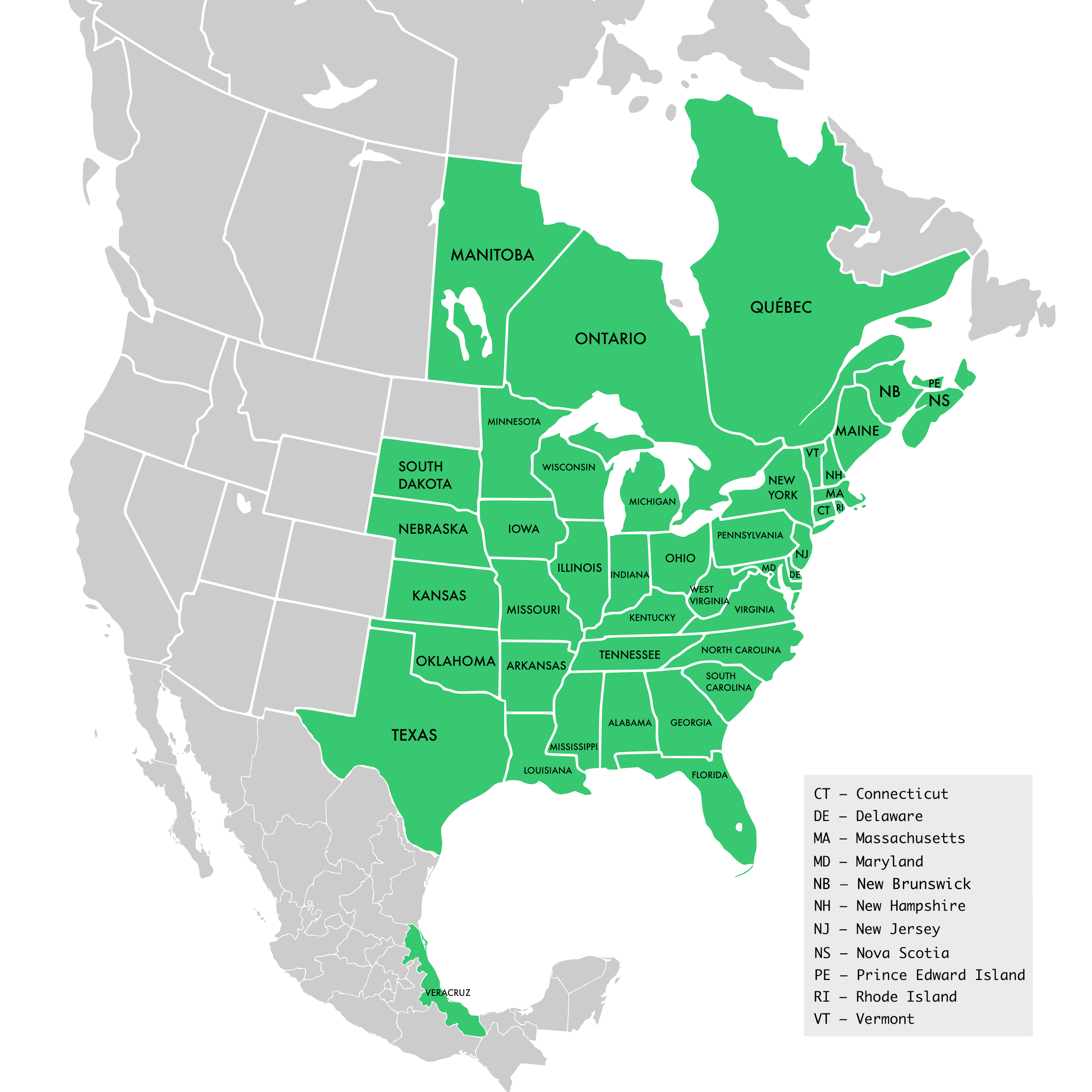
- Native distribution

Synonyms
- Basionym: Solidago lateriflora L.; Most recently: Aster lateriflorus (L.) Britton; Alphabetical list: Aster acadiensis Shinners; Aster agrostifolius E.S.Burgess; Aster bellidiflorus var. rigidulus (Nees) DC.; Aster bifrons Lindl. ex DC.; Aster diffusus Aiton; Aster diffusus var. bifrons (Lindl. ex DC.) A.Gray; Aster diffusus f. bifrons (Lindl. ex DC.) Voss; Aster diffusus var. hirsuticaulis (Lindl. ex DC.) A.Gray; Aster diffusus f. hirsuticaulis (Lindl. ex DC.) Voss; Aster diffusus var. horizontalis (Desf.) A.Gray; Aster diffusus var. variifolius Peck; Aster divaricatus Raf. ex DC.; Aster divergens Aiton; Aster divergens var. diffusus (Aiton) Nutt.; Aster divergens var. humilior DC.; Aster divergens var. pendulus (Aiton) Nutt.; Aster hirsuticaulis Lindl. ex DC.; Aster horizontalis Desf.; Aster lateriflorus var. angustifolius Wiegand; Aster lateriflorus var. bifrons (Lindl. ex DC.) Fernald; Aster lateriflorus var. flagellaris Shinners; Aster lateriflorus var. glomerullus E.S.Burgess; Aster lateriflorus var. grandis Porter; Aster lateriflorus var. hirsuticaulis (Lindl. ex DC.) Porter; Aster lateriflorus var. horizontalis Farw.; Aster lateriflorus var. indutus Shinners; Aster lateriflorus var. pendulus E.S.Burgess; Aster lateriflorus var. spatelliformis (E.S.Burgess) A.G.Jones; Aster lateriflorus var. tenuipes Wiegand; Aster leucanthemus Raf.; Aster miser Nutt.; Aster miser var. abbreviatus DC.; Aster miser var. diffusus (Aiton) L.C.Beck; Aster miser var. divergens (Aiton) L.C.Beck; Aster miser var. glomerellus Torr. & A.Gray; Aster miser var. hirsuticaulis (Lindl. ex DC.) Torr. & A.Gray; Aster miser var. miserrimus Torr. & A.Gray; Aster miser var. myrtifolius (Willd.) DC.; Aster miser var. pendulus (Aiton) L.C.Beck; Aster miser var. vimineus Farw.; Aster myrtifolius Willd.; Aster pendulus Aiton; Aster recurvatus Günther ex Nees; Aster rigidulus Nees; Aster scoparius Nees; Aster seliger Nees; Aster spatelliformis E.S.Burgess; Aster tenuipes (Wiegand) Shinners; Aster tradescanti Michx.; Aster vimineus var. columbianus Britton; Aster vimineus var. dubius Wiegand; Symphyotrichum lateriflorum var. angustifolium (Wiegand) G.L.Nesom; Symphyotrichum lateriflorum var. flagellare (Shinners) G.L.Nesom; Symphyotrichum lateriflorum var. hirsuticaule (Lindl. ex DC.) G.L.Nesom; Symphyotrichum lateriflorum var. horizontale (Desf.) G.L.Nesom; Symphyotrichum lateriflorum var. spatelliforme (E.S.Burgess) G.L.Nesom; Symphyotrichum lateriflorum var. tenuipes (Wiegand) G.L.Nesom; Venatris salicifolius Raf.

= Symphyotrichum lateriflorum =

Species of plant in the aster family

Symphyotrichum lateriflorum (formerly Aster lateriflorus) is a species of flowering plant in the aster family (Asteraceae). Commonly known as calico aster, starved aster, and white woodland aster, it is native to eastern and central North America. It is a perennial and herbaceous plant that may reach heights up to 120 centimeters (4 feet) and widths up to 30 centimeters (1 foot).

The flowers of calico aster are small compared to most Symphyotrichum species. They have an average of 7–15 short white ray florets, which are rarely tinted pink or purple. The flower centers, composed of disk florets, begin as cream to yellow and often become pink, purple, or brown as they mature. There are roughly 8–16 disk florets, each with five lobes that strongly reflex (bend backwards) when open. The mostly hairless leaves have a characteristic hairy midrib on their back faces, and branching is usually horizontal or in what can appear to be a zigzag pattern. Flower heads grow along one side of the branches and sometimes in clusters at the ends.

Symphyotrichum lateriflorum is a conservationally secure species and grows in a variety of habitats. It can be found throughout most of the eastern and east-central United States and Canada. There is also a native population in the state of Veracruz, Mexico. Its late-summer and fall appearing flowers are visited by small pollinators and nectar-seeking insects such as sweat bees, miner bees, and hoverflies. As well as occurring naturally in several varieties, S. lateriflorum has multiple cultivars and has been grown for at least 250 years in Europe. Some modern-day cultivars are 'Bleke Bet', 'Lady in Black', and 'Prince'. It has been used by Indigenous peoples of the Americas as a medicinal plant.

== Description ==
Symphyotrichum lateriflorum is a clump-forming perennial that grows 20–120 centimeters (3/4–4 feet) tall and up to 30 cm (1 ft) wide. Herbaceous and with alternate leaves, it can have a different appearance throughout its lifespan or a season. For example, a mature or returning plant, or one late in the season, may have one or more stiff stems that reach close to maximum height, several arching branches, and multiple clusters of flowers (inflorescences). An early or first-year plant may have one short and somewhat floppy stem, several large leaves, and end abruptly with one flower head in the center.

=== Roots ===
The roots of Symphyotrichum lateriflorum have short and woody branched caudices, and can have short rhizomes that may produce offsets. The images of caudices are from dried specimens of S. lateriflorum that are stored in the New York Botanical Garden (NYBG) Steere Herbarium.

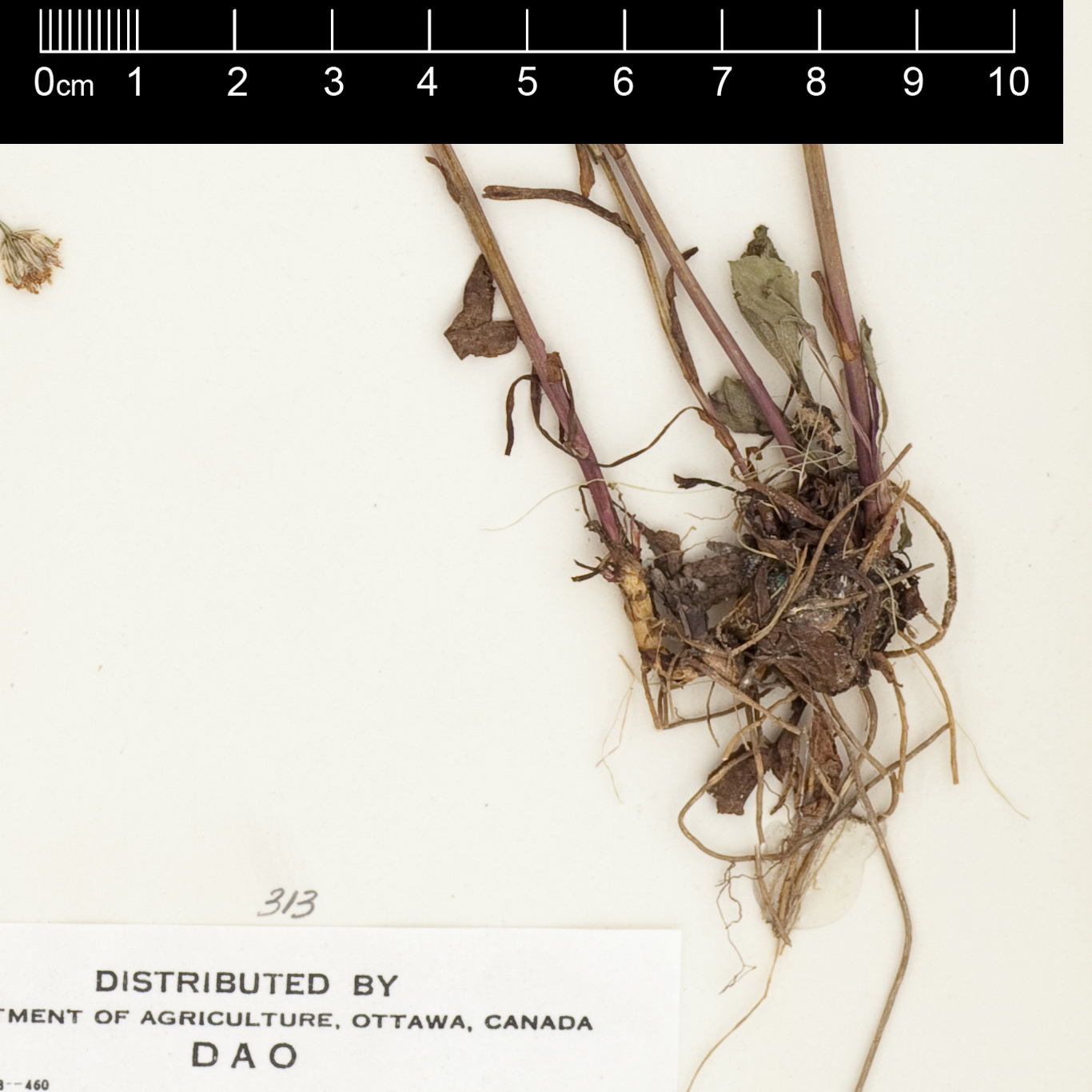
Caudex with no rhizomes

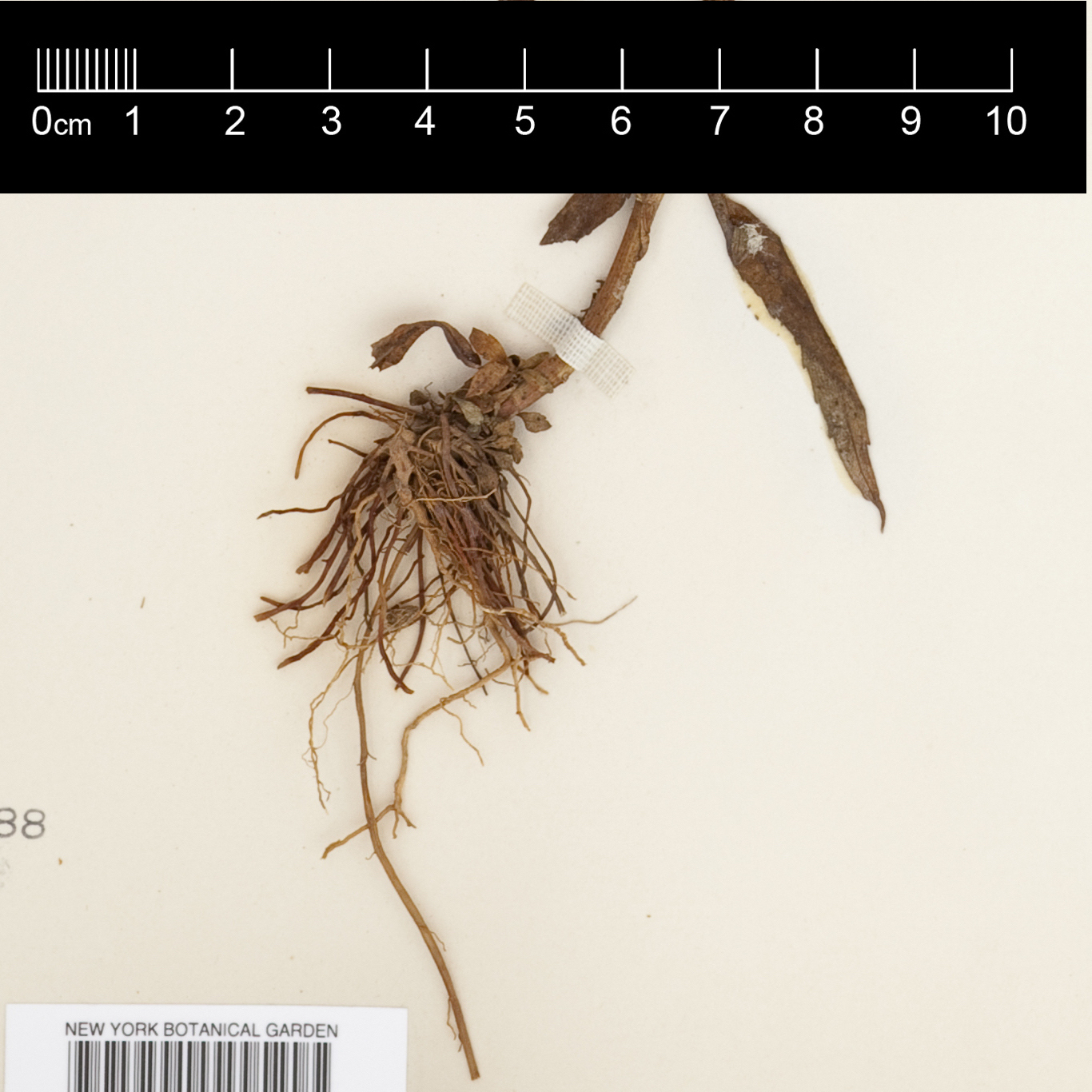
Caudex with no rhizomes

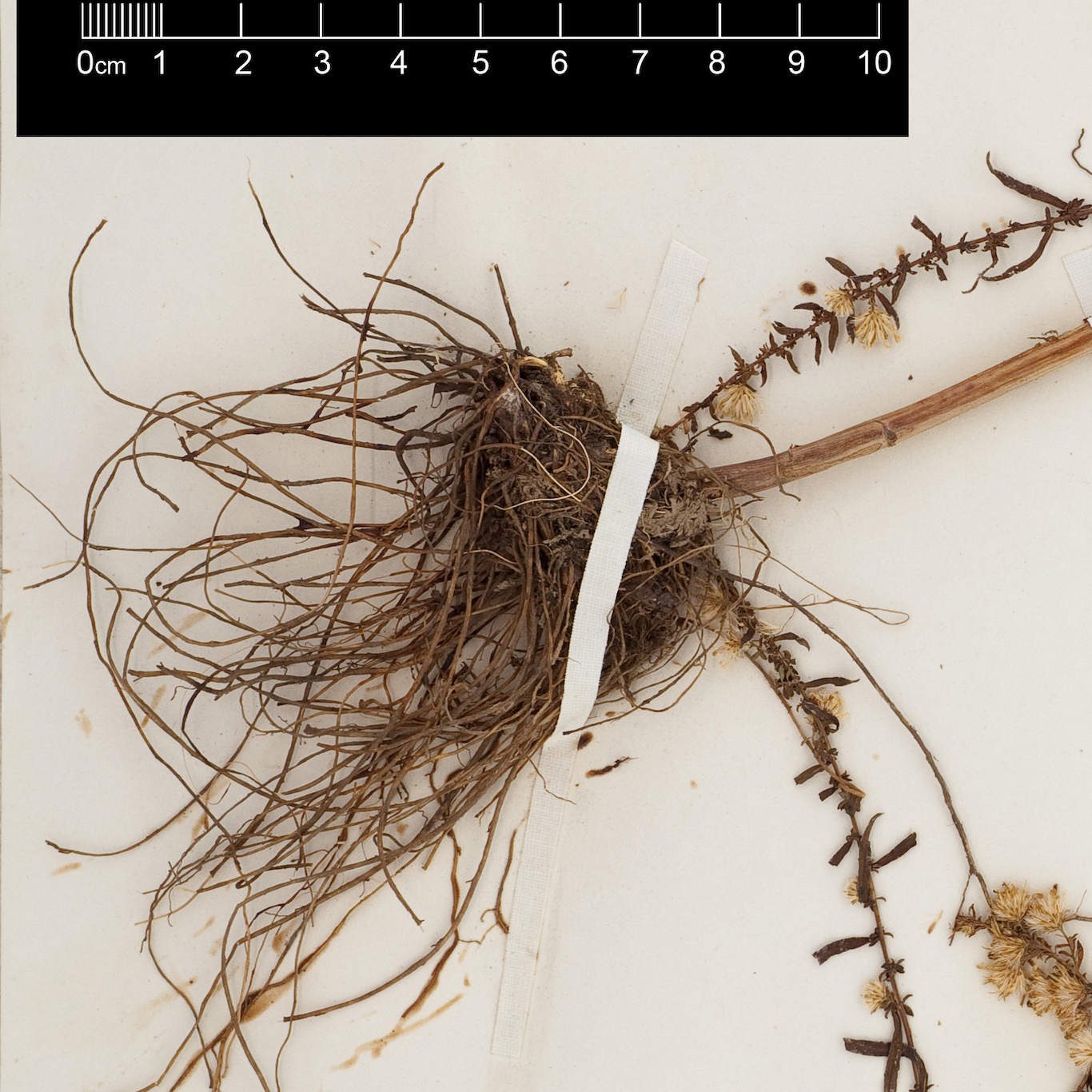
Caudex with no rhizomes

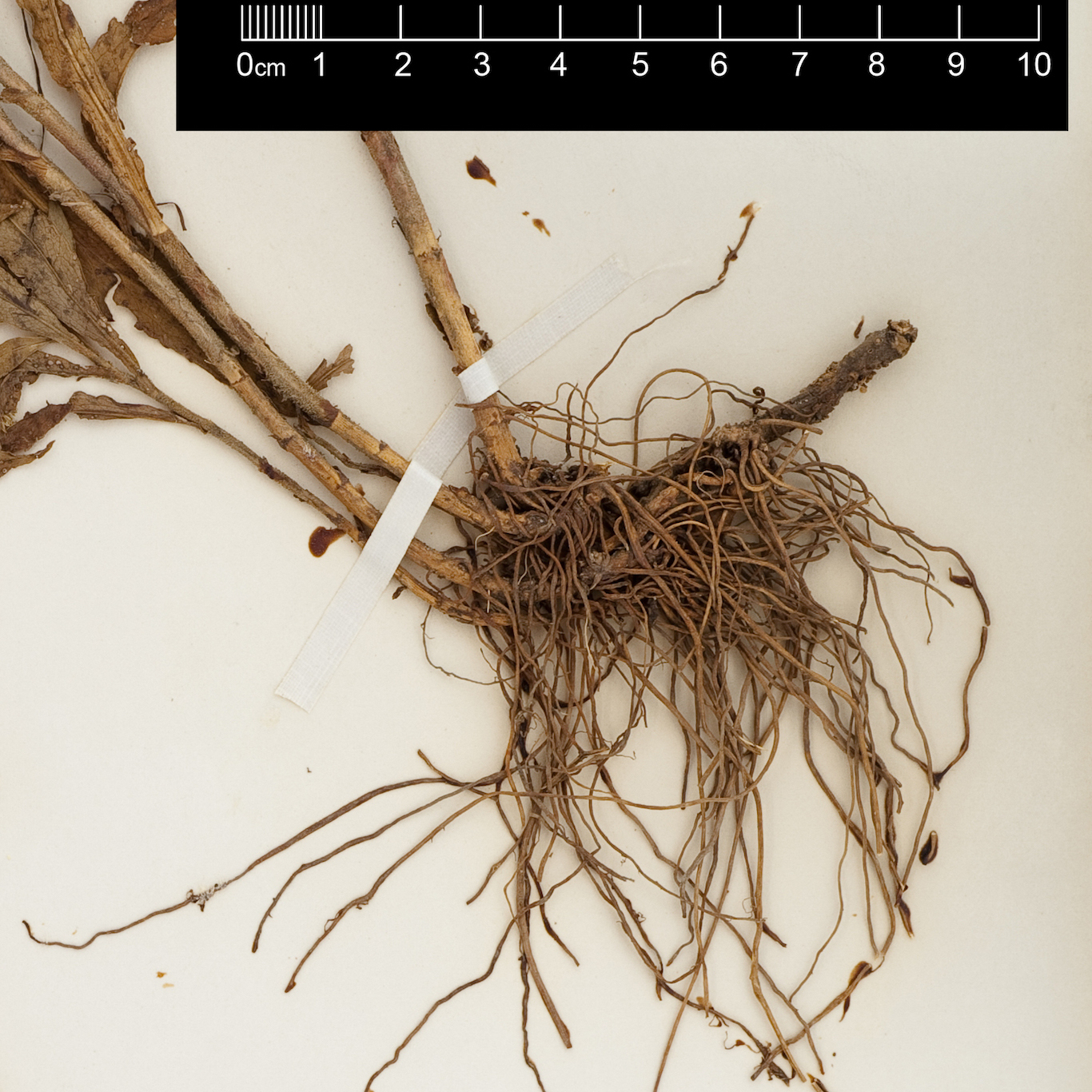
Two or three rhizomes

=== Stems ===
Symphyotrichum lateriflorum has from one to five stems growing from the root base. These stems can be a reddish or purplish color, often with a woody appearance, or a shade of green. Characteristics can depend on the prevalence of sun, with the green stems occurring more likely in the shade.

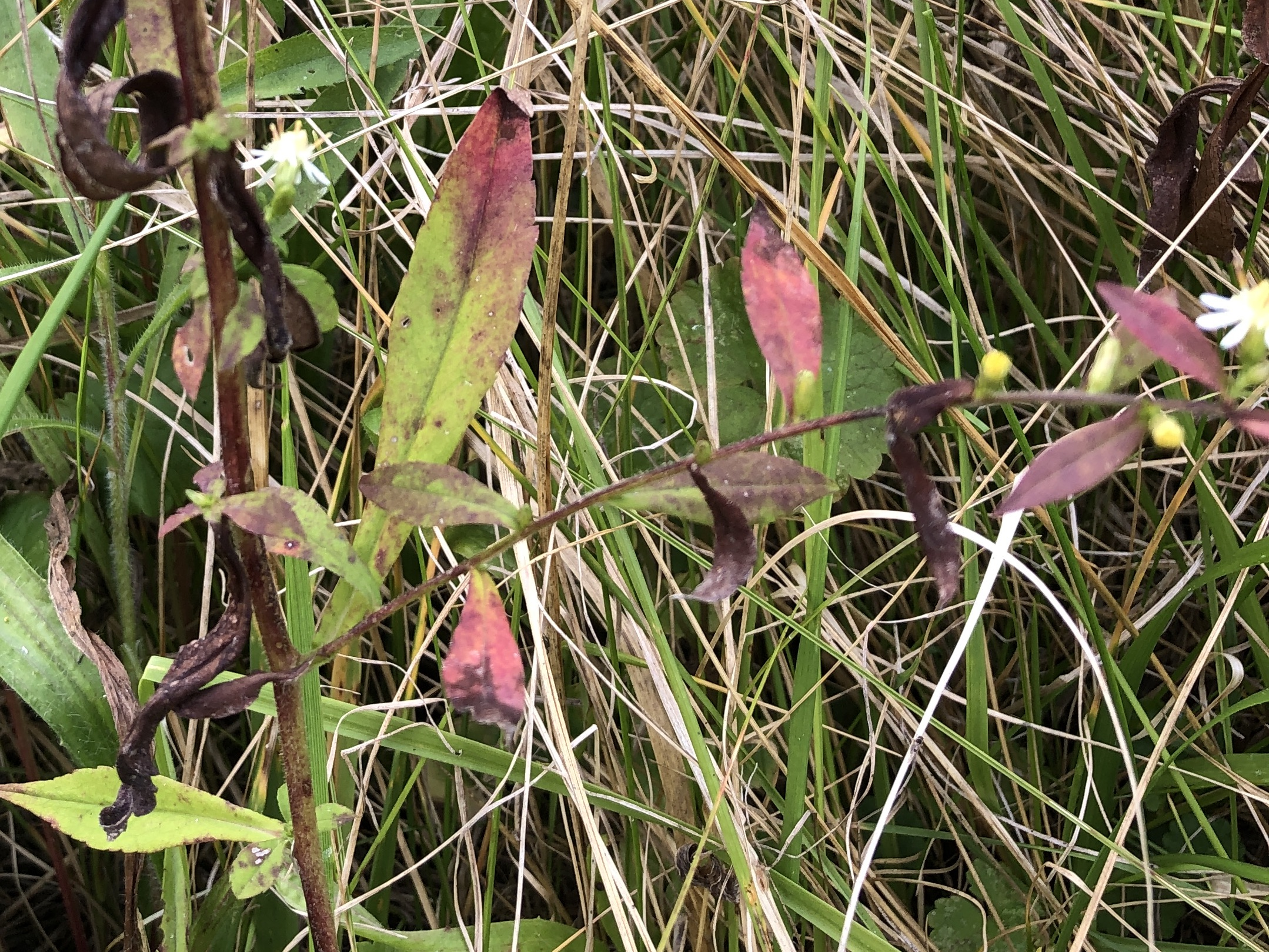
Close-up of S. lateriflorum stem and branch node

Slender and wiry inflorescence-filled branches grow from the stems at almost a right angle or in long arches. Shorter branches may ascend rather than arch. Stems and branches can be covered with fine soft hair, but sometimes the amount of hair is reduced farther from the base, mid-stem, or as it goes up the stem. The hair usually grows in vertical lines, particularly on the inflorescence branches.

=== Leaves ===
Symphyotrichum lateriflorum has alternate and simple leaves. Characteristics vary among leaves on the same plant and on plants in different environments and areas of the range. Leaves occur at the base, on stems, and on inflorescence branches. The farther away from the base the leaves are, the smaller they become, sometimes markedly so. By the time flowers appear, the leaves at the base and stem have often withered or fallen. Leaves have fine, reticulate veins (Note: Repeated branching of the veins on the leaf so that they look like a net) and little to no hair except for the key characteristic of hair on the back, or abaxial, midrib. This abaxial midrib hair sometimes can all but disappear as the plant ages within a season.

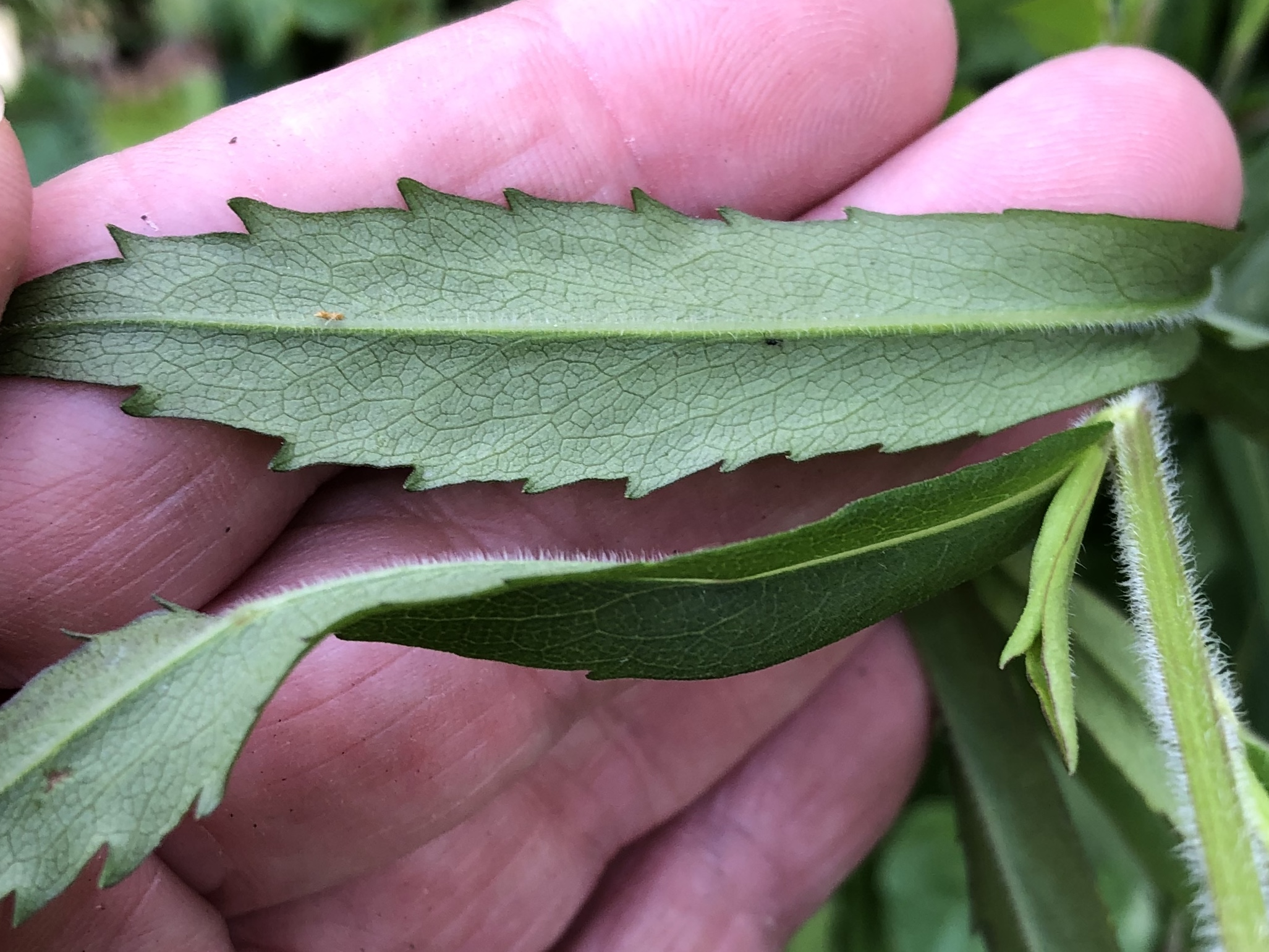
Abaxial leaf on S. lateriflorum plant showing hairy midrib and the net-like reticulate veins on the leaf surface

Basal, or ground level, leaves vary in shape from oblanceolate, lance-ovate, ovate, spatulate, to nearly circular. They are thin and the least lance-shaped, with a short or no leafstalk. Basal leaf sizes vary, measuring about 3–35 millimeters (0.1–1.4 inches) in length by 7–25 mm (0.3–1.0 in) in width. The surfaces feel slightly rough to the touch, and the edges are wavy or saw-toothed. Leaves may or may not come to a point at the end depending upon their shape.

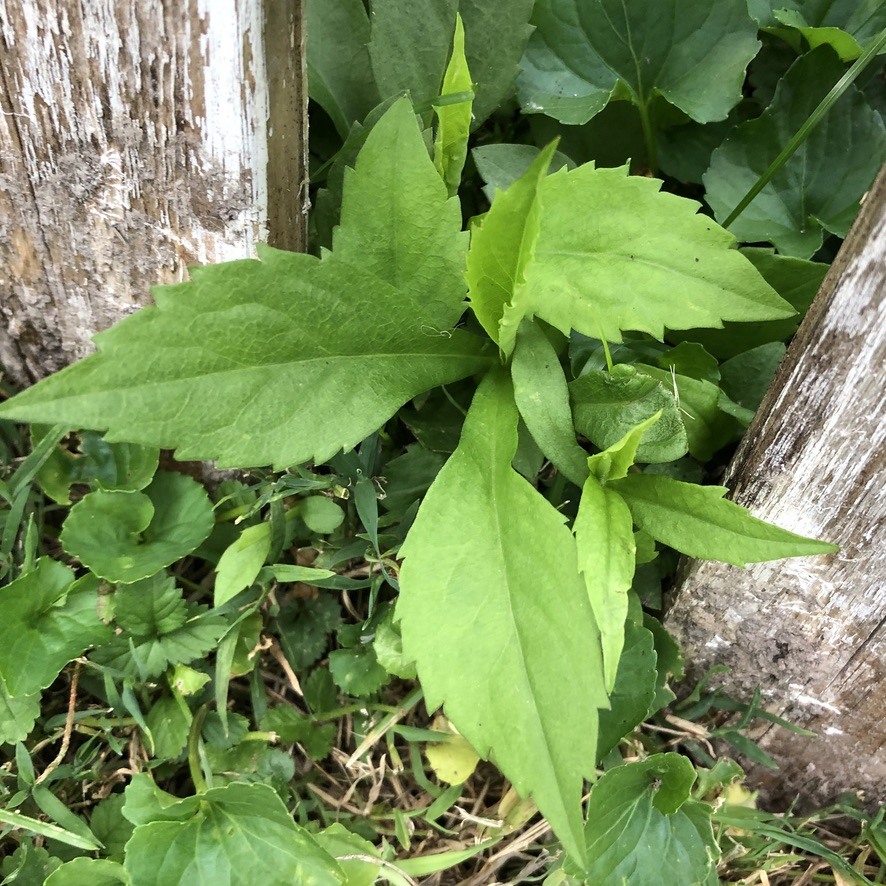
Lance-ovate shaped basal leaves on a juvenile S. lateriflorum plant

Lower and middle stem leaves have no leafstalk, meaning they are sessile, or they have a very short leafstalk with wings. The shapes of the stem leaves vary from ovate or elliptic to elliptic-oblanceolate or lanceolate, rarely linear-lanceolate. Sizes become much smaller the farther they grow from the base. In length, they are 5–10 cm (2–4 in) with widths 1–2 cm (0.4–0.8 in).

Distal leaves, higher on the stem and on the branches with the flower heads, are also sessile. Their margins are sometimes entire, smooth on the edges with no teeth or lobes. Sizes range from 1 cm (0.4 in) to 15 cm (6 in) in length and up to 3 cm (1.2 in) in width. The more distal, the smaller they are, and this change can occur abruptly.

=== Flowers ===
Symphyotrichum lateriflorum is a late-summer and fall blooming perennial, the flower heads opening as early as July in some locations and as late as October in others. The flower heads grow in much-branched arrays called panicles and are racemose. They generally stay on the upper sides of their stalks, which are called peduncles. The flower heads at the ends of the peduncles mature approximately one week before those on the rest of the plant.

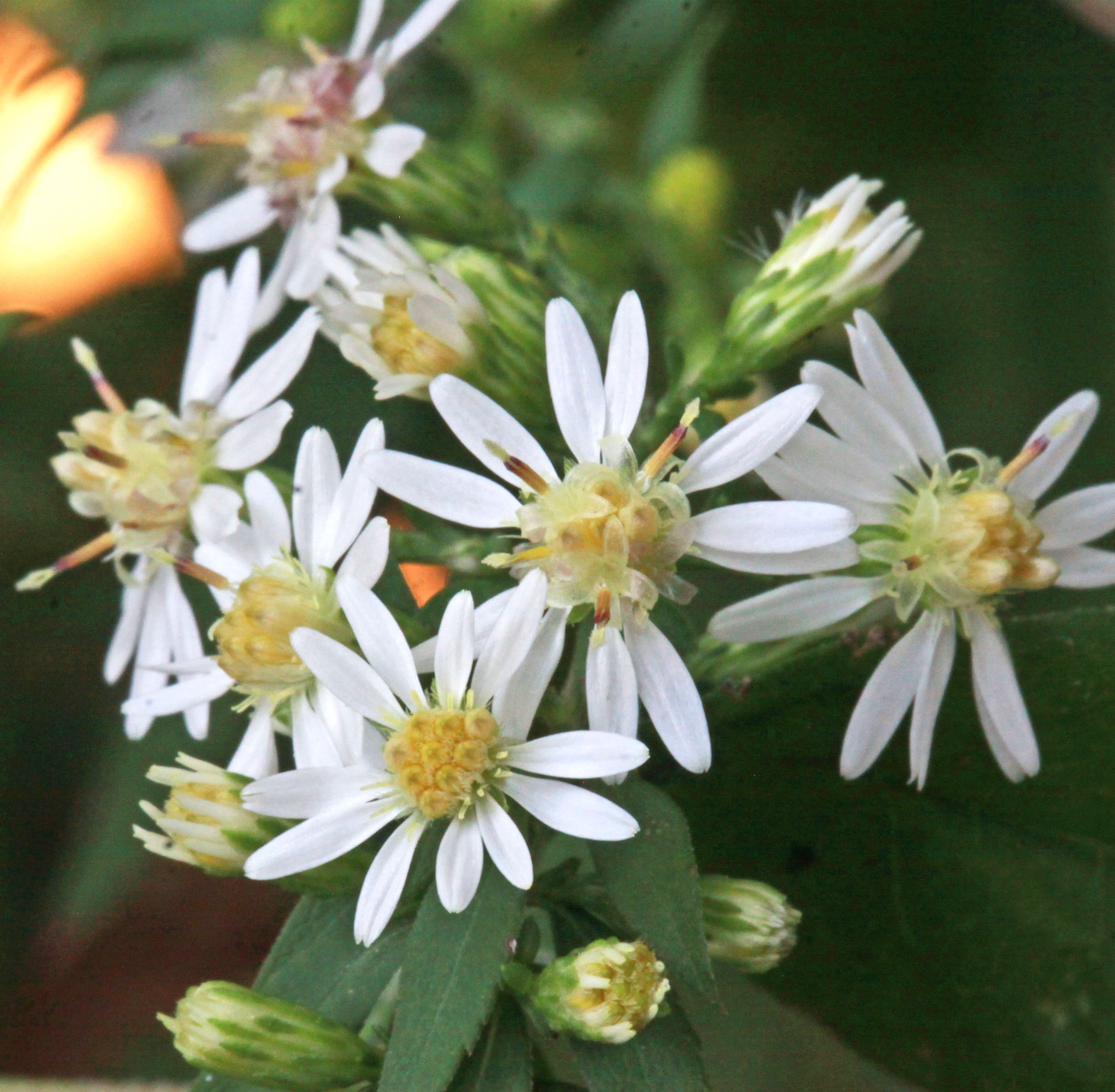
Several flower heads of S. lateriflorum

Each flower head is about 13 mm (0.5 in) diameter when in bloom, and is either sessile or with a usually hairy (specifically, pilose) peduncle which is less than 10 mm (0.4 in) in length. At the base of a flower head are from one to seven bracts which look like (and technically are) small leaves that grade into the phyllaries.

==== Involucres and phyllaries ====
On the outsides of the flower heads of all members of the family Asteraceae are small bracts that look like scales. These are called phyllaries, and together they form the involucre that protects the individual flowers in the head before they open. (Note: See Asteraceae § Flowers for more detail.) The involucres of Symphyotrichum lateriflorum are cylinder-bell in shape and usually 4–6 mm (0.16–0.24 in) in length.

The phyllaries are appressed or slightly spreading. The shape of the outer phyllaries is oblong-lanceolate or oblong-oblanceolate, and the inner phyllaries are linear. They are in 3–4 (sometimes up to 6) unequal rows, meaning they are staggered and do not end at the same point, and they may be smooth or have hairs. The sparsely haired margins of each phyllary may appear white or light green but are translucent or sometimes reddish. The phyllaries have green chlorophyllous zones that are lanceolate, lens-shaped, or diamond-shaped and have green or purplish tips.

==== Florets ====
Each flower head is made up of ray florets and disk florets in about a one to one (1:1) ratio, the former developing 3–4 days before the latter. The 7–15 (Note: Outside range about 6–25) ray florets grow in one series and are usually white, rarely pinkish or purplish. They average 4–5 mm (0.16–0.20 in) in length, but can be as short as 3 mm (0.12 in) and as long as 8 mm (0.31 in). They are 0.9–1.2 mm (0.04–0.05 in) wide.

The disks have 8–16 (Note: Outside range about 6–20) florets that start out as cream or light yellow and after opening, may turn pink, then purple or light brown after pollination. (Note: All species in the Symphyotrichum genus have disk florets that mature to a pink, purple, or light brown. This is not unique to calico aster.) Each disk floret is cylindrical or funnel-shaped, 3–5 mm (0.12–0.20 in) in depth, and is made up of 5 petals, collectively a corolla, which open into 5 lanceolate lobes (Note: There are 5 lobes on the disk florets of all species in Symphyotrichum genus.) comprising 50–75% of the depth of the floret. The lobes become strongly reflexed (bent sharply backwards) once open.

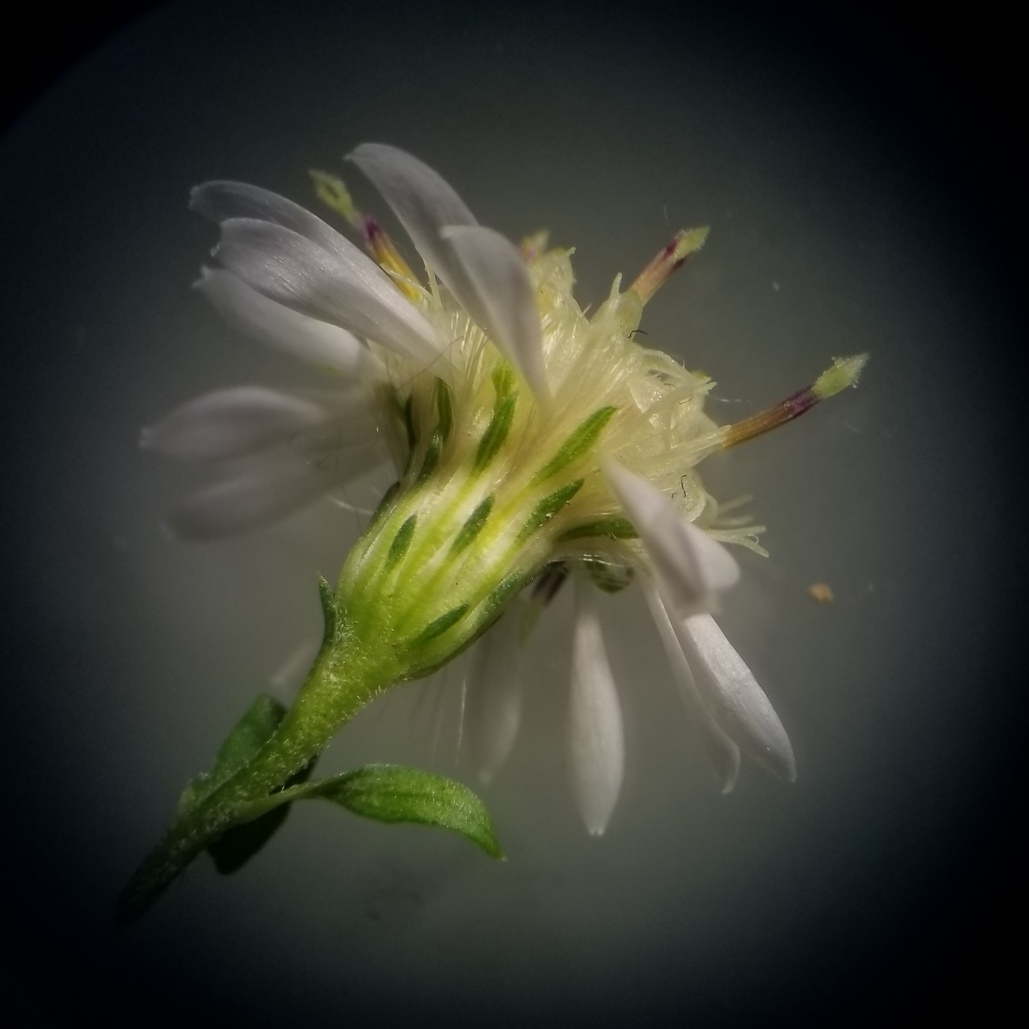
Close-up of involucre, phyllaries, and bracts on S. lateriflorum flower head

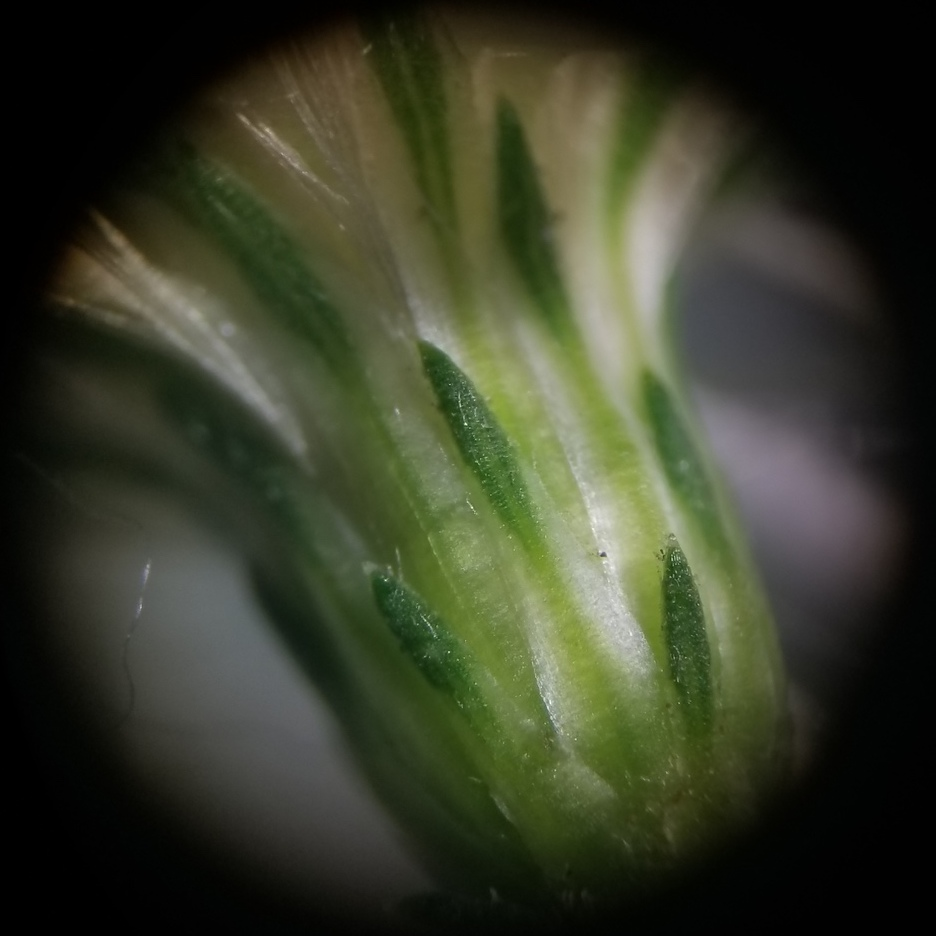
Microscopic photo of the involucre of a flower head of S. lateriflorum plant showing phyllary detail

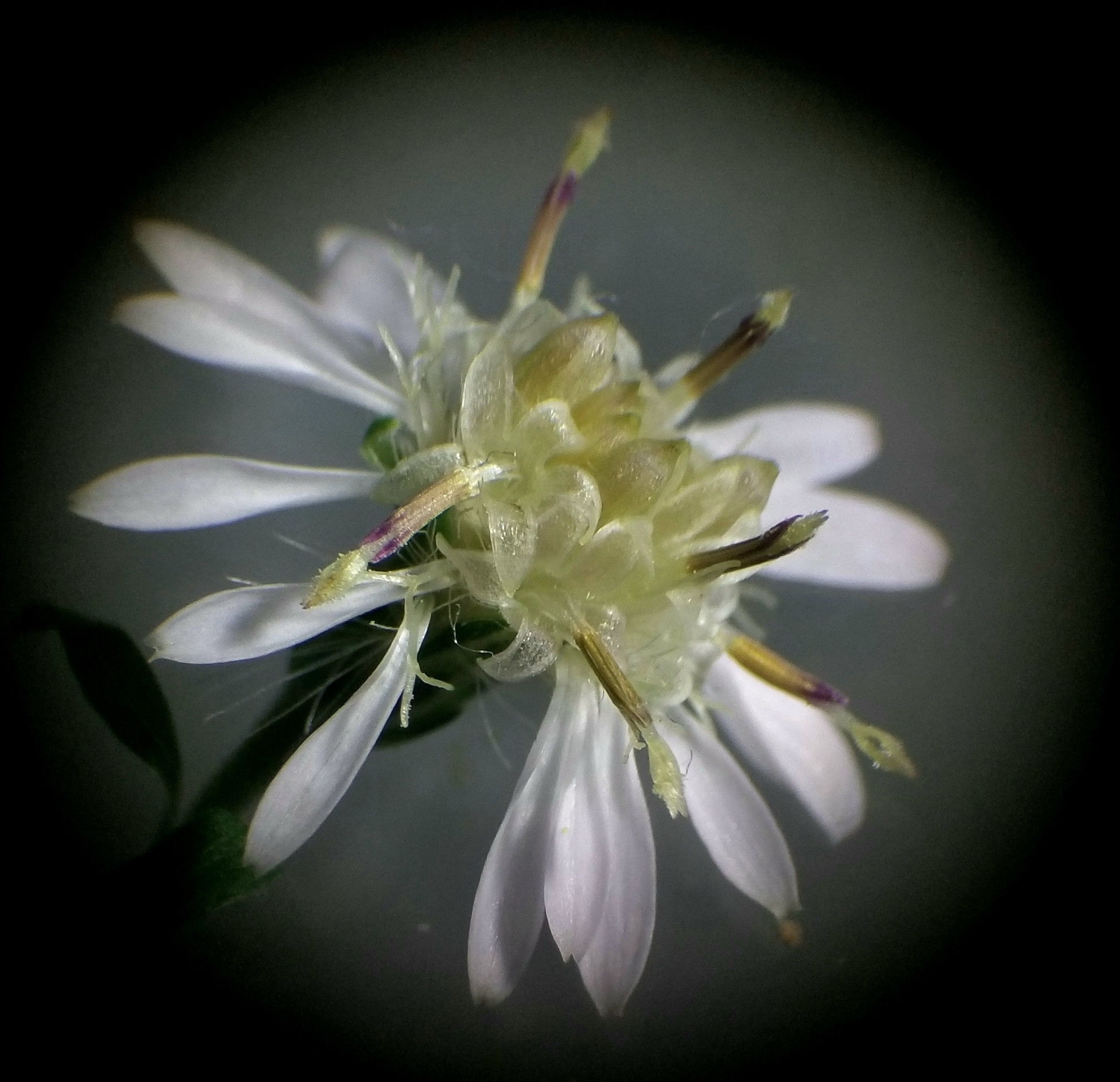
Microscopic photo of S. lateriflorum flower head showing closed and open disk florets

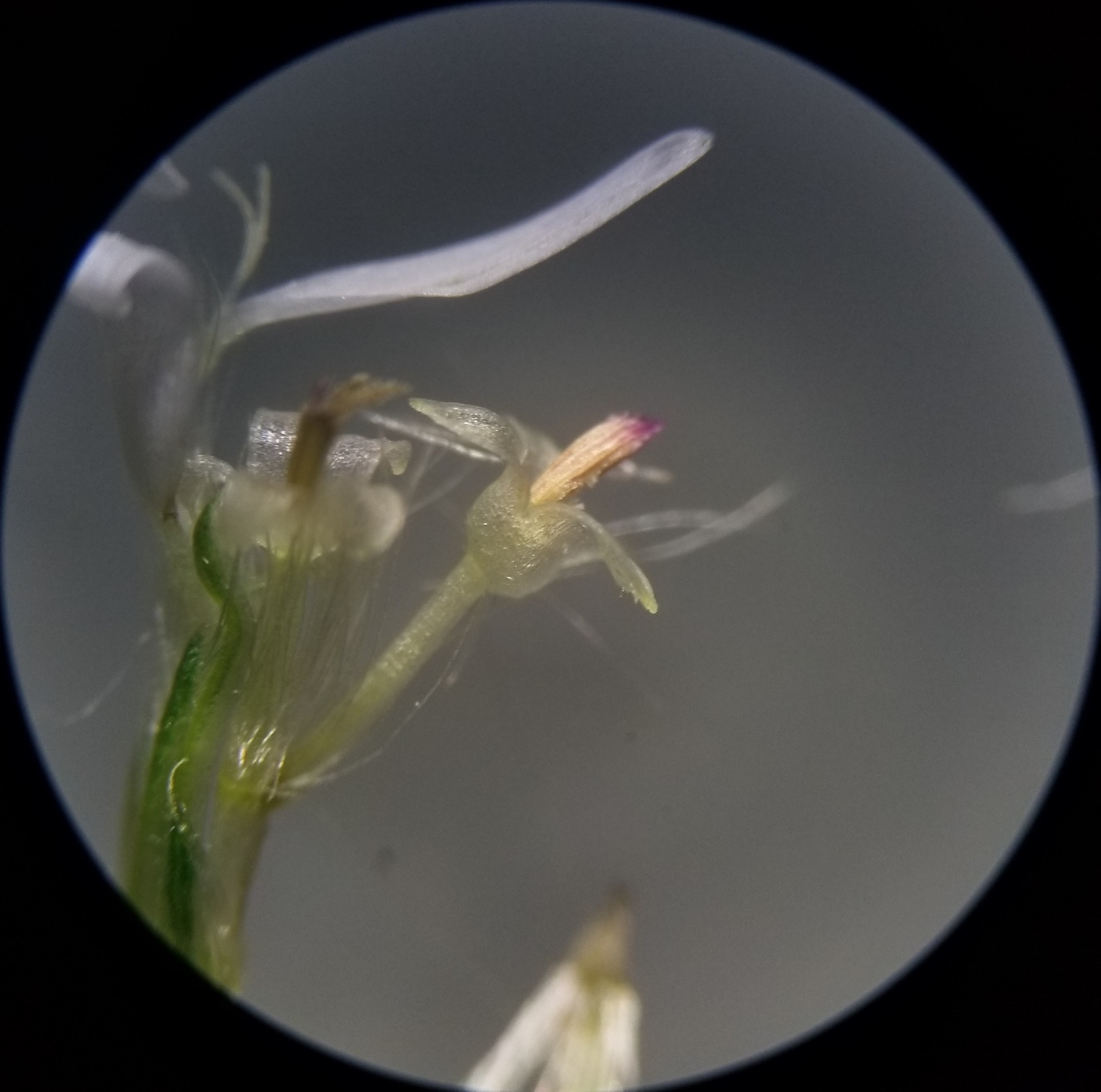
S. lateriflorum microscopic photo of a single ray floret and two disk florets

=== Fruit ===
Diagram of cypsela, with pappi labeled

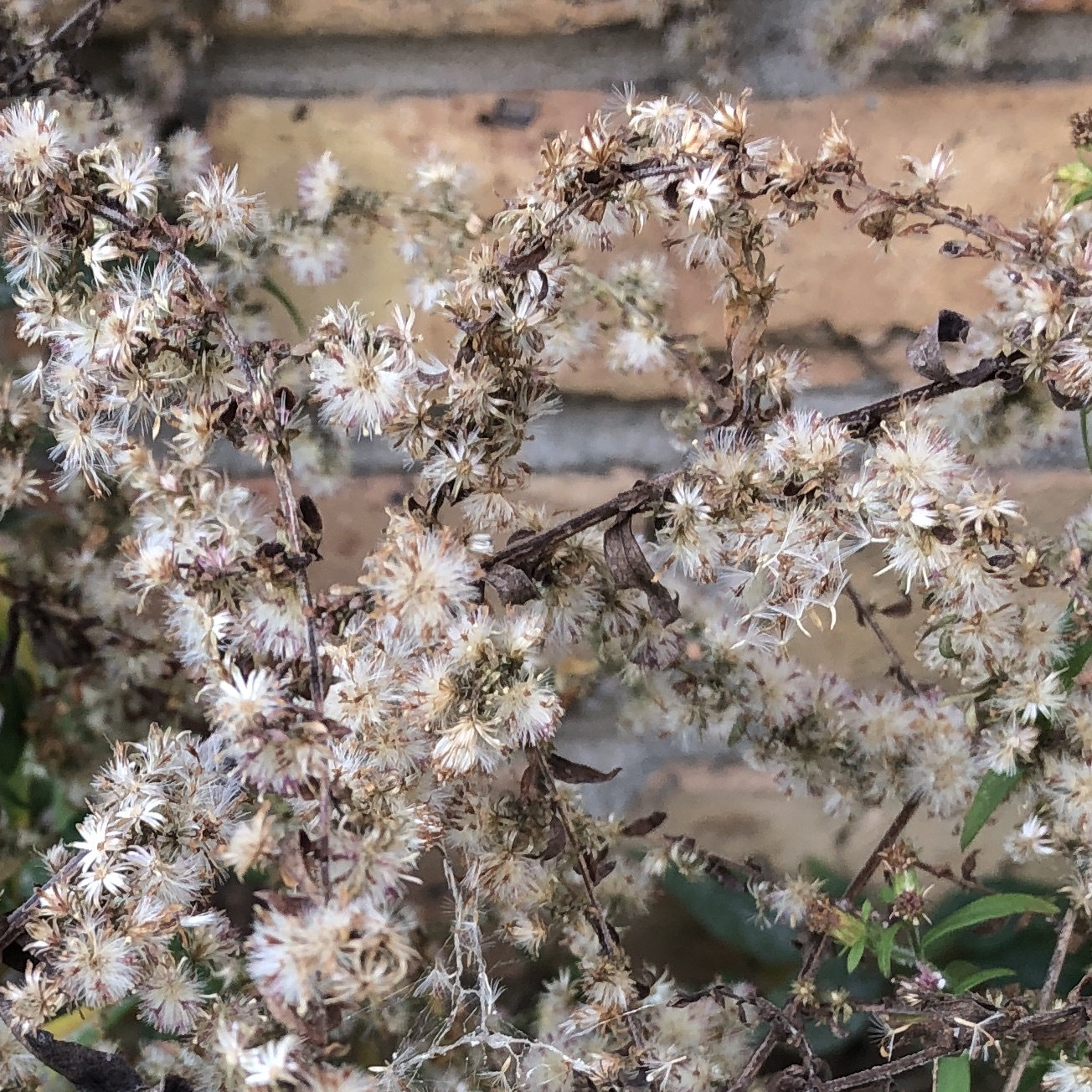
Fruiting plant with many cypselae

The fruits (seeds) of Symphyotrichum lateriflorum are not true achenes but are cypselae, resembling an achene and surrounded by a calyx sheath. This is true for all members of the Asteraceae family. After pollination, they mature in 3–4 weeks and become gray or tan with an oblong-obovoid shape, 1.3–2.2 mm (0.051–0.087 in) in length with 3–5 nerves, and with a few stiff, slender bristles on their surfaces (strigillose). They also have tufts of hair (pappi) on the top which are white to pinkish and 3–4 mm (0.12–0.16 in) in length.

=== Chromosomes ===
Symphyotrichum lateriflorum has a base number of eight chromosomes (x = 8). Diploid, tetraploid, hexaploid, and octaploid plants with respective chromosome counts of 16, 32, 48, and 64 have been reported.

== Taxonomy ==
=== Classification ===
Symphyotrichum lateriflorum is a member of the genus Symphyotrichum, and is classified in the subgenus Symphyotrichum, section Symphyotrichum, subsection Dumosi. It is one of the "bushy asters and relatives". Its basionym (original scientific name) is Solidago lateriflora L., and it has sixty taxonomic synonyms. Its name with author citations is Symphyotrichum lateriflorum (L.) Á.Löve & D.Löve. Swedish botanist Carl Linnaeus, in 1753, was the first to describe what we know today as Symphyotrichum lateriflorum.

==== Subgenus cladogram ====
Placement within Symphyotrichum subg. Symphyotrichum
- - Symphyotrichum subg. Symphyotrichum
    - sect. Conyzopsis
      - S. ciliatum
      - S. frondosum
      - S. laurentianum
    - sect. Occidentales
      - S. chilense
      - S. eatonii
      - S. foliaceum
      - S. greatae
      - S. hallii
      - S. hendersonii
      - S. jessicae
      - S. lentum
      - S. molle
      - S. spathulatum
      - S. subspicatum
    - sect. Turbinelli
      S. turbinellum
    - sect. Symphyotrichum
      - ssect. Dumosi
        - S. boreale
        - S. bullatum
        - S. burgessii
        - S. carnerosanum
        - S. dumosum
        - S. eulae
        - S. lanceolatum
        - S. lateriflorum
        - S. leone
        - S. nahanniense
        - S. ontarionis
        - S. praealtum
        - S. racemosum
        - S. schaffneri
        - S. simmondsii
        - S. tradescantii
        - S. welshii
      - ssect. Heterophylli
        - ser. Concinni
          - S. laeve
          - S. oolentangiense
        - ser. Cordifolii
          - S. anomalum
          - S. ciliolatum
          - S. cordifolium
          - S. drummondii
          - S. shortii
          - S. undulatum
          - S. urophyllum
      - ssect. Porteriani
        - S. depauperatum
        - S. kentuckiense
        - S. parviceps
        - S. pilosum
        - S. porteri
      - ssect. Symphyotrichum
        - ser. Punicei
          - S. elliottii
          - S. firmum
          - S. prenanthoides
          - S. puniceum
          - S. rhiannon
        - ser. Symphyotrichum
          - S. anticostense
          - S. novi-belgii
          - S. retroflexum
          - S. robynsianum
  Cladogram references

=== History ===
In 1748, Linnaeus' apostle Pehr Kalm traveled to North America from Europe. He stayed for two and a half years studying flora and fauna and gathering specimens for study by Linnaeus, returning home in 1751. Kalm's travels in North America took him to Pennsylvania, New Jersey, New York, and southeastern Canada. One of the samples he gathered was described by Linnaeus as Solidago lateriflora, now the basionym of Symphyotrichum lateriflorum. Linnaeus recorded the specimen's origin as "Habitat in America Septentrionali" (Latin for "It grows in North America"), and that it was provided by Kalm. Linnaeus classified this plant in the genus Solidago which now contains over 130 of the many species known today as goldenrods. At that time, Linnaeus sorted fifteen of his available specimens into this genus and included them in his two-volume Species Plantarum (1753).

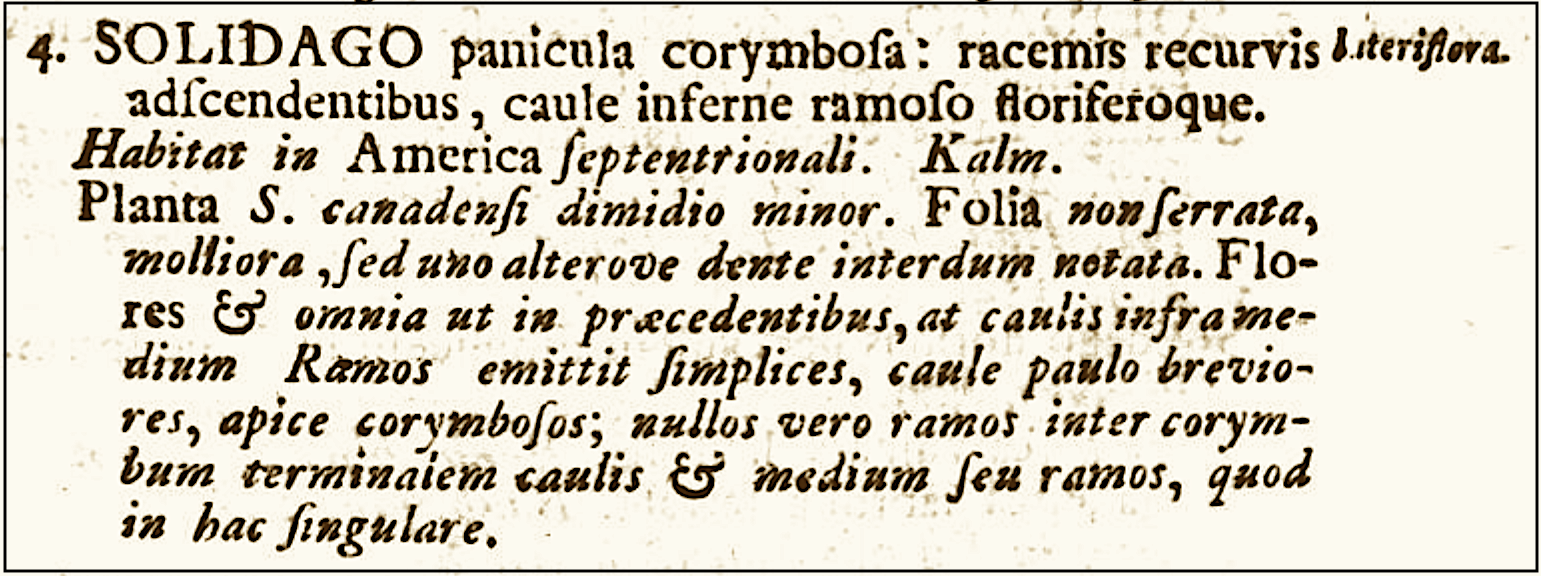
Solidago lateriflora L. protologue. Carl Linnaeus (1753), Species Plantarum, 2: 879. Latin.

In 1789, Scottish botanist William Aiton included Solidago lateriflora in his Hortus Kewensis, the first edition of a catalogue of the plants cultivated at Royal Botanic Gardens, Kew, where he had been the director since 1759. In separate entries, he also described an Aster diffusus, Aster divergens, and Aster miser, all as separate species definitions from Solidago lateriflora. In the A. miser section, Aiton referenced the A. miser of Linnaeus "excluso synonymo Dillennii". (Note: Aiton was excluding a species named Aster ericoides Meliloti agrariae umbone and drawn by German botanist Johann Jacob Dillenius in his 1732 Hortus Elthamensis. Linnaeus referenced it as the species he named Aster miser. See and for details.) The Plants of the World Online (POWO) entry for Symphyotrichum lateriflorum includes Aster diffusus Aiton as a synonym, but not Aster miser L. or Aster miser Aiton. It does include Aster miser Nutt. which was described by English naturalist Thomas Nuttall in 1818. Nuttall stated that what he described appeared "to be the A. miser of Linnaeus, but probably not that of Aiton". Aster divergens Aiton is also listed as a taxonomic synonym.

It was not until 1889 that American botanist Nathaniel Lord Britton combined Solidago lateriflora L. with Aster species, identifying Aster diffusus Aiton and Aster miser Aiton as the same. This resulted in one species named Aster lateriflorus (L.) Britton, with Solidago lateriflora L. as the basionym, as it had been the first described. Other names and combinations occurred before and after this, but Aster lateriflorus was the only one associated with the original Solidago lateriflora until the broad and polyphyletic circumscription of the genus Aster was divided. Aster lateriflorus (L.) Britton was moved to the genus Symphyotrichum in 1982 by Áskell and Doris Löve during their study of plant chromosomes making its binomial name Symphyotrichum lateriflorum (L.) Á.Löve & D.Löve where it currently remains. The infraspecies were subsequently moved by American botanist Guy L. Nesom in 1994.

In a 1928 study of Aster lateriflorus and close relatives, while pondering the "endless confusion in the naming of specimens" of this species, American botanist Karl McKay Wiegand noted how environmental differences likely affected leaf and flower head characteristics, causing botanists to name specimens of this plant as different varieties or species when they may not have been. In this study, Wiegand compared characteristics among the specimens which largely had been ignored up to that point, namely, "the exact length of the involucre and the inner involucral bracts, the number of rays, and the shape of the limb in the disk-corolla as well as the length and character of its lobes."

=== Varieties ===
The Catalogue of Life (COL) recognized six varieties of Symphyotrichum lateriflorum (L.) Á.Löve & D.Löve on its 2009 Annual Checklist. By 2017, all had been reduced to taxonomic synonyms. S. lateriflorum var. hirsuticaule was reduced five years prior, in 2012. According to Flora of North America, "[m]uch genetic and phenotypic variation is encountered within the complex; a thorough study is needed before a coherent taxonomy can be achieved."

Although the following varieties are neither accepted by COL nor POWO, they were accepted as of 2021 by one or more of USDA PLANTS Database, NatureServe, World Flora Online (WFO), Integrated Taxonomic Information System (ITIS), and Database of Vascular Plants of Canada (VASCAN). The autonym is Symphyotrichum lateriflorum var. lateriflorum.

==== Variety angustifolium ====
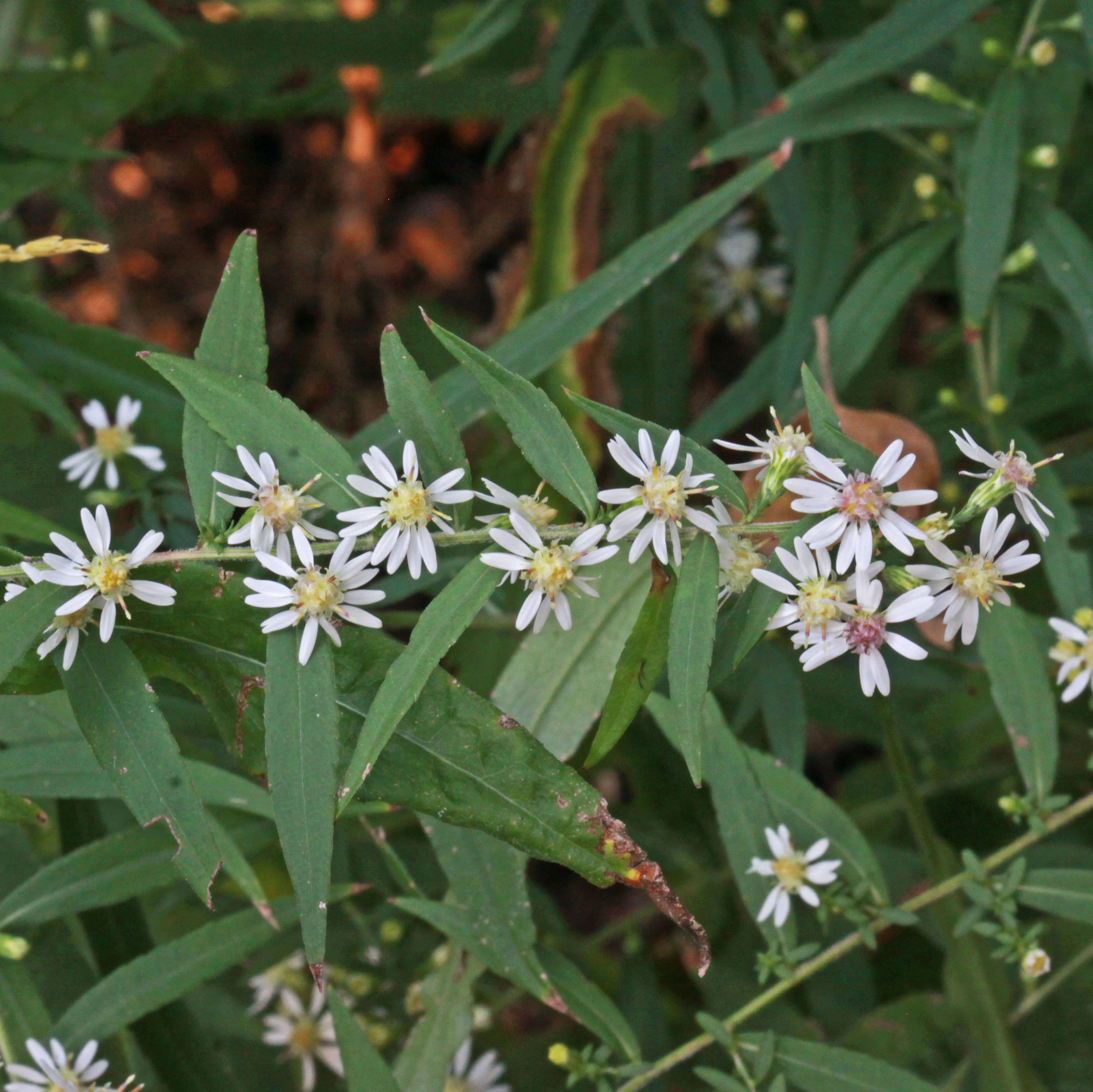
Lanceolate and linear leaves on an inflorescence of S. lateriflorum

Symphyotrichum lateriflorum var. angustifolium (Wiegand) G.L.Nesom is commonly known as narrow-leaved calico aster. In 1903, American botanist Edward Sandford Burgess described a new species he named Aster agrostifolius which, along with other characteristics, had very thin grass-like leaves. Karl McKay Wiegand, in 1928, then described a new variety of A. lateriflorus which he named A. lateriflorus var. angustifolius. He based the name on the appearance of the leaves: "foliis anguste lanceolatis vel linearibus", in English, "with narrowly lanceolate or linear leaves". He did not associate his variety with the A. agrostifolius of Burgess. Wiegand identified the holotype for his variety as collected from Cheshire, Massachusetts, 1915, by J. R. Churchill (Note: Joseph Richmond Churchill of Dorchester, Massachusetts) and held in the herbarium of the New England Botanical Club. (Note: Information about and image of this holotype is viewable online at the Harvard University Herbaria & Libraries Digital Collections (huh.harvard.edu) — Specimens, Barcode 00263144.) He noted that "var. angustifolius may be nothing more than a separation of the narrow leaved individuals of the typical form." After Nesom reclassified the varieties from genus Aster to Symphyotrichum, S. lateriflorum var. angustifolium was created, and the two former taxa became its taxonomic synonyms.

==== Variety flagellare ====
In 1953, Canadian-American botanist Lloyd Herbert Shinners named specimens as two new varieties of Aster lateriflorus: A. lateriflorus var. flagellaris Shinners and A. lateriflorus var. indutus Shinners. In his protologues, Shinners said specifically that both had deeply lobed disk corollas and no rhizomes, and these characteristics were his reasoning for placing them both with A. lateriflorus.

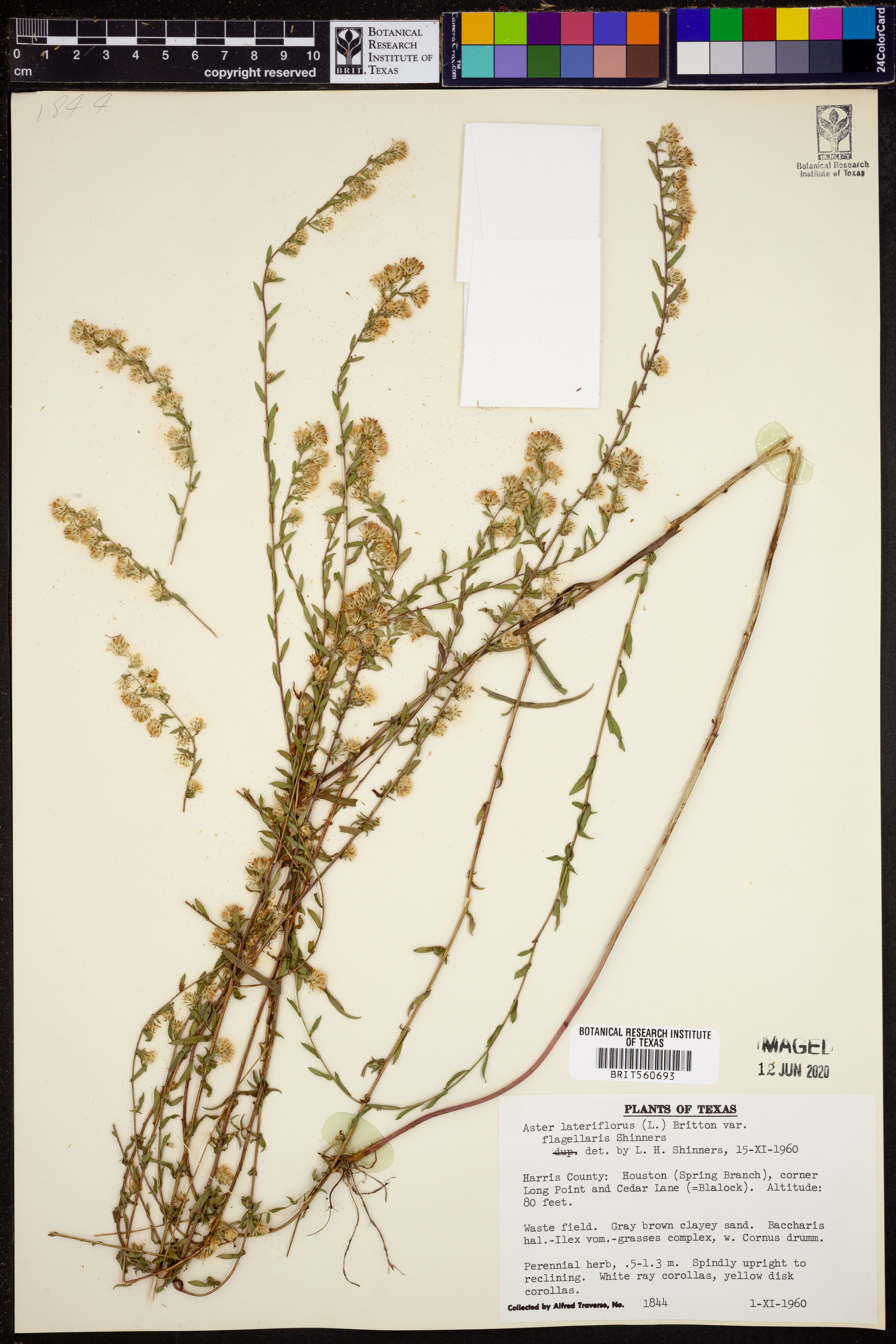
Herbarium specimen of S. lateriflorum var. flagellare

Regarding leaf characteristics, Shinners stated that Aster lateriflorus var. lateriflorus, A. l. var. angustifolius, and A. l. var. pendulus all had pubescent abaxial midribs, but did not say that his two new varieties had the same. He said the opposite: in the protologue for A. lateriflorus var. flagellaris, Shinners wrote in Latin "foliis subter omnino glabris", which in English is "leaves totally glabrous on the abaxial side". Thus, no hair abaxially on the leaves of this variety. In the A. lateriflorus var. indutus protologue, Shinners wrote "foliis subter puberulis super dense scabris", translated to English is "leaves with some hairs on the abaxial side, on the adaxial side densely scabrous". There is no mention of an exclusivity of hair on its midrib either.

The type specimens of Aster lateriflorus var. flagellaris and A. lateriflorus var. indutus were both collected in Texas, the former in 1947 in Henderson County, and the latter in 1946, two miles southeast of Daingerfield, which is in Morris County. Shinners was working from only the type specimen for A. lateriflorus var. indutus, and he viewed multiple specimens for A. lateriflorus var. flagellaris, mostly from Texas, and one from McCurtain County, Oklahoma, which is the southeasternmost county of that state and on the north side of the Red River of the South bordering Texas.

Specimens collected by American botanist Alfred Traverse in Harris County, Texas, and verified by Shinners as A. lateriflorus var. flagellaris are stored at the Botanical Research Institute of Texas Philecology Herbarium, as is one collected in 1934 by American botanist Eula Whitehouse at the Ottine wetlands in Gonzales County, Texas, and determined by German-American botanist Almut Gitter Jones to be A. lateriflorus var. indutus. The current name of Symphyotrichum lateriflorum var. flagellare (Shinners) G.L.Nesom was created in 1994, and the two prior taxa became its taxonomic synonyms.

==== Variety hirsuticaule ====
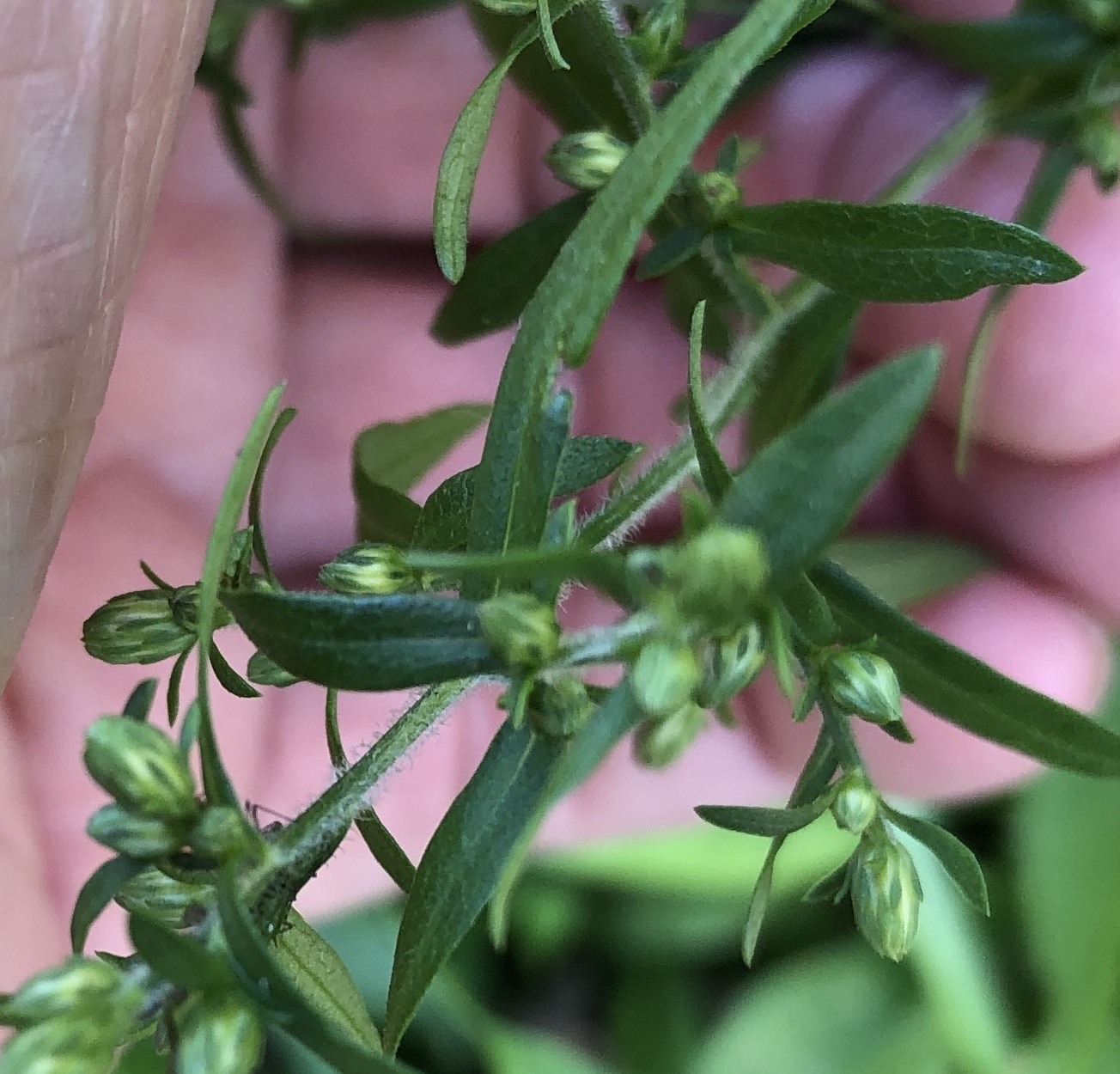
Very pubescent specimen of S. lateriflorum

Symphyotrichum lateriflorum var. hirsuticaule (Lindl. ex DC.) G.L.Nesom is known as rough-stemmed calico aster and starved aster. Aster hirsuticaulis, its basionym, was originally published by Swiss botanist Augustin Pyramus de Candolle in 1836 as having been defined by English botanist John Lindley. Latin hirsuti caulis translates to hairy stem. An abundance of flower cluster stem hair ("caule racemoso hirsutissimo") and the existence of abaxial leaf rib hair ("costâ subtùs hirsutissimâ") were both in the Latin protologue published by de Candolle.

Subsequent authorities reduced Aster hirsuticaulis to infraspecies. (Note: An infraspecies is a taxon below the species rank. It can be a subspecies, variety, subvariety, form, or subform, and a species can have multiple infraspecies.) American botanists John Torrey and Asa Gray did so first in 1841 with A. miser var. hirsuticaulis, using the abaxial pubescent or hirsute (very hairy) midrib as a primary defining factor. They also stated that the leaves of the variety were "more or less hirsute". Gray followed up in 1884 with A. diffusus var. hirsuticaulis. Here, Gray specified an environmental factor, "probably growing in much shade", also writing that the abaxial midrib and the stem were "very hirsute".

In 1894, German botanist and horticulturist Andreas Voss further reduced Aster hirsuticaulis to a form of A. diffusus. Voss placed his form classifications of A. hirsuticaulis and A. bifrons under A. diffusus var. thyrsoideus. He stated that these forms "sind nur üppige, an schattigen und feuchten Orten stehende, lockerer gebaute, höhere Pflanzen", in English, "are just luxurious plants growing at shady and moist places, less branched and taller". That same year, Pennsylvania botanist Thomas Conrad Porter reduced A. hirsuticaulis to a variety of Britton's A. lateriflorus, which took precedence. After Nesom reclassified the varieties from genus Aster to Symphyotrichum, these became taxonomic synonyms of the new Symphyotrichum lateriflorum var. hirsuticaule.

==== Variety horizontale ====
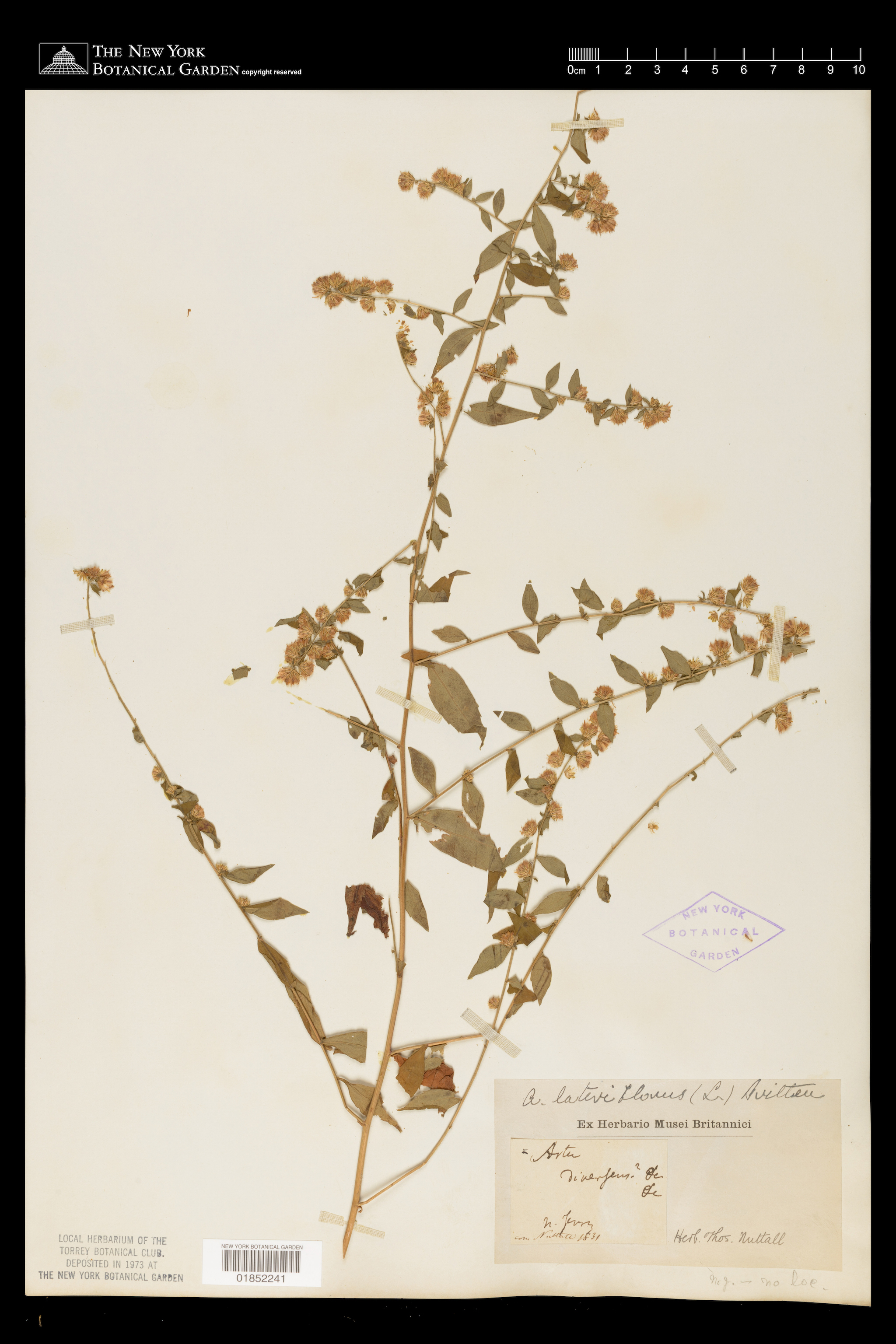
Herbarium specimen identified as S. lateriflorum var. horizontale, collected by T. Nuttall, 1831, in New Jersey

Symphyotrichum lateriflorum var. horizontale (Desf.) G.L.Nesom is commonly called horizontal calico aster. It has been in cultivation in Europe since the mid-1700s, and possibly before. The protologue for the earliest taxonomic synonym, Aster pendulus, was by William Aiton in 1789 who stated that the plant he was describing was cultivated in 1758 by English botanist Philip Miller who was chief gardener at the Chelsea Physic Garden from 1722 to 1770. In the preface of Hortus Kewensis, Aiton wrote that he remembered "several Plants to have been cultivated by Mr. Ph. Miller, in the Physick Garden at Chelsea, though no reference is made to them in [Miller's] Gardener's Dictionary."

Nuttall reduced Aster pendulus to a variety of A. divergens in 1818. In 1833, American botanist Lewis Caleb Beck created A. miser var. pendulus from A. pendulus Aiton. His short description states that the leaves of the branches are "rather remote". In 1829, French botanist René Louiche Desfontaines described and named Aster horizontalis with a focus on ramuli horizontales, or "horizontal branches". In 1884, Asa Gray placed this as a variety of A. diffusus. His description included that it was a "cultivated form ... a plant of the gardens, not exactly matched by indigenous specimens, but evidently of this species." He gave the synonyms as A. horizontalis Desf. and A. recurvatus Willd., the latter described by German botanist Carl Ludwig Willdenow in 1803.

American botanist Oliver Atkins Farwell placed Aster horizontalis Desf. as a variety of A. lateriflorus (L.) Britton, describing it in 1895 as "a tall plant with long straggling horizontal branches". In 1898, Burgess reduced A. pendulus Aiton to a variety of Aster lateriflorus. Finally, Nesom created Symphyotrichum lateriflorum var. horizontale when he moved the varieties to genus Symphyotrichum. Its taxonomic synonyms are listed as Aster horizontalis Desf., A. diffusus var. horizontalis (Desf.) A.Gray, A. lateriflorus var. horizontalis (Desf.) Farw., and A. lateriflorus var. pendulus (Aiton) E.S.Burgess. The Royal Horticultural Society (RHS) presents an Award of Garden Merit as a "seal of approval that the plant performs reliably in the garden". This variety is cultivated and marketed as an ornamental garden plant in Europe and gained this award in 1993.

==== Variety spatelliforme ====
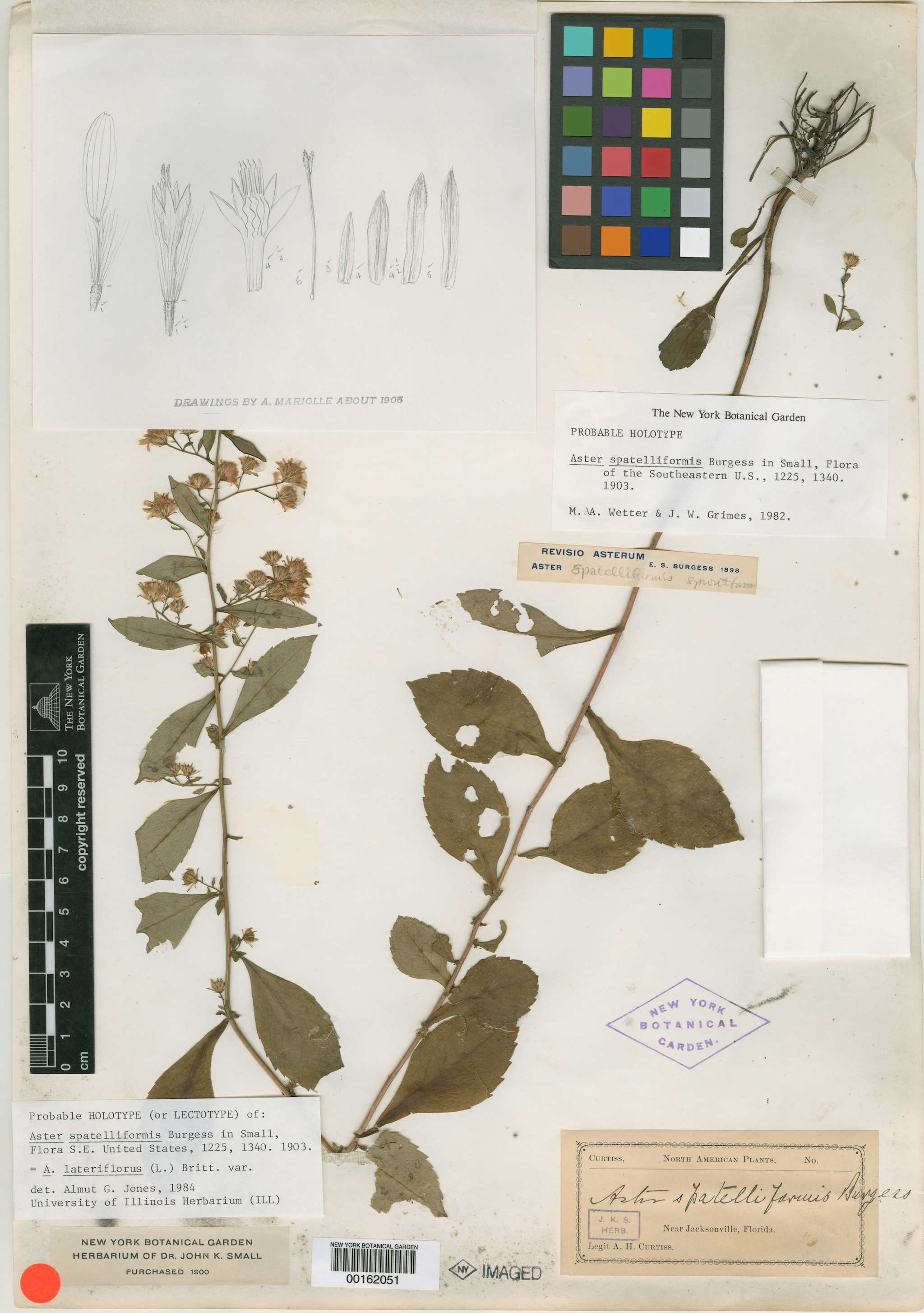
Holotype of Aster spatelliformis E.S.Burgess, from J.K.Small Herbarium, now in the NYBG Steere Herbarium

Symphyotrichum lateriflorum var. spatelliforme (E.S.Burgess) G.L.Nesom was described by Burgess in 1903 as species Aster spatelliformis, making it the basionym of this variety. Burgess' protologue primarily focused on leaf characteristics which he said were how it differed from A. lateriflorus. Leaves were described, in part, as small, rounded, and spatulate-shaped, with fine, reticulate veins and a short wedge-shaped base.

In 1984, Almut Gitter Jones reduced Aster spatelliformis to a variety of A. lateriflorus. In 1982, Löve and Löve began moving species to the genus Symphyotrichum. Two years before, in 1980, Jones had placed Symphyotrichum as a subgenus of Aster. It was not until Nesom's evaluation of Aster sensu lato in 1994 that Jones' subgenus was combined with the genus. After this, Symphyotrichum lateriflorum var. spatelliforme was created, and the two former taxa became its taxonomic synonyms.

==== Variety tenuipes ====
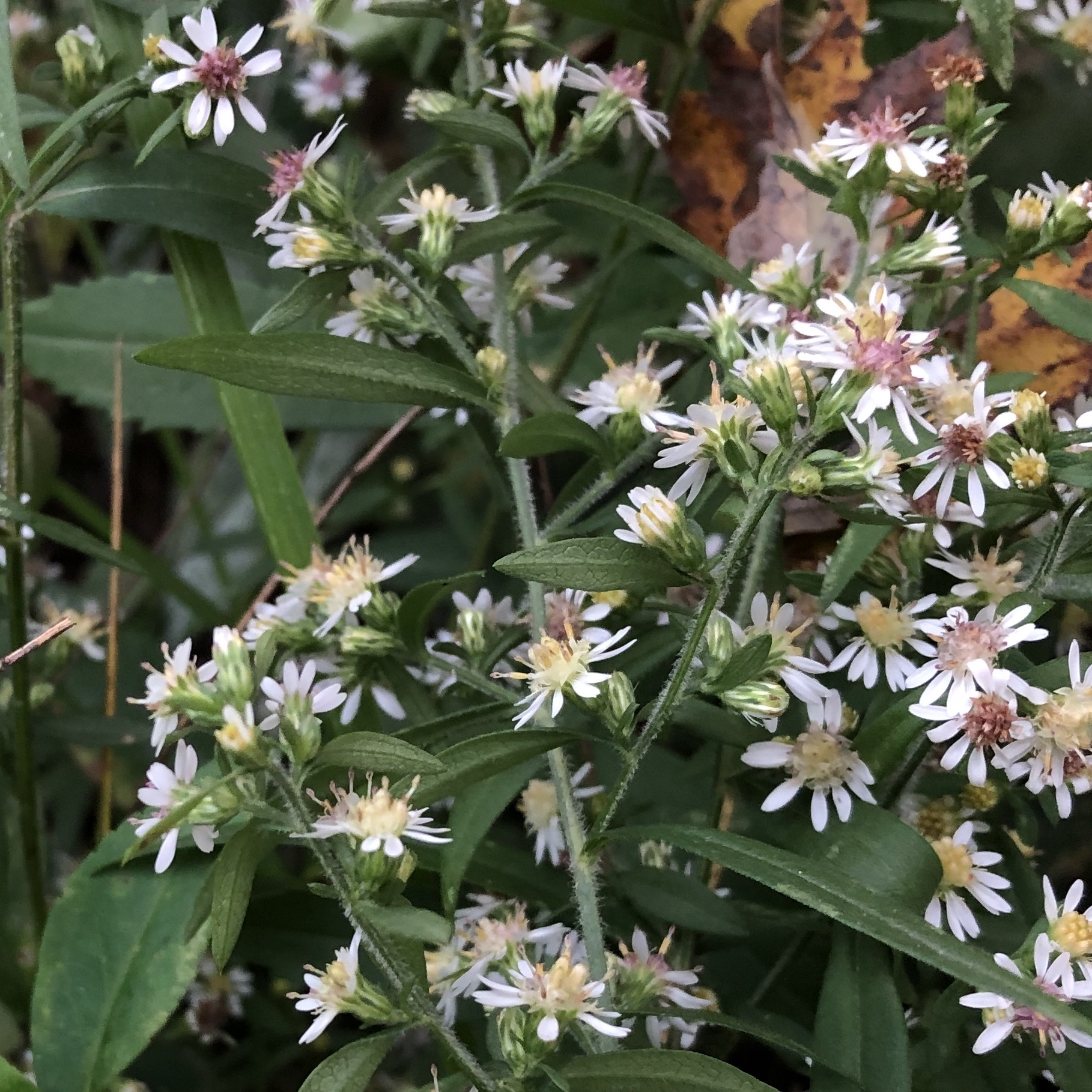
S. lateriflorum plant showing a zigzag growing pattern

Symphyotrichum lateriflorum var. tenuipes (Wiegand) G.L.Nesom is commonly called slender-stalked calico aster. It was said by American botanists Henry A. Gleason and Arthur Cronquist to be a lax plant, with wiry stems, often larger heads in open panicles, and involucres to 6.5 mm. Wiegand first described it as a variety in 1928, Aster lateriflorus var. tenuipes Wiegand, with slender and "somewhat zigzag" stems, larger heads, and longer rays than the standard form of the species. He attached as holotype a specimen from Dundee, Prince Edward Island, collected in 1912 by Fernald, Long & St. John, (Note: Merritt Lyndon Fernald, Bayard Henry Long, and Harold St. John) stored as no. 814 in the Gray Herbarium. (Note: Information about this holotype (without image) is viewable online at the Harvard University Herbaria & Libraries Digital Collections (huh.harvard.edu) — Specimens, Barcode 00936398.)

In 1943, Shinners promoted the variety to species level as Aster tenuipes (Wiegand) Shinners, specifying that it lacked the "pubescent midveins" of A. lateriflorus. This name had been in use since 1898 as Aster tenuipes Makino, native to Japan. The following year, Shinners renamed his to Aster acadiensis Shinners. Nesom created Symphyotrichum lateriflorum var. tenuipes when he moved the varieties to genus Symphyotrichum. These three names, Aster lateriflorus var. tenuipes Wiegand, A. tenuipes (Wiegand) Shinners, and A. acadiensis Shinners, are now its taxonomic synonyms.

=== Hybrids ===
The following naturally occurring hybrids have been reported:

- S. dumosum × S. lateriflorum
- S. cordifolium × S. lateriflorum
- S. laeve var. laeve × S. lateriflorum
- S. lanceolatum subsp. lanceolatum × S. lateriflorum
- S. puniceum × S. lateriflorum

=== Etymology ===
The specific epithet (second part of the scientific name) lateriflorum is a combination of the Latin words for side and flower, so named because the flowers are seen to grow on one side of the branches. Symphyotrichum lateriflorum is commonly known as calico aster, starved aster, white woodland aster, side-flowering aster, side-flower aster, goblet aster, one-side aster, one-sided aster, farewell summer, and calico American-aster. Along with other asters that bloom in the fall, S. lateriflorum may be called a Michaelmas daisy. There are Indigenous American names for this plant including the Meskwaki word no'sîkûn and the Potawatomi word pûkwänä'sîkûn, both as spelled by ethnobotanist Huron Herbert Smith.

Aster comes from the Ancient Greek word ἀστήρ (astḗr), meaning star, referring to the shape of the flower. The word aster was used to describe a star-like flower as early as 1542 in De historia stirpium commentarii insignes, a book by the German physician and botanist Leonhart Fuchs. An old common name for Astereae species using the suffix -wort is starwort, also spelled star-wort or star wort. An early use of this name can be found in the same work by Fuchs as Sternkraut, translated from German literally as star herb (Stern Kraut). The name star-wort was in use by Aiton in his 1789 Hortus Kewensis. Scientific names that were later changed to be taxonomic synonyms of Symphyotrichum lateriflorum had common names such as diffuse white-flower'd star-wort and pendulus star-wort in this work (Aster diffusus and Aster pendulus, respectively).

== Distribution and habitat ==
=== Distribution ===
Symphyotrichum lateriflorum has been found in the wild in the United States in all states east of the Mississippi River; in the states on the west Mississippi River bank (Minnesota, Iowa, Missouri, Arkansas, and Louisiana); and, in the western states of South Dakota, Nebraska, Kansas, Oklahoma, and Texas. It is also present in the Canadian provinces of Manitoba, Ontario, Quebec, New Brunswick, and Prince Edward Island. In Mexico, it is present in the state of Veracruz. S. lateriflorum is native throughout its current North American range. The USDA PLANTS Database records a presence in British Columbia, but Flora of North America states that it was an ephemeral there that did not persist. Varietal distributions have been recorded as follows:

- S. lateriflorum var. angustifolium has been found in Ontario, as well as in the U.S. region of New England except Rhode Island, and in the states of Indiana, Kentucky, Michigan, New Jersey, New York, and Wisconsin.
- S. lateriflorum var. flagellare is documented in Oklahoma and Texas.
- S. lateriflorum var. hirsuticaule is documented in Ontario, Nova Scotia, Prince Edward Island, and New Brunswick. Because it is considered a taxonomic synonym and not a variety of the species in most databases, United States distribution data cannot be found.
- S. lateriflorum var. horizontale has been found in New Brunswick, and in all U.S. states east of the Mississippi River excluding Indiana, Ohio, Virginia, South Carolina, and Louisiana. Also present west of the Mississippi in Minnesota, Missouri, and Arkansas.
- S. lateriflorum var. spatelliforme has been found in Florida.
- S. lateriflorum var. tenuipes is known from Nova Scotia, Prince Edward Island, Maine, Michigan, New Hampshire, New York, and Vermont.

S. lateriflorum is reported as an introduced species in Belgium, France, Italy, and Switzerland. As of 2021, it was not on the European Union's List of invasive alien species of Union concern.

=== Habitat ===
Habitat can vary considerably, including wet to dry-mesic woodlands and savannas, floodplain woodlands, fens, marshes, wet to wet-mesic prairies, and high water table old fields. Symphyotrichum lateriflorum has been found on banks, in thickets, and on shores usually in rather dry, but also in damp or even wet, sandy or gravelly soil. S. lateriflorum is categorized on the United States National Wetland Plant List (NWPL) with Wetland Indicator Status Ratings of Facultative Wetland (FACW) and Facultative (FAC), depending on wetland region. In the Atlantic and Gulf Coastal Plain (AGCP) and Northcentral and Northeast (NCNE) regions, it is a Facultative Plant (FAC), choosing wetlands or non-wetlands and adjusting accordingly. In the Eastern Mountains and Piedmont (EMP), Great Plains (GP), and Midwest (MW) regions, it is a Facultative Wetland Plant (FACW), usually occurring in wetlands, but not out of necessity. In these regions, it is less likely to, but may choose non-wetlands.

Companions or associates depend upon the environment where Symphyotrichum lateriflorum is growing. Nearby naturally occurring native North American trees can include silver maple (Acer saccharinum), ash-leaved maple or boxelder (Acer negundo), common hackberry (Celtis occidentalis), downy hawthorn (Crataegus mollis), the critically endangered green ash (Fraxinus pennsylvanica), common elderberry (Sambucus canadensis), and the endangered American elm (Ulmus americana). Some companion Symphyotrichum species are Drummond's aster (S. drummondii), shining aster (S. firmum), panicled aster (S. lanceolatum), New England aster (S. novae-angliae), and purplestem aster (S. puniceum).

== Ecology ==
Symphyotrichum lateriflorum is considered a weed species in Canada and the United States. It is not considered a noxious weed in either country. Canadian botanists Jerry G. Chmielewski and John C. Semple called it "probably the least weedy of the weedy aster species in Canada". S. lateriflorum has coefficients of conservatism (C-value) in the Floristic Quality Assessment (FQA) that range from 1 to 10 depending on evaluation region. The lower the C-value, the higher tolerance the species has for disturbance. In the case of a low C-value, there is lesser likelihood that the plant is growing in an undisturbed or remnant habitat with native flora and fauna. For example, in the Atlantic coastal pine barrens of Massachusetts, New York, and Rhode Island, S. lateriflorum has been given a C-value of 1, meaning its presence in locations of that ecoregion provides little or no confidence of a remnant habitat. In contrast, in the Dakotas, S. lateriflorum has a C-value of 10, meaning its populations there are not weedy and are restricted to only remnant habitats which have a very low tolerance for environmental degradation.

=== Reproduction ===
Calico aster's primary means of reproduction is through pollination, which occurs with the help of short or mid-length tongued insects that are able to manipulate the small flower heads successfully and transfer pollen from one plant to another. The use of pollen from one plant to fertilize another is called cross-pollination and is required by this species. Any occasional self-pollination produces only a few viable seeds. As an adaptive mechanism, the flower heads of Symphyotrichum lateriflorum "go to sleep" at night. The flower heads close the ray florets around the disk florets. This may help protect and preserve the pollen within. Reproduction also can occur through cloning via the plant's short rhizomatic structure. Typically, this causes the formation of small groups rather than large colonies, because S. lateriflorum is not a large colony-producing species. It is more likely for any vegetative reproduction (non-seed reproduction) to form within a clump.

Diagram of ray floret
1. corolla
2. style
3. stigma
4. calyx
5. ovary

Diagram of disk floret
1. stigma
2. style
3. anthers
4. corolla
5. calyx
6. ovary

Ray florets in the Symphyotrichum genus are exclusively female, each having a pistil (with style, stigma, and ovary) but no stamen. Ray florets accept pollen and each can develop a seed, but they produce no pollen. The ray florets of S. lateriflorum bloom earlier and are likely receptive to pollen longer than the disk florets.

Each ray floret has three petals which are fused together to form a corolla. The floret has one ovary at the bottom, and this ovary contains one ovule. (Note: Asteraceae ovaries are called inferior because each has only one ovule and can produce only one seed. See also Asteraceae § Floral structures and Gynoecium.) The ovary has an attached style that extends outward from between the ray floret corolla and the rest of the flower head. As the ray floret is blooming, the stigma at the top of the style splits into two lobes to allow pollen to access the ovary.

Disk florets in the Symphyotrichum genus are androgynous, each with both male (stamen, anthers, and filaments) and female reproductive parts; thus, a disk floret produces pollen and can develop a seed. The disk floret has five petals, sometimes referred to as lobes, which are fused into its own corolla in the shape of a tube. When the disk floret of S. lateriflorum is blooming, the corolla lobes separate to about 50–75% the length of the corolla.

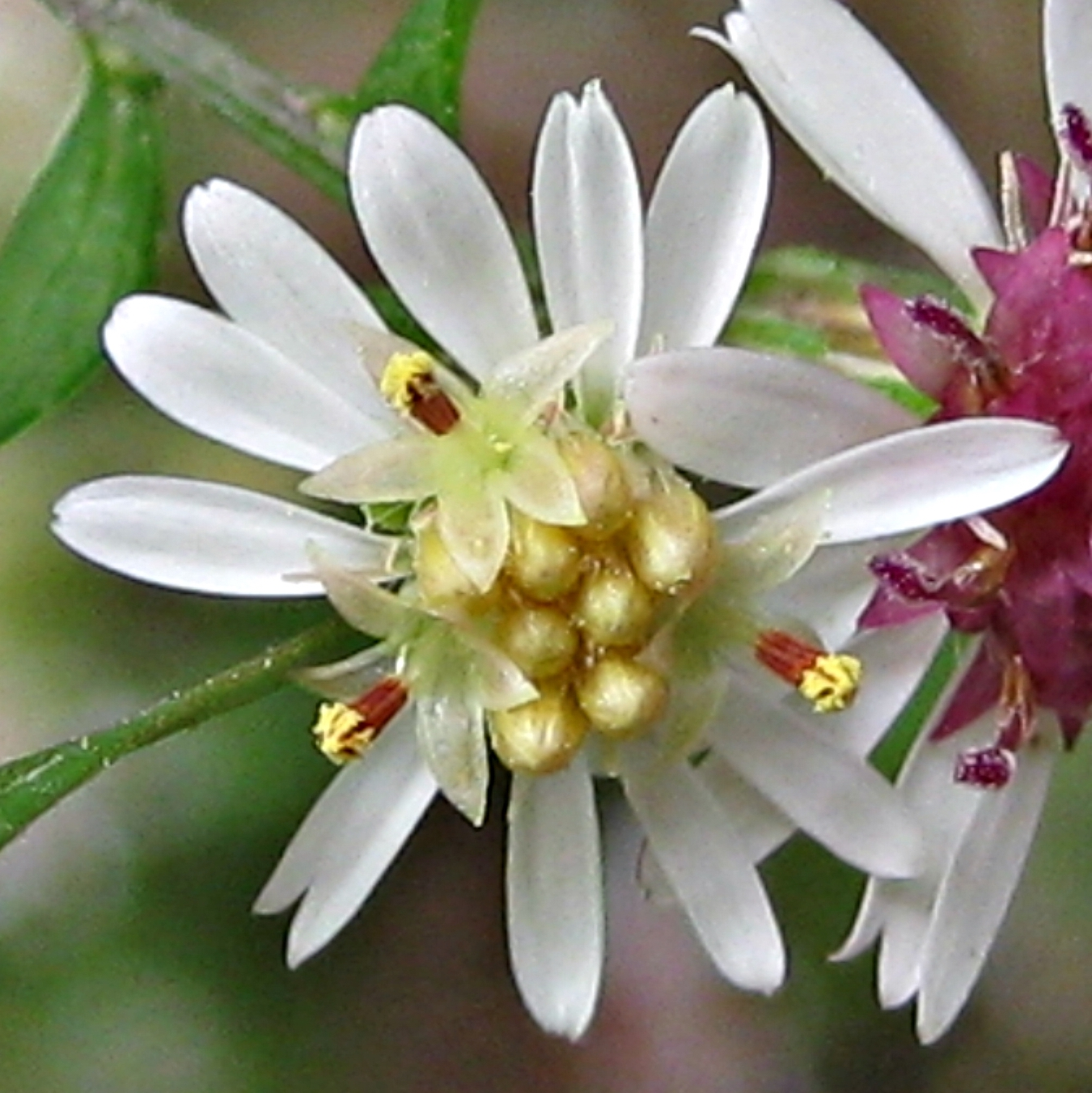
Close-up of a S. lateriflorum flower head showing open and closed disk florets with three elongated stamens, styles and stigmas covered in pollen and not visible

The male stamen is inside the tube-shaped corolla of the disk floret. It has five anthers, five filaments, and produces pollen. The anthers and filaments are readily visible as separate entities in non-Asteraceae species. Here, they are fused together to form a cylinder, or tube, with their pollen on the inside only. This male anther cylinder surrounds the female style and stigma. As the style is maturing, it elongates up through the anther cylinder, gathering the pollen on its stigma along the way.

The ovary is at the bottom of the disk floret style. As with the ray floret, the disk floret stigma has two lobes that are fused together. The disk floret's stigma stays closed while pollen is on it, keeping its ovary safe from self-pollination. After the pollen has been collected and carried off by one or more pollinators, the stigma begins to split into two lobes, opening the style so that the disk floret ovary becomes accessible to receive pollen from another plant.

When pollination is complete, the seeds become ripe in 3–4 weeks, hardening and developing pappi. They are then wind dispersed. Usually, the seeds will have their dried corollas attached as they depart.

=== Pollinators and nectar-seekers ===
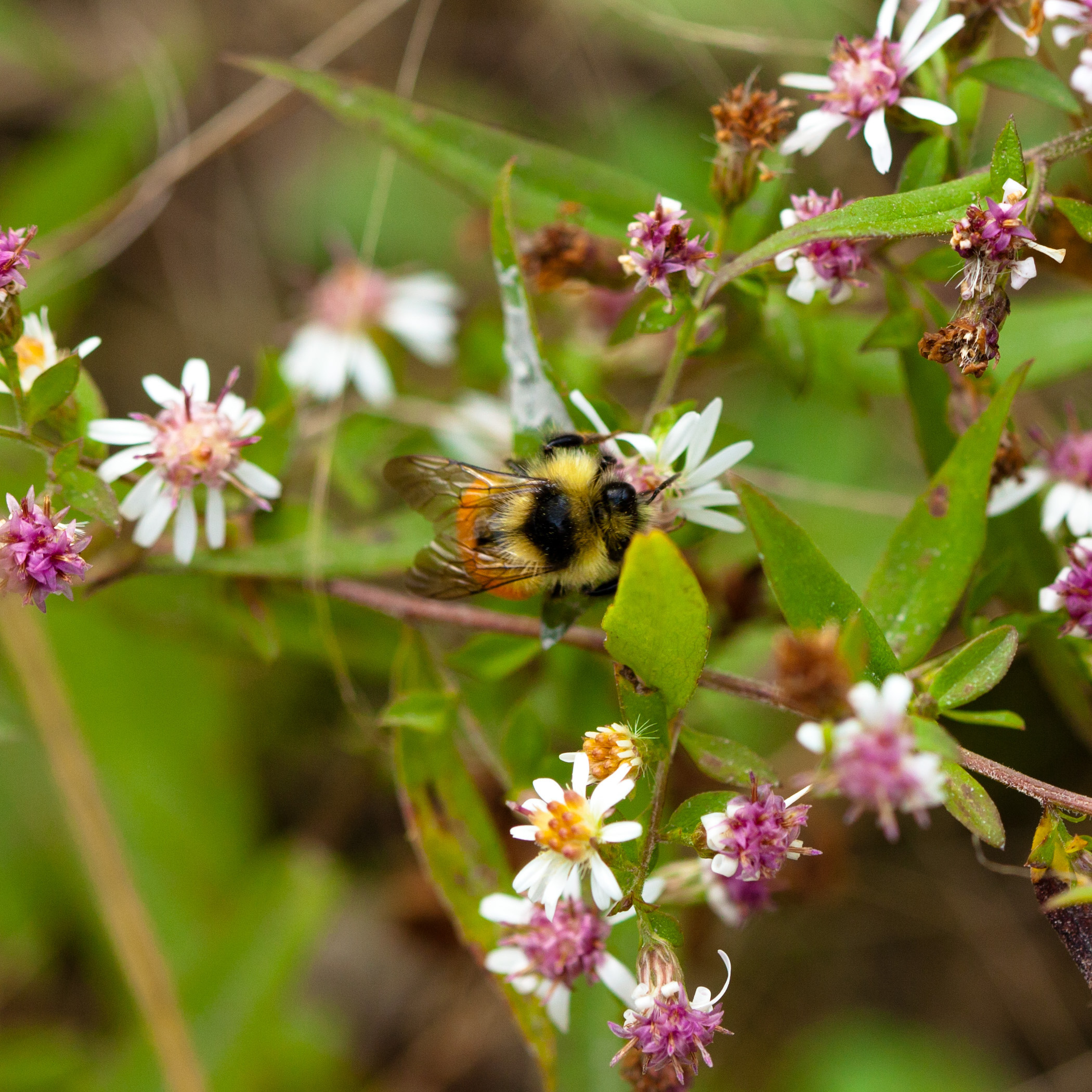
Tricolored bumblebee (Bombus ternarius) pollinating S. lateriflorum

Pollinators and nectar-seekers include short and mid-length tongued insects such as common eastern bumblebee (Bombus impatiens), European honeybee (Apis mellifera), eastern yellowjacket (Vespula maculifrons), bald-faced hornet (Dolichovespula maculata), cloudy-winged miner bee (Andrena nubecula), the miner bees Pseudopanurgus andrenoides and Pseudopanurgus compositarum, and the apoid wasp Cerceris kennicottii.

Sweat bees and hoverflies also visit the flowers. Some that have been recorded include the bristle sweat bee (Lasioglossum imitatum), Cresson's metallic sweat bee (Lasioglossum cressonii), experienced sweat bee (Lasioglossum versatum), golden green sweat bee (Augochlorella aurata), leathery sweat bee (Lasioglossum coriaceum), nightmare sweat bee (Lasioglossum ephialtum), and pure golden green sweat bee (Augochlora pura). The hoverfly species Eristalis arbustorum, Eristalis dimidiata, and the calligrapher fly (Toxomerus marginatus) also have been recorded visiting the flowers.

=== Pests and diseases ===
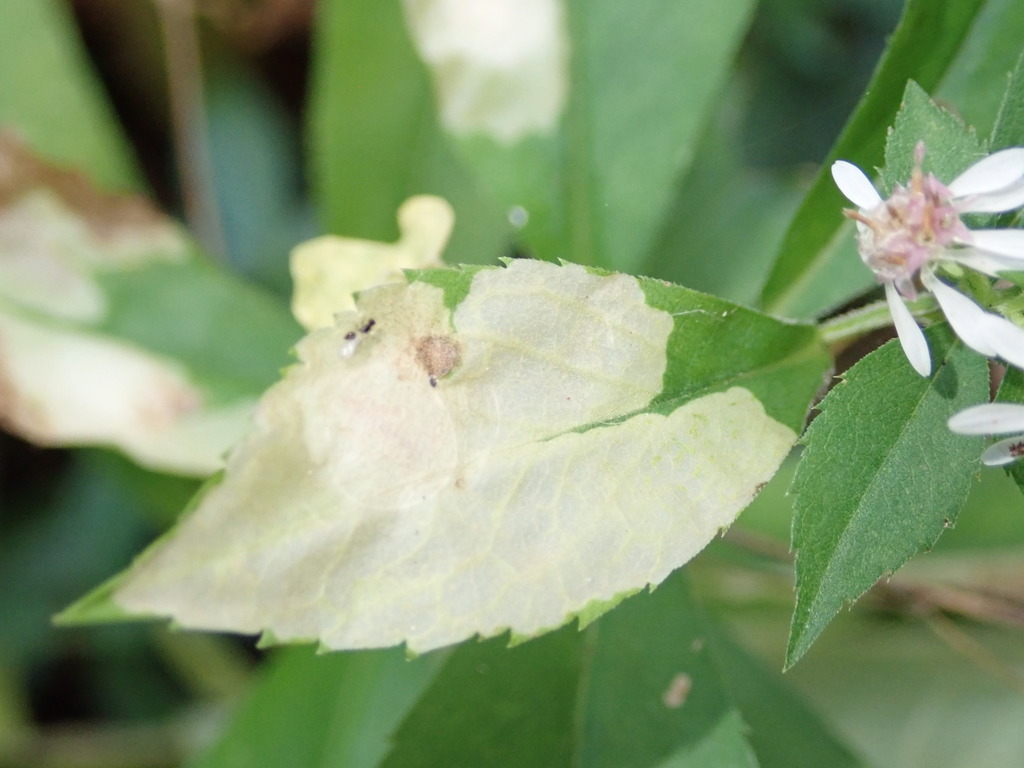
Leaf miner Astrotischeria astericola damage on calico aster

Banded woolly bear caterpillars (larvae of the isabella tiger moth Pyrrharctia isabella) eat the leaves, as do the larvae of the green owlet (Leuconycta diphteroides). Symphyotrichum lateriflorum is also host to the pearl crescent butterfly (Phyciodes tharos) and the silvery checkerspot (Charidryas harrisii). Leaf miners also eat the leaves, including the leaf blotch miner Acrocercops astericola and the "trumpet" leaf miner Astrotischeria astericola. The larvae of the Coleophora silk case-bearing moth Coleophora dextrella feed on the seeds, and the galls produced by the midge Rhopalomyia lateriflori occur in the axillary buds where their larvae can develop. Fungal diseases include the rusts Puccinia dioicae and Puccinia asteris, which can occur on the leaves, and Symphyotrichum species are very commonly infected by the powdery mildew Golovinomyces asterum.

== Conservation ==
NatureServe lists Symphyotrichum lateriflorum as Secure (G5) worldwide, and S. lateriflorum var. lateriflorum is Critically Imperiled (S1) in Kansas and Nebraska. S. lateriflorum var. angustifolium is possibly Imperiled (S2) in Kentucky, and S. lateriflorum var. horizontale is Imperiled (S2) in New Jersey.

== Uses ==
=== Medicinal ===
In 1928, ethnobotanist Huron Herbert Smith documented the Meskwaki use of this plant as a psychological aid using the "blossoms as a smudge 'to cure a crazy person who has lost his mind'", and as an herbal steam using the entire plant "as a smoke or steam in sweatbath". The Meskwaki word is no'sîkûn, and the Potawatomi pûkwänä'sîkûn. Both words mean "smoke a person". In her 1979 book Use of Plants for the Past 500 Years, Charlotte Erichsen-Brown documented that the Mohawk people use an infusion of this plant with Symphyotrichum novae-angliae to treat fever.

=== Gardening ===
Symphyotrichum lateriflorum is said to be hardy to USDA Zone 3 (to −40 °C (−40 °F)). An adult plant can be propagated by division of the rootstock, although this is needed only every few years. It will grow well in shade or sun, and in any soil with some moisture.

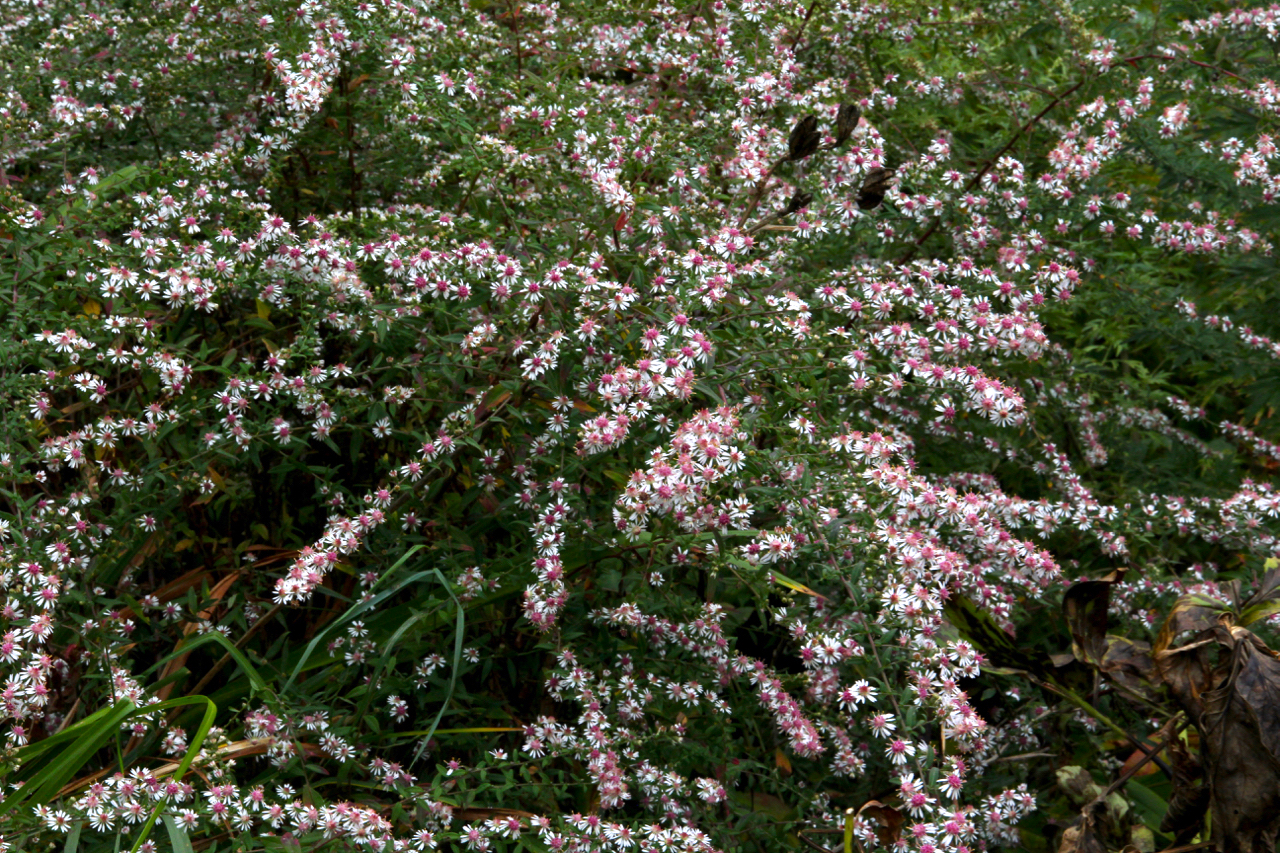
S. lateriflorum var. horizontale in a European garden in full bloom

The earliest record of the species in gardens was of a taxonomic synonym of S. lateriflorum var. horizontale called Aster pendulus. It was cultivated by Philip Miller by 1758. Miller was chief gardener at the Chelsea Physic Garden from 1722 to 1770. A physic garden is one devoted to medicinal plants. This variety is still often called Aster lateriflorus var. horizontalis and is sometimes labeled in cultivar form as 'Horizontalis'. S. lateriflorum var. horizontale gained the RHS Award of Garden Merit in 1993.

Symphyotrichum lateriflorum var. horizontale is listed as very hardy with RHS Hardiness Rating H7, which is to below −20 °C (−4 °F). The RHS Plant Finder suggests it for flower borders and beds of cottage and informal gardens, growing in an open location with full sun and well-drained moderately fertile soil.

==== Cultivars ====
Marketed cultivars of calico aster can be found using common names and the current and previous scientific names. Below is an alphabetical list of some probable or definite cultivars of Symphyotrichum lateriflorum with descriptions and history when available.

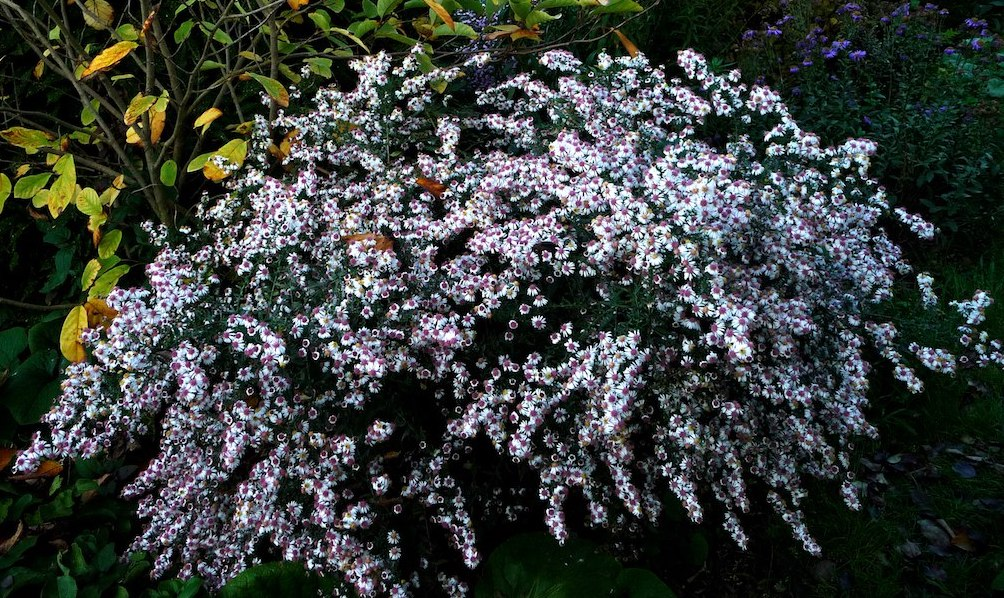
'Chloe' in full bloom

'Bleke Bet' reaches a height of 120 cm (4 ft), has dark leaves, and 18 mm (3/4 in) diameter flowers with rose to purple centers and white ray florets.

'Buck's Fizz' has 13 mm (1/2 in) diameter flowers that have white rays with pink to purple disks, and leaves with "bronze-purple tints". It is reported to reach a maximum height of 60 cm (2 ft).

'Cassiope' is listed as a cultivar of S. lateriflorum var. lateriflorum and is without description in the RHS Plant Finder as of 2021. It was introduced as early as 1910 as a cultivar of Aster vimineus.

'Chaevis Callsope', last listed in the 2000 RHS Plant Finder, is without description as of 2021.

'Chloe' has an active listing in the RHS Plant Finder as of 2021.

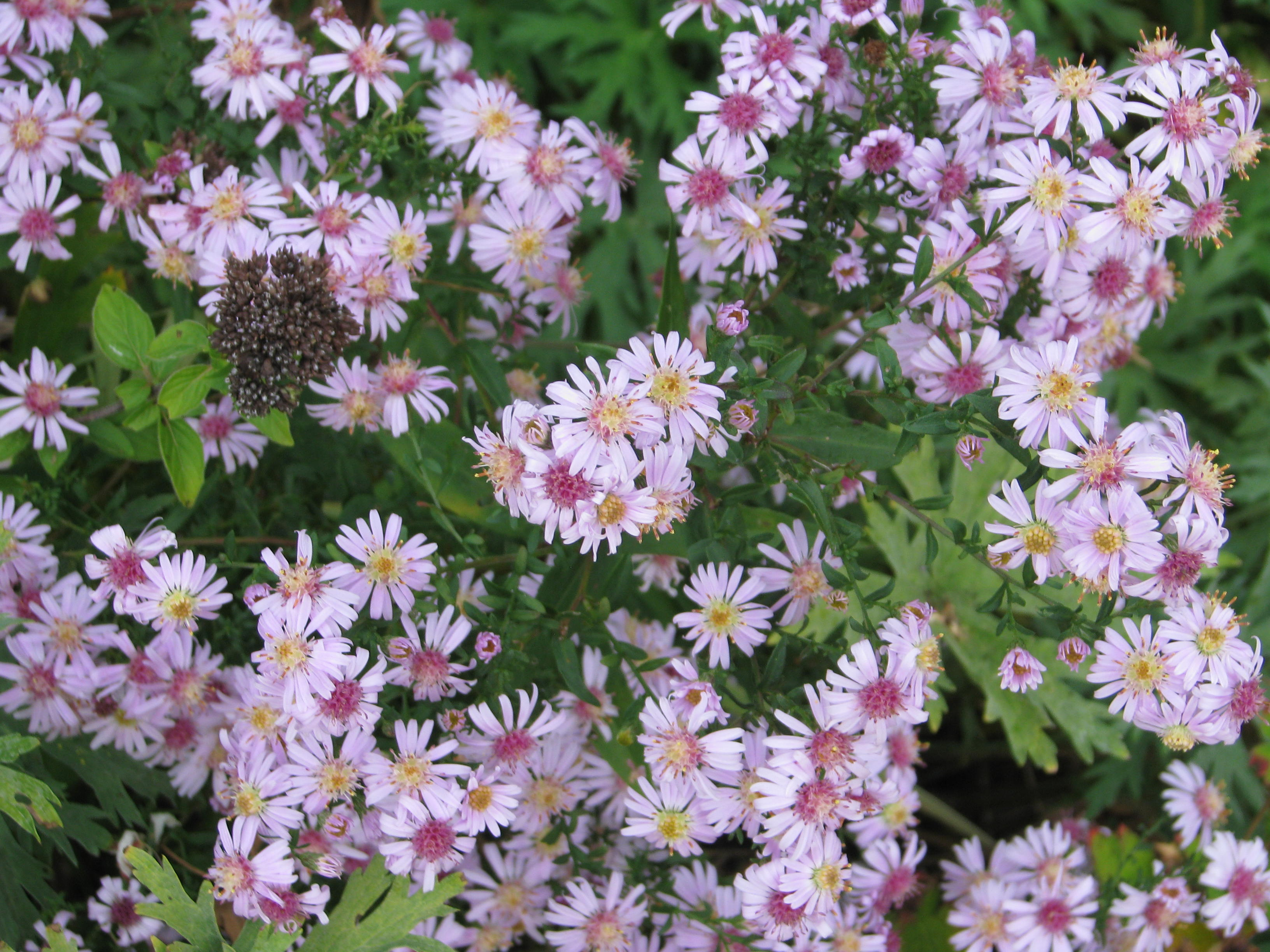
'Coombe Fishacre' in a garden in England

'Coombe Fishacre', found in the RHS Plant Finder simply as Symphyotrichum 'Coombe Fishacre' without a species name, won the RHS Award of Garden Merit in 1993. It has multiple common or marketing synonyms and is offered both as a cultivar of Aster novi-belgii (Symphyotrichum novi-belgii, New York Aster) and as a hybrid of both. RHS shows another synonym, Aster coelestis 'Coombe Fishacre'. Aster diffusus var. horizontalis was its parent according to the following passage from the periodical Gardening World Illustrated (1898). That variety is the S. lateriflorum var. horizontale of today.

The comparatively new variety [of Michaelmas Daisy], Coombe Fishacre, which was raised by Mr. Archer Hind, is in magnificent condition at Long Ditton at the present time, and the plants are conspicuous amongst all the rest by reason of their extreme floriferousness. The bronzy-red and white flowers much resemble those of A. diffusus horizontalis, its parent, but they are larger and finer. The height is about 3 1/2 ft.

'Coombe Fishacre' is said to be hardy to RHS H7, bloom in late summer and autumn, and in 2–5 years reach a height of 50–100 cm (1 3/4–3 1/4 ft) and width of 10–50 cm (1/4–1 3/4 ft).

'Daisy Bush' was introduced in 1993 and has green leaves and bushy branches of flower heads that are 20 mm (4/5 in) diameter, with white rays and pale yellow disks. It reaches a height of 70 cm (2 1/5 ft). It was last listed in the RHS Plant Finder in 1997.

'Datschi' was last listed in the RHS Plant Finder in 2018. According to Paul Picton, author of The Gardener's Guide to Growing Asters, 'Datschi' was introduced before 1920. It has flower heads 13 mm (1/2 in) diameter, white rays, pale yellow disk florets that are less likely to change color, deep green leaves, and reaches a height of 120 cm (4 ft). There was a cultivar named Datschi in the RHS Autumn 1919 trials at Wisely assigned to their type diffusus, which is not explicitly said to be an Aster diffusus cultivar but is more descriptive of that growing habit. It had single white flowers reported as 3/8–1/2 inch diameter that bloomed from 23 October 1919–5 November 1919, and it reached a height of 4 ft.

'Delight' was last listed in the RHS Plant Finder in 2007. It was introduced before 1902. The flower heads are 13 mm (1/2 in) diameter with white reflexed rays and creamy-yellow disks, and it reaches a height of 90 cm (3 ft).

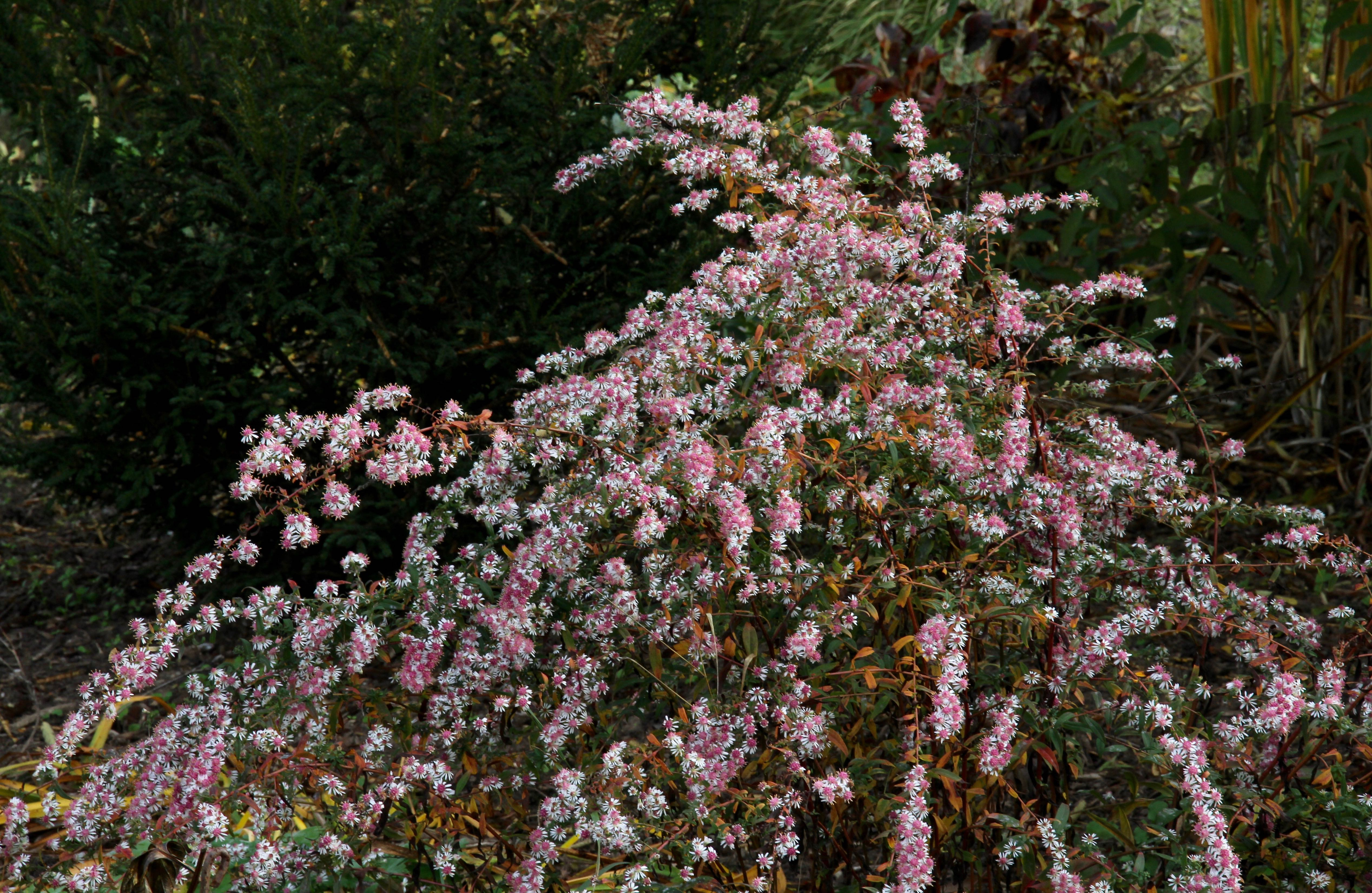
'Lady in Black'

'Golden Rain' is listed as a cultivar of S. lateriflorum var. lateriflorum and is without description in the RHS Plant Finder as of 2021. Picton lists it as a cultivar of Aster vimineus "with creamy-white ray florets and deep yellow disks" that was introduced around 1910 by H.J. Jones from his Lewisham nursery. It reaches a height of 45 cm (1 1/2 ft).

'Jan', introduced in 1992, has large flower heads for a cultivar of this species at 30 mm (1 1/3 in) diameter. Reaching a height of 80–100 cm (2 1/2–3 1/4 ft), it has green leaves with white and lilac blooms.

'Lady in Black' was introduced in 1991. It has bronze and dark purple leaves with flowers that have white rays and "rosy-pink" centers. It reaches a height of 100–150 cm (3 1/4–5 ft) and width of 50–100 cm (1 3/4–3 1/4 ft) in 2–5 years, and is hardy to RHS H7.

'Lovely' is listed in the RHS Plant Finder as of 2021.

'Orphir' is listed as a cultivar of S. lateriflorum var. lateriflorum and is without description in the RHS Plant Finder as of 2021. Picton lists it as a cultivar of Aster vimineus dating to as early as 1910.

'Prince', introduced circa 1970, is reaches a height of 60 cm (2 ft). It has dark purple foliage with 13 mm (1/2 in) diameter flower heads.

'Prince Charming' is listed as a cultivar of S. lateriflorum var. lateriflorum and is without description in the RHS Plant Finder as of 2021. Picton lists 'Prince Charming' as a cultivar of Aster vimineus dating to as early as 1910.

'Rubrifolius' was last listed in the 2001 RHS Plant Finder. Translated from Latin, rubri folium means red leaf or red foliage. No description was readily available about this cultivar as of 2021.

'Valentin' is described in the Dutch magazine TUINSeizoen as a cultivar with white to pale lilac flowers that bloom September to November, with an adult height of about 76 cm (2 1/2 ft). It is hardy to −30 °C (−22 °F) and does best in an open sunny location with well-drained, moderately fertile, and moist soil.
