= Coleophora dextrella =

Scientific classification
- Kingdom: Animalia
- Phylum: Arthropoda
- Clade: Pancrustacea
- Class: Insecta
- Order: Lepidoptera
- Family: Coleophoridae
- Genus: Coleophora
- Species: C. dextrella

Binomial name
- Coleophora dextrella Braun, 1940

Species of insect

Coleophora dextrella is a moth of the family Coleophoridae. It is found in North America, including Nova Scotia and North Carolina.

The larvae feed on the seeds of Symphyotrichum cordifolium, Symphyotrichum lateriflorum and Symphyotrichum novi-belgii. They create a trivalved, tubular silken case.
