= Lasioglossum ephialtum =

Scientific classification
- Domain: Eukaryota
- Kingdom: Animalia
- Phylum: Arthropoda
- Class: Insecta
- Order: Hymenoptera
- Family: Halictidae
- Tribe: Halictini
- Genus: Lasioglossum
- Species: L. ephialtum

Binomial name
- Lasioglossum ephialtum (Gibbs, 2010)

Species of insect

Lasioglossum ephialtum is a species of sweat bee in the family Halictidae. A common name is nightmare sweat bee.
