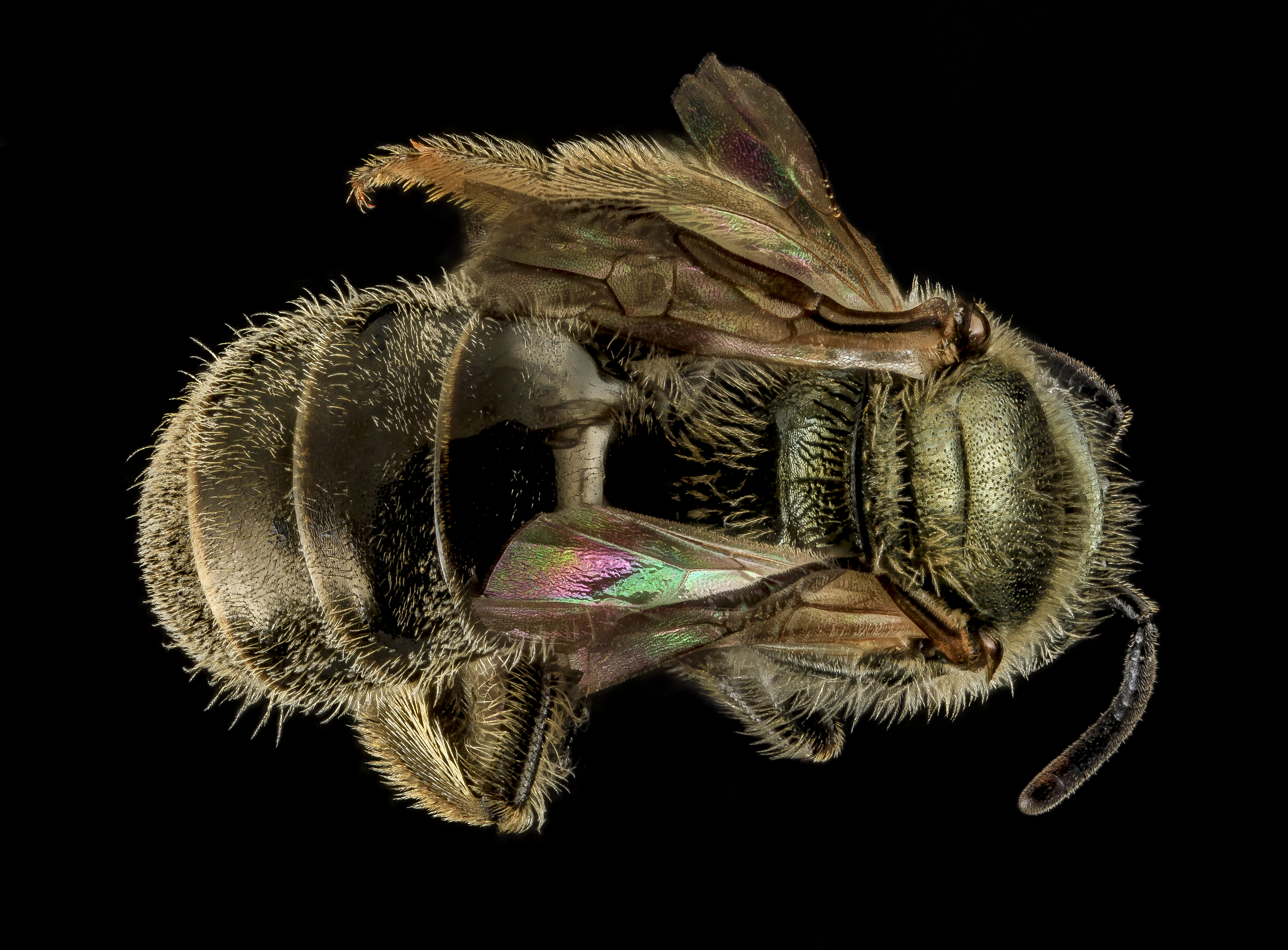

Scientific classification
- Domain: Eukaryota
- Kingdom: Animalia
- Phylum: Arthropoda
- Class: Insecta
- Order: Hymenoptera
- Family: Halictidae
- Tribe: Halictini
- Genus: Lasioglossum
- Species: L. versatum

Binomial name
- Lasioglossum versatum (Robertson, 1902)

= Lasioglossum versatum =

Species of insect

Lasioglossum versatum is a species of sweat bee in the family Halictidae. A common name is Experienced sweat bee.
