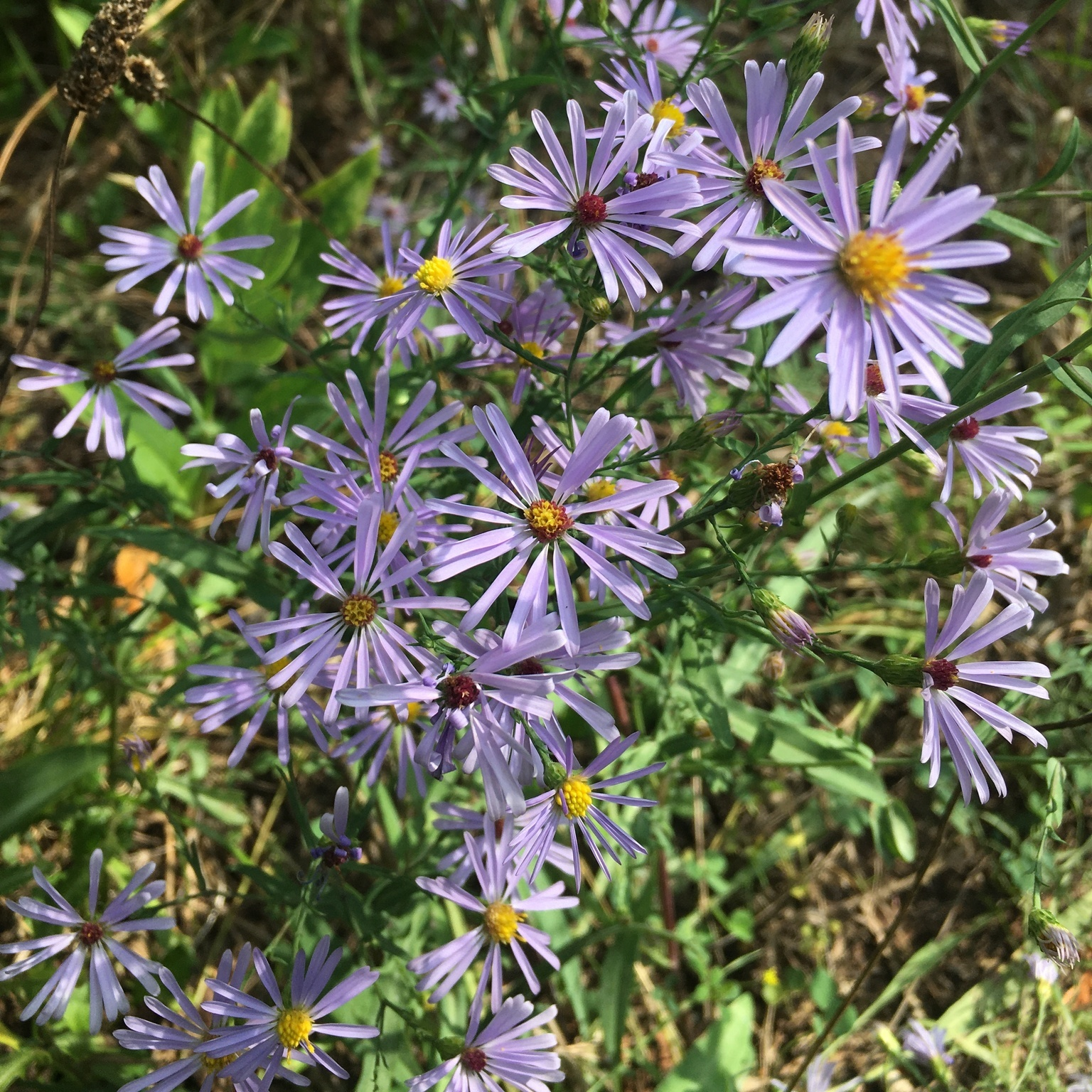

Conservation status
- Secure (NatureServe)

Scientific classification
- Kingdom: Plantae
- Clade: Tracheophytes
- Clade: Angiosperms
- Clade: Eudicots
- Clade: Asterids
- Order: Asterales
- Family: Asteraceae
- Genus: Symphyotrichum
- Subgenus: Symphyotrichum subg. Symphyotrichum
- Section: Symphyotrichum sect. Symphyotrichum
- Species: S. laeve

Binomial name
- Symphyotrichum laeve (L.) Á.Löve & D.Löve

Varieties
- S. laeve var. laeve; S. laeve var. concinnum (Willd.) G.L.Nesom; S. laeve var. geyeri (A.Gray) G.L.Nesom; S. laeve var. purpuratum (Nees) G.L.Nesom
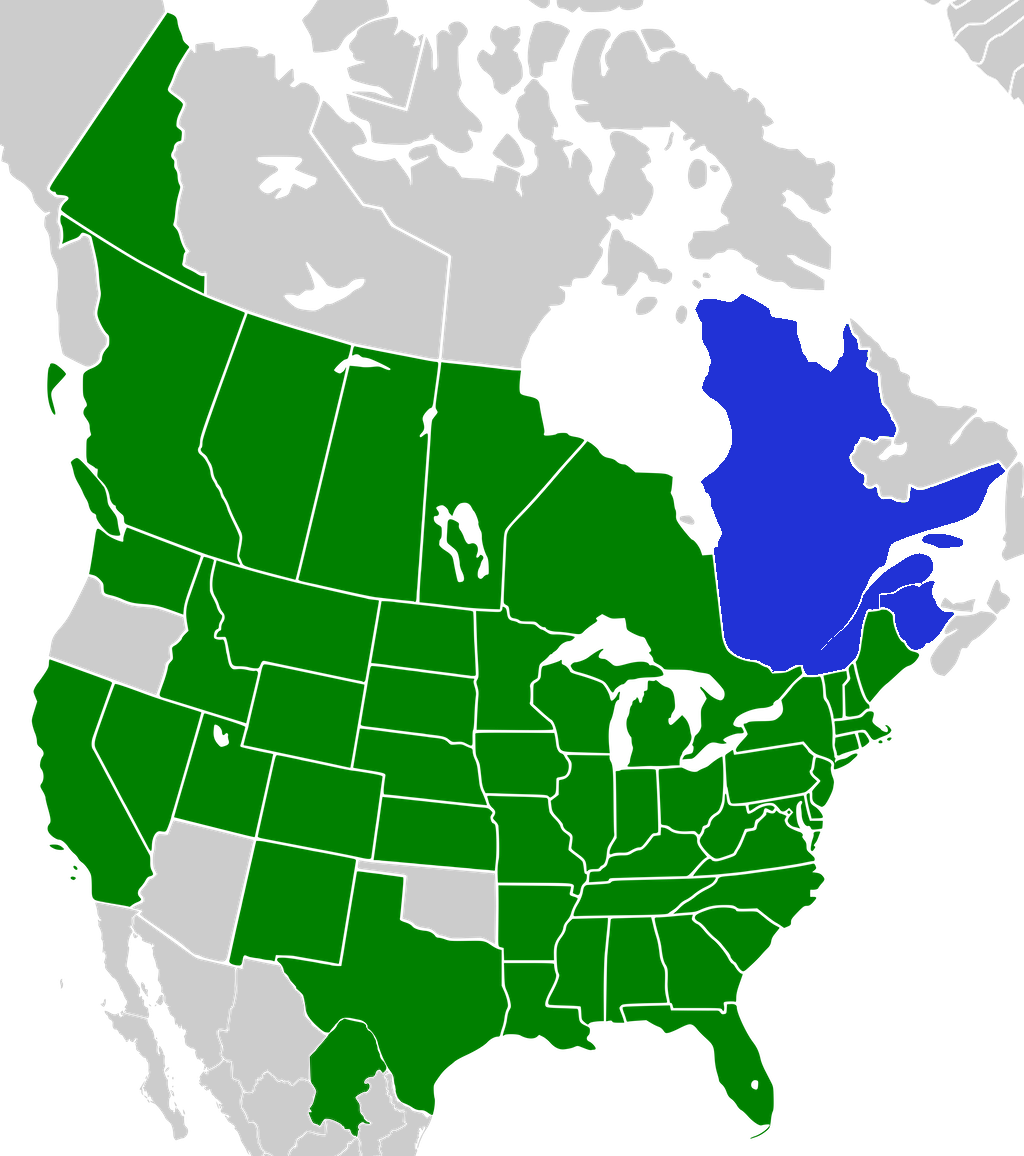
- North American distribution

Synonyms
- Basionym: Aster laevis L.; Alphabetical list: Aster amplexicaulis Muhl. ex Willd.; Aster autranii Post; Aster bupleurifolius Nees; Aster cyaneus Hoffm.; Aster decorus Desf. ex DC.; Aster expansus Nees; Aster falcidens E.S.Burgess; Aster glaucescens Wender. ex Nees; Aster glaucus Nees; Aster laevigatus Hook.; Aster laevis var. abbreviatus Lunell; Aster laevis f. amplifolius (Porter) Fernald; Aster laevis var. amplifolius Porter; Aster laevis f. beckwithiae House; Aster laevis var. cyaneus (Hoffm.) Torr.; Aster laevis var. falcatus Farw.; Aster laevis f. falcatus (Farw.) F.Seym.; Aster laevis f. latifolius (Porter) Shinners; Aster laevis var. latifolius Porter; Aster laevis var. panduratus Farw.; Aster laevis f. purpurascens Farw.; Aster laevis var. simplex Cockerell; Aster laevis var. sourisensis Lunell; Aster laevis var. strictiflorus Osterh.; Aster laevis var. thyrsoideus Farw.; Aster laevis var. undulatifolius Lunell; Aster lucidus Loudon; Aster pensilvanicus Poir.; Aster pickettianus Suksd.; Aster politus Nees; Aster rubricaulis Lam.; Aster steeleorum Shinners; Diplactis cyanea Raf.

= Symphyotrichum laeve =

Species of flowering plant

Symphyotrichum laeve (formerly Aster laevis) is a flowering plant native to Canada, the United States, and Coahuila (Mexico). It has the common names of smooth blue aster, smooth aster, smooth-leaved aster, glaucous Michaelmas-daisy and glaucous aster.

== Description ==
Smooth aster is 20 to 70 centimeters (8 to 28 inches) tall. Its leaves are arranged alternately on the stems, and their shape varies among lanceolate, oblong-ovate, oblong-obovate, and ovate. They measure from 3 to 20 centimeters (1 to 8 inches) long and from 1 to 2.5 cm (3/8 to 1 in) wide. They are usually hairless, and the leaf edges are entire or bluntly or sharply toothed (crenate or serrate), sometimes with smaller teeth (serrulate).

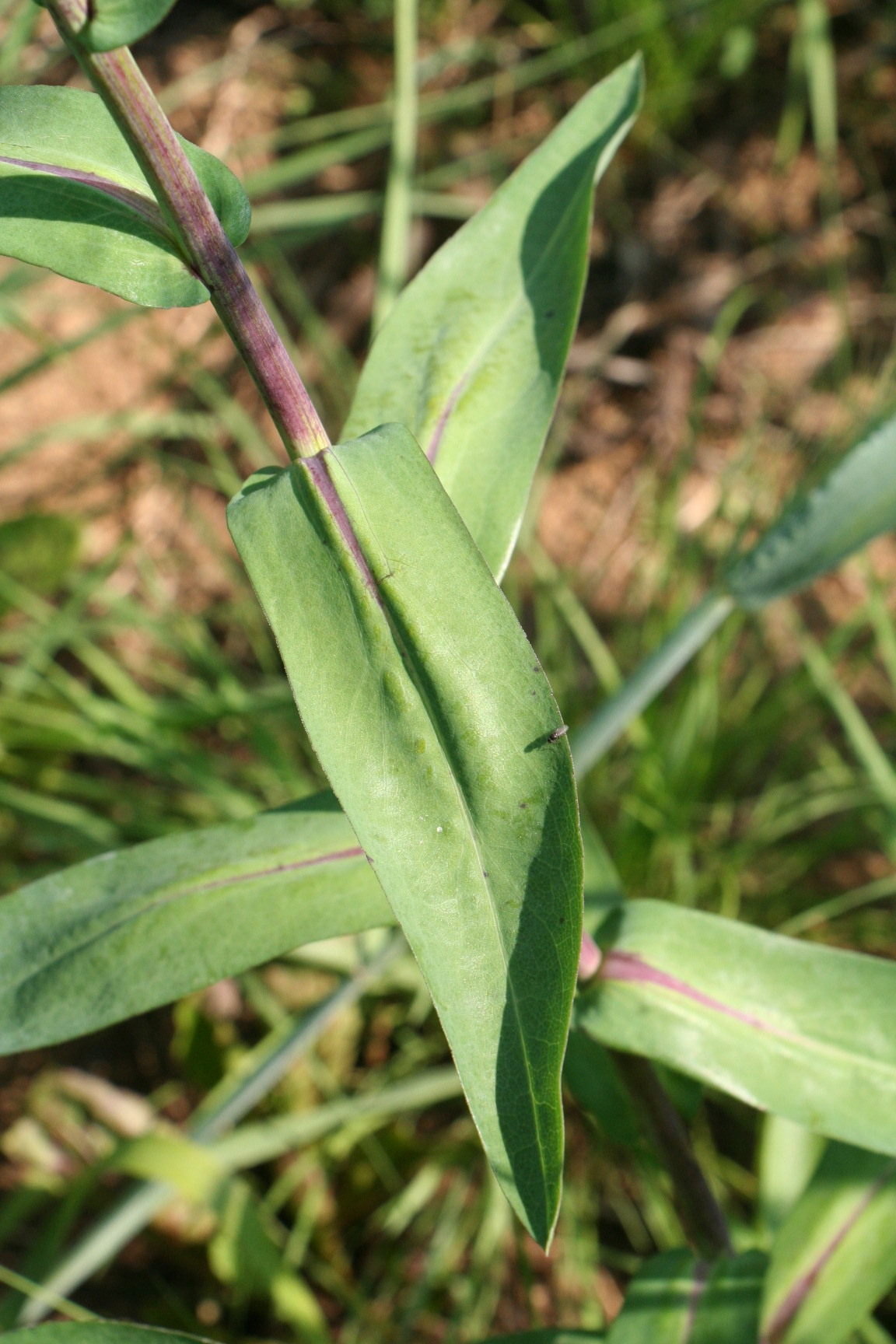

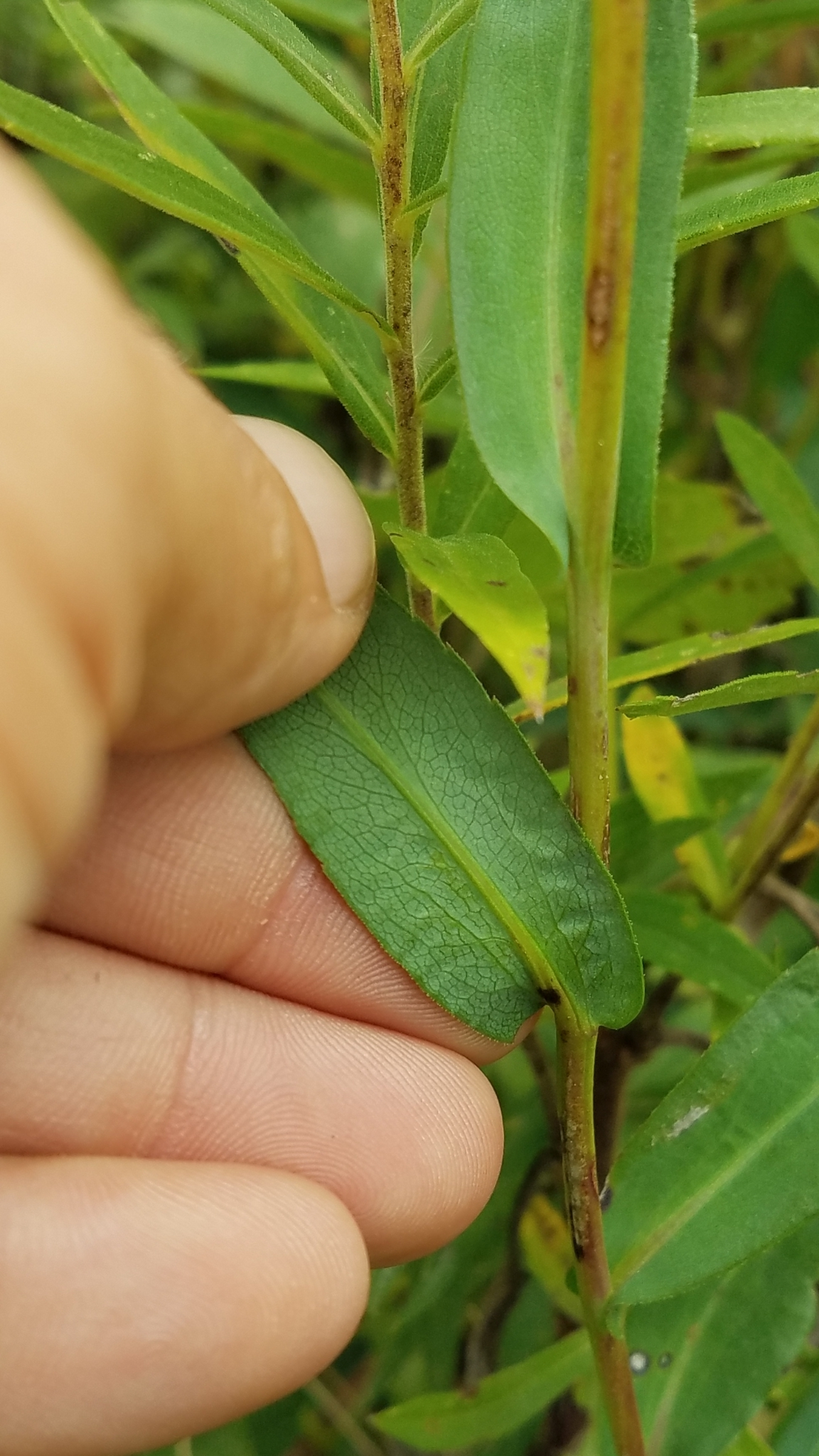

The flower heads are arranged in clusters (panicles). Each flower head has 13 to 23 ray florets with pale to dark blue or purple petals (laminae), and 19 to 33 disc florets that start out yellow and eventually turn purplish-red. The whole flowerhead measures 13 to 25 millimeters (1/2 to 1 in) across.

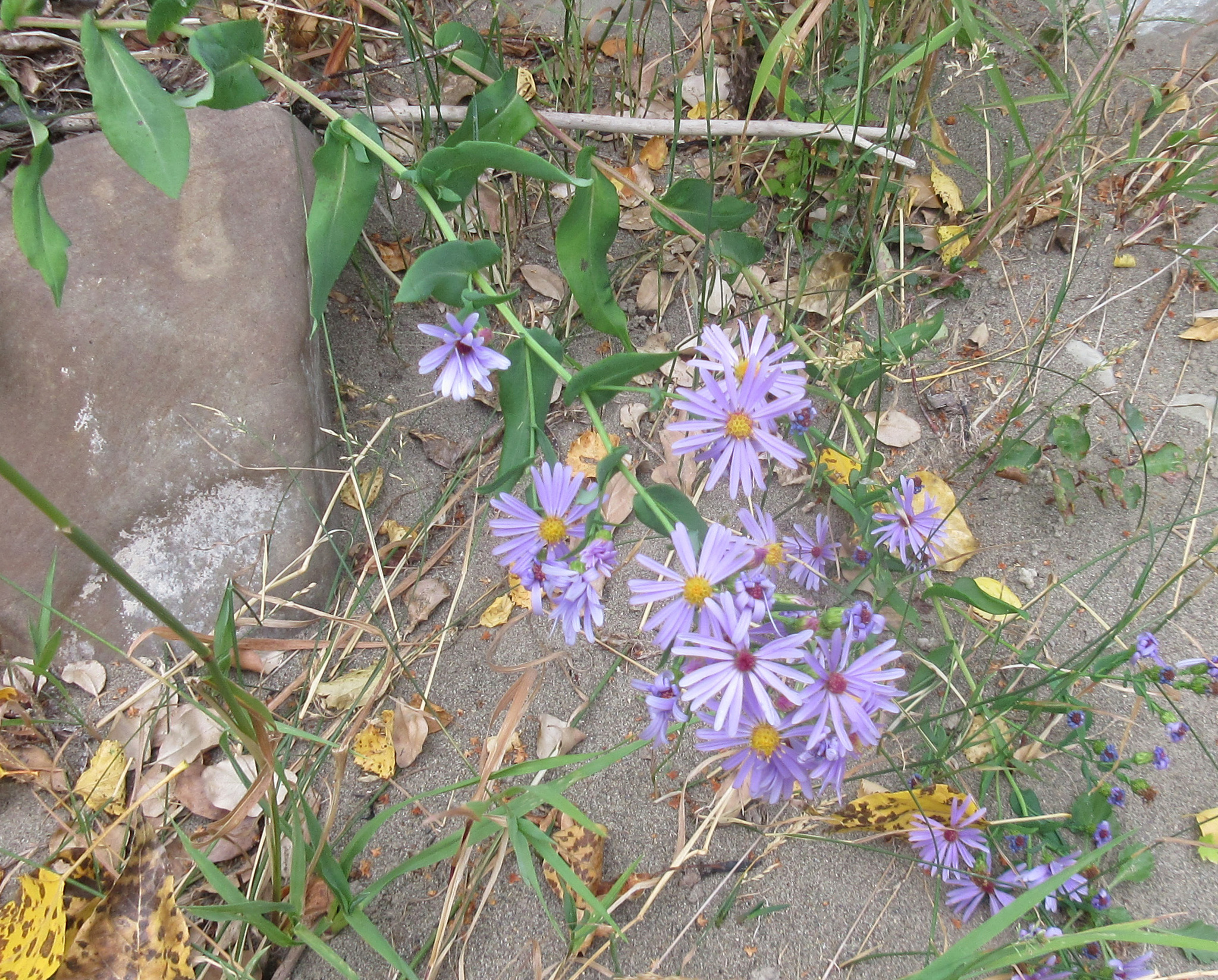

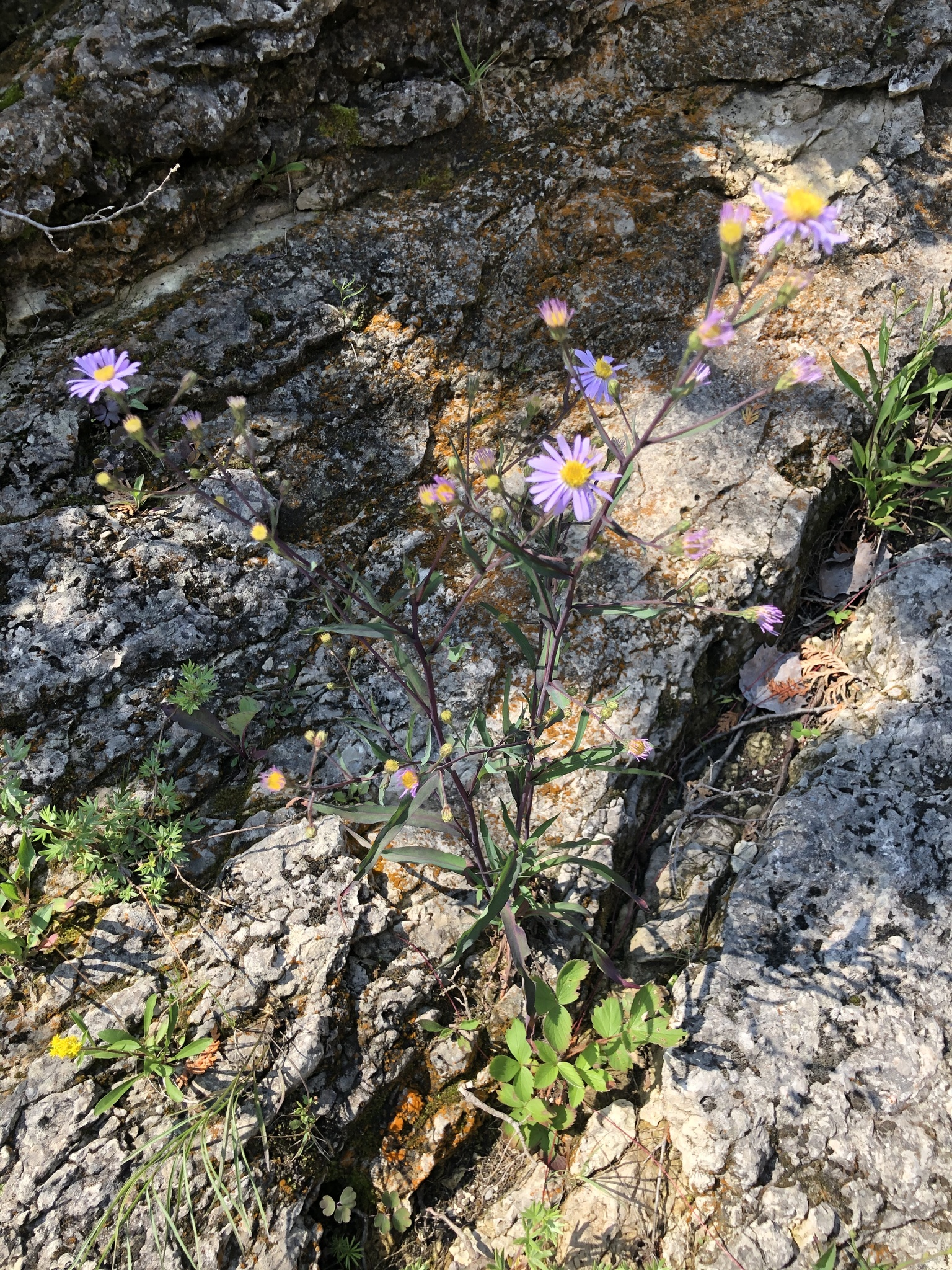

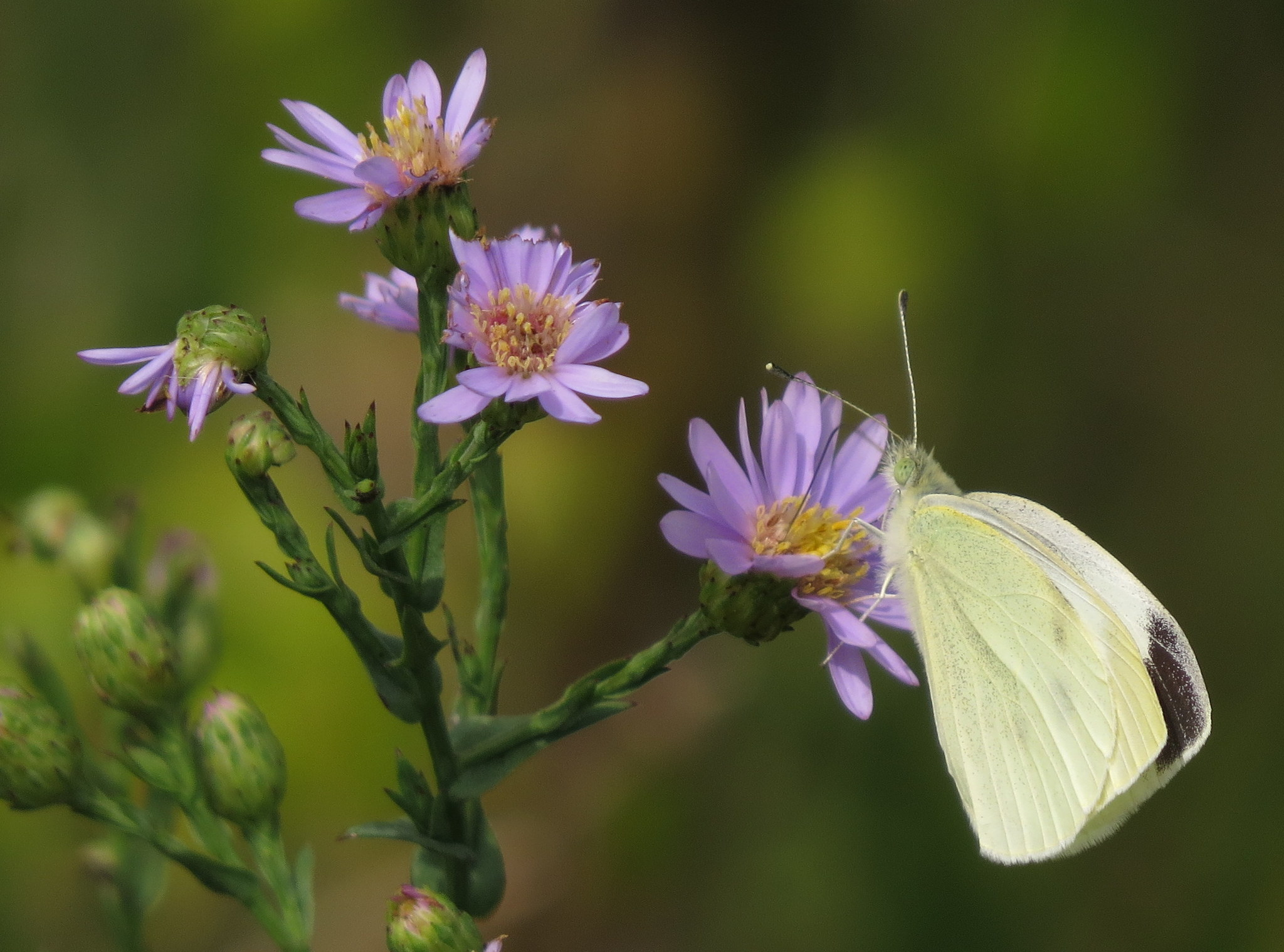

The seeds are cypselae with pappi (bristles at their tips). Like the hairs on dandelion seeds, the pappi allow the seeds to be spread by the wind.

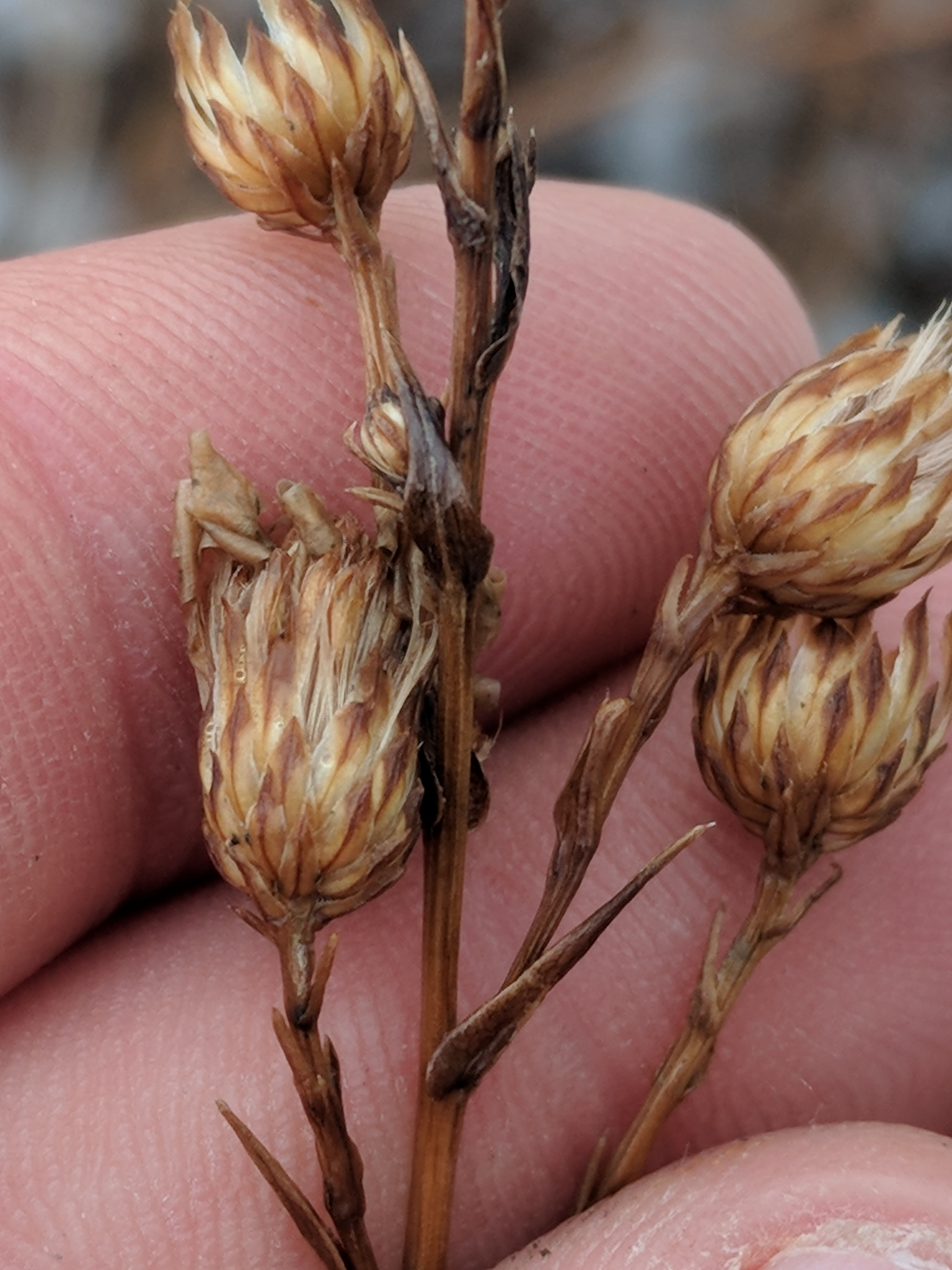

== Taxonomy ==
There are four varieties: Symphyotrichum laeve var. laeve, S. laeve var. geyeri (Geyer's aster), S. laeve var. concinnum, and S. laeve var. purpuratum.

Hybrids with this species and others of the genus have been reported, including three named as follows:

- Symphyotrichum × gravesii between S. laeve var. laeve and S. dumosum;
- Symphyotrichum × versicolor between S. laeve var. laeve and S. novi-belgii var. novi-belgii; and,
- Symphyotrichum × woldenii between S. laeve var. laeve and S. praealtum, which instead may be between S. oolentangiense and S. praealtum.
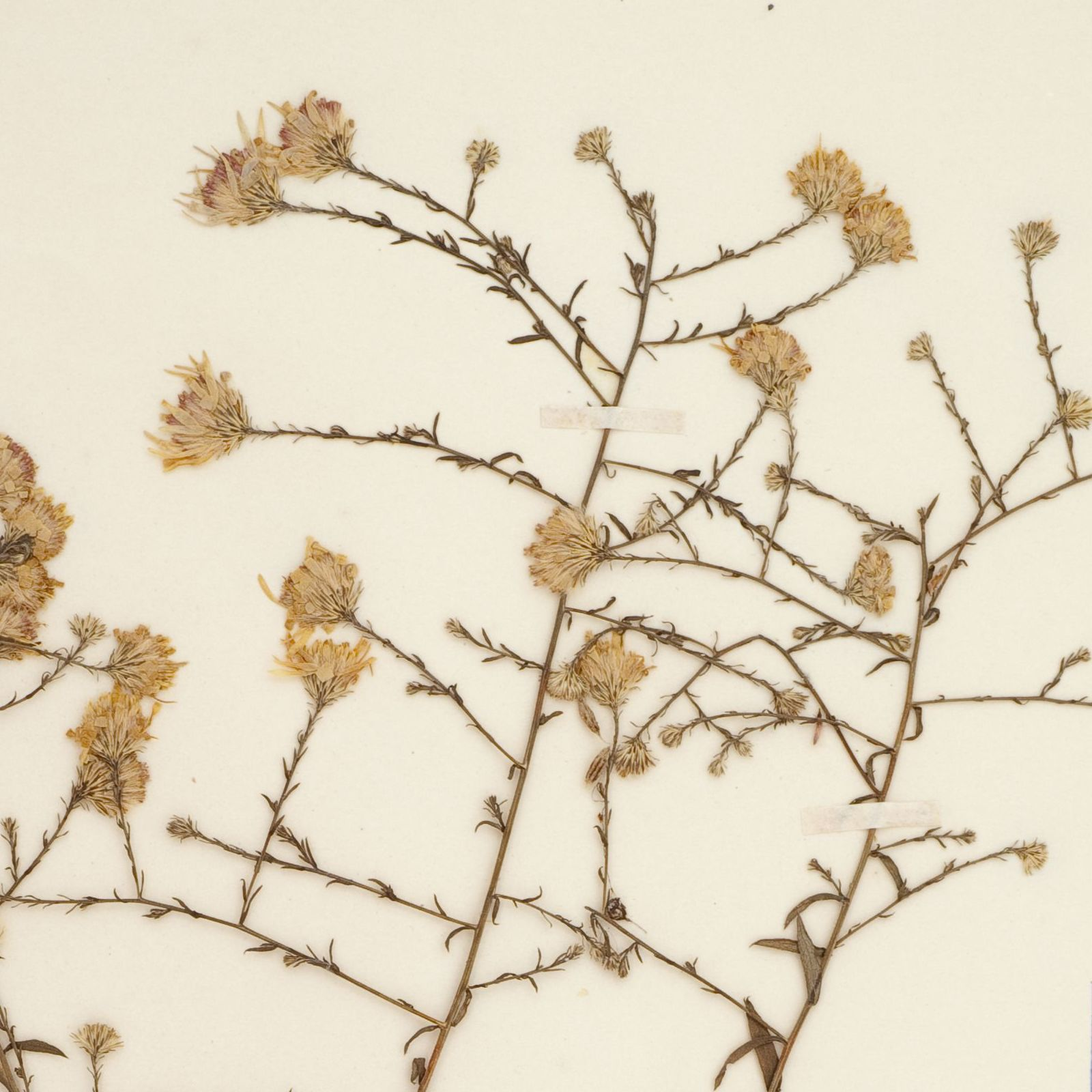
Symphyotrichum × gravesii

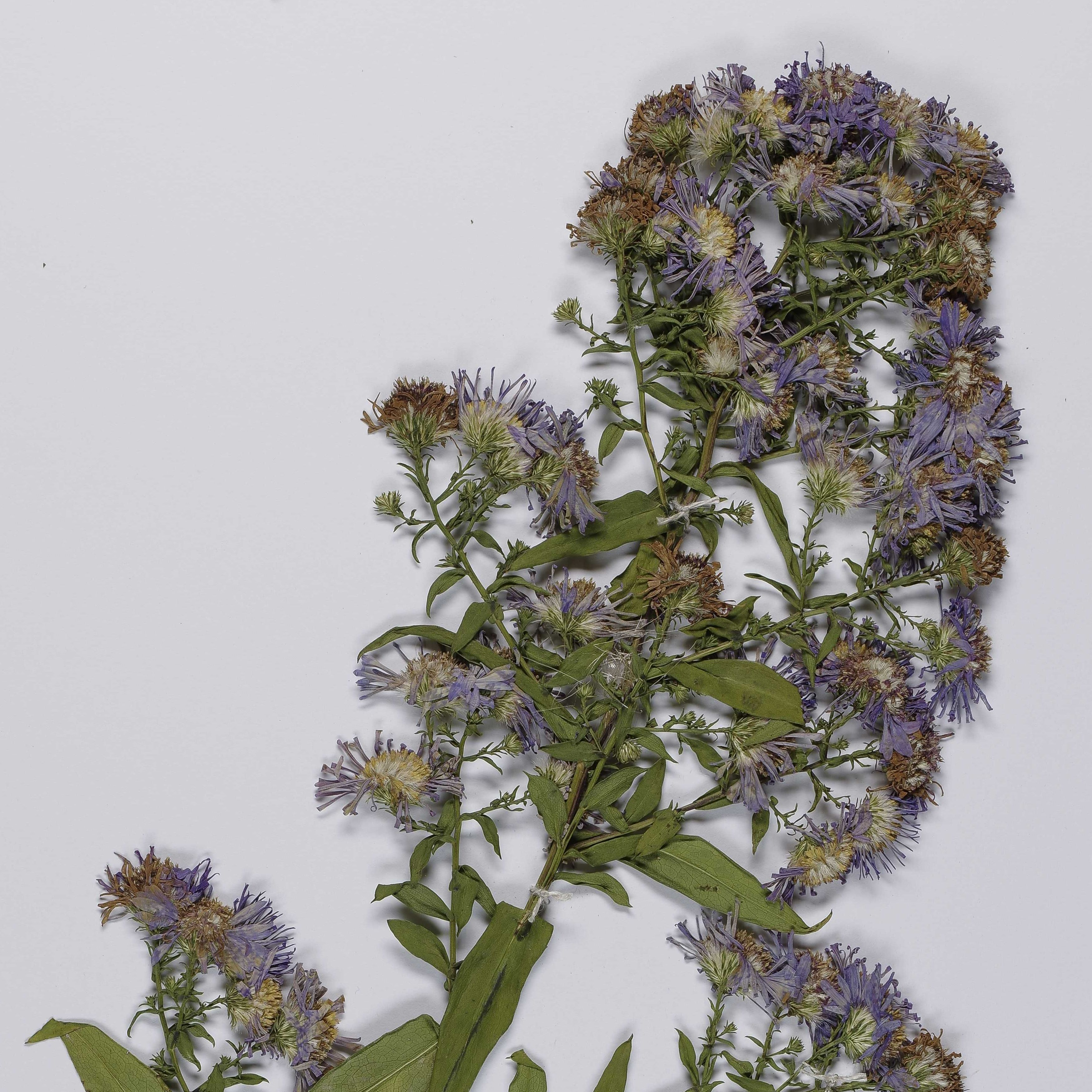
Symphyotrichum × versicolor

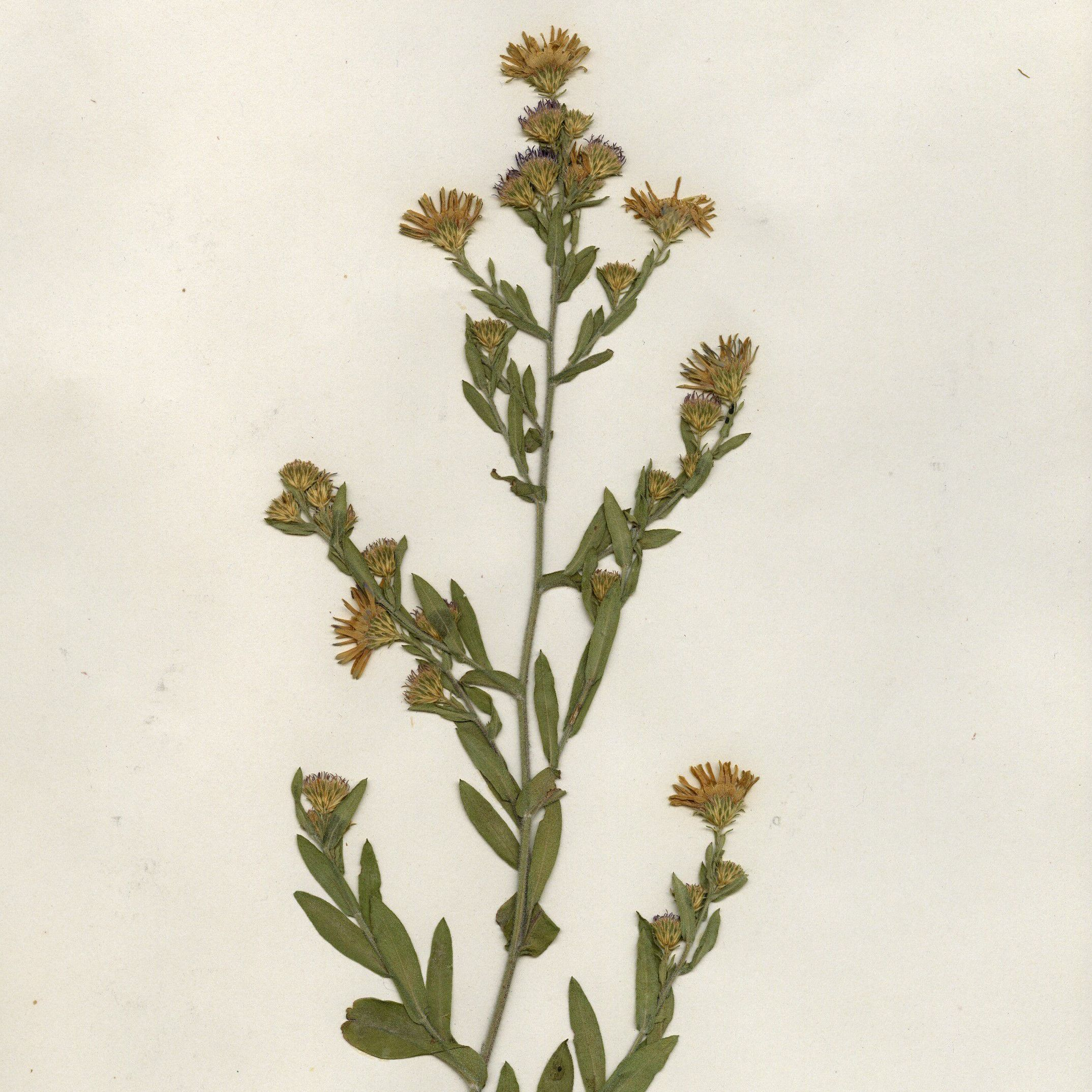
Symphyotrichum × woldenii
Species classifications
- - Symphyotrichum
    - subg. Chapmaniana
      S. chapmanii
    - subg. Astropolium
      - S. divaricatum
      - S. glabrifolium
      - S. graminifolium
      - S. martii
      - S. parviflorum
      - S. patagonicum
      - S. peteroanum
      - S. potosinum
      - S. regnellii
      - S. subulatum
      - S. tenuifolium
      - S. vahlii
    - subg. Virgulus
      - sect. Ericoidei
        - S. ericoides
        - S. falcatum
      - sect. Patentes
        - ssect. Brachyphylli
          - S. adnatum
          - S. walteri
        - ssect. Patentes
          - S. georgianum
          - S. patens
          - S. phlogifolium
      - sect. Grandiflori
        - ssect. Mexicanae
          - S. bimater
          - S. chihuahuense
          - S. hintonii
          - S. moranense
          - S. purpurascens
          - S. trilineatum
          - S. turneri
        - ssect. Grandiflori
          - S. campestre
          - S. estesii
          - S. fendleri
          - S. fontinale
          - S. grandiflorum
          - S. oblongifolium
          - S. pygmaeum
          - S. yukonense
      - sect. Polyliguli
        S. novae-angliae
      - sect. Concolores
        - S. concolor
        - S. lucayanum
        - S. plumosum
        - S. pratense
        - S. sericeum
    - subg. Ascendentes (Note: Sugbenus Ascendentes is made up of two allopolyploid species with historic parents from subg. Virgulus and subg. Symphyotrichum.)
      - S. ascendens
      - S. defoliatum
    - subg. Symphyotrichum
      - sect. Conyzopsis
        - S. ciliatum
        - S. frondosum
        - S. laurentianum
      - sect. Occidentales
        - S. chilense
        - S. eatonii
        - S. foliaceum
        - S. greatae
        - S. hallii
        - S. hendersonii
        - S. jessicae
        - S. lentum
        - S. molle
        - S. spathulatum
        - S. subspicatum
      - sect. Turbinelli
        S. turbinellum
      - sect. Symphyotrichum
        - ssect. Dumosi
          - S. boreale
          - S. bullatum
          - S. burgessii
          - S. carnerosanum
          - S. dumosum
          - S. eulae
          - S. lanceolatum
          - S. lateriflorum
          - S. leone
          - S. nahanniense
          - S. ontarionis
          - S. praealtum
          - S. racemosum
          - S. schaffneri
          - S. simmondsii
          - S. tradescantii
          - S. welshii
        - ssect. Heterophylli
          - ser. Concinni
            - S. laeve
            - S. oolentangiense
          - ser. Cordifolii
            - S. anomalum
            - S. ciliolatum
            - S. cordifolium
            - S. drummondii
            - S. shortii
            - S. undulatum
            - S. urophyllum
        - ssect. Porteriani
          - S. depauperatum
          - S. kentuckiense
          - S. parviceps
          - S. pilosum
          - S. porteri
        - ssect. Symphyotrichum
          - ser. Punicei
            - S. elliottii
            - S. firmum
            - S. prenanthoides
            - S. puniceum
            - S. rhiannon
          - ser. Symphyotrichum
            - S. anticostense
            - S. novi-belgii
            - S. retroflexum
            - S. robynsianum
  Cladogram references

== Distribution and habitat ==
Symphyotrichum laeve varieties are native to Canada, the United States, and Coahuila (Mexico). The species is introduced in Québec and New Brunswick.

Symphyotrichum laeve grows in fields, open woods, and along roadsides in rocky or dry soil and full sun.

== Ecology ==
Symphyotrichum laeve blooms in late summer and early fall. It is pollinated by many native bees and attracts butterflies. It is a larval host for the pearl crescent butterfly (Phyciodes tharos).
