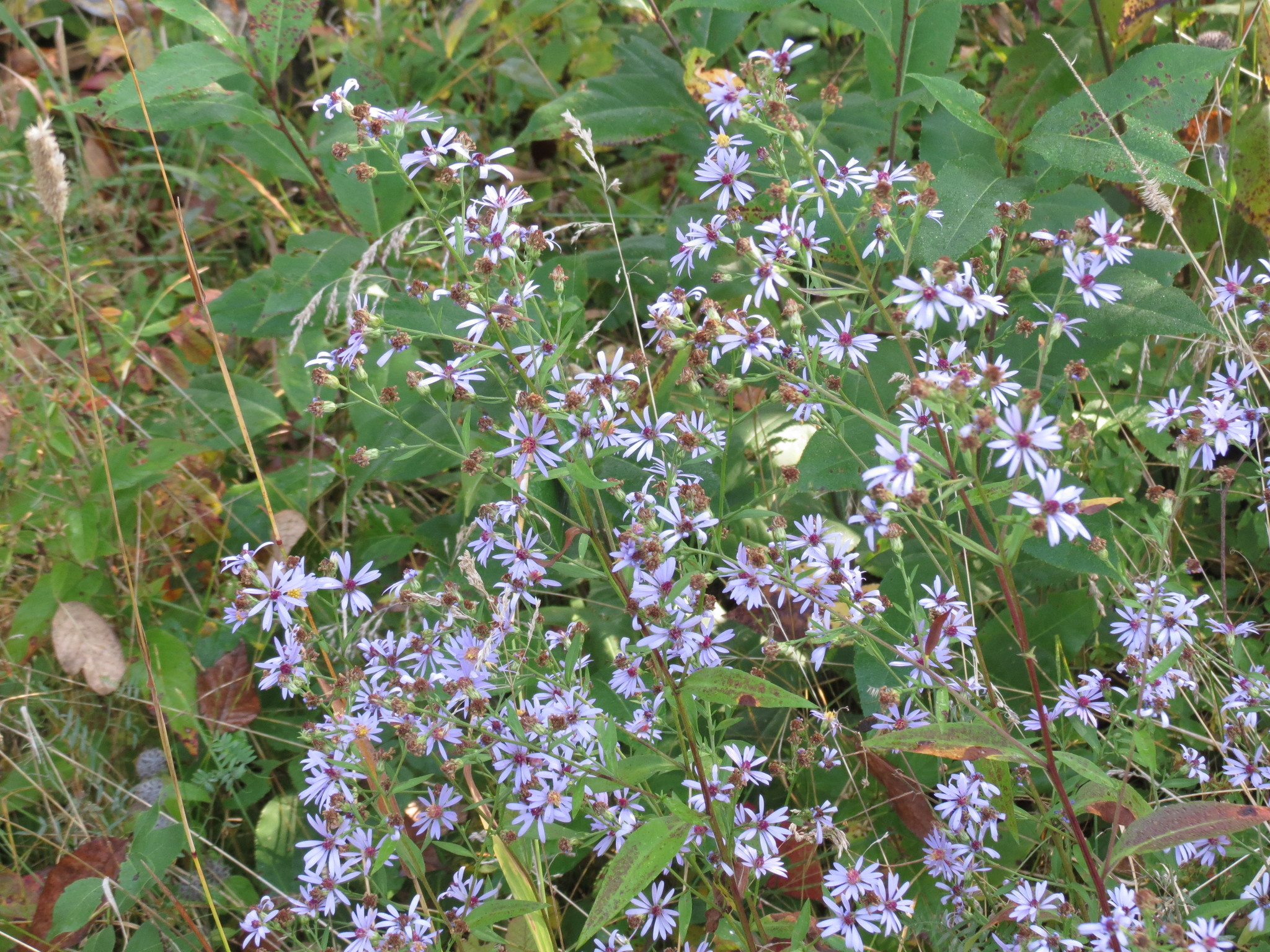
- In Ontario, Canada

Conservation status
- Secure (NatureServe)

Scientific classification
- Kingdom: Plantae
- Clade: Tracheophytes
- Clade: Angiosperms
- Clade: Eudicots
- Clade: Asterids
- Order: Asterales
- Family: Asteraceae
- Tribe: Astereae
- Subtribe: Symphyotrichinae
- Genus: Symphyotrichum
- Subgenus: Symphyotrichum subg. Symphyotrichum
- Section: Symphyotrichum sect. Symphyotrichum
- Species: S. ciliolatum

Binomial name
- Symphyotrichum ciliolatum (Lindl.) Á.Löve & D.Löve
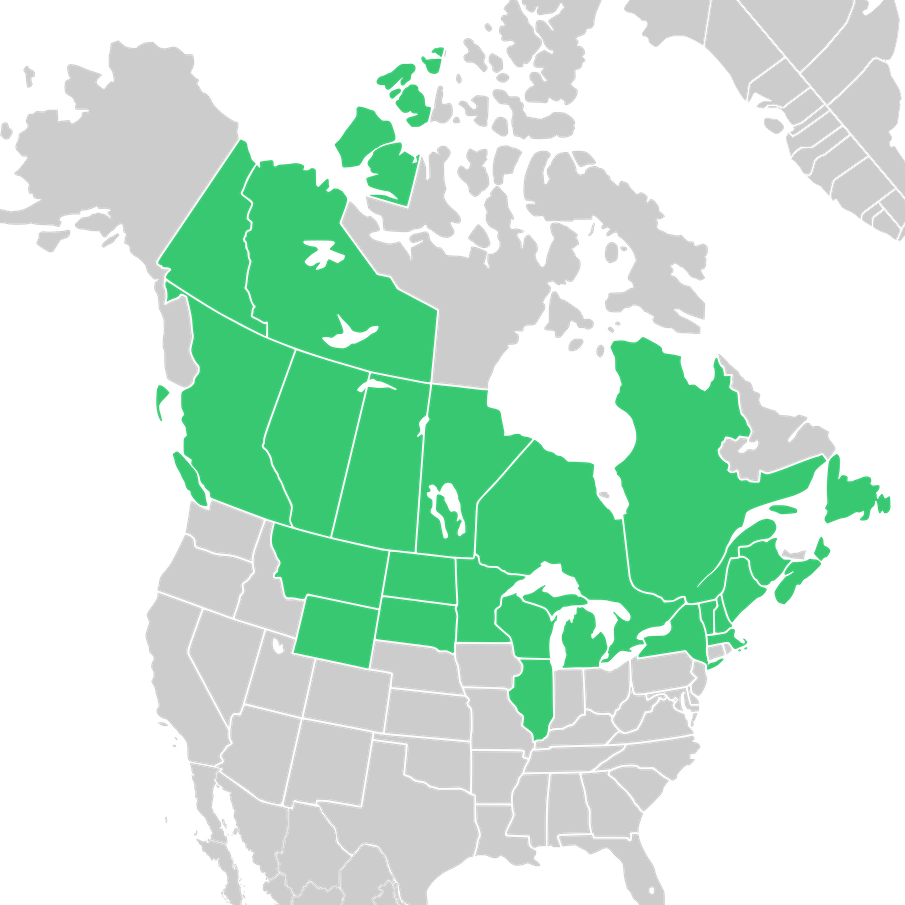
- Native distribution

Synonyms
- Basionym: Aster ciliolatus Lindl.; Alphabetical list: Aster ciliolatus var. borealis (J.Rousseau) Dutilly & Lepage; Aster ciliolatus f. comatus Fernald; Aster ciliolatus var. comatus (Fernald) A.G.Jones; Aster ciliolatus var. wilsonii (Rydb.) A.G.Jones; Aster lindleyanus Torr. & A.Gray; Aster lindleyanus var. borealis J.Rousseau; Aster lindleyanus var. ciliolatus (Lindl.) A.Gray; Aster lindleyanus var. comatus Fernald; Aster lindleyanus var. eximius E.S.Burgess; Aster praecox Lindl.; Aster saundersii E.S.Burgess; Aster wilsonii Rydb.; Symphyotrichum ciliolatum var. comatum (Fernald) G.L.Nesom; Symphyotrichum ciliolatum var. wilsonii (Rydb.) G.L.Nesom

= Symphyotrichum ciliolatum =

Species of plant in the aster family

Symphyotrichum ciliolatum (formerly Aster ciliolatus), commonly known as Lindley's aster and fringed blue aster, is a perennial herb native to Canada and the northern United States. It is also known as ciliolate wood aster and northern heart-leaved aster. The common name Lindley's aster honours John Lindley who first described the species in 1834.

== Description ==
Symphyotrichum ciliolatum can reach heights of up to 1.2 metres (3 feet 11 inches) and can spread via long rhizomes. The leaves are typically heart-shaped with winged petioles. Flowering occurs between late July and October. The ray florets are blue or bluish purple, and the disc florets are yellow, becoming reddish purple with maturity.

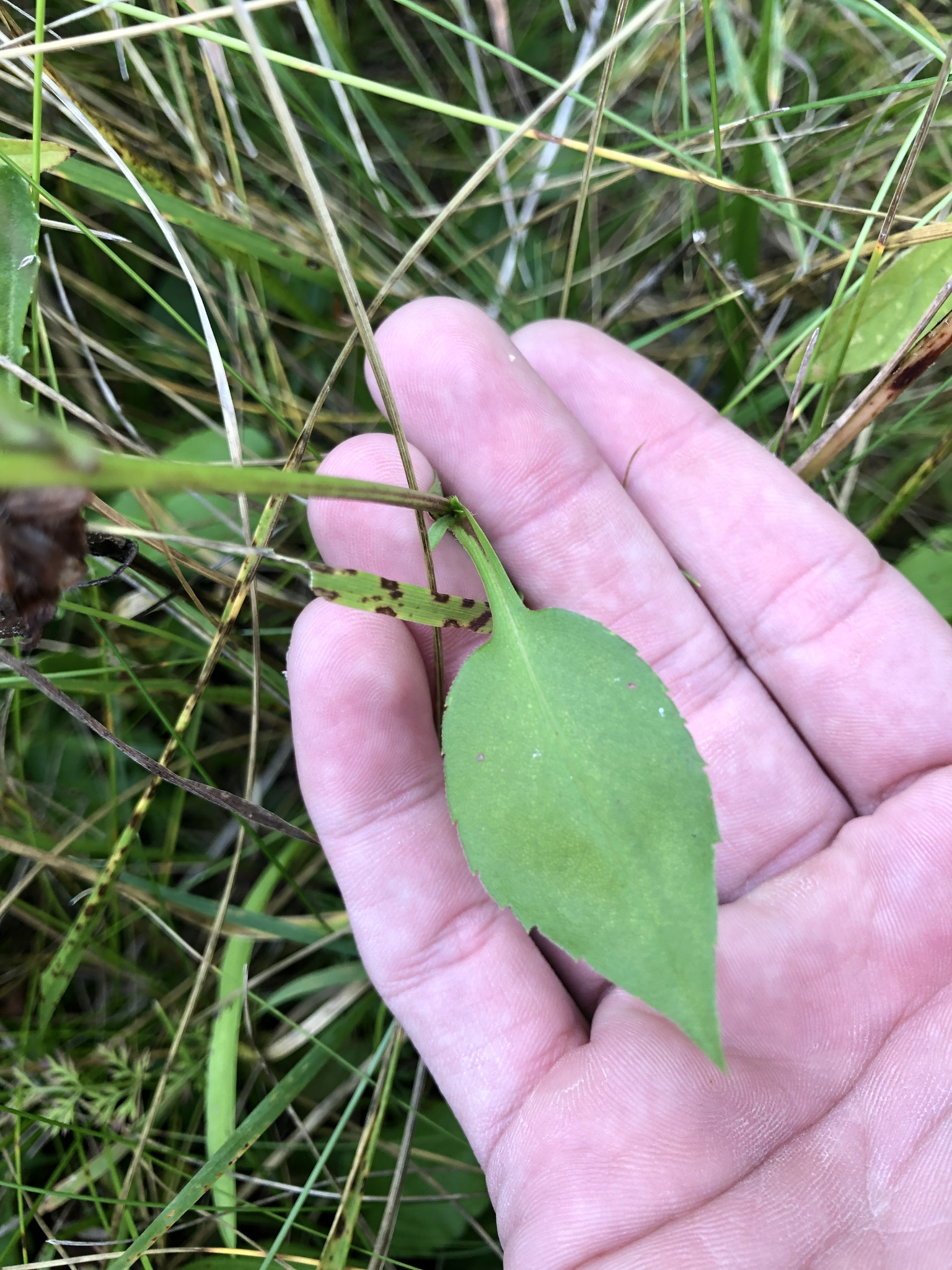
Leaf of S. ciliolatum

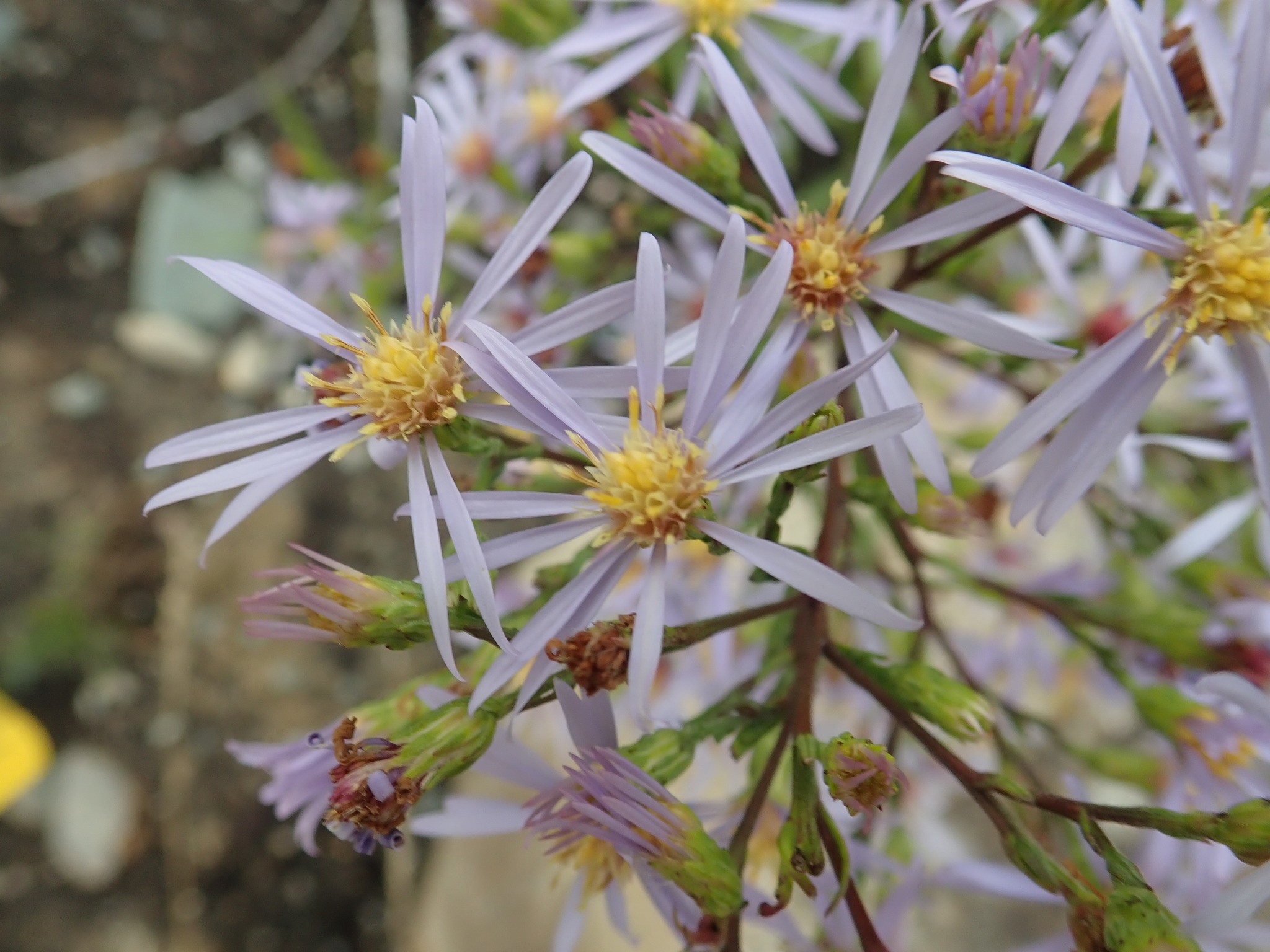
Flowering in Ontario, Canada

== Taxonomy ==
Hybrids with Symphyotrichum laeve, Symphyotrichum novi-belgii (named Symphyotrichum x subgeminatum), and possibly Symphyotrichum lanceolatum have been recorded.

== Distribution and habitat ==
Symphyotrichum ciliolatum grows in open forests, forest edges, thickets and along streams, trails, and roadsides. It occurs across Canada from Yukon to Newfoundland, and in the northern United States from Montana to New York.
