= Coleophora laurentella =

Scientific classification
- Kingdom: Animalia
- Phylum: Arthropoda
- Class: Insecta
- Order: Lepidoptera
- Family: Coleophoridae
- Genus: Coleophora
- Species: C. laurentella

Binomial name
- Coleophora laurentella McDunnough, 1944

Species of moth

Coleophora laurentella is a moth of the family Coleophoridae. It is found in North America, including Maine, New Brunswick and Nova Scotia.

The larvae feed on the leaves of genus Aster sensu lato (broadly), including Symphyotrichum novi-belgii. They create an annulate case.
