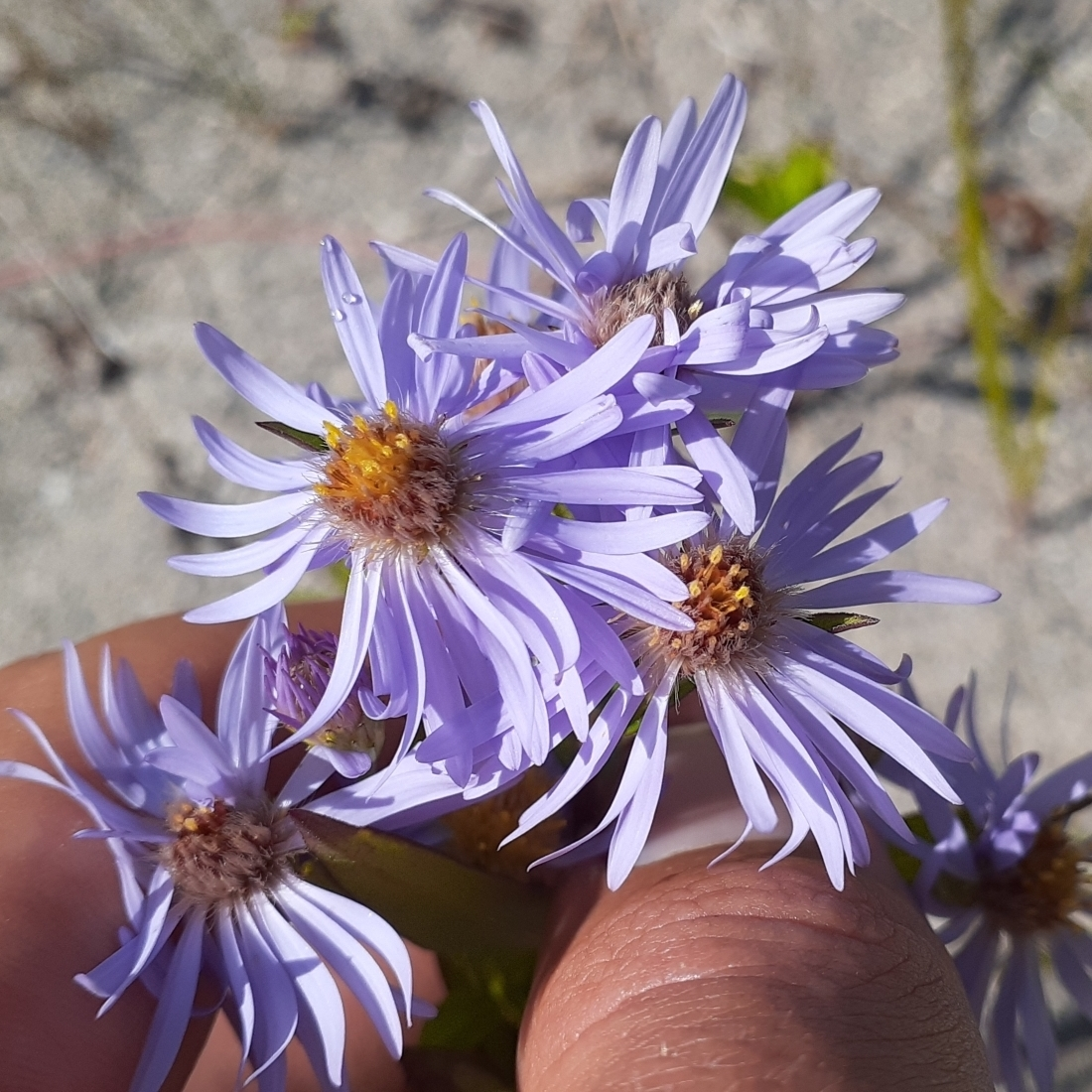

Conservation status
- Secure (NatureServe)

Scientific classification
- Kingdom: Plantae
- Clade: Tracheophytes
- Clade: Angiosperms
- Clade: Eudicots
- Clade: Asterids
- Order: Asterales
- Family: Asteraceae
- Tribe: Astereae
- Subtribe: Symphyotrichinae
- Genus: Symphyotrichum
- Subgenus: Symphyotrichum subg. Symphyotrichum
- Section: Symphyotrichum sect. Symphyotrichum
- Species: S. robynsianum

Binomial name
- Symphyotrichum robynsianum (J.Rousseau) Brouillet & Labrecque
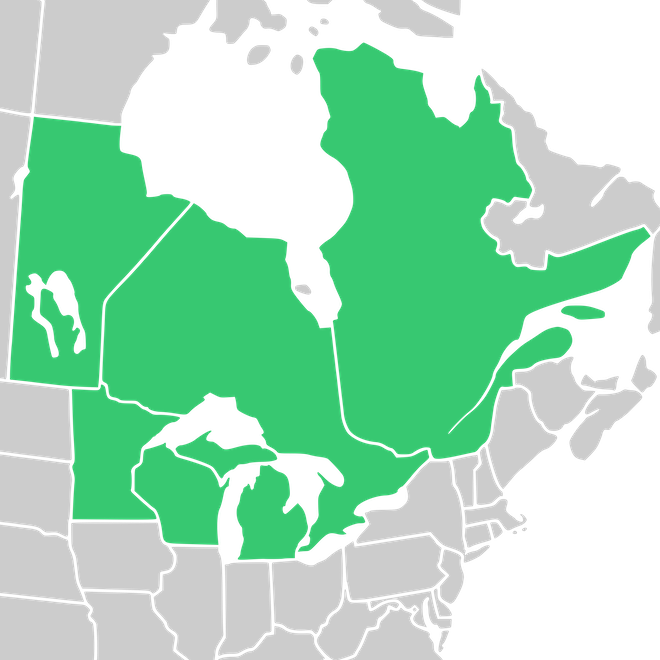
- Native distribution by state and province

Synonyms
- Aster robynsianus J.Rousseau

= Symphyotrichum robynsianum =

Species of plant in the aster family

Symphyotrichum robynsianum (formerly Aster robynsianum) is a species of flowering plant in the family Asteraceae native to northeastern North America. Common names include Robyns's aster, longleaf aster, and long-leaved aster.

== Description ==
S. robynsianum is a perennial, herbaceous plant with long rhizomes and erect stems ranging from 10 to 80 centimetres (4 to 31 inches) tall. The stiff narrow leaves are slightly toothed or entire. Flowers may be produced from August to September. The flower heads are located singly or in groups of up to three on leafy branches. The ray florets are dark blue-violet and the disc florets are yellow.

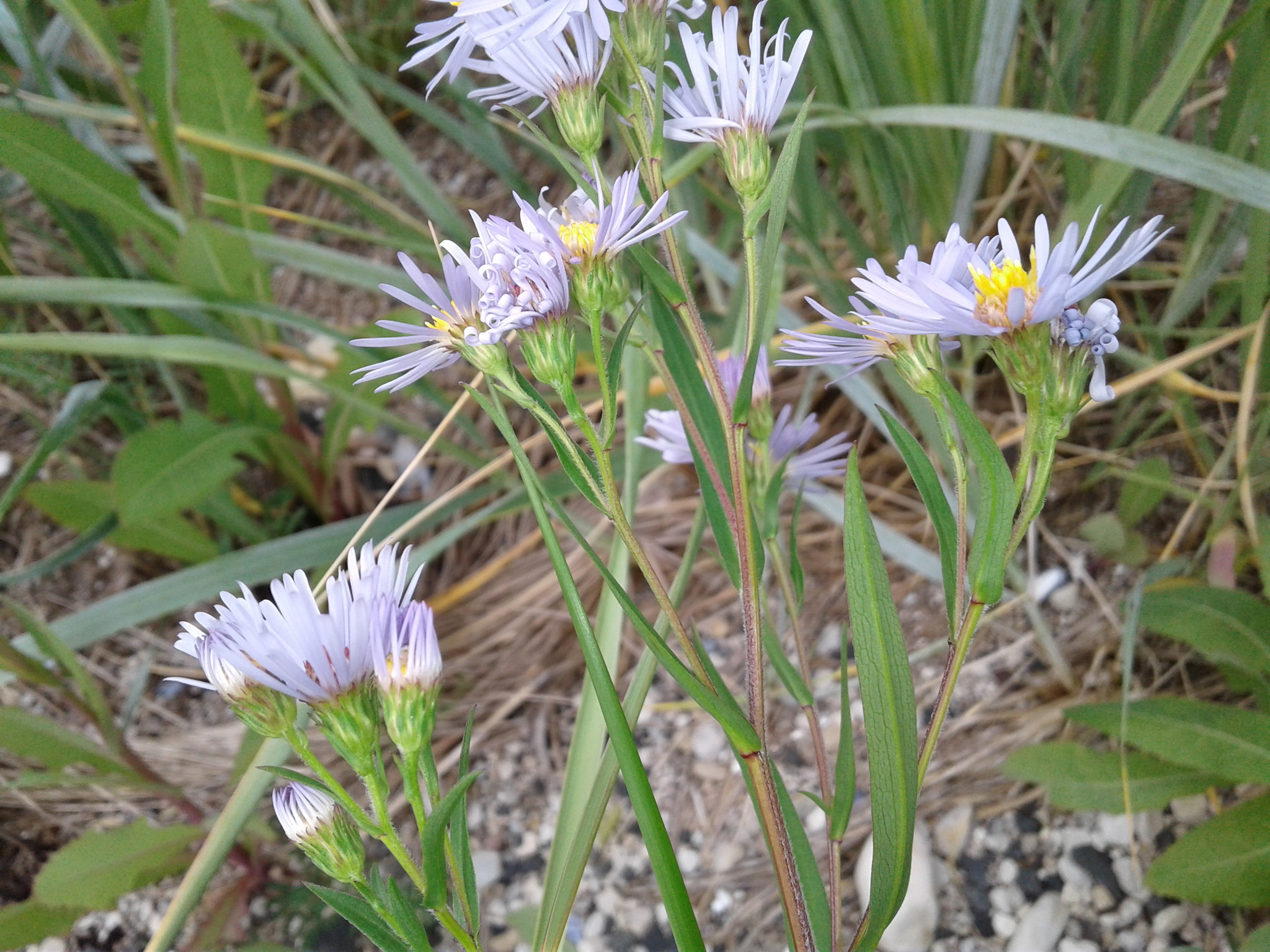
Flower heads showing involucres and phyllaries

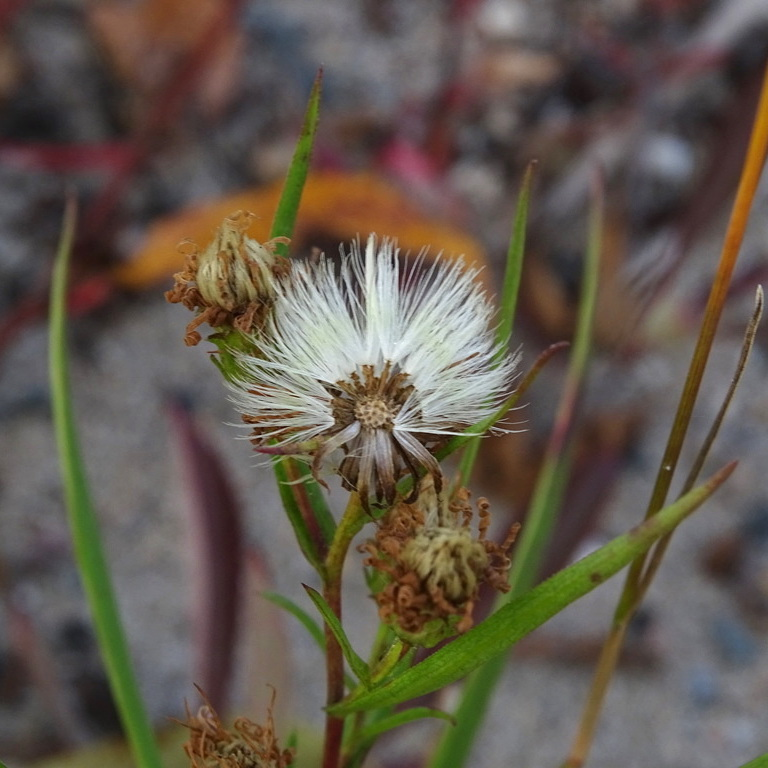
Fruiting plant

== Taxonomy ==
Symphyotrichum robynsianum was formerly included in the large genus Aster as Aster robynsianum. However, this broad circumscription of Aster is polyphyletic and the North American asters are now mostly classified in Symphyotrichum and several other genera. No subspecies or varieties have been recognized within Symphyotrichum robynsianum.

This species has often gone by the name Aster longifolius, but the type specimen for that name is a specimen of Symphyotrichum novi-belgii, and as such that name cannot be used for the plants now called S. robynsianum. In 1957, Jacques Rousseau, a Quebecois ethnobotanist, described Aster robynsianum based on a specimen from central Quebec, naming it after Walter Robyns, a director of the National Botanic Garden of Belgium. The name Symphyotrichum robynsianum was first used in 1997 by Luc Brouillet and Jacques Labrecque.

Symphyotrichum robynsianum may have originated as hybrid between two other aster species, but its origin is not well understood.

== Distribution and habitat ==
Symphyotrichum robynsianum is native to parts of Manitoba, Ontario, Quebec, Michigan, Minnesota and Wisconsin. It is typical of moist, open, sandy, gravelly or rocky habitats such as river and lake shores, and alvars. It is usually associated with calcareous habitats.

== Conservation ==
As of August 2023, NatureServe listed S. robynsianum as Secure (G5) globally, last reviewed on 13 July 2016. On a US state and Canadian province basis, it listed the species as Vulnerable (S3) in Quebec; Critically Imperiled (S1) in Manitoba and Wisconsin; and, Secure (S5) in Ontario. Michigan and Minnesota have not been ranked.
