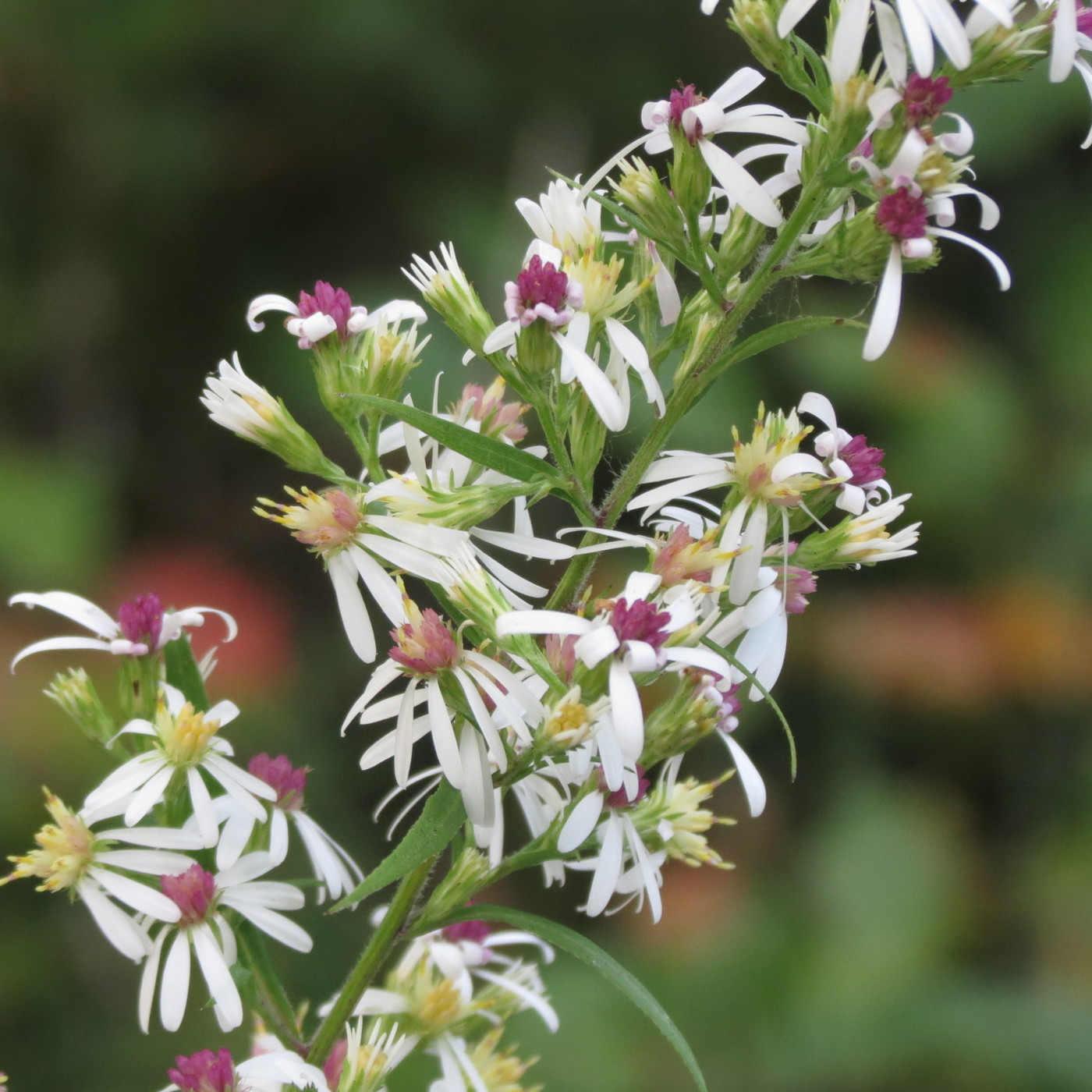

Conservation status
- Apparently Secure (NatureServe)

Scientific classification
- Kingdom: Plantae
- Clade: Tracheophytes
- Clade: Angiosperms
- Clade: Eudicots
- Clade: Asterids
- Order: Asterales
- Family: Asteraceae
- Tribe: Astereae
- Subtribe: Symphyotrichinae
- Genus: Symphyotrichum
- Subgenus: Symphyotrichum subg. Symphyotrichum
- Section: Symphyotrichum sect. Symphyotrichum
- Species: S. urophyllum

Binomial name
- Symphyotrichum urophyllum (Lindl.) G.L. Nesom
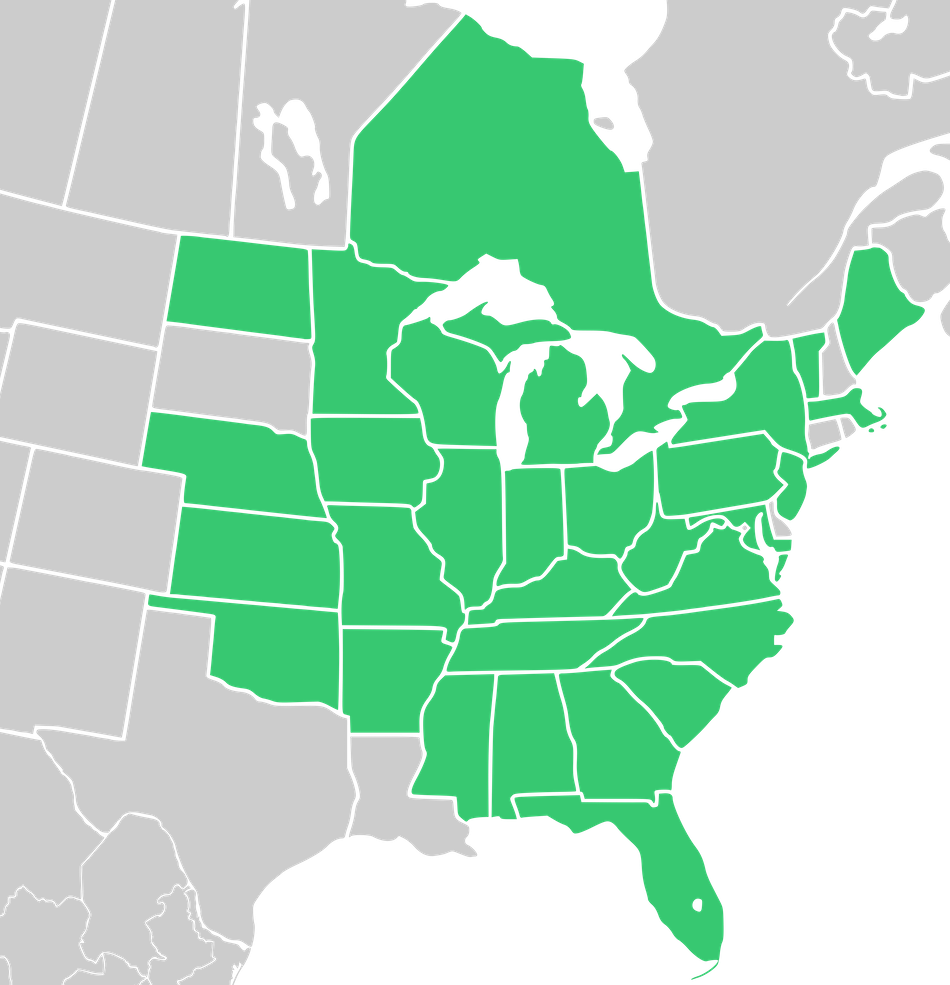
- Native distribution

Synonyms
- Basionym: Aster urophyllus Lindl.; Alphabetical list: Aster hirtellus Lindl. ex DC.; Aster sagittifolius var. dissitiflorus E.S.Burgess; Aster sagittifolius var. glomerellus Farw.; Aster sagittifolius f. hirtellus (Lindl. ex DC.) Shinners; Aster sagittifolius var. urophyllus (Lindl. ex DC.) Burgess; Aster urophyllus var. glomerellus Farw.

= Symphyotrichum urophyllum =

Species of plant in the aster family

Symphyotrichum urophyllum (formerly Aster urophyllus) is a species of flowering plant in the family Asteraceae native to eastern North America, with the common name of arrowleaf aster.

== Description ==
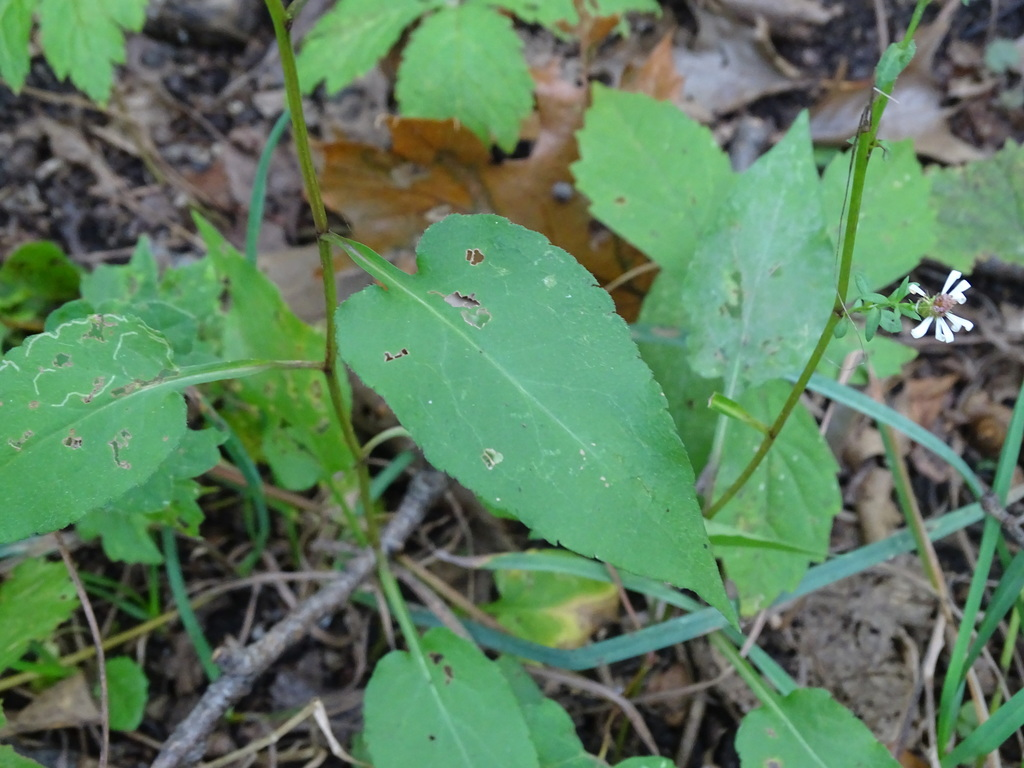
Leaf of S. urophyllum, Ontario, Canada

Symphyotrichum urophyllum is a perennial, herbaceous species between 40 and 120 centimeters (1 1/4 and 4 feet) tall. Plants are cespitose, with 1–5 erect stems emerging from the same point. The broad, thin, toothed leaves are arrow-shaped, with a broadly winged petiole. The dense, pyramidal inflorescence of composite flowers is distinctive. The ray florets are white and the disc florets are white to cream becoming pink.

== Taxonomy ==
Symphyotrichum urophyllum was formerly included in the large genus Aster as Aster urophyllus. However, this broad circumscription of Aster is polyphyletic and the North American asters are now mostly classified in Symphyotrichum and several other genera.

The taxonomic status of this species has been unstable, and it has been treated as Symphyotrichum sagittifolium, a name now considered to be synonymous with Symphyotrichum cordifolium. Most sources now use S. urophyllum to refer to this species.

== Distribution and habitat ==
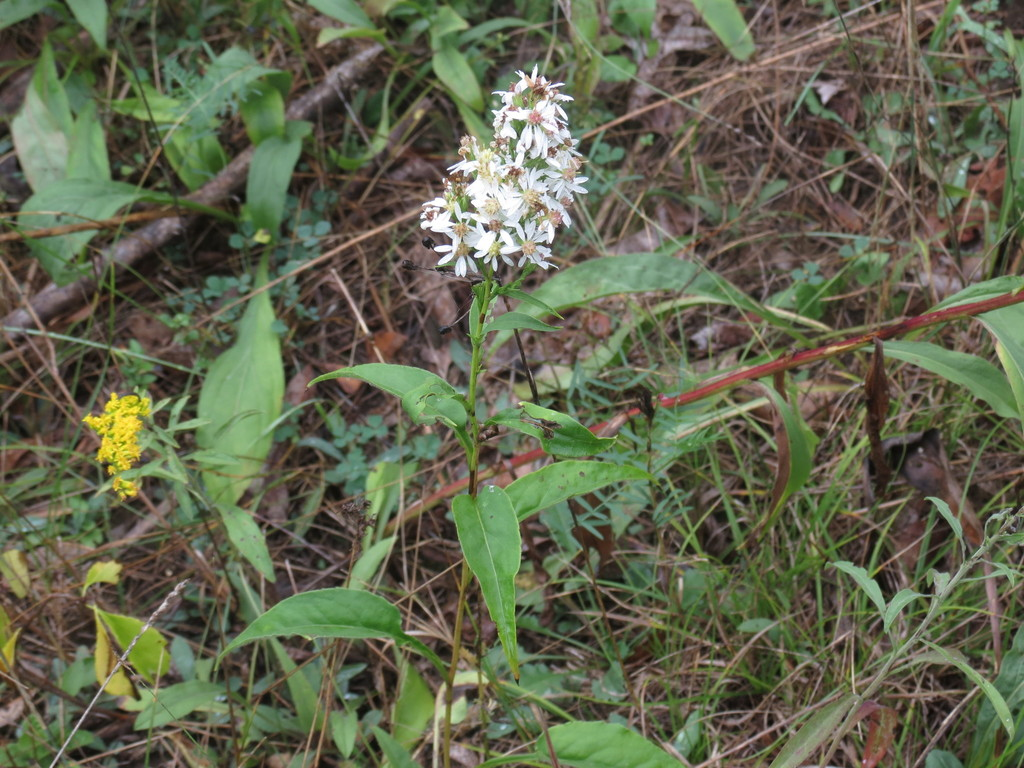
S. urophyllum, Ontario, Canada, showing pyramidal inflorescence

Symphyotrichum urophyllum is native to the United States from Maine to Florida and west to Nebraska, as well as Ontario, Canada. It is found in open, dry to mesic habitats such as meadows, open woodlands, bluffs, forest edges, and roadsides.
