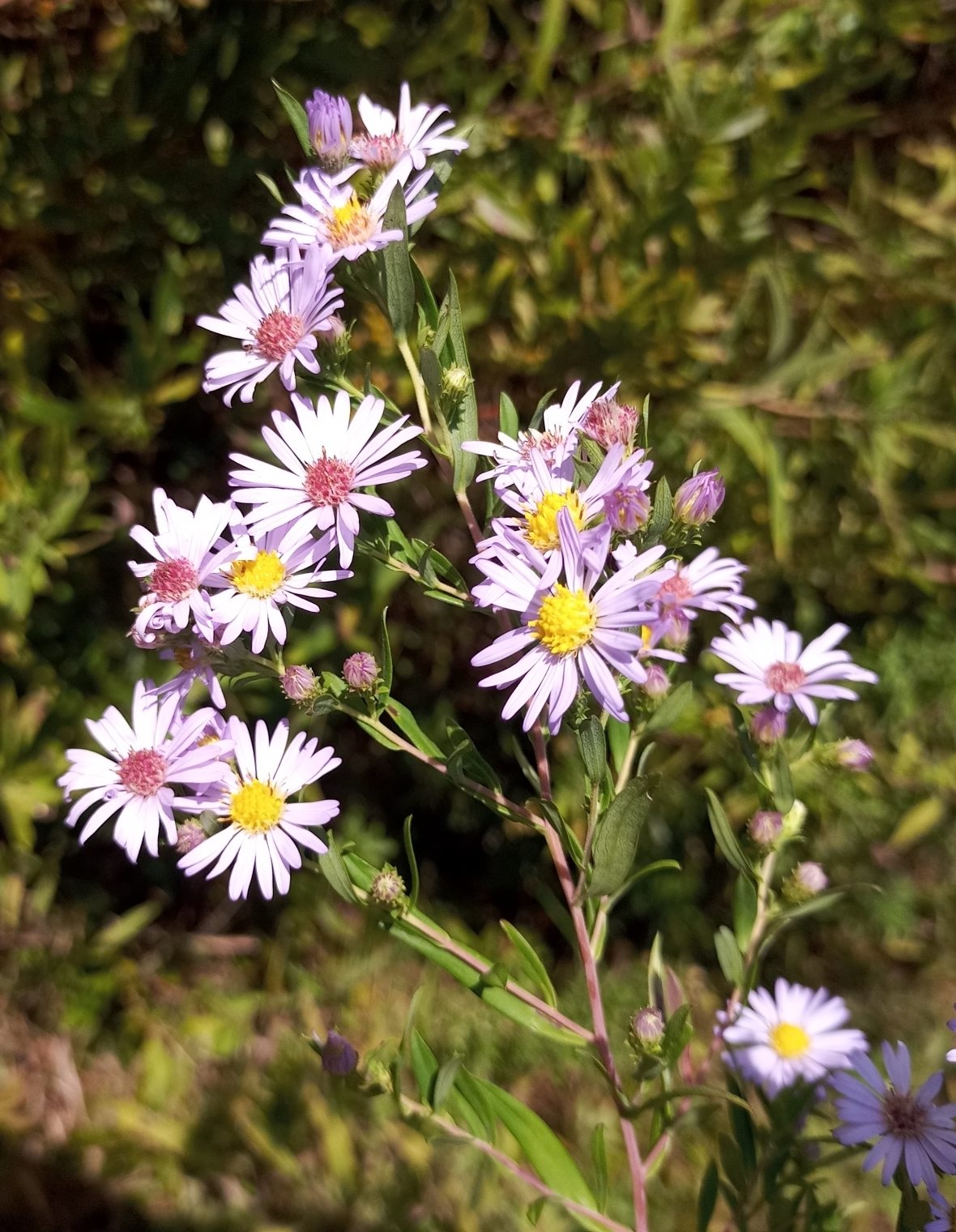

Conservation status
- Secure (NatureServe)

Scientific classification
- Kingdom: Plantae
- Clade: Tracheophytes
- Clade: Angiosperms
- Clade: Eudicots
- Clade: Asterids
- Order: Asterales
- Family: Asteraceae
- Tribe: Astereae
- Subtribe: Symphyotrichinae
- Genus: Symphyotrichum
- Subgenus: Symphyotrichum subg. Symphyotrichum
- Section: Symphyotrichum sect. Symphyotrichum
- Species: S. praealtum

Binomial name
- Symphyotrichum praealtum (Poir.) G.L.Nesom
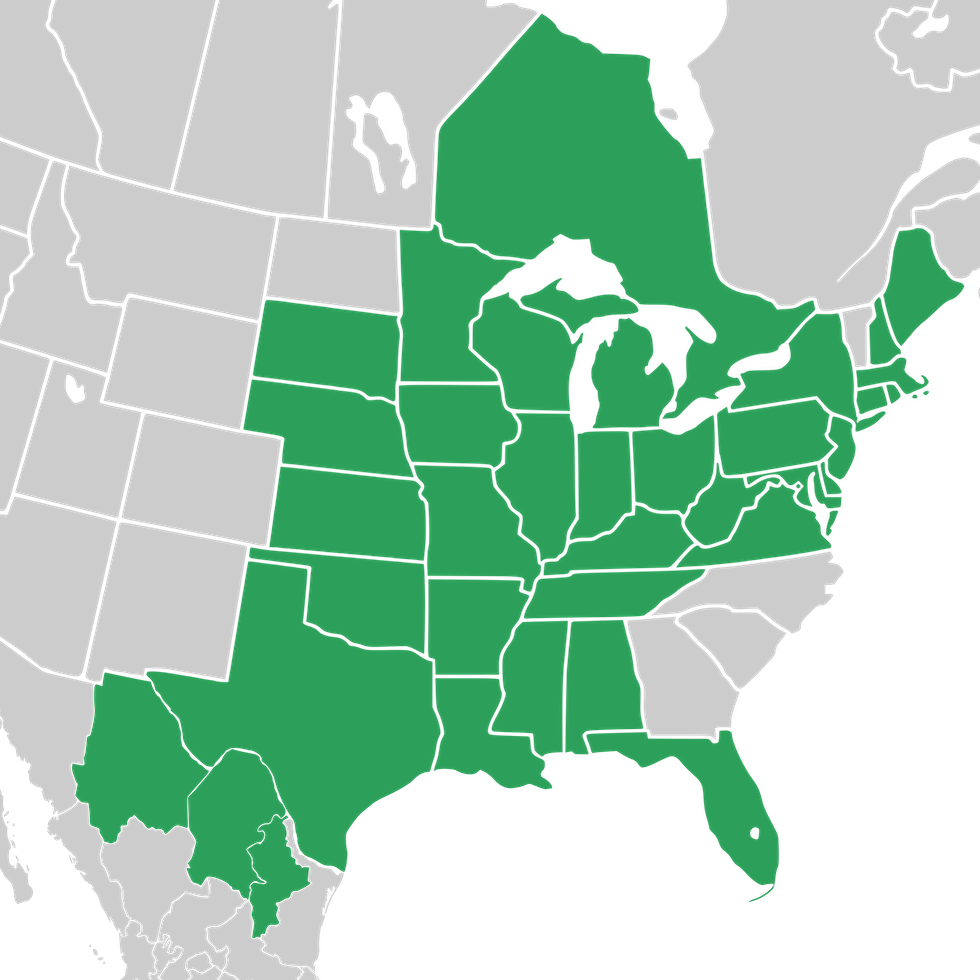
- Native distribution

Synonyms
- Basionym: Aster praealtus Poir.; Alphabetical list: Aster carneus Torr. & A.Gray ex Benth.; Aster carneus var. subasper (Lindl.) Torr. & A.Gray; Aster coerulescens DC.; Aster coerulescens var. angustior (Wiegand) Fernald; Aster coerulescens var. subasper (Lindl. ex Hook.) Fernald; Aster coerulescens var. typicus Cronquist; Aster eminens Willd.; Aster lanceolatus Nutt.; Aster nebraskensis Britton; Aster novi-belgii var. litoreus A.Gray; Aster obliquus Nees; Aster praealtus var. angustior Wiegand; Aster praealtus var. coerulescens (DC.) A.G.Jones; Aster praealtus var. imbricatior Wiegand; Aster praealtus var. nebraskensis (Britton) Wiegand; Aster praealtus var. subasper Wiegand; Aster praealtus var. texicola Wiegand; Aster rigidulus Desf.; Aster robustus Nees; Aster salicifolius Aiton; Aster salicifolius f. coerulescens (DC.) Voss; Aster salicifolius f. obliquus (Nees) Voss; Aster salicifolius var. stenophyllus E.S.Burgess; Aster salicifolius var. subasper (Lindl. ex Hook.) A.Gray; Aster salicifolius f. subasper (Lindl. ex Hook.) Voss; Aster subasper Lindl.; Aster virgatus Nees; Symphyotrichum novi-belgii var. litoreum (A.Gray) G.L.Nesom; Symphyotrichum praealtum subsp. angustior (Wiegand) A.Haines; Symphyotrichum praealtum var. angustior (Wiegand) G.L.Nesom; Symphyotrichum praealtum var. nebraskense (Britton) G.L.Nesom; Symphyotrichum praealtum var. subasperum (Lindl.) G.L.Nesom; Symphyotrichum praealtum var. texicola (Wiegand) G.L.Nesom

= Symphyotrichum praealtum =

Species of flowering plant in the aster family

Symphyotrichum praealtum (formerly Aster praealtus), known as willowleaf aster and willow aster, is a species of flowering plant in the aster family Asteraceae. It is native to North America and introduced in Europe.

== Description ==
Symphyotrichum praealtum is a perennial, herbaceous plant with long rhizomes. The thick, firm leaves have conspicuous reticulate venation below. Flowering occurs from August to November, by which time the lower leaves are often withered. The dense arrays of flower heads are present on the upper, branched portion of the stem. The ray florets are pale violet or lavender and the disc florets are cream or pale yellow.

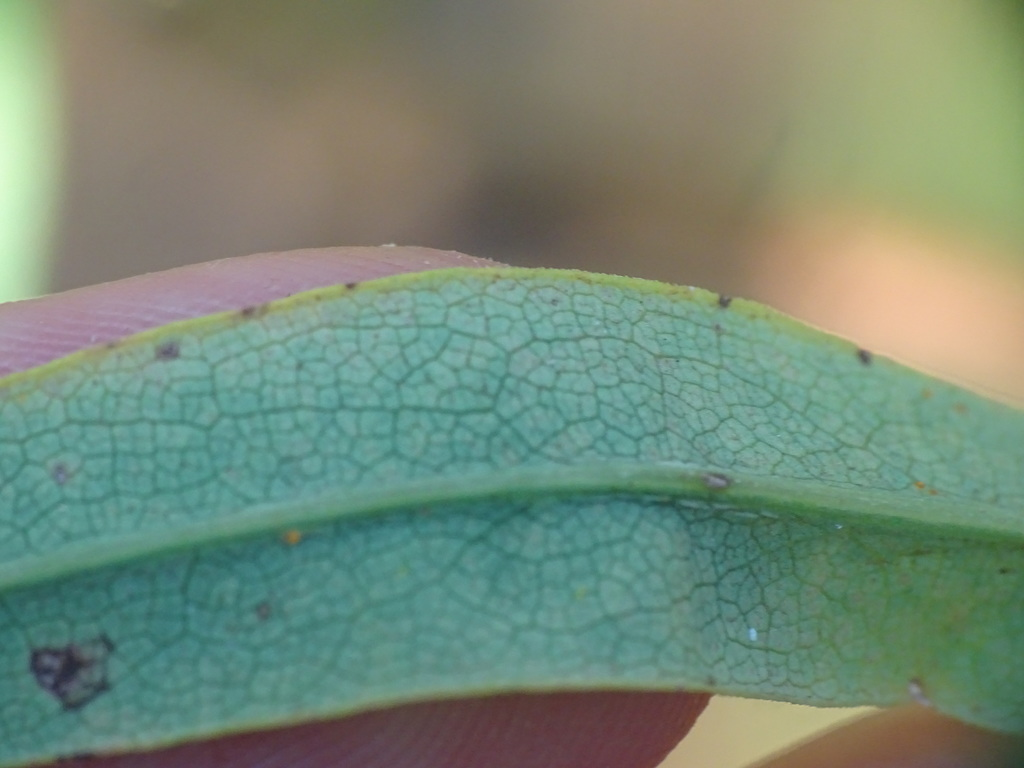
Underside of leaf showing reticulate venation

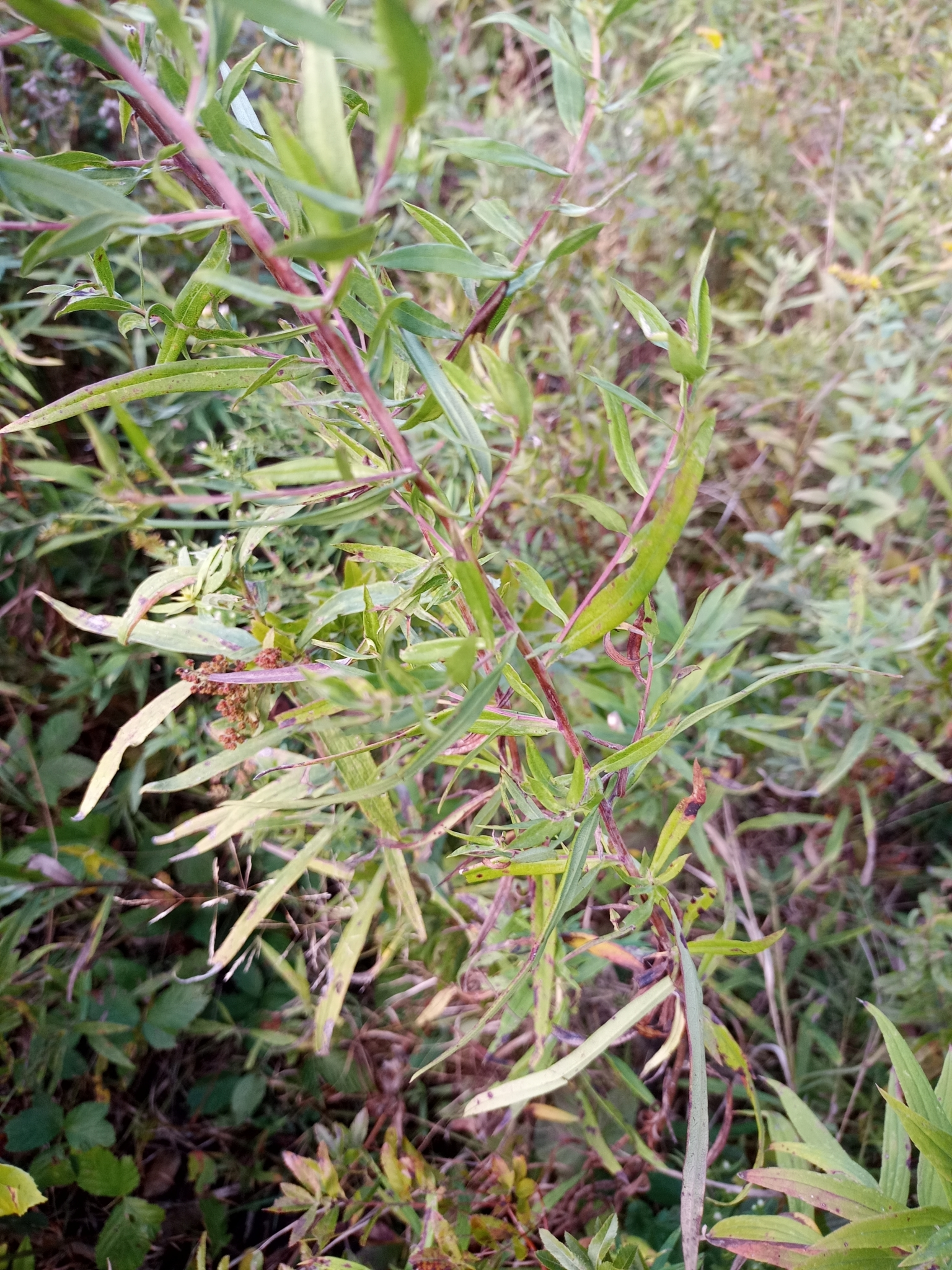
Showing "willow" leaves

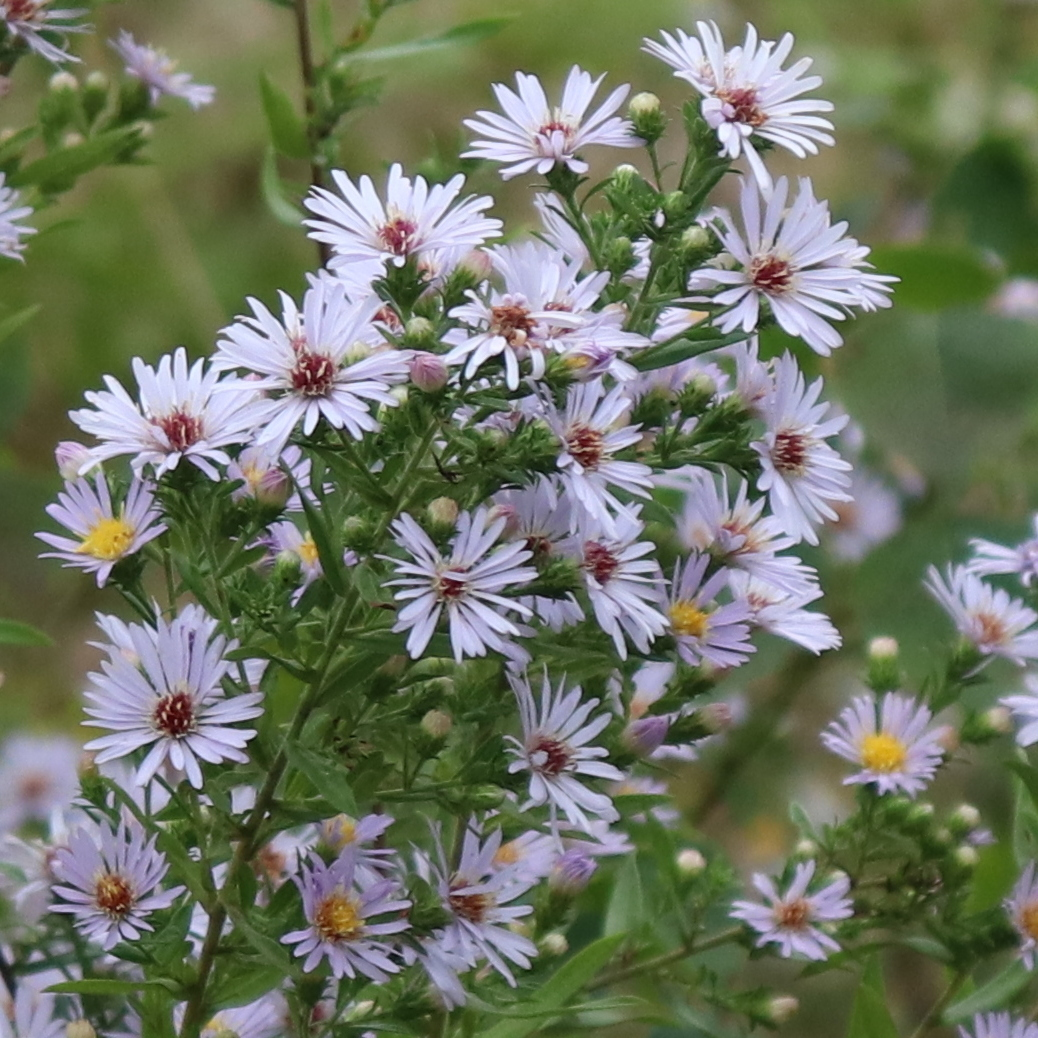
Flower heads

== Taxonomy ==
Symphyotrichum praealtum was formerly included in the large genus Aster as Aster praealtus. However, this broad circumscription of Aster is polyphyletic and the North American asters are now mostly classified in Symphyotrichum and several other genera.

Several varieties of Symphyotrichum praealtum have been recognized, but not consistently. Hybridization with Symphyotrichum lanceolatum and Symphyotrichum firmum has been reported.

== Distribution and habitat ==
Willowleaf aster is native to much of the eastern and central United States, to the Mexican states of Chihuahua, Coahuila, and Nuevo León, and to the extreme southern portion of Ontario, Canada. It has been introduced to central Europe.

Symphyotrichum praealtum is found in moist, open habitats including wet prairies and meadows, shores, oak savannahs, ditches, and roadsides. Periodic disturbance, such as wildfire, drought, or human clearing, is required to maintain open habitats suitable for the species.

== Ecology ==
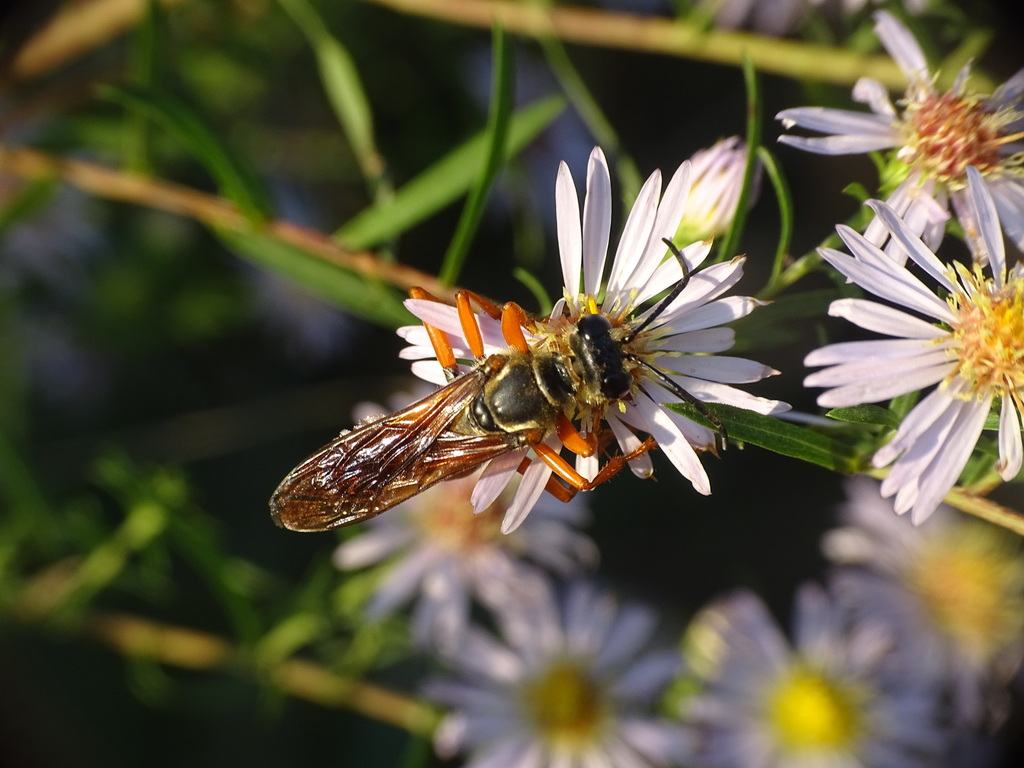
Great golden digger wasp on S. praealtum flower

Symphyotrichum praealtum spreads via rhizomes to form large clonal colonies. The species does not self-pollinate; cross-pollination with a genetically distinct plant is required for the production of seeds. The seeds are wind-dispersed. In some areas, this species may be the latest-flowering plant, and this may limit the number of insects available to serve as pollinators.

== Conservation ==
Willowleaf aster is considered globally secure. However, it is legally listed as endangered in New Jersey and threatened in Ontario. In Ontario it is threatened by habitat loss, invasive species, and a reduction or elimination of natural wildfire. There are under 15 populations known to remain in the province, most of which are within the city of Windsor. To protect these populations, tens of thousands of willowleaf aster plants were moved out of construction areas and replanted elsewhere during construction of the Rt. Hon. Herb Gray Parkway.
