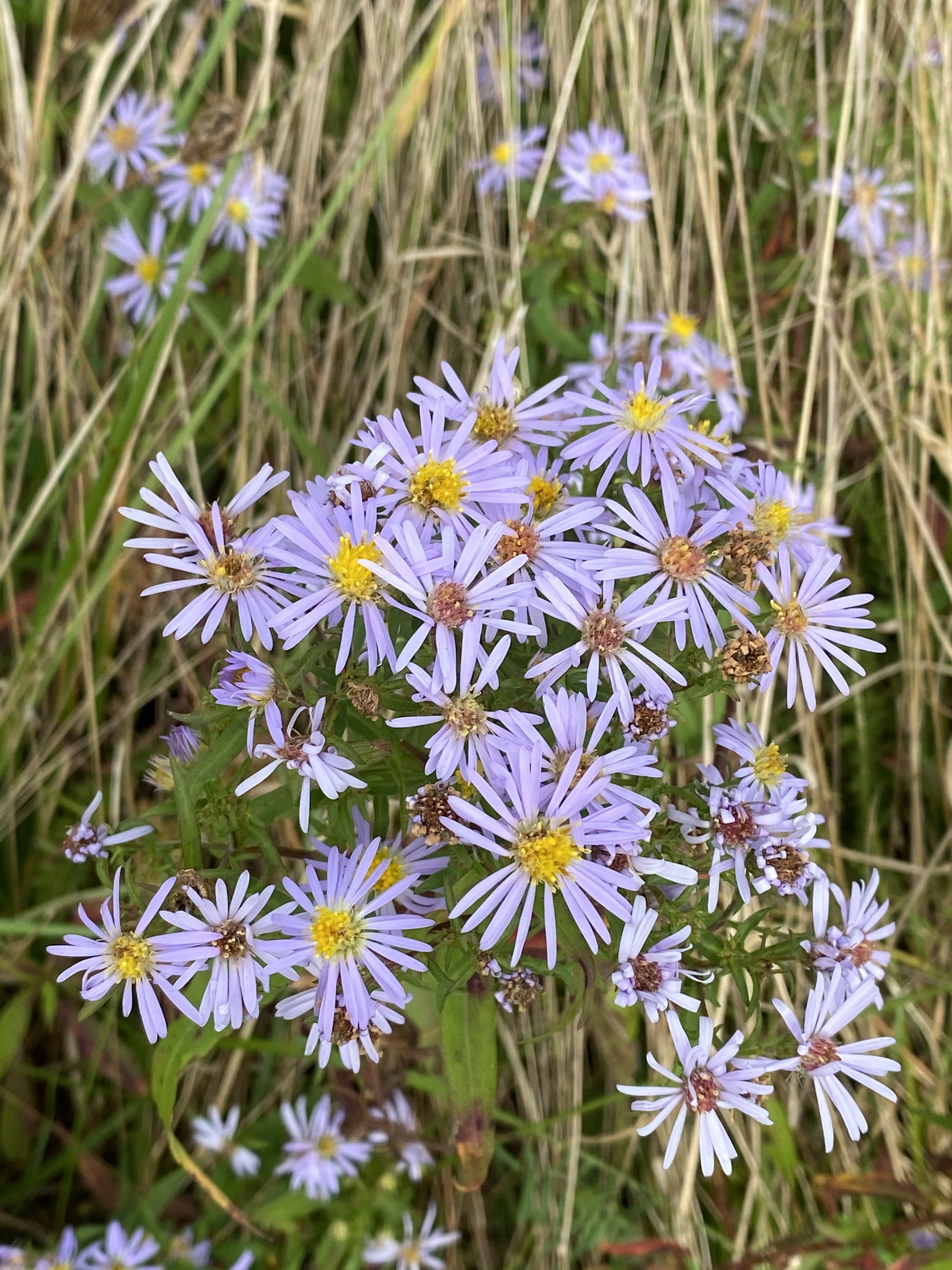

Conservation status
- Secure (NatureServe)

Scientific classification
- Kingdom: Plantae
- Clade: Tracheophytes
- Clade: Angiosperms
- Clade: Eudicots
- Clade: Asterids
- Order: Asterales
- Family: Asteraceae
- Genus: Symphyotrichum
- Subgenus: Symphyotrichum subg. Symphyotrichum
- Section: Symphyotrichum sect. Symphyotrichum
- Species: S. novi-belgii

Binomial name
- Symphyotrichum novi-belgii (L.) G.L.Nesom

Varieties
- List: S. novi-belgii var. novi-belgii; S. novi-belgii var. crenifolium (Fernald) Labrecque & Brouillet; S. novi-belgii var. elodes (Torr. & A.Gray) G.L.Nesom; S. novi-belgii var. villicaule (A.Gray) Labrecque & Brouillet
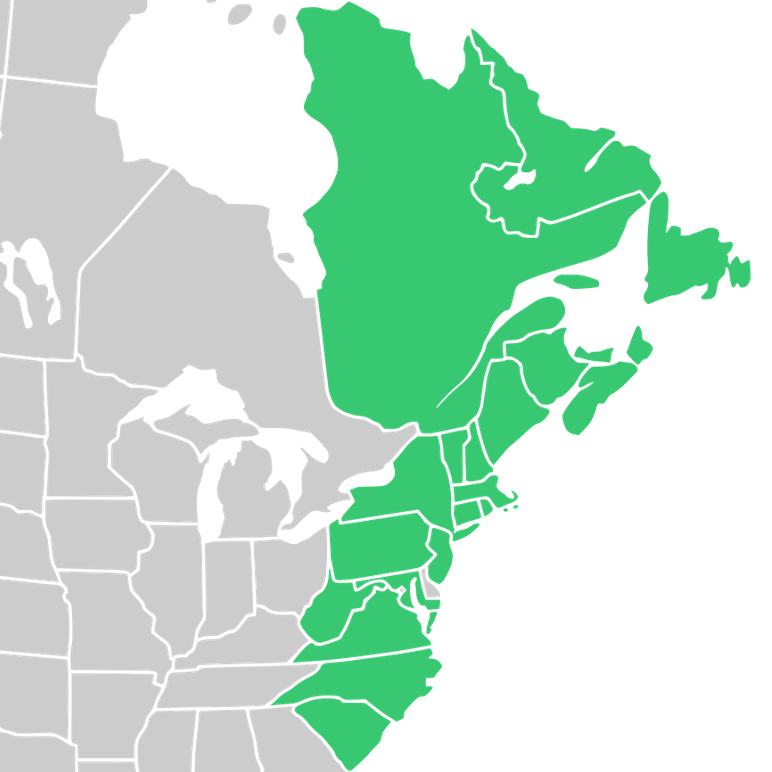
- Native distribution

Synonyms
- Basionym: Aster novi-belgii L.; Alphabetical list: Amellus divaricatus Gaterau; Amellus novae-belgii (L.) Opiz; Aster adulterinus Willd.; Aster aestivus Aiton; Aster aestivus var. angustifolius Nees; Aster aestivus var. laetiflorus A.Gray; Aster argutus Nees; Aster bicolor Dietr. ex DC.; Aster brumalis Nees; Aster caespitosus Lindl.; Aster carneus Nees; Aster crenifolius var. arcuans (Fernald) Cronquist; Aster eminens var. laevigatus Nees; Aster floribundus Willd.; Aster foliaceus var. arcuans Fernald; Aster foliaceus var. sublinearis Griscom & R.J.Eaton; Aster hiemalis Nees; Aster johannensis Fernald; Aster junceus Aiton; Aster junceus var. major Willd. ex Nees; Aster laevigatus Lam.; Aster lateralis Nees; Aster laxifolius Nees; Aster laxifolius var. carneus (Nees) Lindl. ex DC.; Aster laxifolius var. salicifolius Lindl. ex DC.; Aster laxus Torr. & A.Gray; Aster longifolius Lam.; Aster longifolius var. albiflorus DC.; Aster longifolius var. brevirameus DC.; Aster longifolius var. densiflorus DC.; Aster longifolius var. laevigatus (Nees) DC.; Aster longifolius var. major Willd. ex DC.; Aster longifolius f. pallens J.W.Moore; Aster luxurians Spreng.; Aster novi-belgii var. adulterinus (Willd.) Thell.; Aster novi-belgii var. ampliflorus Nees; Aster novi-belgii var. atlanticus E.S.Burgess; Aster novi-belgii var. brittonii E.S.Burgess; Aster novi-belgii subsp. eunovibelgii Thell.; Aster novi-belgii var. floribundus (Willd.) DC.; Aster novi-belgii subsp. floribundus (Willd.) Thell.; Aster novi-belgii subsp. johannensis (Fernald) A.G.Jones; Aster novi-belgii var. johannensis (Fernald) A.G.Jones; Aster novi-belgii var. laevigatus (Lam.) A.Gray; Aster novi-belgii subsp. laevigatus (Lam.) Thell.; Aster novi-belgii var. minor Nees; Aster novi-belgii var. rosaceus J.Rousseau; Aster novi-belgii f. roseus E.L.Rand & Redfield; Aster novi-belgii var. thyrsiflorus (Hoffm.) A.Gray; Aster onustus Nees; Aster onustus var. squarrosus DC.; Aster praealtus Torr. & A.Gray; Aster rolandii Shinners; Aster salicifolius Nees; Aster serotinus Willd.; Aster spectabilis Willd.; Aster squarrosulus Nees; Aster squarrosulus var. albiflorus Nees; Aster tardiflorus Willd.; Aster thyrsiflorus Hoffm.; Aster thyrsiflorus var. squarrosus Lindl.; Aster unctuosus Steud.; Aster uniflorus Moench; Aster vaurealis J.Rousseau; Aster virgineus Nees; Crinitaria humilis Hook.; Symphyotrichum longifolium (Lam.) G.L.Nesom; Symphyotrichum novi-belgii var. laevigatus (Lam.) B.Bock; Symphyotrichum unctuosum Nees

= Symphyotrichum novi-belgii =

Species of plant in the aster family

Symphyotrichum novi-belgii (formerly Aster novi-belgii), commonly called New York aster, is a species of flowering plant. It is the type species for Symphyotrichum, a genus in the family Asteraceae, whose species were once considered to be part of the genus Aster. Plants in both these genera are popularly known as Michaelmas daisy because they bloom around September 29, St. Michael’s Day.

The Latin specific epithet novi-belgii (literally "New Belgium") refers not to modern Belgium, but the 17th century Dutch colony New Netherland which was established on land currently occupied by New York state (as Belgica Foederata was the Latin term for the United Netherlands at the time).

Symphyotrichum novi-belgii grows in abandoned fields and wet meadows in eastern Canada and the northeastern United States.

== Gallery ==
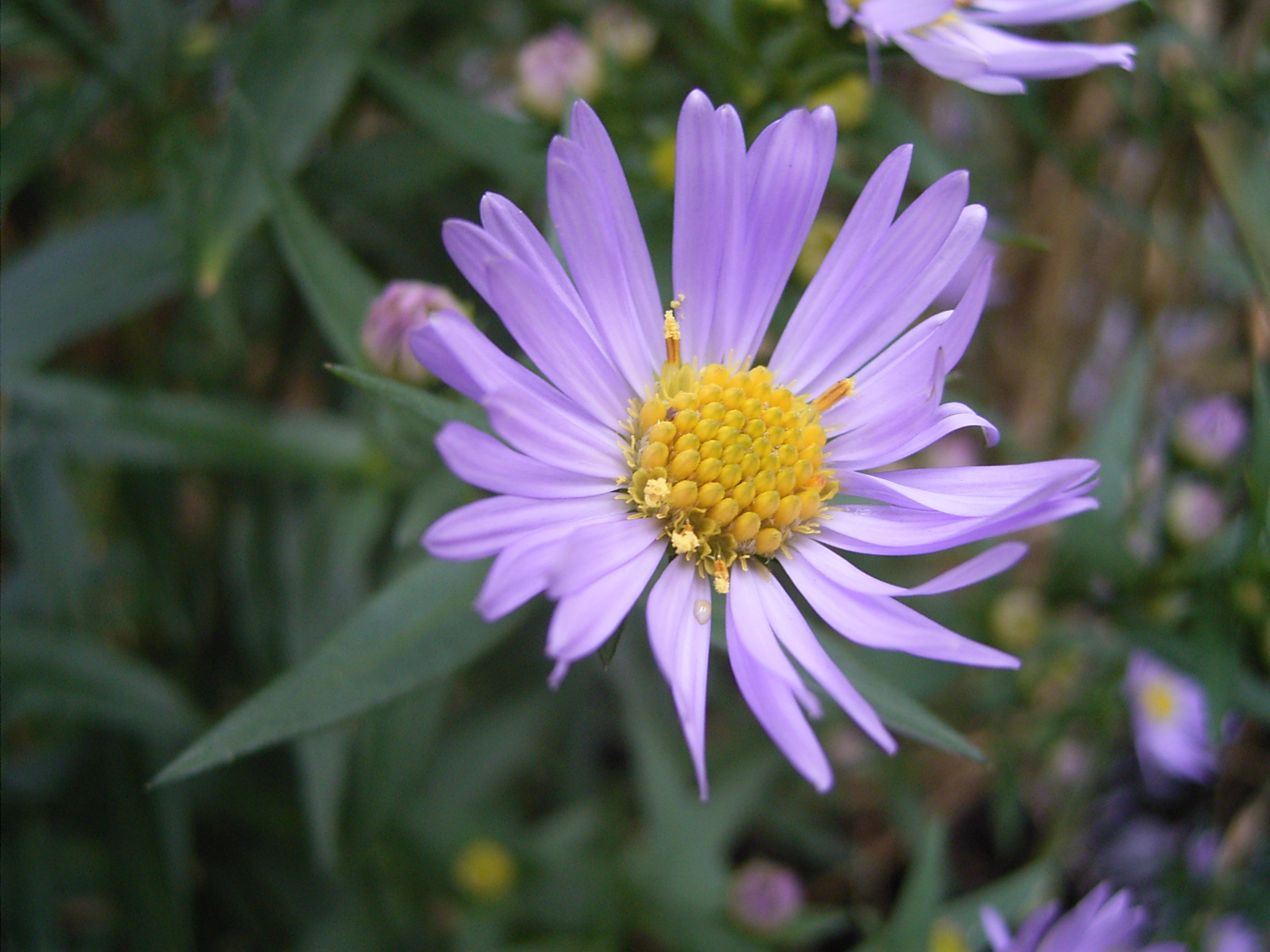

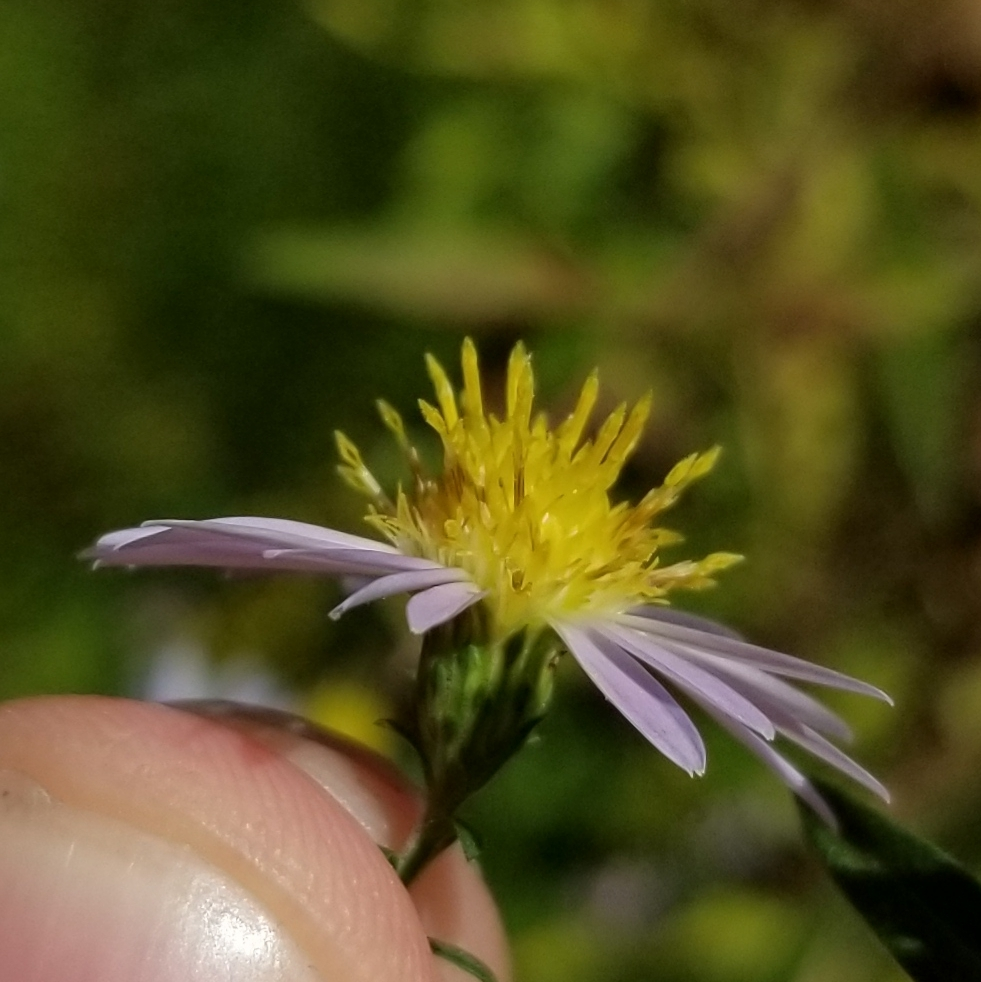

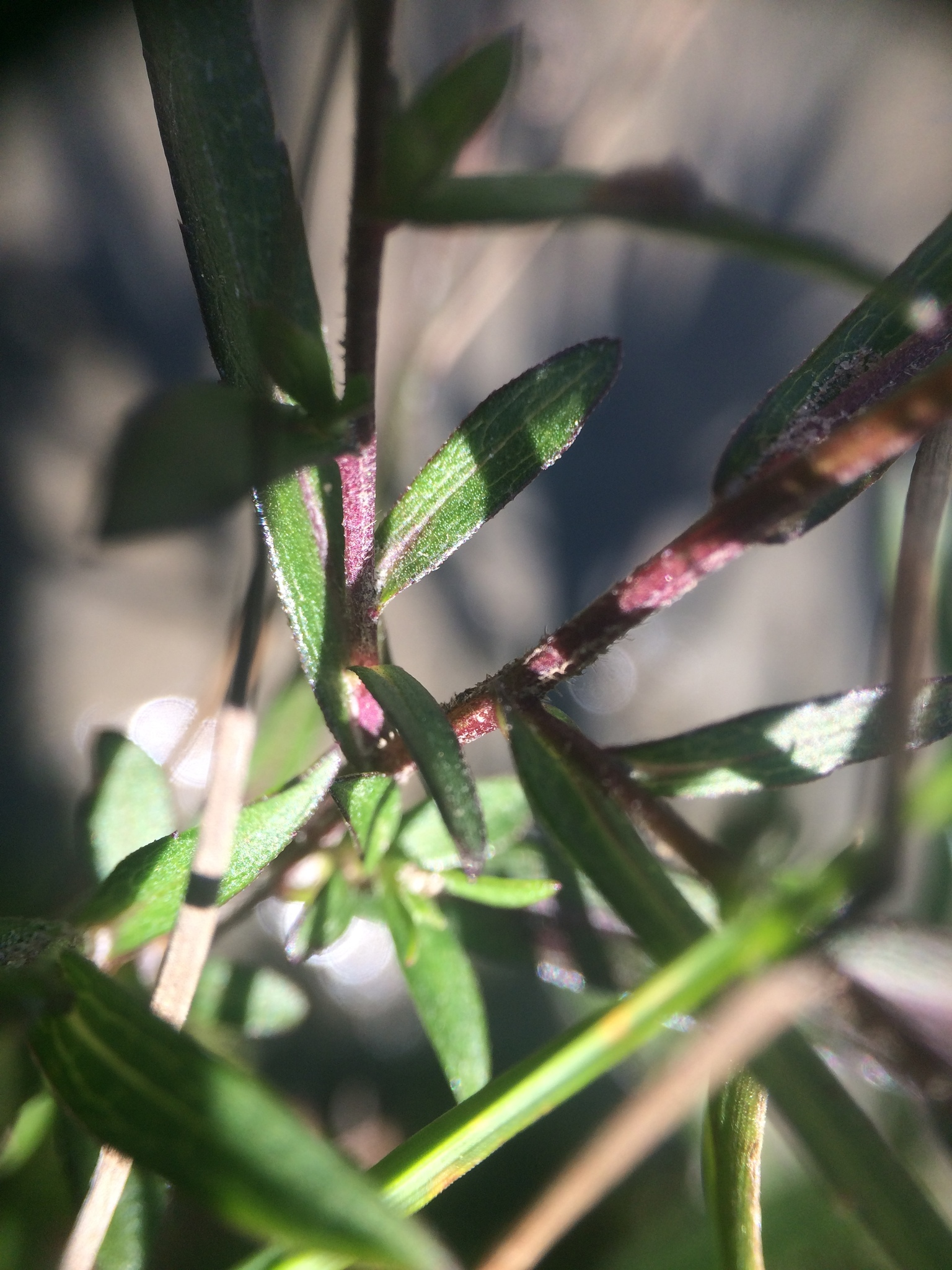

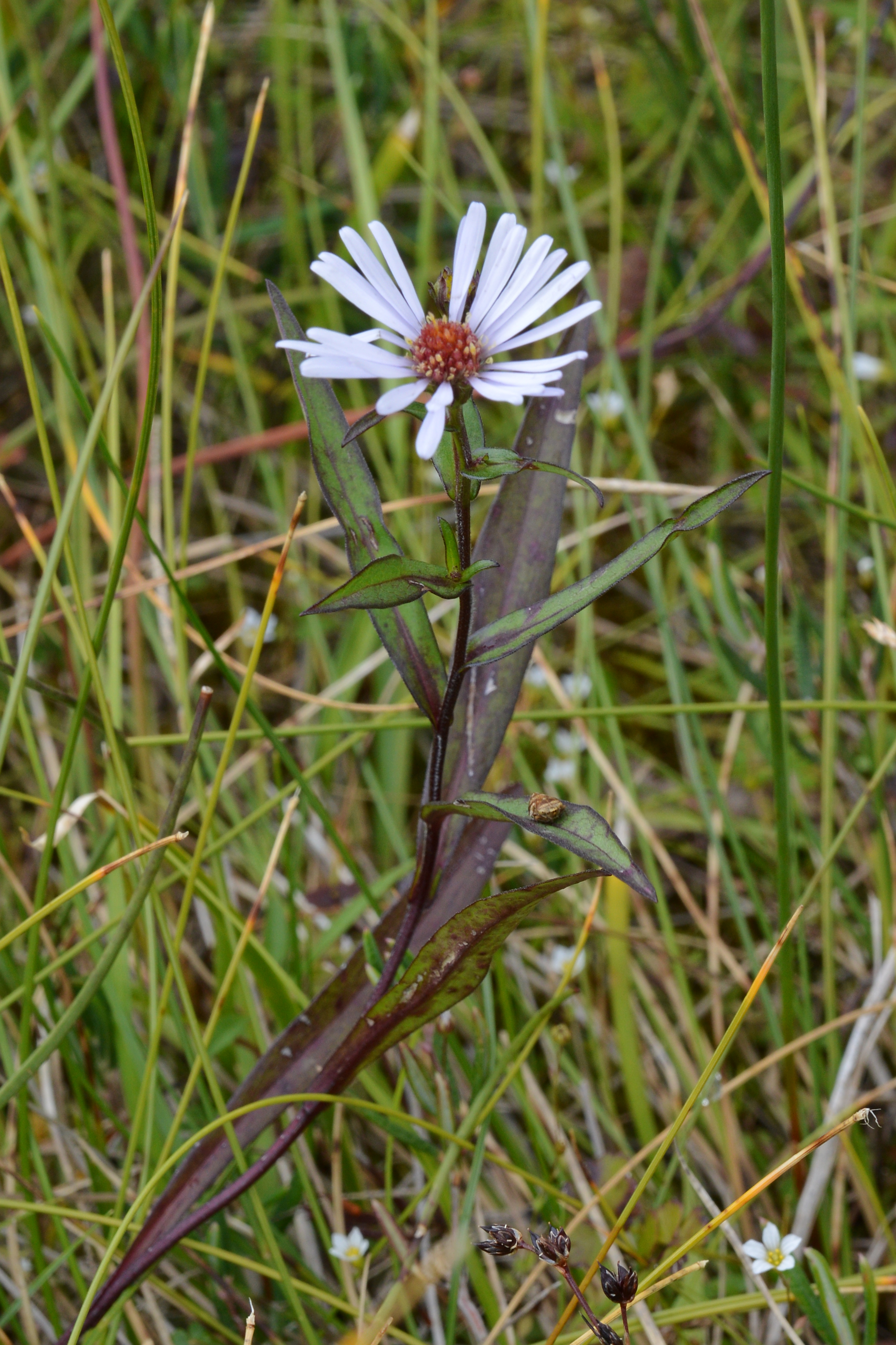

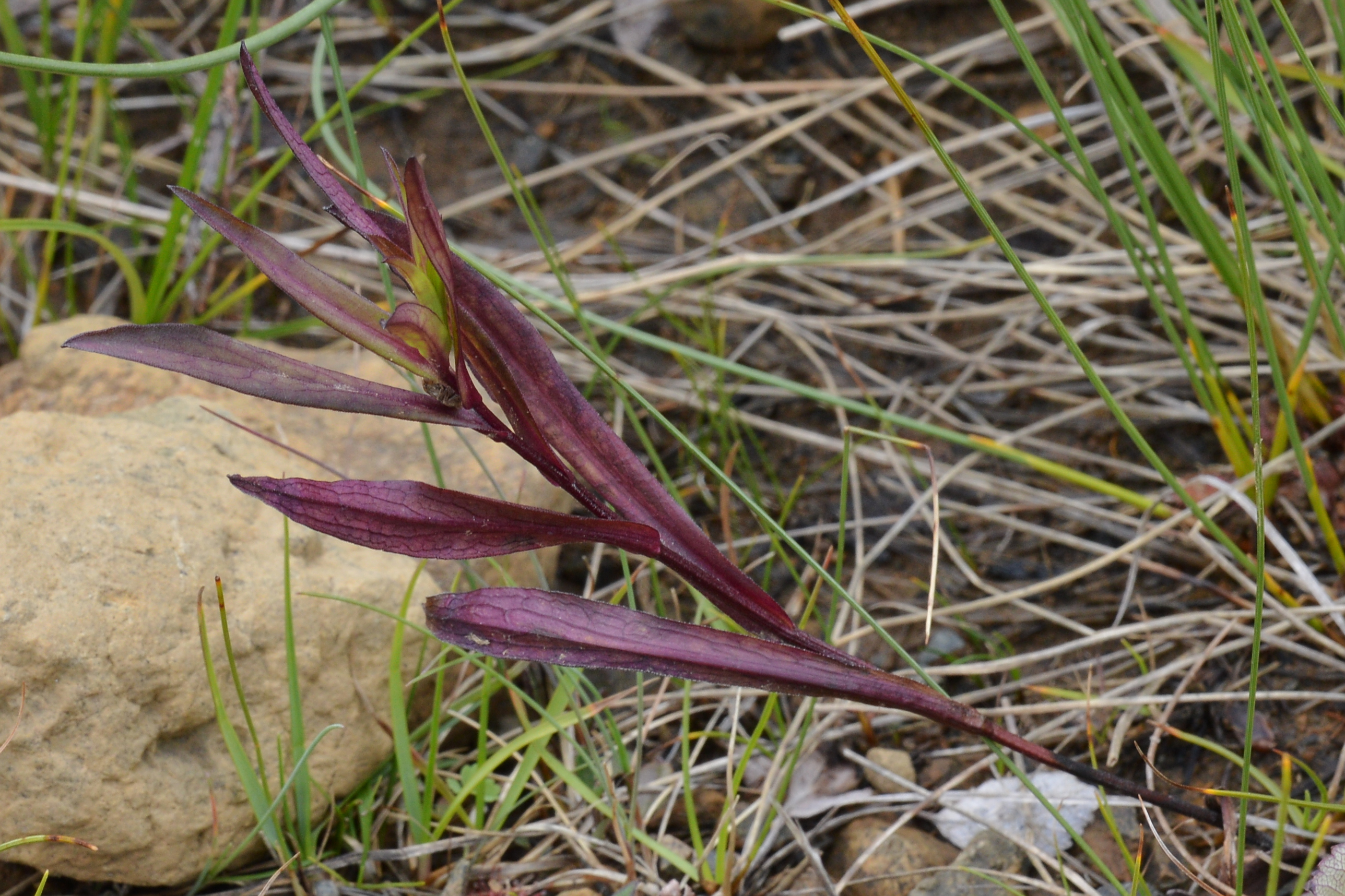

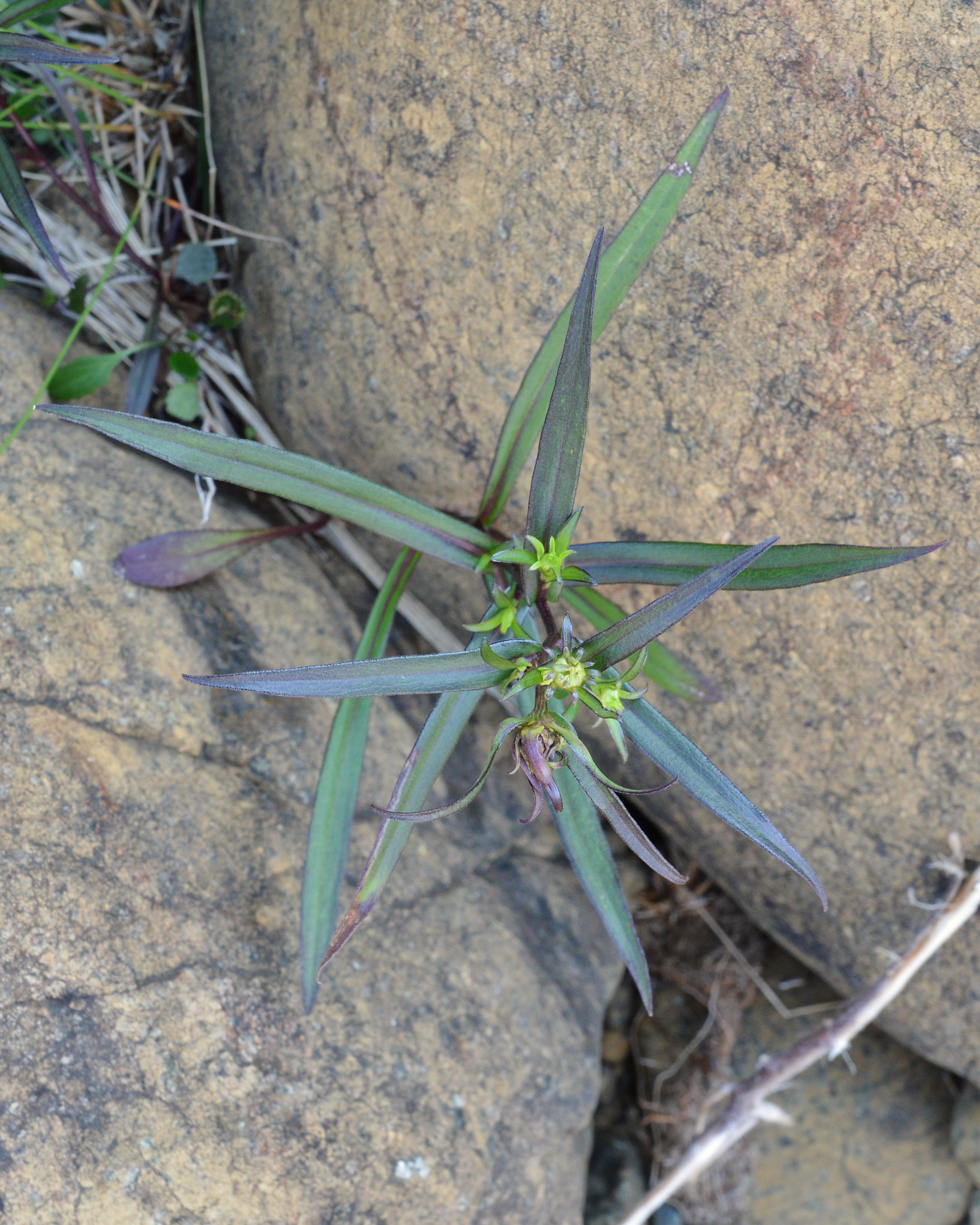

== Distribution ==
New York aster is native to eastern Canada and the eastern United States.

== Cultivation ==
This is the largest group of Michaelmas daisies, with over 1,000 named cultivars. They are valued for their late summer color in shades of blue, pink and white. They are best planted in an open, sunny position, and they are susceptible to fungal infections, especially if conditions are not ideal. The cultivars 'Coombe Fishacre' and 'Fellowship' have gained the Royal Horticultural Society's Award of Garden Merit.

== Etymology ==
The Latin-derived specific epithet novi-belgii means "from New York", which was formerly named Novum Belgium ("New Netherland").
