= Edward Sandford Burgess =

U.S. botanist (1855–1928)

Edward Sanford Burgess
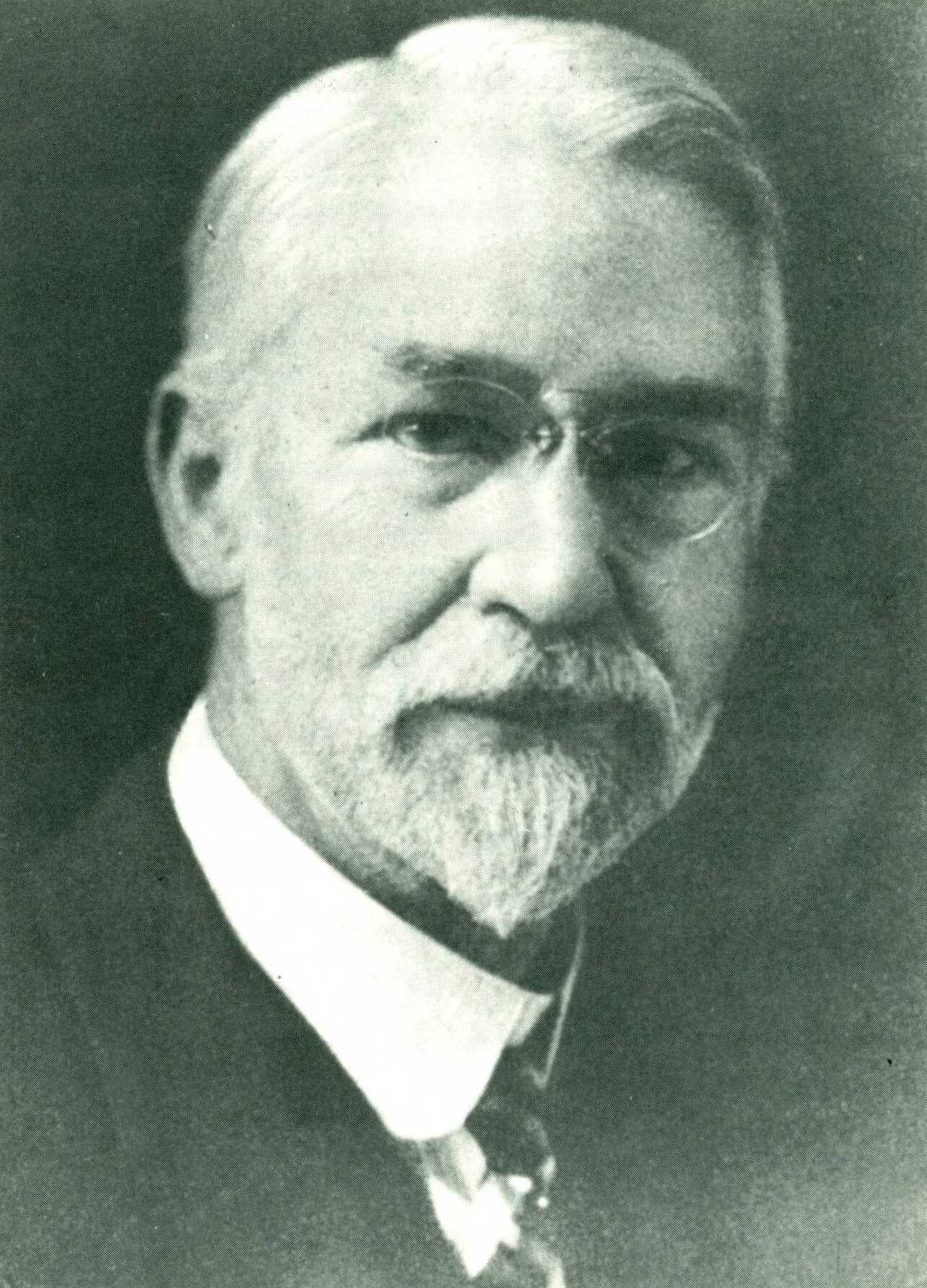
- Born: January 19, 1855; Little Valley, New York
- Died: February 23, 1928 (aged 73); New York City, New York
- Resting place: Sleepy Hollow, New York
- Education: Hamilton College, Columbia University
- Scientific career
- Fields: Botany
- Workplaces: Hunter College
- Author abbrev. (botany): E.S.Burgess

Edward Sanford Burgess (January 19, 1855 – February 23, 1928) was an American botanist and professor.
