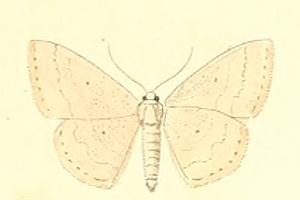

Scientific classification
- Kingdom: Animalia
- Phylum: Arthropoda
- Clade: Pancrustacea
- Class: Insecta
- Order: Lepidoptera
- Family: Geometridae
- Genus: Scopula
- Species: S. turbulentaria

Binomial name
- Scopula turbulentaria (Staudinger, 1870)

Synonyms
- Acidalia turbulentaria Staudinger, 1870; Scopula turbidaria turbulentaria (Staudinger, 1870)

= Scopula turbulentaria =

Species of geometer moth in subfamily Sterrhinae

Scopula turbulentaria, the dotted ochre wave, is a moth of the family Geometridae. It is found in southern Russia, Albania, Romania, Greece, North Macedonia and Italy and on Sardinia, Sicily, Crete, Cyprus, as well as in Turkey.

The wingspan is 18–19 mm.

The larvae feed on Nicotiana species, Plantago lanceolata and other low-growing plants.

== Taxonomy ==
The species was formerly treated as a subspecies of Scopula turbidaria.
