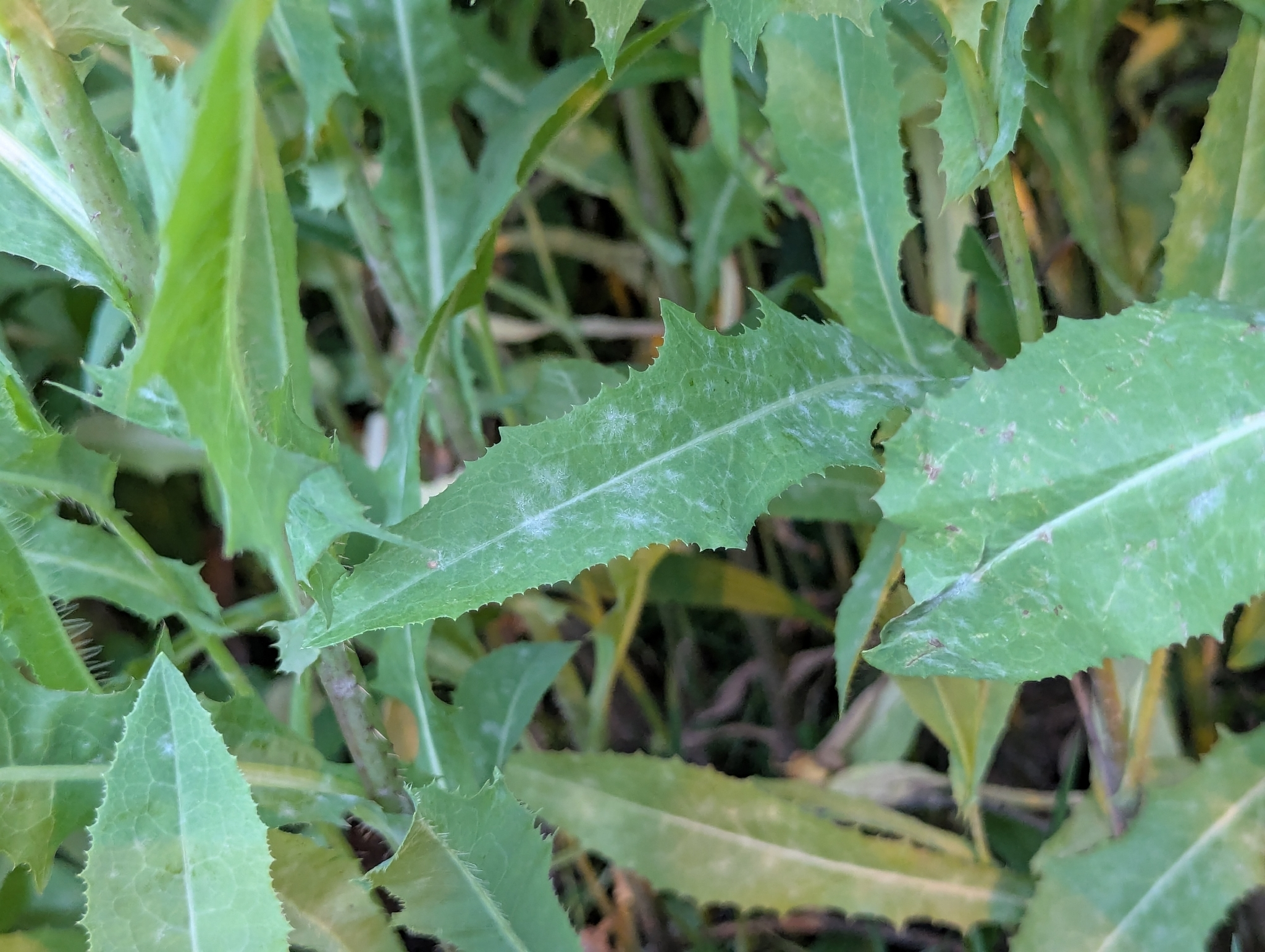
- On Lactuca serriola in the United States

Scientific classification
- Kingdom: Fungi
- Division: Ascomycota
- Class: Leotiomycetes
- Order: Helotiales
- Family: Erysiphaceae
- Genus: Golovinomyces
- Species: G. bolayi

Binomial name
- Golovinomyces bolayi S.Takam., Lebeda & M.Götz

Synonyms
- Erysiphe lamprocarpa f. intybi Thüm, 1875; Erysiphe cichoracearum f. cichorii-intybi Jacz., 1927; Erysiphe cichoracearum f. lactucae Jacz., 1927; Erysiphe cichoracearum f. cichorii S. Blumer, 1967

= Golovinomyces bolayi =

Species of fungul plant pathogen

Golovinomyces bolayi is a species of fungal plant pathogen in the family Erysiphaceae (powdery mildews). It is part of the Golovinomyces orontii complex and is known to infect a diverse range of host plants.

== Hosts ==
The species has been recorded on plants belonging to numerous genera, including Arabidopsis, Campanula, Cichorium, Cucumis, Cucurbita, Cymbalaria, Fragaria, Incarvillea, Kalanchoe, Lactuca, Lamium, Papaver, Petunia, Phyla, Picris, Taraxacum, Torenia, Veronica, and Vigna.

== Taxonomy ==
Golovinomyces bolayi was formally described as a new species in 2019 by S. Takamatsu, A. Lebeda and M. Götz. It was separated from the Golovinomyces orontii species complex using morphological and molecular phylogenetic evidence.

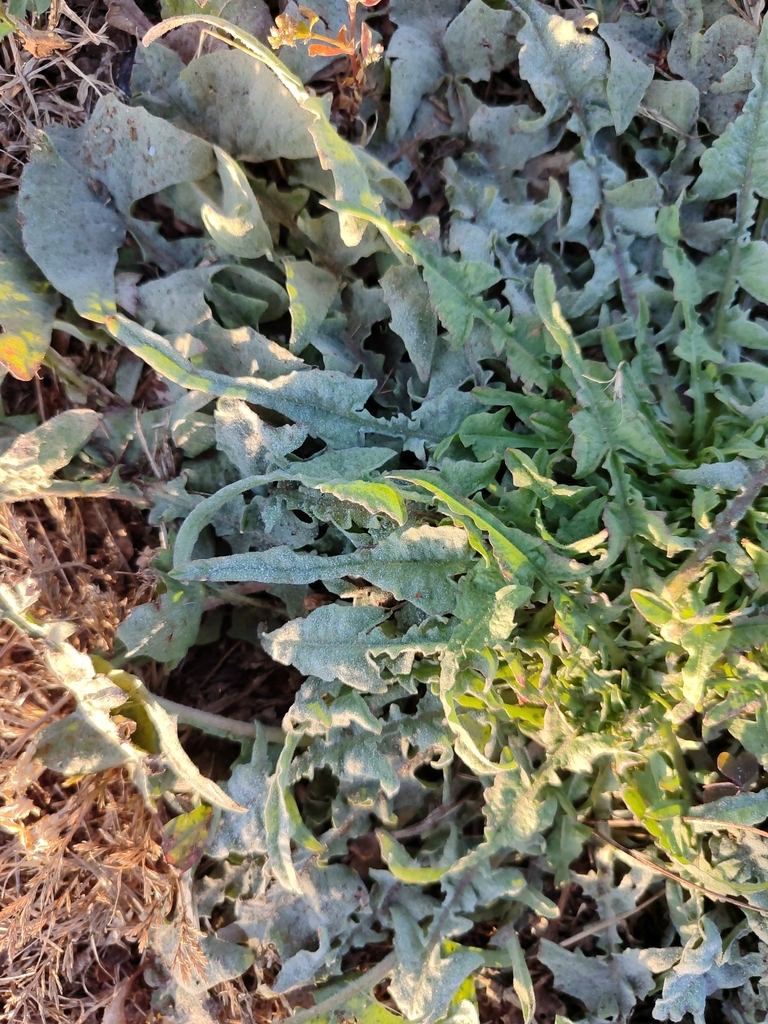
On Cichorium intybus in Italy
