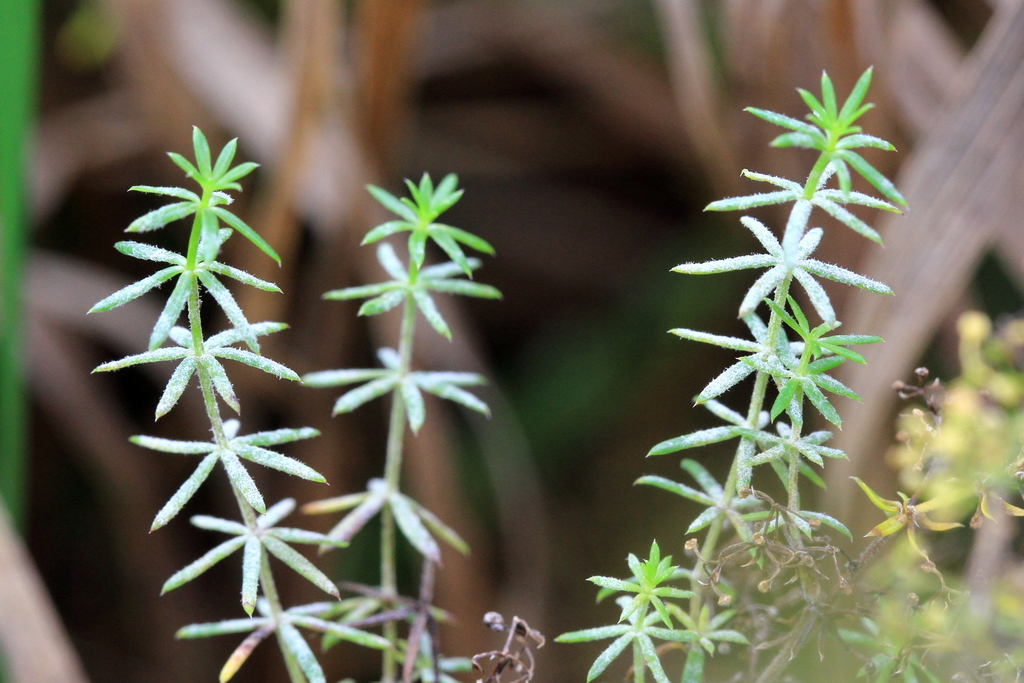

Scientific classification
- Kingdom: Fungi
- Division: Ascomycota
- Class: Leotiomycetes
- Order: Erysiphales
- Family: Erysiphaceae
- Genus: Golovinomyces
- Species: G. galiorum

Binomial name
- Golovinomyces galiorum M. Bradshaw, 2022

= Golovinomyces galiorum =

Species of fungus

Golovinomyces galiorum is a species of powdery mildew in the family Erysiphaceae. It is found in North America, on Galium species native to the region.

== Description ==
The fungus appears as robust, thick, white mycelium on the leaves of its host. Golovinomyces galiorum, like most Erysiphaceae, is highly host-specific and infects only one genus. The species on South American Galium is Golovinomyces calceolariae which is also noticeably less robust. In Europe, other species such as Golovinomyces riedlianus and Neoerysiphe galii can be found (the latter may potentially be introduced to North America).

== Taxonomy ==
The fungus was formally described in 2022 by Michael Bradshaw.
