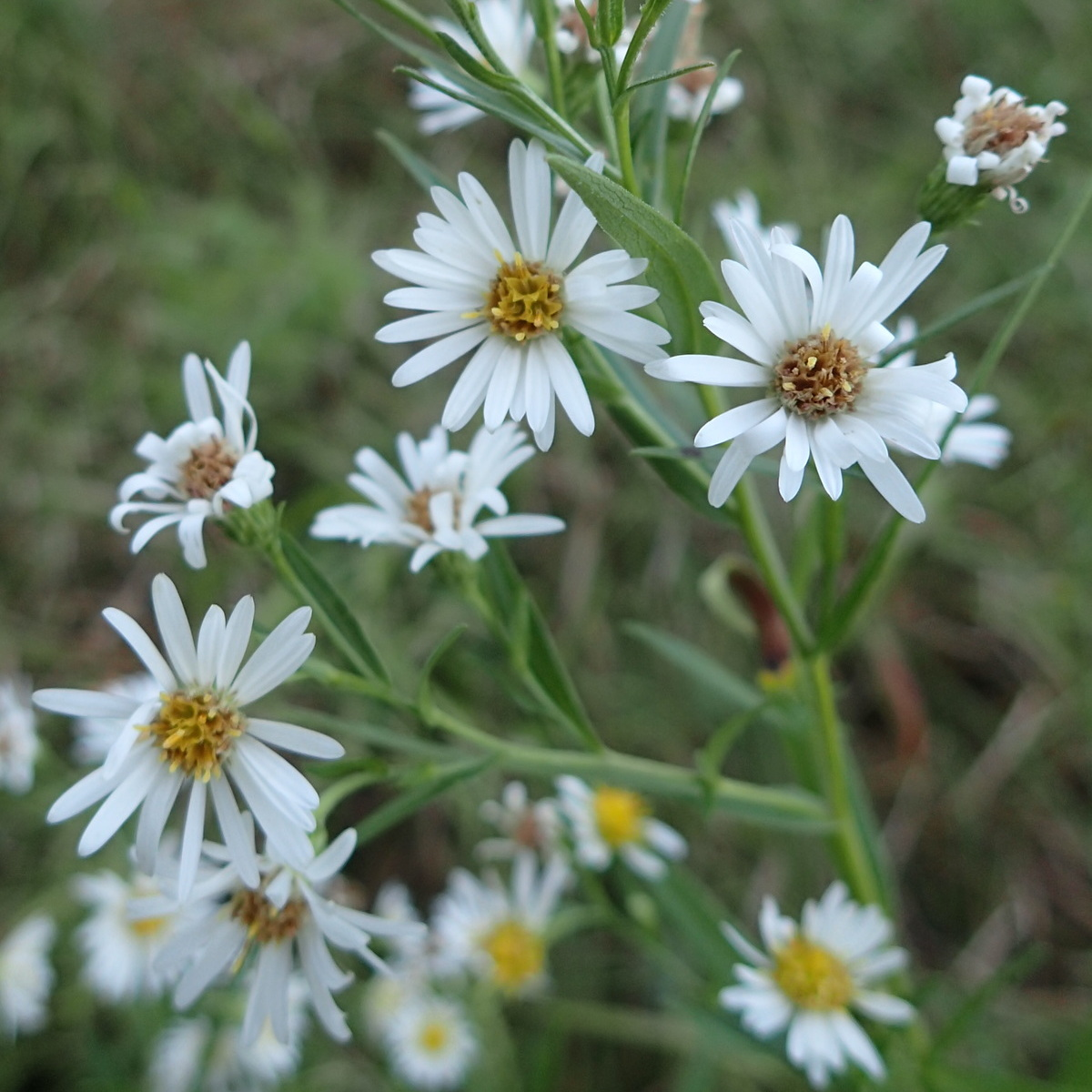

Conservation status
- Secure (NatureServe)

Scientific classification
- Kingdom: Plantae
- Clade: Tracheophytes
- Clade: Angiosperms
- Clade: Eudicots
- Clade: Asterids
- Order: Asterales
- Family: Asteraceae
- Tribe: Astereae
- Subtribe: Symphyotrichinae
- Genus: Symphyotrichum
- Subgenus: Symphyotrichum subg. Symphyotrichum
- Section: Symphyotrichum sect. Symphyotrichum
- Species: S. boreale

Binomial name
- Symphyotrichum boreale (Torr. & A.Gray) Á.Löve & D.Löve
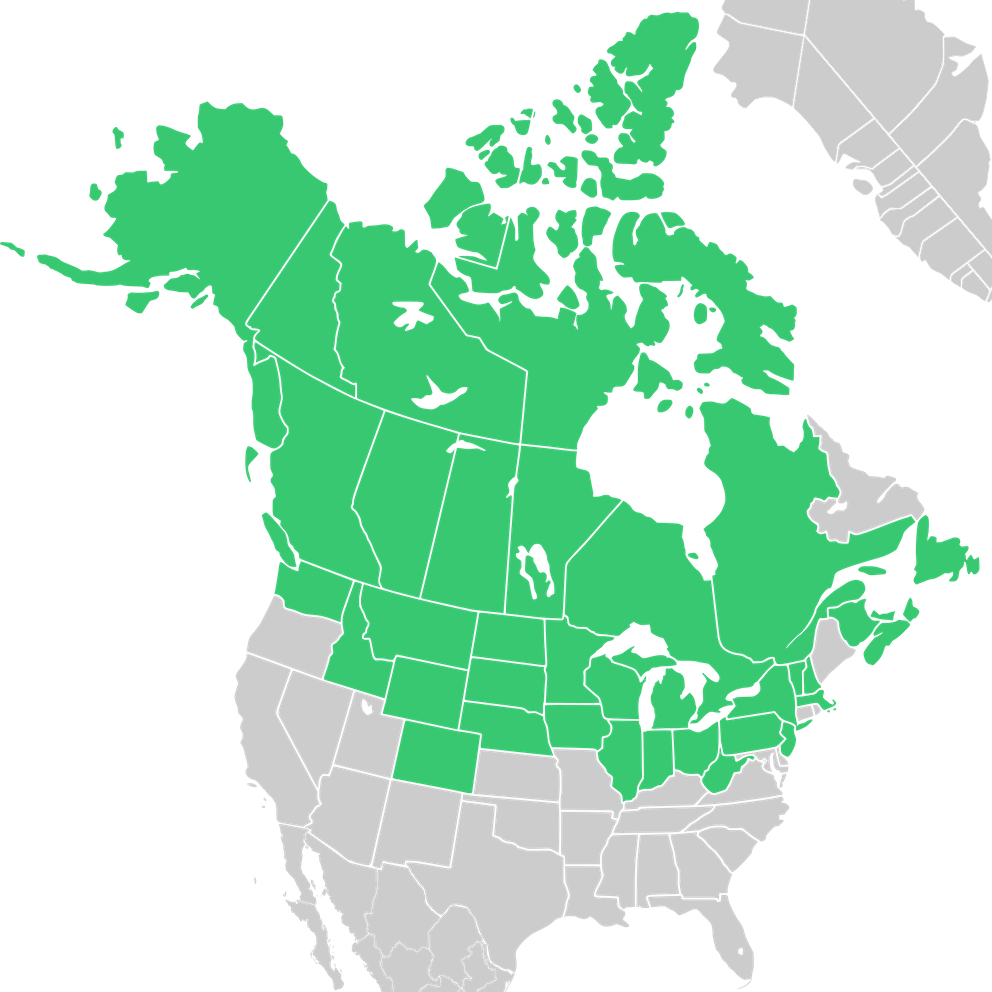
- Native distribution

Synonyms
- Basionym: Aster laxifolius var. borealis Torr. & A.Gray; Alphabetical list: Aster borealis (Torr. & A.Gray) Prov.; Aster junciformis Rydb.; Aster franklinianus Rydb.; Aster eminens Nees; Aster aestivus A.Gray; Aster salicifolius Richardson

= Symphyotrichum boreale =

Species of flowering plant in the daisy family

Symphyotrichum boreale (formerly Aster borealis) is a species of flowering plant of the aster family (Asteraceae) native to North America. Commonly known as rush aster, northern bog aster, and slender white aster, it is a perennial, herbaceous plant that may reach heights of 85 centimetres (2 feet 9 inches).

== Description ==
Symphyotrichum boreale is a perennial, herbaceous plant that reaches between 13 centimetres (5 inches) and 85 cm (2 ft 9 in) high. The leaves, stem, and overall plant form are slender, and it produces long rhizomes. The inflorescence consists of one to several composite flowers. The ray florets are white to pale purple, and the disc florets are cream or pale yellow, becoming purplish. The leaves are simple, with alternate or basal arrangement.

== Taxonomy ==
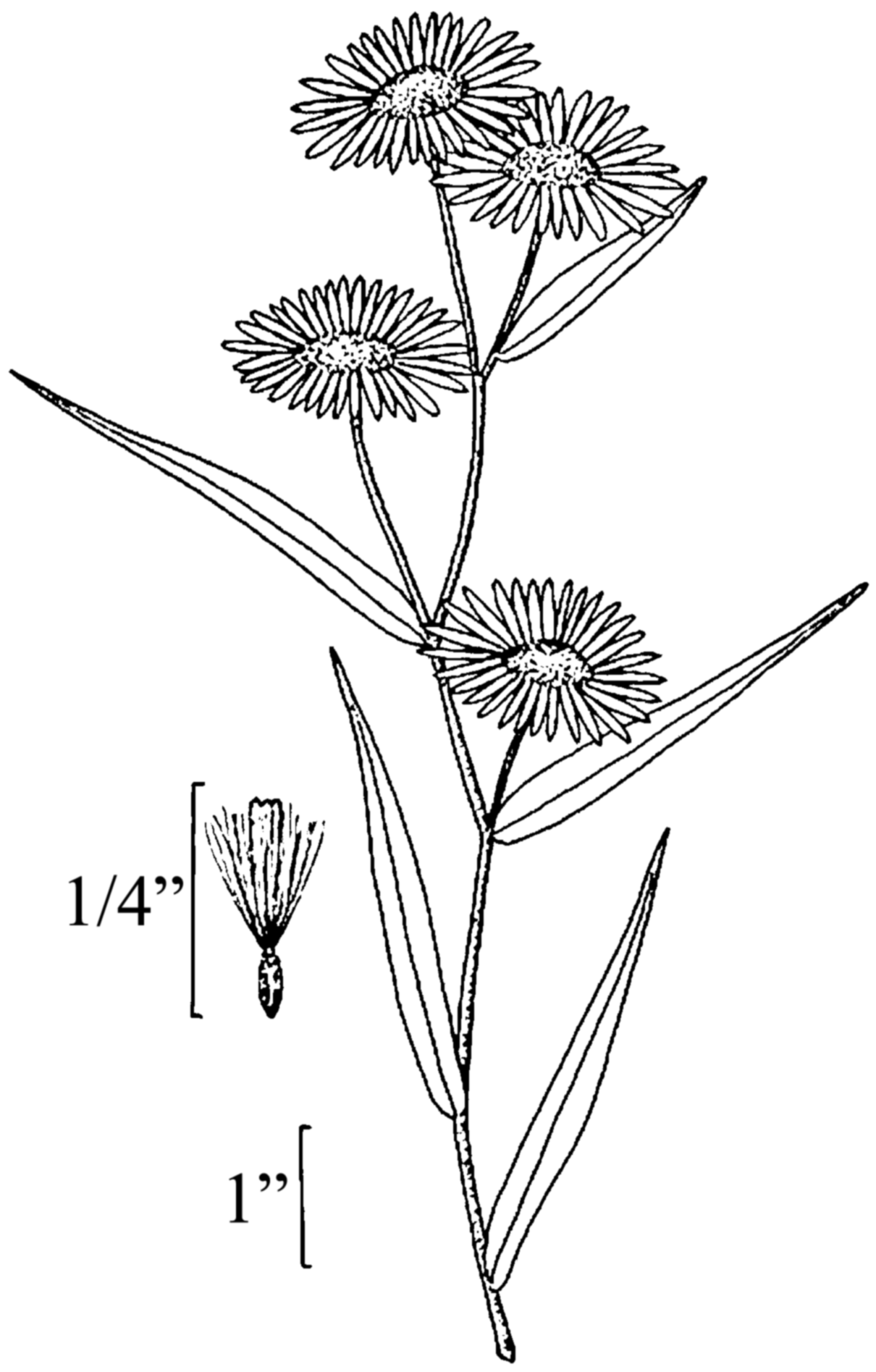
Botanical illustration of S. boreale

Symphyotrichum boreale was formerly included in the large genus Aster as Aster borealis. However, this broad circumscription of Aster is polyphyletic and the North American asters are now mostly classified in Symphyotrichum and several other genera.

Hybrids between this species and Symphyotrichum puniceum have been recorded and are called Symphyotrichum × longulum.

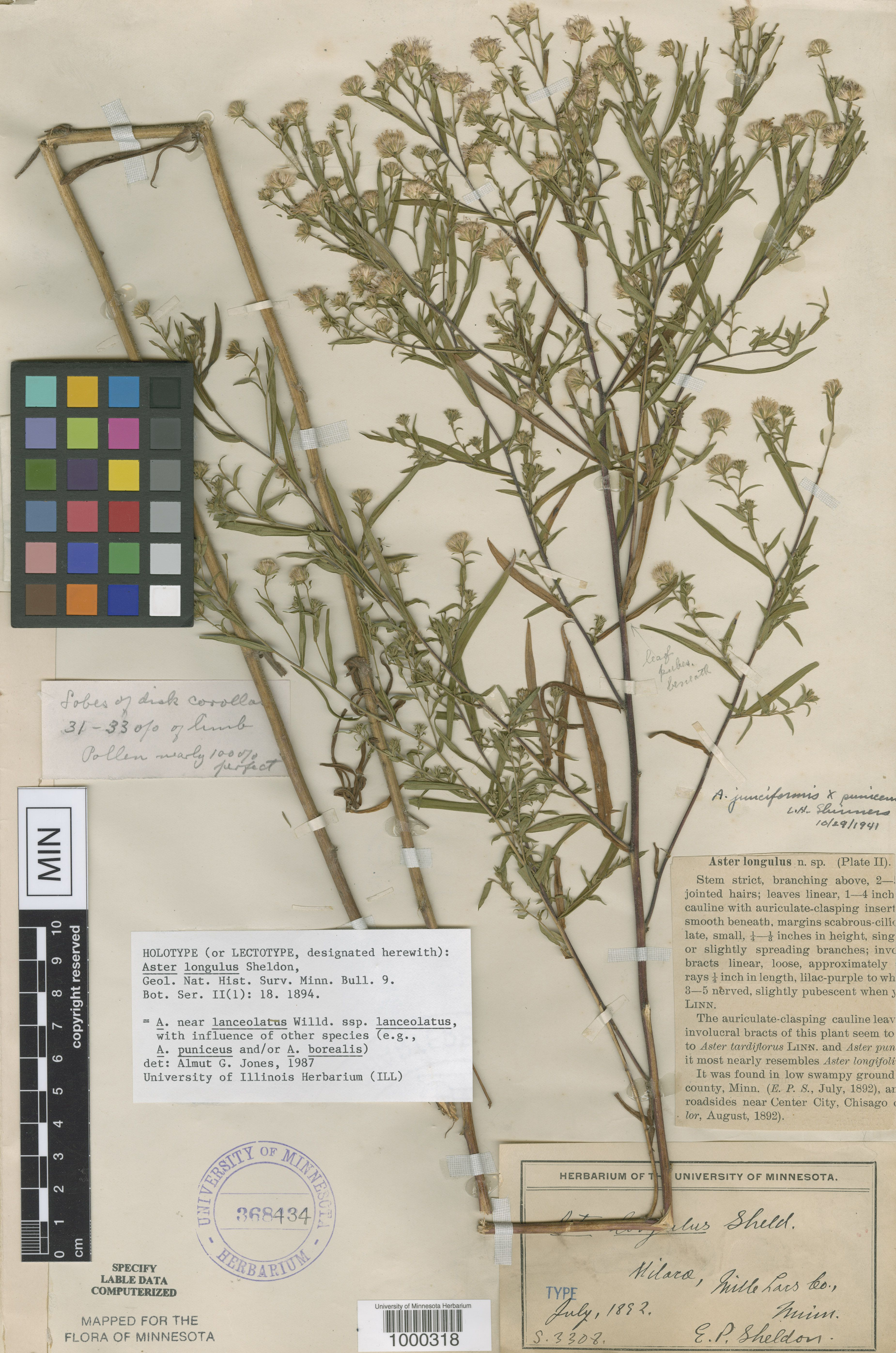
Possible holotype of Aster longulus, basionym of hybrid Symphyotrichum × longulum

== Distribution and habitat ==
Symphyotrichum boreale is native to northern North America from Alaska to Newfoundland, and south to Colorado and West Virginia. It is found in wet, calcareous habitats including fens, marshes, swamps and wet meadows.

== Ecology ==
In addition to vegetative spread via rhizomes, dispersal is accomplished by wind-blown seed. The roots are colonised by symbiotic fungi including arbuscular mycorrhiza and dark septate endophytes. The sac fungus Erysiphe cichoracearum, which causes a powdery mildew, is also known from this species.
