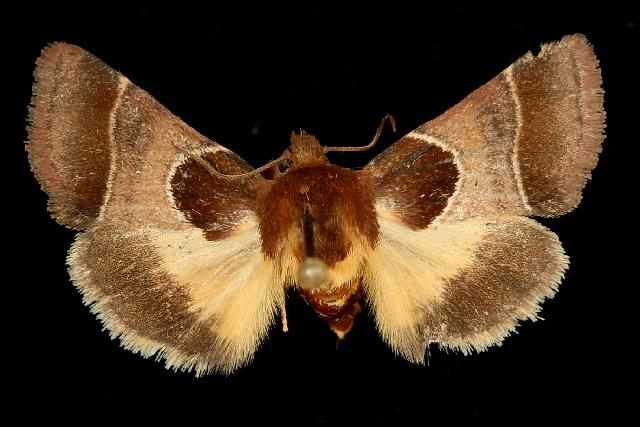

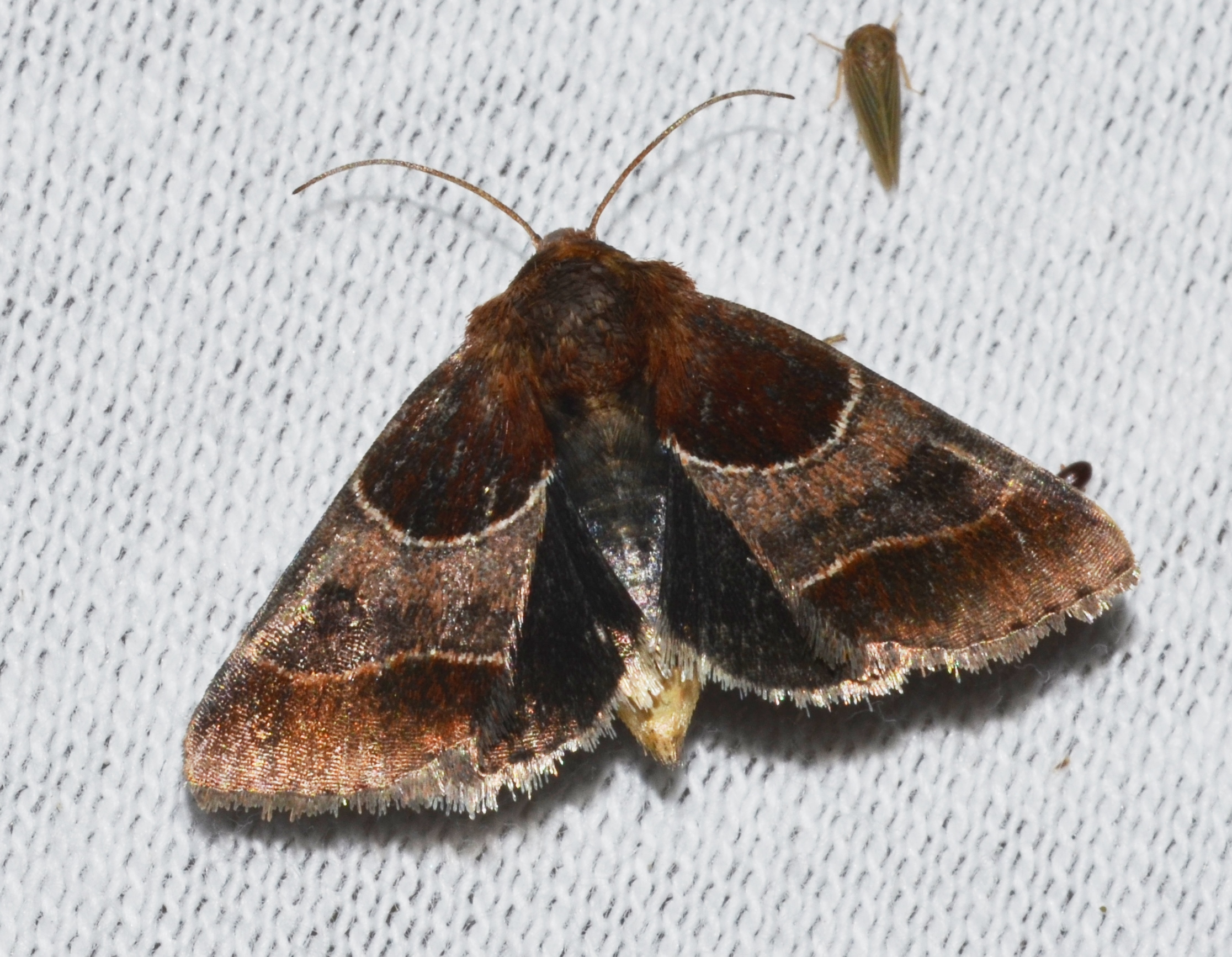

Scientific classification
- Domain: Eukaryota
- Kingdom: Animalia
- Phylum: Arthropoda
- Class: Insecta
- Order: Lepidoptera
- Superfamily: Noctuoidea
- Family: Noctuidae
- Genus: Schinia
- Species: S. arcigera

Binomial name
- Schinia arcigera Guenée, 1852

Synonyms
- Schinia arcifera; Schinia spraguei (Grote, [1863]); Schinia limbalis (Grote, 1875)

= Schinia arcigera =

Species of moth

Schinia arcigera, the arcigera flower moth, is a moth of the family Noctuidae. The species was first described by Achille Guenée in 1852. It is found in North America from Nova Scotia to Florida, west to Arizona and Idaho, north to Saskatchewan.

The wingspan is 22–25 mm. Adults are on wing from July to September in the northeast and from August to October in southern New Jersey.

The larvae feed on Symphyotrichum laeve, Symphyotrichum puniceum, Symphyotrichum ericoides and Psilactis tenuis.

== Subspecies ==
- Schinia arcigera arcigera
- Schinia arcigera ferricasta Smith, 1906

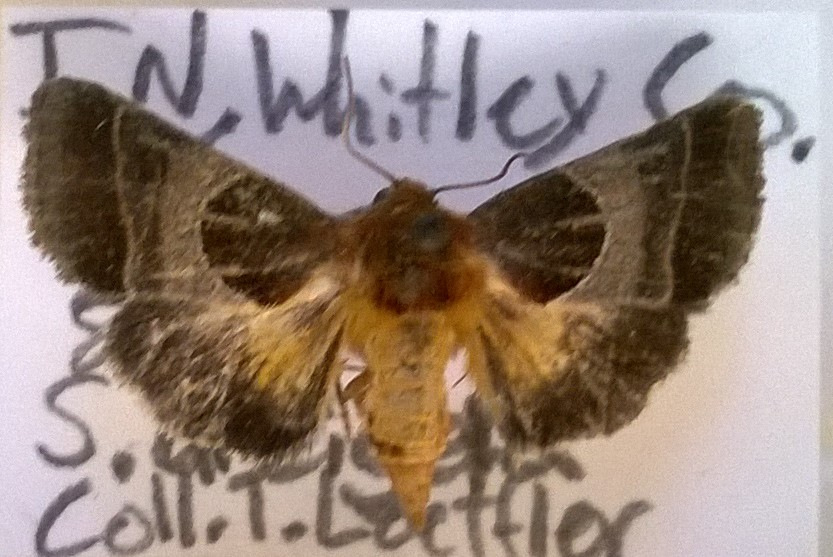
