= Stp4 =

Gene from the model plant, Arabidopsis thaliana

Stp4 (sugar transporter protein 4) is a gene from the model plant, Arabidopsis thaliana. The gene transcribes for an integral membrane protein that is situated in the plasma membrane of sink tissues such as roots, anthers and vascular tissue.

The protein's function is to transport monosaccharide sugars into these sink tissues. The protein is classed as a symporter since sodium ions are also transported concurrently in the same direction. Of special interest to plant scientists is the finding that the transcription of this gene is responsive to environmental stress, more specifically wounding and pathogen infection by the fungal biotroph Golovinomyces cichoracearum (=Erysiphe cichoracearum).

== See also ==
- Sodium-glucose transport proteins
- Glucose transporter
