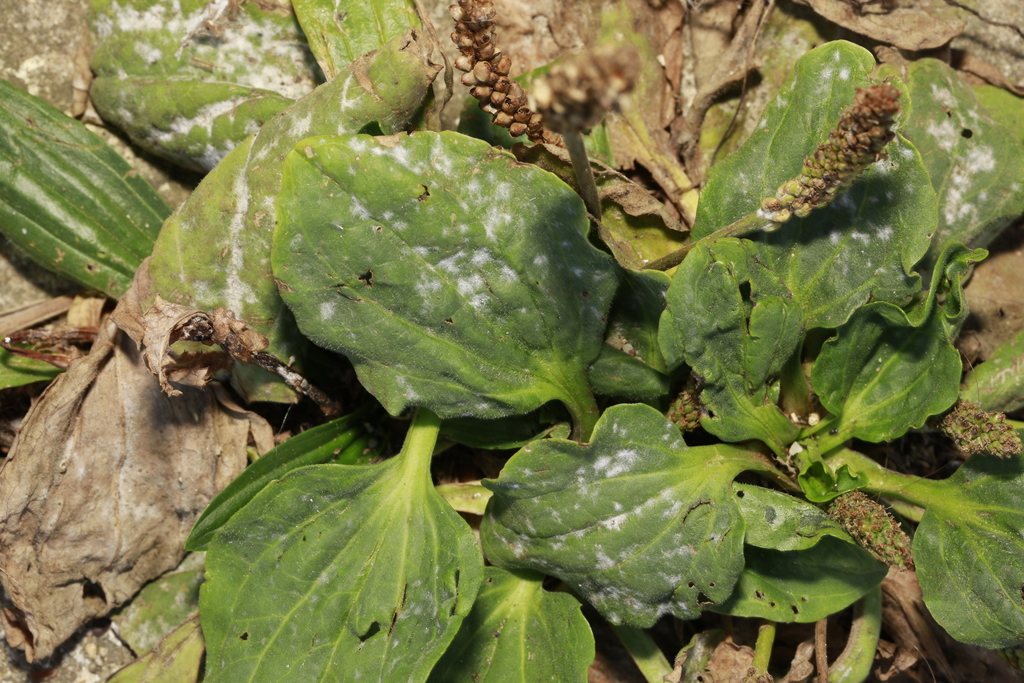

Scientific classification
- Kingdom: Fungi
- Division: Ascomycota
- Class: Leotiomycetes
- Order: Erysiphales
- Family: Erysiphaceae
- Genus: Golovinomyces
- Species: G. sordidus

Binomial name
- Golovinomyces sordidus (L. Junell) Heluta, 1988

Synonyms
- Erysiphe communis var. plantiginearum Fr., 1829; Erysiphe lamprocarpa var. plantaginis Link, 1824; Erysiphe sordida L. Junell, 1965

= Golovinomyces sordidus =

Species of fungus

Golovinomyces sordidus is a species of powdery mildew in the family Erysiphaceae. It is found across the world, where it affects plantains (genus Plantago).

== Description ==
The fungus forms thin, white irregular patches on the leaves of its host. Golovinomyces sordidus is a recognisable and common species in many urban areas across the world. While G. sordidus mostly infects broad-leaved plantains such as P. major, it has been known to infect narrow-leaved plantains such as P. lanceolata, which are also infected by Podosphaera plantaginis. As a result, records on these hosts are best confirmed by microscopy, as macromorphological differences are not yet known.

== Taxonomy ==
The fungus was formally described in 1965 by Lena Junell with the basionym Erysiphe sordida. The type specimen was collected by John Axel Nannfeldt in Uppland, Sweden, where it was found growing on Plantago major. The Ukrainian mycologist Vasyl P. Heluta transferred the taxon to the genus Golovinomyces in 1988.
