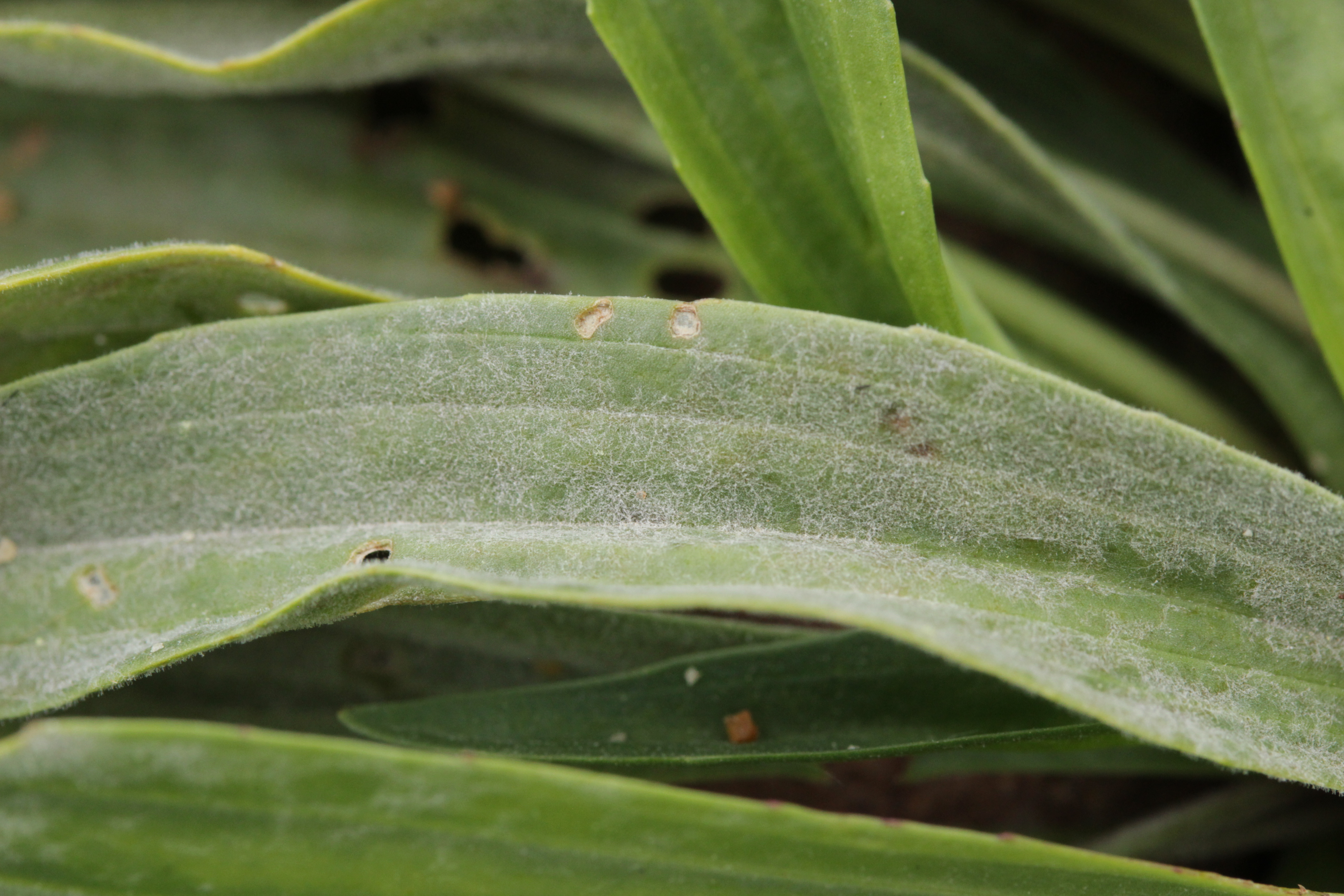

Scientific classification
- Kingdom: Fungi
- Division: Ascomycota
- Class: Leotiomycetes
- Order: Helotiales
- Family: Erysiphaceae
- Genus: Podosphaera
- Species: P. plantaginis

Binomial name
- Podosphaera plantaginis (Castagne) U. Braun & S. Takam., 2000

Synonyms
- Erysiphe plantaginis Castagne, 1845; Sphaerotheca plantaginis (Castagne) L. Junell, 1966

= Podosphaera plantaginis =

Species of mildew

Podosphaera plantaginis is a species of powdery mildew in the family Erysiphaceae. It is found across the world, where it affects plantains (genus Plantago).

== Description ==
The fungus forms thin, white irregular patches on the leaves of its host. P. plantaginis infects narrow-leaved plantains such as Pl. lanceolata, which can also be infected by Golovinomyces sordidus. As a result, records on these hosts are best confirmed by microscopy, as macromorphological differences are not yet known.

== Taxonomy ==
The fungus was formally described in 1965 by Castagne with the basionym Erysiphe plantaginis. The taxon was transferred to the genus Podosphaera by Uwe Braun and Susumu Takamatsu in 2000.
