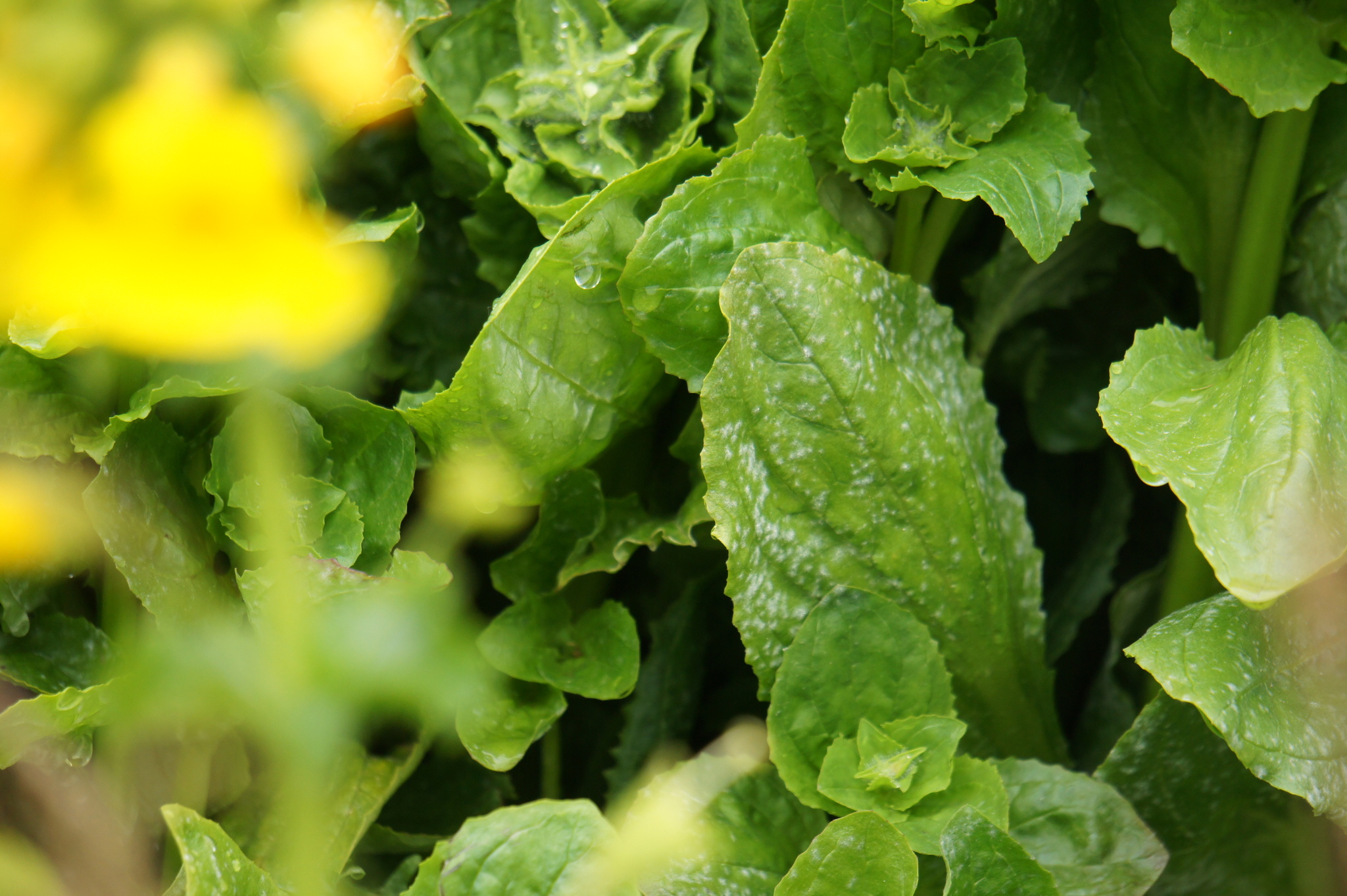
- Golovinomyces brunneopunctatus on Erythranthe guttata

Scientific classification
- Kingdom: Fungi
- Division: Ascomycota
- Class: Leotiomycetes
- Order: Helotiales
- Family: Erysiphaceae
- Genus: Golovinomyces
- Species: G. brunneopunctatus

Binomial name
- Golovinomyces brunneopunctatus (U. Braun) V.P. Heluta, 1988

Synonyms
- Erysiphe brunneopunctata U. Braun, 1984; Erysiphe cichoracearum f. mimuli Jacz., 1927

= Golovinomyces brunneopunctatus =

Species of fungus

Golovinomyces brunneopunctatus is a species of powdery mildew in the family Erysiphaceae. It is found in North America and Europe, where it affects monkeyflowers (Erythranthe, Diplacus and Mimulus sensu lato).

== Description ==
The fungus forms thin, sometimes greyish, patches on both leaf sides of its host. Golovinomyces brunneopunctatus, like most Erysiphaceae, is highly host-specific and infects only three genera. There is another powdery mildew species found on Diplacus in western North America that represents an unknown Phyllactinia sect. Basiphyllactinia species.

== Taxonomy ==
The fungus was formally described in 1984 by Uwe Braun. It was transferred to the genus Golovinomyces by V.P. Heluta in 1988.
