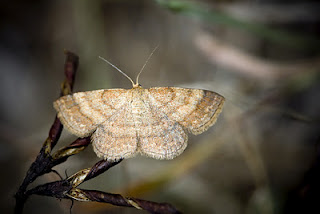

Scientific classification
- Domain: Eukaryota
- Kingdom: Animalia
- Phylum: Arthropoda
- Class: Insecta
- Order: Lepidoptera
- Family: Geometridae
- Genus: Scopula
- Species: S. turbidaria

Binomial name
- Scopula turbidaria (Hübner, 1819)

Synonyms
- Geometra turbidaria Hubner, 1819; Scopula lutosata Rambur, 1866; Acidalia macraria Guenee, 1858; Craspedia collata Warren, 1901; Craspedia habenata Warren, 1901; Acidalia turbidaria syriturcica Wehrli, 1934

= Scopula turbidaria =

Species of geometer moth in subfamily Sterrhinae

Scopula turbidaria is a species of moth in the family Geometridae. It is found in France, Spain and Portugal. It is also found in North Africa (including Morocco).

== Subspecies ==
- Scopula turbidaria turbidaria
- Scopula turbidaria steinbacheri Prout, 1935

Scopula turbidaria turbulentaria was raised to species rank by Hausmann in 2004.
