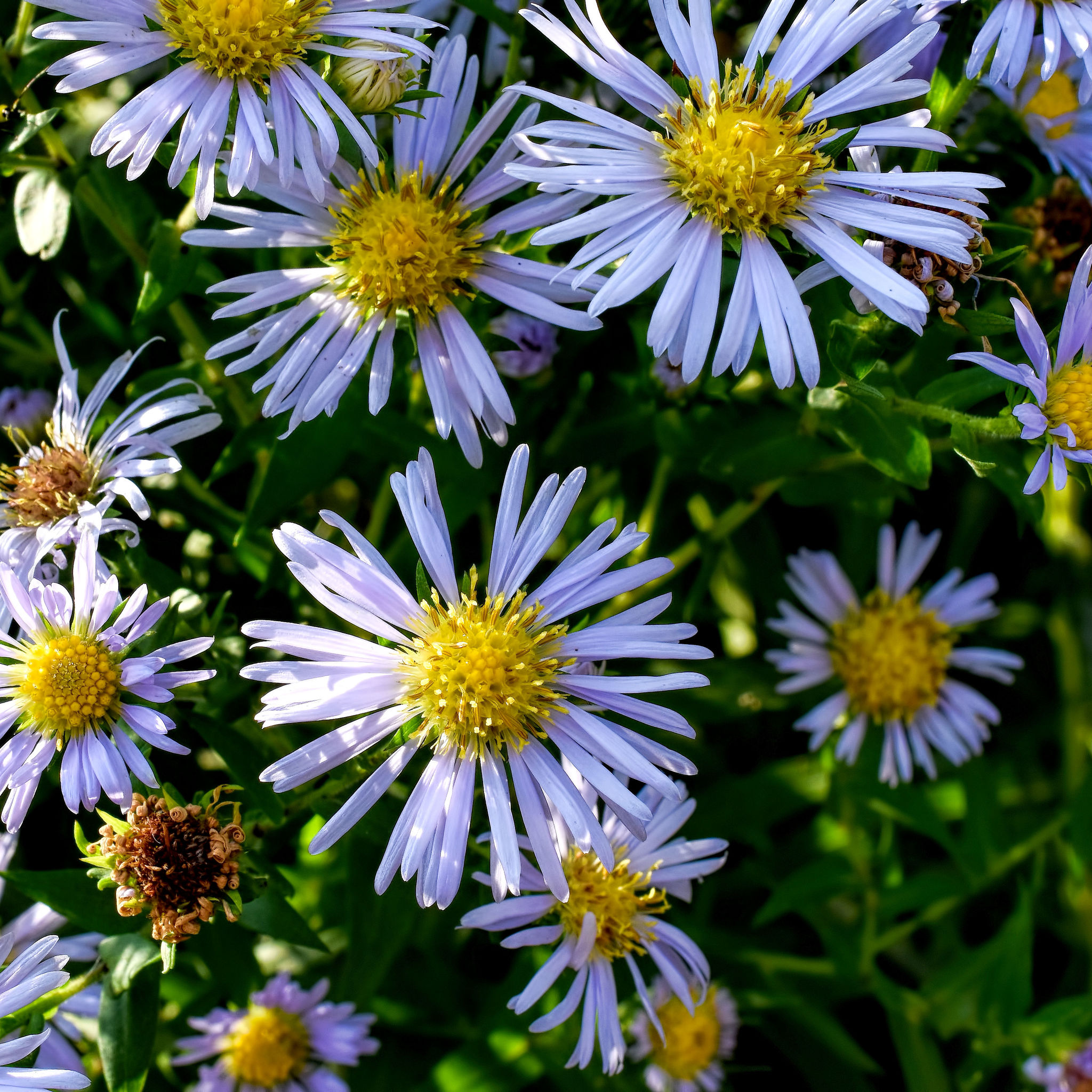

Conservation status
- Secure (NatureServe)

Scientific classification
- Kingdom: Plantae
- Clade: Tracheophytes
- Clade: Angiosperms
- Clade: Eudicots
- Clade: Asterids
- Order: Asterales
- Family: Asteraceae
- Tribe: Astereae
- Subtribe: Symphyotrichinae
- Genus: Symphyotrichum
- Subgenus: Symphyotrichum subg. Symphyotrichum
- Section: Symphyotrichum sect. Symphyotrichum
- Species: S. firmum

Binomial name
- Symphyotrichum firmum (Nees) G.L.Nesom
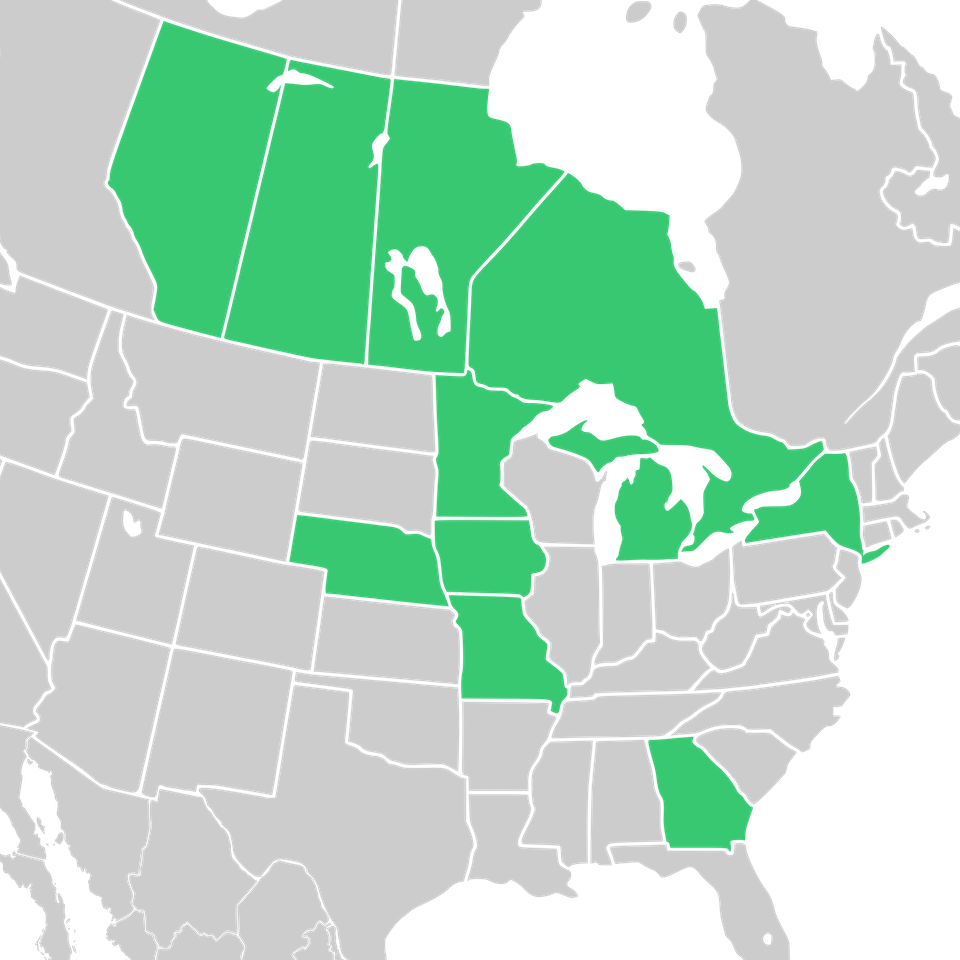
- Native distribution

Synonyms
- Basionym: Aster firmus Nees; Alphabetical list: Aster amoenus Lam.; Aster blandus Pursh; Aster confertus Desf.; Aster hispidus Lam.; Aster lucidulus (A.Gray) Rydb.; Aster lucidulus Wiegand; Aster lucidulus f. albiflorus Benke; Aster lucidulus f. firmus (Nees) Deam; Aster puniceus Torr. & A.Gray; Aster puniceus var. albiflorus Farw.; Aster puniceus f. albiflorus (Farw.) Shinners; Aster puniceus subsp. firmus (Nees) A.G.Jones; Aster puniceus var. firmus (Nees) Torr. & A.Gray; Aster puniceus f. lucidulus (A.Gray) Fernald; Aster puniceus var. lucidulus A.Gray; Diplactis blanda Raf.; Myctanthes punicea Raf.

= Symphyotrichum firmum =

Species of flowering plant

Symphyotrichum firmum (formerly Aster firmus), commonly known as shining aster, shiny-leaved aster, smooth swamp aster, and glossy-leaved aster, is a species of flowering plant in the daisy family Asteraceae native to Canada and the United States.

== Description ==
Symphyotrichum firmum is a perennial herbaceous plant that can reach heights of 2 meters (6 1/2 feet). It forms large colonies with long, creeping rhizomes. The stem is hairless or it may have stiff, short hairs, often formed in vertical lines. It is sometimes dark red or purple at the nodes (where the leaf connects to the stem). The leaves are alternate, up to 15 centimeters (6 inches) long and 3 cm (1 1/5 in) wide, and clasp the stem. The main vein on the lower leaf surface is hairless or slightly hairy near the tip.

It flowers August through October. The flower heads are 1.5 to 3.5 cm (5/8 to 1 3/8 in) across with up to 40 ray florets and 50 disc florets. The ray florets range from white to pale blue or lavender. The disc florets are yellow to cream-colored, becoming pink or purple with maturity.

S. firmum has a diploid chromosome count with a base number of x = 8 (2n = 16).

Compared to the closely related Symphyotrichum puniceum, S. firmum is less hairy overall, has denser inflorescences of smaller, whiter flowers, and grows in larger, denser patches.

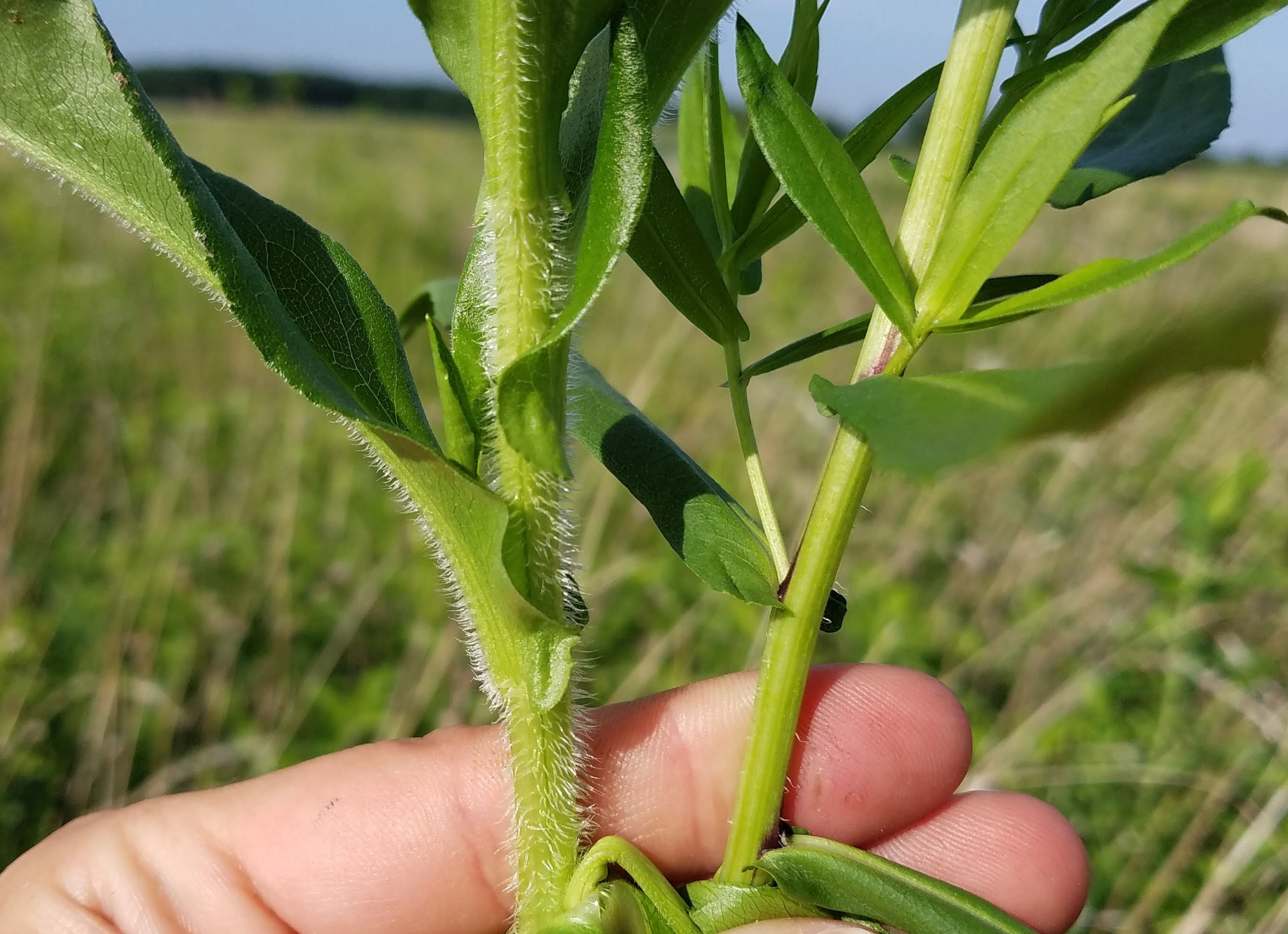
Symphyotrichum puniceum on left and S. firmum on right

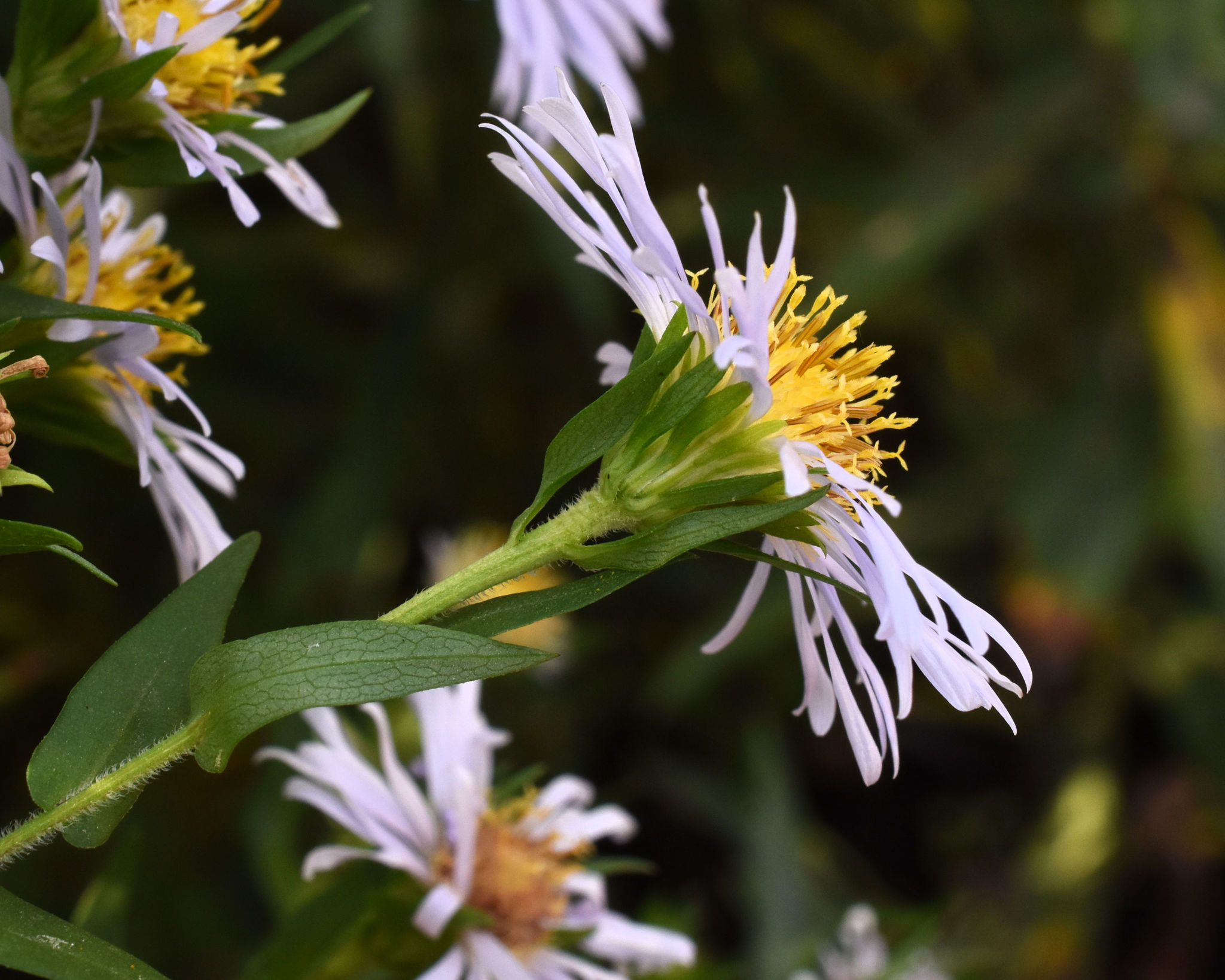
Involucre showing phyllaries and bracts

== Taxonomy ==
Symphyotrichum firmum is closely related and morphologically very similar to Symphyotrichum puniceum (purple-stemmed aster), and is not always treated as a separate species. However, there is little evidence of intergrades between the two taxa, and most sources now treat them as distinct.

== Distribution and habitat ==
Its range is poorly known due to confusion with the closely related Symphyotrichum puniceum. In Canada it has been recorded from Alberta to Quebec. In the United States, it occurs in the Midwest, some parts of the Northeast, and in the Appalachian Mountains south to Georgia. It is more common in the western part of its range.

Symphyotrichum firmum grows in moist and sunny areas such as fens and wet prairies. It is often found growing with S. puniceum. Unlike S. puniceum, it sometimes spreads into drier areas.

== Ecology ==
Bees that have been observed visiting the flowers include the bicolored striped-sweat bee (Agapostemon virescens), various bumble bees (Bombus species), small carpenter bees (Ceratina species), the sweat bee named Halictus ligatus, and Drury's long-horned bee (Melissodes druriellus). (Note: As Melissodes druriella in Wilhelm & Rericha.)

== Conservation ==
As of December 2021, NatureServe listed Symphyotrichum firmum as Secure (G5) worldwide, Vulnerable (S3) in Quebec, and Presumed Extirpated (SX) in New Jersey.
