= Golovinomyces calceolariae =

Scientific classification
- Kingdom: Fungi
- Division: Ascomycota
- Class: Leotiomycetes
- Order: Erysiphales
- Family: Erysiphaceae
- Genus: Golovinomyces
- Species: G. calceolariae

Binomial name
- Golovinomyces calceolariae Havryl., S.Takam. & V.P. Heluta, 2009

Species of fungus

Golovinomyces calceolariae is a species of powdery mildew in the family Erysiphaceae. It is found in South America, on Calceolaria and Galium species native to the region.

== Description ==
The fungus appears as very fine, fragile mycelium on the leaves of its host. Golovinomyces calceolariae, like most Erysiphaceae, is highly host-specific and infects only two genera. The species on North American Galium is Golovinomyces galiorum which is also noticeably more robust. In Europe, other species such as Golovinomyces riedlianus and Neoerysiphe galii can be found (the latter may potentially be introduced to North America).

== Taxonomy ==
The fungus was formally described in 2009 by Havrylenko, S. Takamatsu & V.P. Heluta. The specific epithet derives from the host genus of the holotype.
