= Golovinomyces monardae =

Scientific classification
- Kingdom: Fungi
- Division: Ascomycota
- Class: Leotiomycetes
- Order: Helotiales
- Family: Erysiphaceae
- Genus: Golovinomyces
- Species: G. monardae

Binomial name
- Golovinomyces monardae (G.S. Nagy) M. Scholler, U. Braun & Anke Schmidt, in Scholler, Schmidt, Siahaan, Takamatsu & Braun

Species of fungi

Golovinomyces monardae is a species of fungi in the family Erysiphaceae. This species causes powdery mildew to form.

== Description ==
Golovinomyces monardae is a type of fungus that causes powdery mildew to form.
