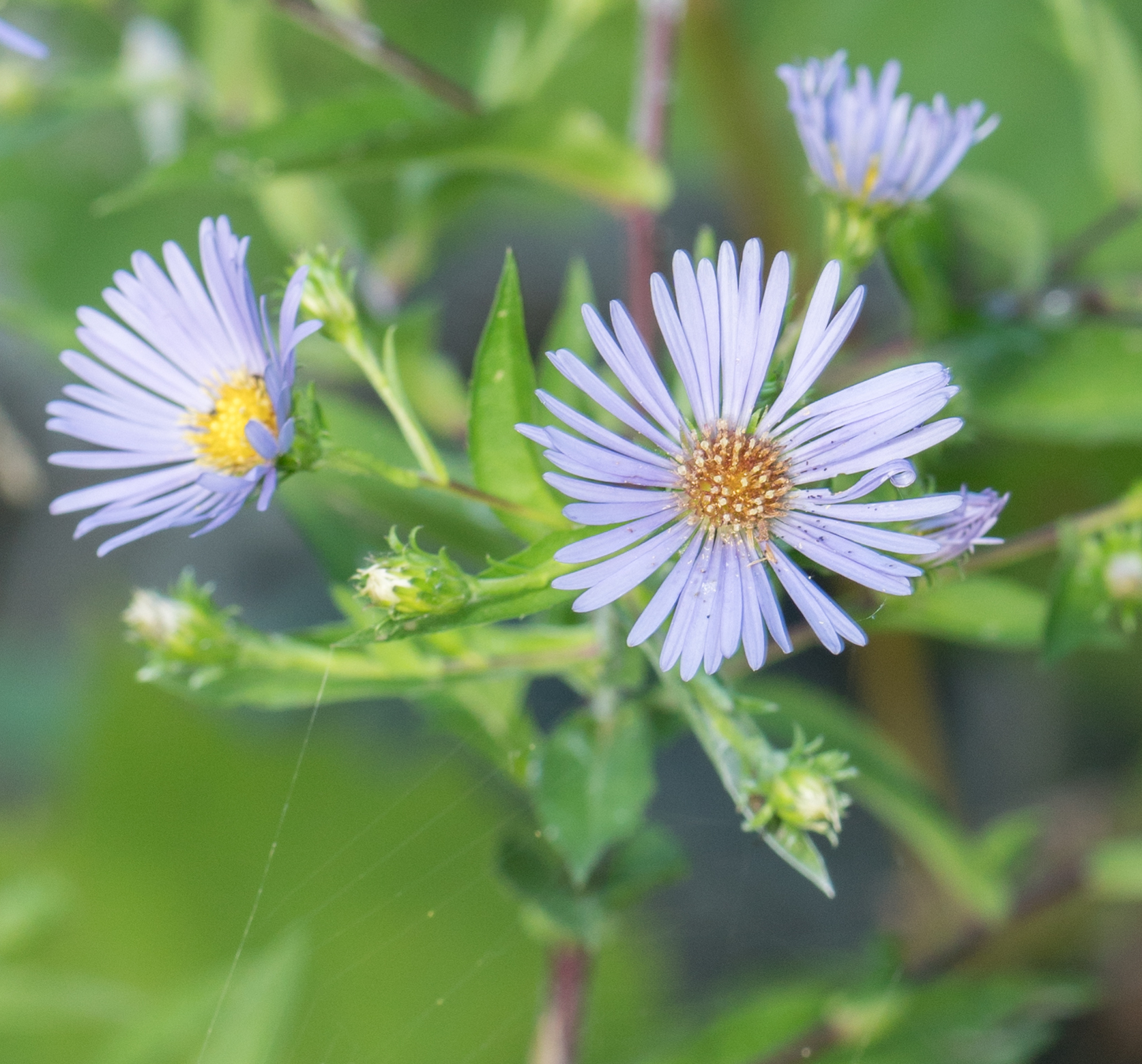
- In Beaver County, Pennsylvania

Conservation status
- Secure (NatureServe)

Scientific classification
- Kingdom: Plantae
- Clade: Tracheophytes
- Clade: Angiosperms
- Clade: Eudicots
- Clade: Asterids
- Order: Asterales
- Family: Asteraceae
- Genus: Symphyotrichum
- Subgenus: Symphyotrichum subg. Symphyotrichum
- Section: Symphyotrichum sect. Symphyotrichum
- Species: S. puniceum

Binomial name
- Symphyotrichum puniceum (L.) Á.Löve & D.Löve

Varieties
- S. puniceum var. puniceum; S. puniceum var. scabricaule (Shinners) G.L.Nesom
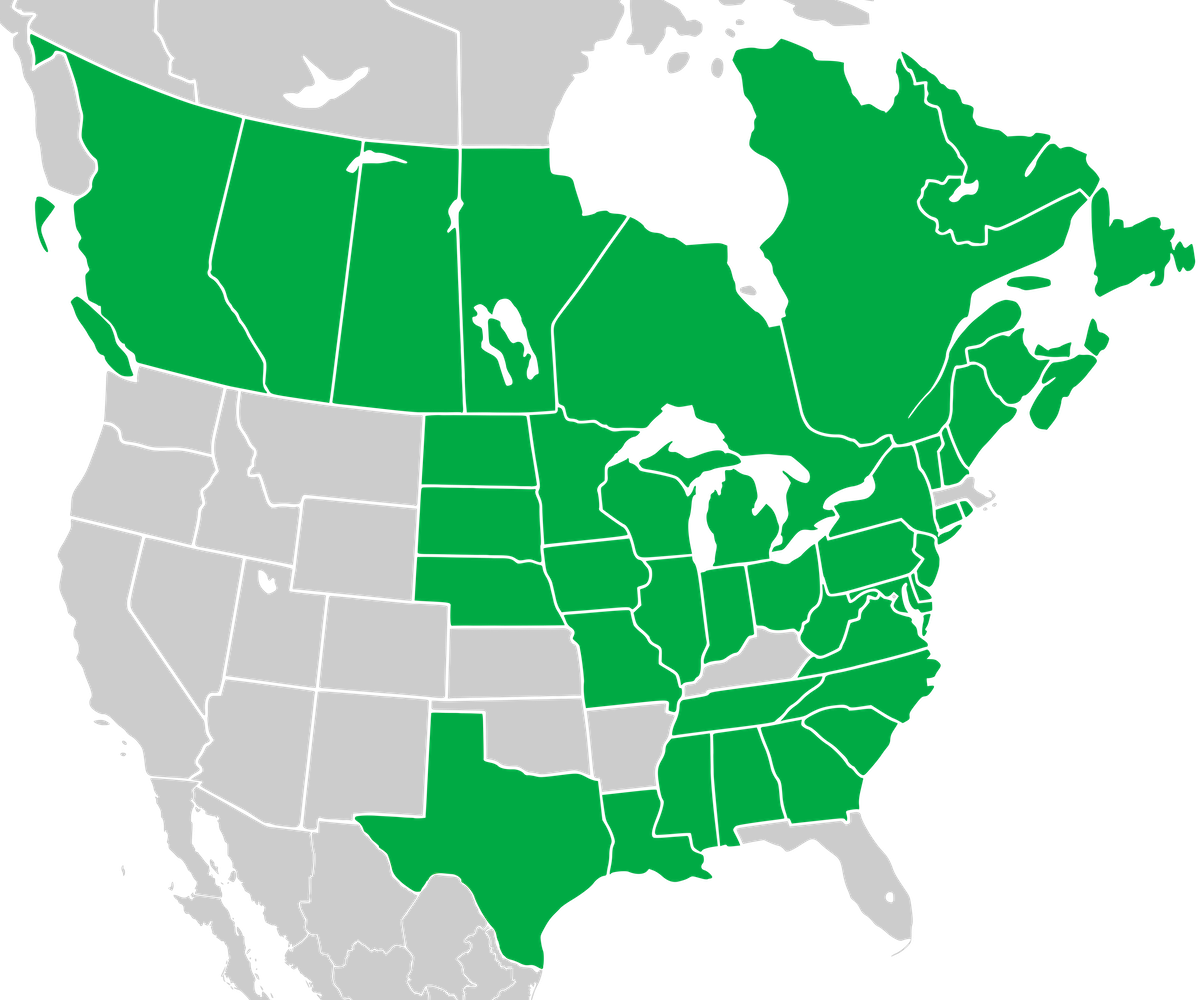
- Native distribution

Synonyms
- Basionym: Aster puniceus L.; Alphabetical list: Aster calderi B.Boivin; Aster carneus var. ambiguus Torr. & A.Gray; Aster conduplicatus E.S.Burgess; Aster demissus J.Forbes; Aster forwoodii S.Watson; Aster puniceus f. albiflorus Ralph Hoffm.; Aster puniceus f. albiligulatus Pease & A.H.Moore; Aster puniceus f. brachypyllus Lepage; Aster puniceus var. calderi Lepage; Aster puniceus var. calvus Shinners; Aster puniceus f. candidus Fernald; Aster puniceus var. colbyi Benke; Aster puniceus f. colbyi (Benke) Shinners; Aster puniceus var. compactus Fernald; Aster puniceus var. crawfordii Porter; Aster puniceus f. demissus (Lindl.) Fernald; Aster puniceus var. demissus Lindl.; Aster puniceus f. etiamalbus Venard; Aster puniceus f. glabratus Shinners; Aster puniceus var. laevicaulis A.Gray; Aster puniceus var. lancifolius Fernald; Aster puniceus var. lucidus MacMill.; Aster puniceus var. monocephalus Farw.; Aster puniceus var. oligocephalus Fernald; Aster puniceus var. perlongus Fernald; Aster puniceus var. purpureus Pursh; Aster puniceus var. rufescens Pursh; Aster puniceus f. rufescens Fassett; Aster puniceus var. vimineus Torr. & A.Gray; Symphyotrichum puniceum var. calderi (B.Boivin) G.L.Nesom; Symphyotrichum puniceum f. candidum (Fernald) G.Wilh. & Rericha

= Symphyotrichum puniceum =

Species of plant in the aster family

Symphyotrichum puniceum (formerly Aster puniceus), is a species of flowering plant in the family Asteraceae native to eastern North America. It is commonly known as purplestem aster, red-stalk aster, red-stemmed aster, red-stem aster, and swamp aster. It also has been called early purple aster, cocash, swanweed, and meadow scabish.

Its range extends from the edges of the Great Plains to the Atlantic coast, and from the Gulf coast of Texas north to southern Ungava Bay in the north of Quebec. It is adventive in Europe.

== Description ==
Symphyotrichum puniceum produces flowers between August and October. The ray florets range from dark blue or purple to white (rarely). The disc florets are yellow to cream-colored, becoming pink or purple with maturity.

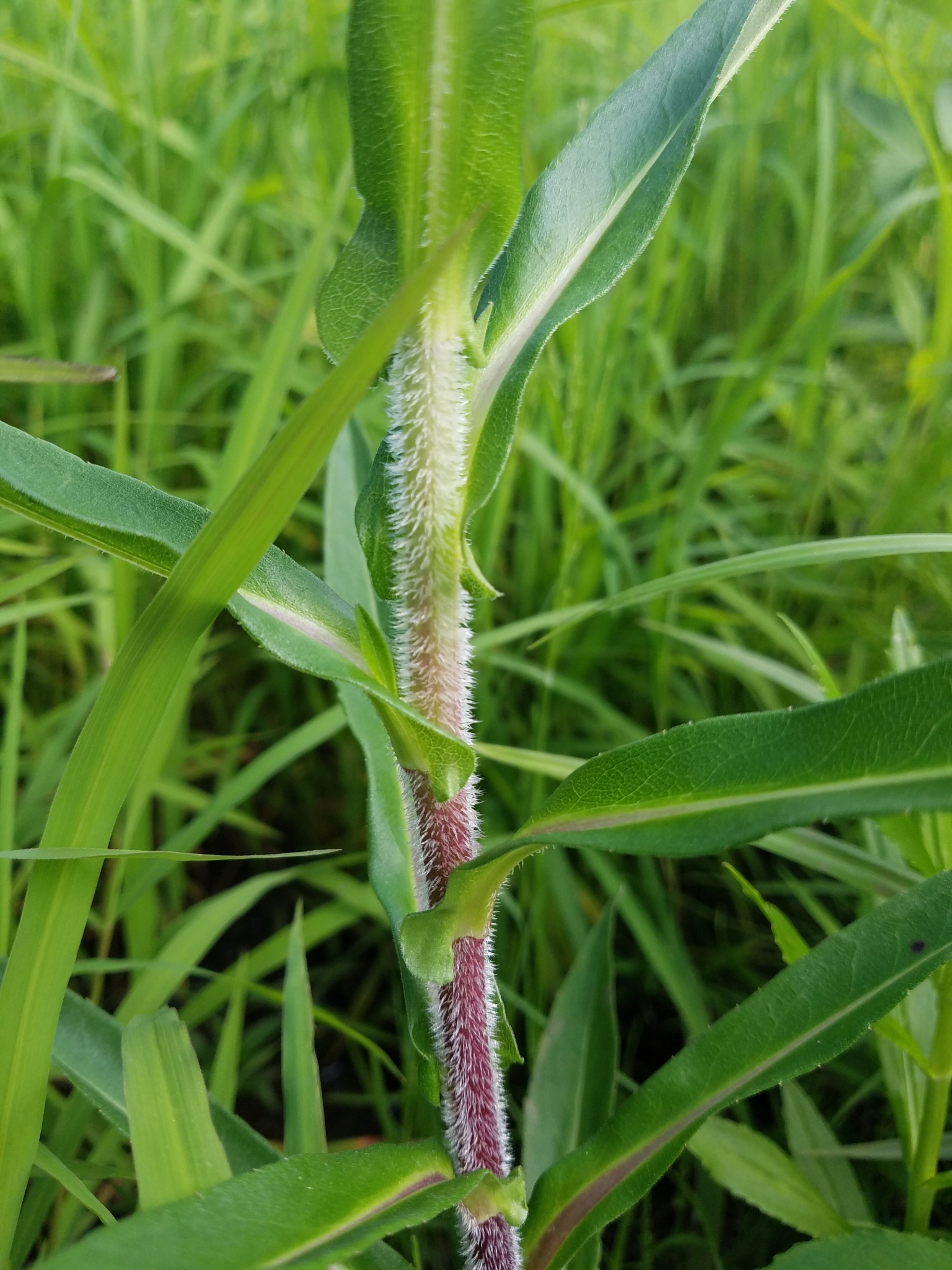
Stem and leaves

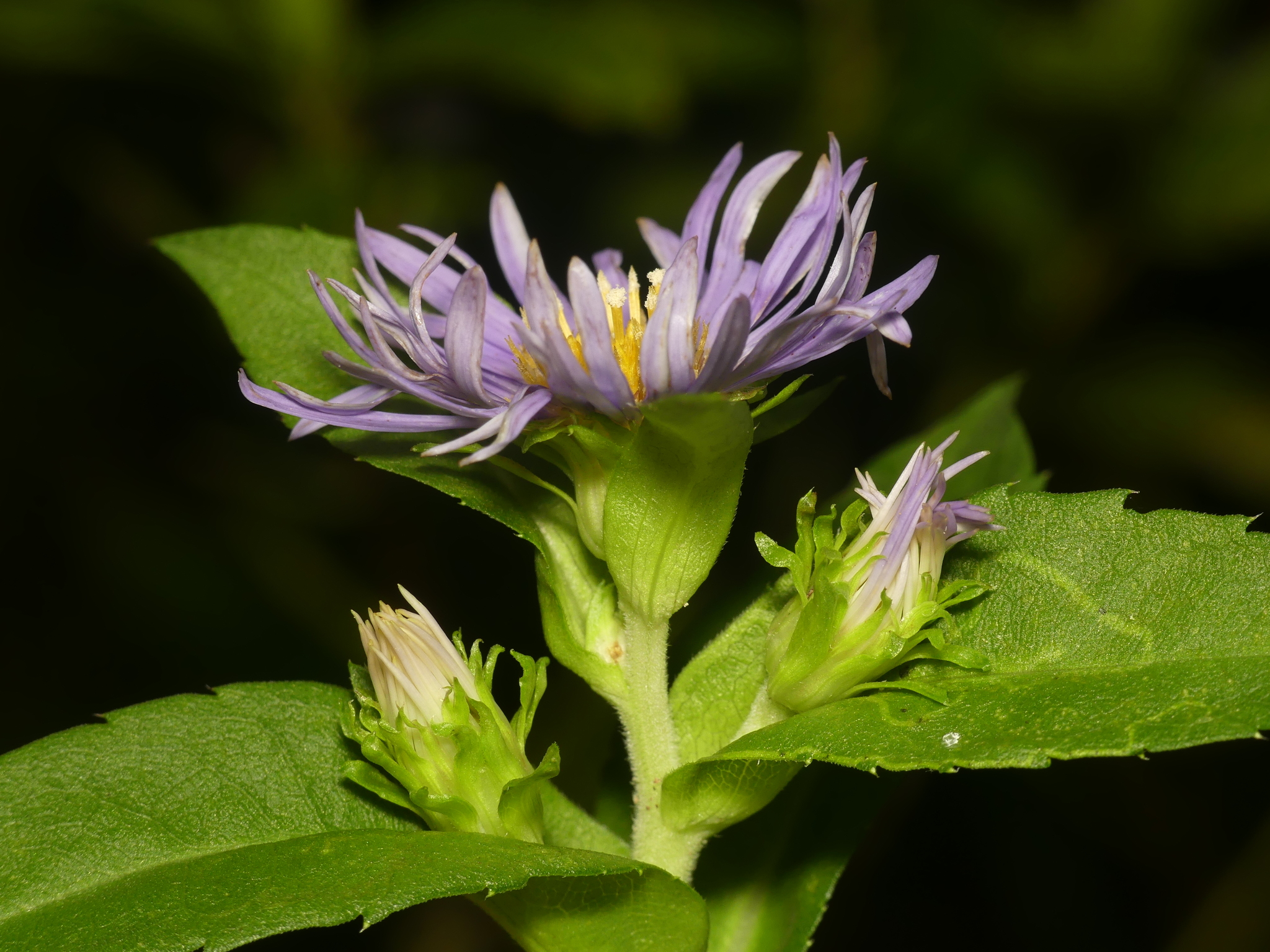
Involucre showing phyllaries and bracts

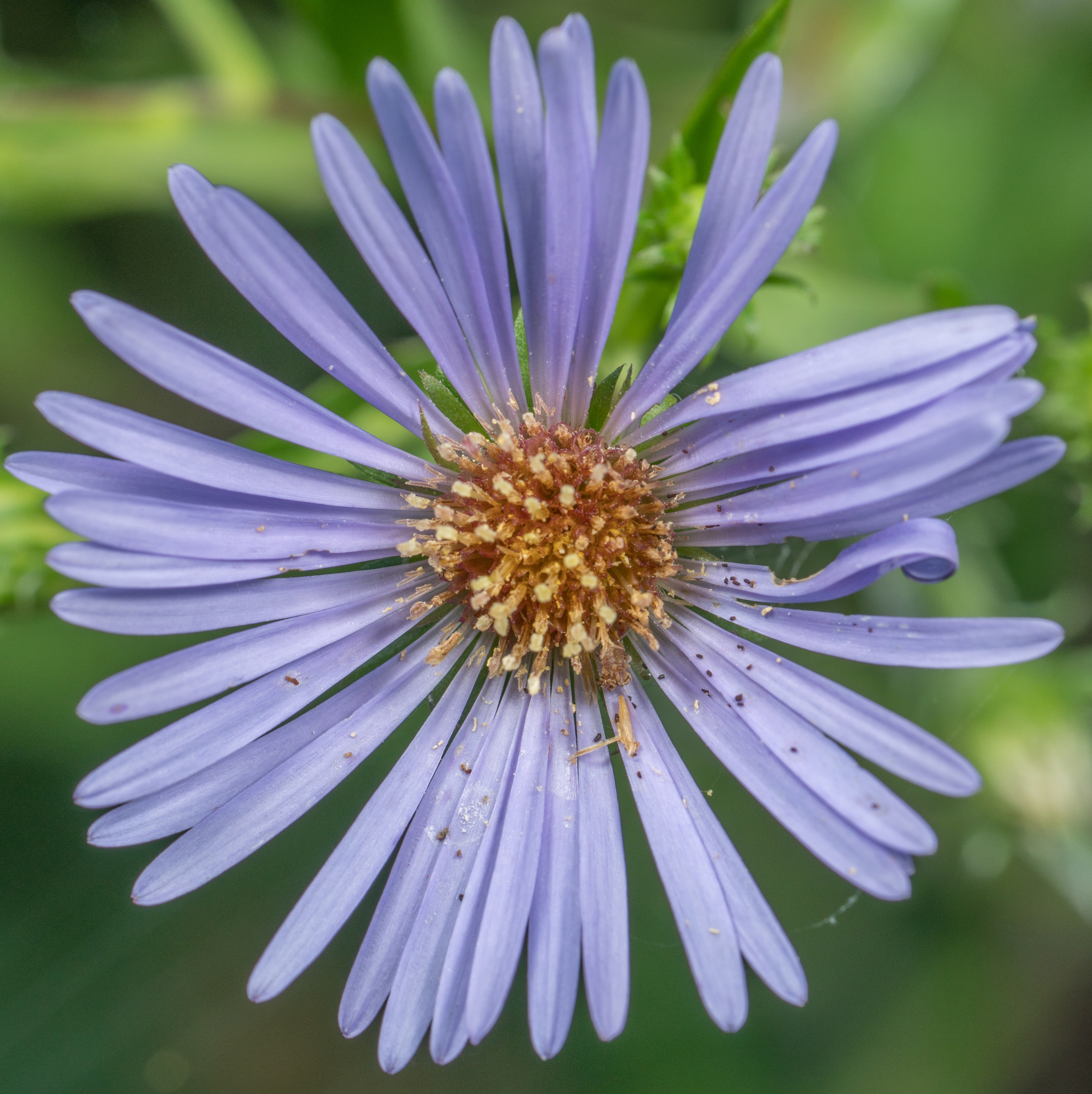
Flower head

== Taxonomy ==
Symphyotrichum puniceum is a variable species, and many forms have been named. As of July 2021, Plants of the World Online (POWO) accepts one variety in addition to the autonym. S. puniceum var. scabricaule occurs in the southern United States from Texas to Alabama. The autonym, S. puniceum var. puniceum, occurs in most of the eastern United States and southern Canada.

The species Symphyotrichum firmum is sometimes considered a variety of S. puniceum, but POWO and Flora of North America treat them as distinct species. In 1999, Calvin College botanists David P. Warners and Daniel C. Laughlin gave evidence that they should be considered two distinct species. Compared to S. firmum, Symphyotrichum puniceum is typically hairier, with purpler flowers, and does not form dense colonies but rather small clusters or scattered individuals.

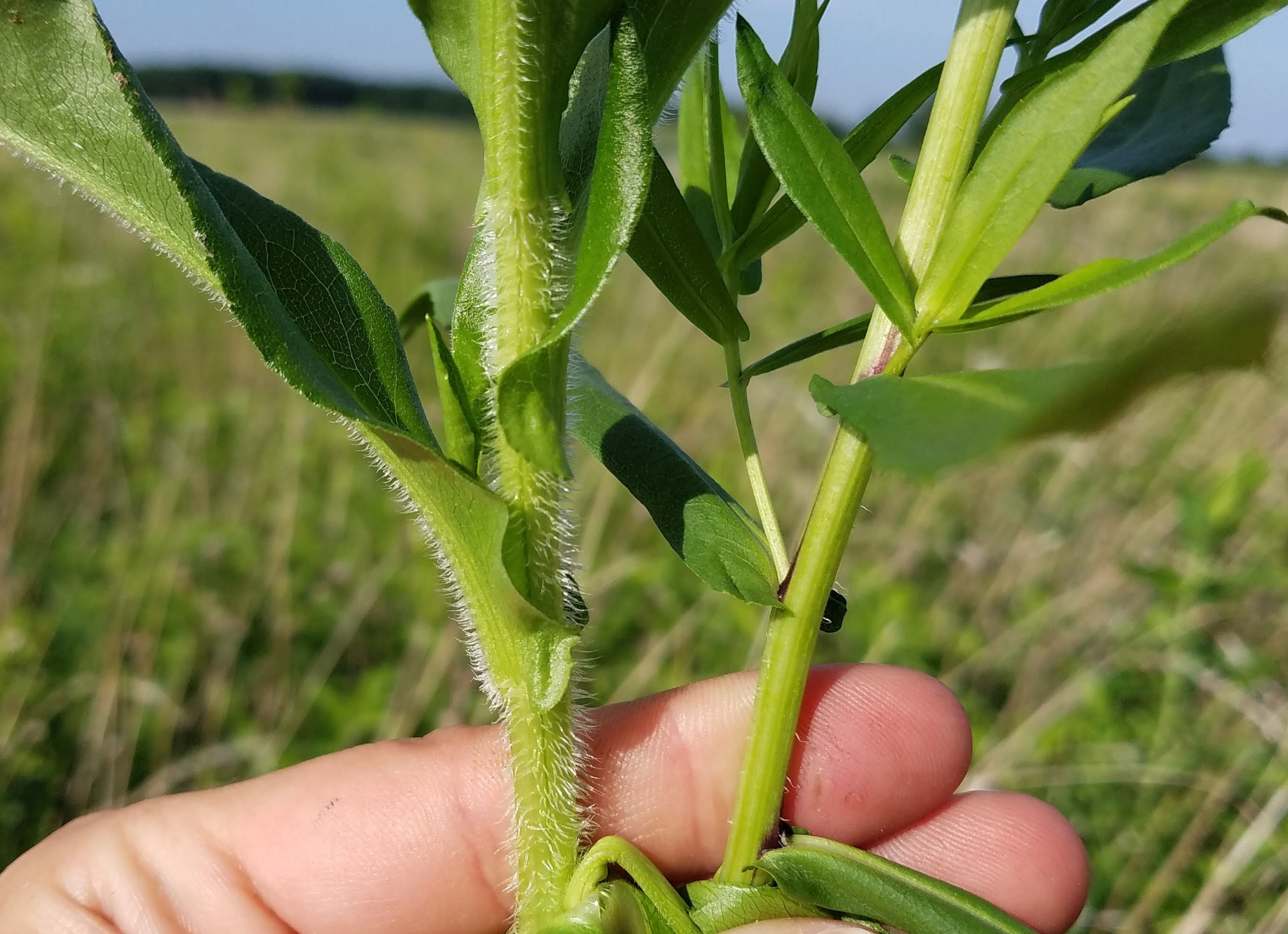
Symphyotrichum puniceum on left and S. firmum on right

Hybrids between this species and Symphyotrichum boreale have been recorded and are called Symphyotrichum × longulum.

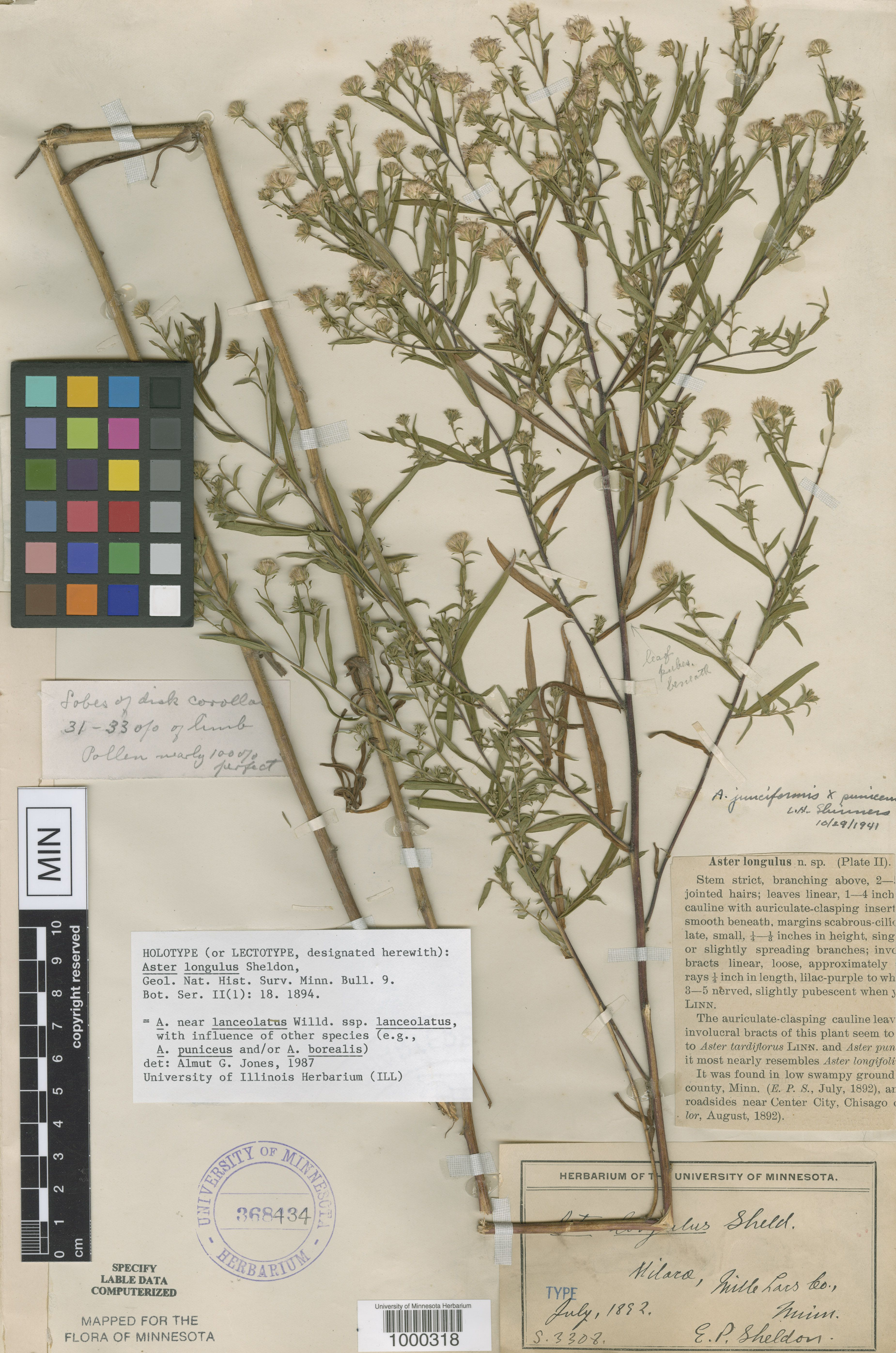
Possible holotype of Aster longulus, basionym of hybrid Symphyotrichum × longulum

== Conservation ==
As of July 2021, NatureServe listed Symphyotrichum puniceum as Secure (G5) worldwide and Critically Imperiled (S1) in Mississippi. It listed S. puniceum var. puniceum as Vulnerable (S3) in Kentucky, and S. puniceum var. scabricaule as overall an Imperiled Variety (T2) and Critically Imperiled (S1) in Texas.

== Uses ==
Symphyotrichum puniceum has been used for medicinal purposes among indigenous people in North America. It has been documented that the Chippewa have smoked the root with tobacco to attract game. Multiple uses have been reported for the Woodland Cree, including as an aid for tooth pain and for healing a woman after childbirth. The Iroquois have used the roots for healing of various ailments including colds, fevers, pneumonia, typhoid, and tuberculosis.
