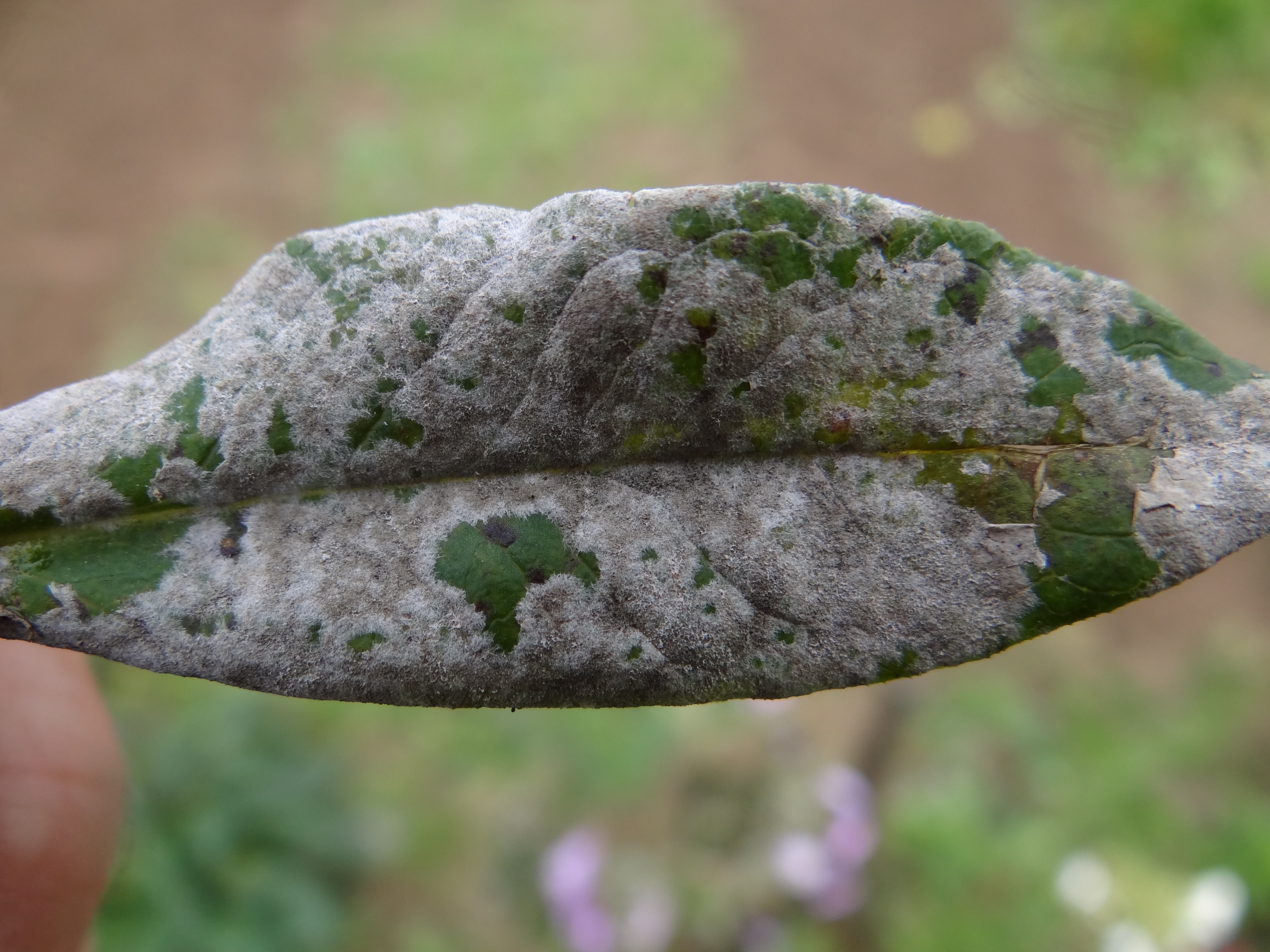
- Golovinomyces magnicellulatus on a leaf of Phlox paniculata

Scientific classification
- Kingdom: Fungi
- Division: Ascomycota
- Class: Leotiomycetes
- Order: Helotiales
- Family: Erysiphaceae
- Genus: Golovinomyces (U.Braun) V.P.Heluta (1988)

Type species
- Golovinomyces cichoracearum (DC.) V.P.Heluta (1988)

Synonyms
- Erysiphe sect. Golovinomyces U.Braun (1978); Euoidium Y.S.Paul & J.N.Kapoor (1986)

= Golovinomyces =

Genus of fungi

Golovinomyces is a genus of fungi in the family Erysiphaceae. It has 66 species. Many of the species cause powdery mildew. Golovinomyces was originally circumscribed in 1978 by Uwe Braun as a section of genus Erysiphe. It was promoted to distinct genus status in 1988.

== Species ==
- Golovinomyces adenophorae (R.Y.Zheng & G.Q.Chen) V.P.Heluta (1988)
- Golovinomyces ambrosiae (Schwein.) U.Braun & R.T.A.Cook (2009)
- Golovinomyces americanus (U.Braun) V.P.Heluta (1988)
- Golovinomyces andinus (Speg.) U.Braun (1999)
- Golovinomyces arabidis (R.Y.Zheng & G.Q.Chen) V.P.Heluta (1988)
- Golovinomyces artemisiae (Grev.) V.P.Heluta (1988)
- Golovinomyces asperifolii (Erikss.) U.Braun & H.D.Shin (2018)
- Golovinomyces asperifoliorum (Grev.) U.Braun & H.D.Shin (2018)
- Golovinomyces asterum (Schwein.) U.Braun (2012)
- Golovinomyces biocellatus (Ehrenb.) V.P.Heluta (1988)
- Golovinomyces bolayi S.Takam., Lebeda & M.Götz (2019)
- Golovinomyces brunneopunctatus (U.Braun) V.P.Heluta (1988)
- Golovinomyces calceolariae Havryl., S.Takam. & V.P.Heluta (2008)
- Golovinomyces californicus (U.Braun) V.P.Heluta (1988)
- Golovinomyces caulicola (Cif. & Bat.) U.Braun (2009)
- Golovinomyces chrysanthemi (Rabenh.) M.Bradshaw, U.Braun, Meeboon & S.Takam. (2017)
- Golovinomyces cichoracearum (DC.) V.P.Heluta (1988)
- Golovinomyces clematidis T.Z.Liu & Jing Wen (2013)
- Golovinomyces cynoglossi (Wallr.) V.P.Heluta (1988)
- Golovinomyces depressus (Wallr.) V.P.Heluta (1988)
- Golovinomyces echinopis (U.Braun) V.P.Heluta (1988)
- Golovinomyces euphorbiicola (Havryl.) U.Braun & Havryl. (2012)
- Golovinomyces fischeri (S.Blumer) U.Braun & R.T.A.Cook (2009)
- Golovinomyces franseriae U.Braun (2012)
- Golovinomyces glandulariae L.Kiss & Vaghefi (2019)
- Golovinomyces greeneanus (U.Braun) V.P.Heluta (1988)
- Golovinomyces hydrophyllacearum (U.Braun) V.P.Heluta (1988)
- Golovinomyces hyoscyami (R.Y.Zheng & G.Q.Chen) V.P.Heluta (1988)
- Golovinomyces immersus (U.Braun) V.P.Heluta (1988)
- Golovinomyces inulae U.Braun & H.D.Shin (2012)
- Golovinomyces laporteae (U.Braun) V.P.Heluta (1988)
- Golovinomyces latisporus (U.Braun) P.L.Qiu & S.Y.Liu (2020)
- Golovinomyces longipes (Noordel. & Loer.) L.Kiss (2019)
- Golovinomyces lycopersici (Cooke & Massee) L.Kiss (2019)
- Golovinomyces macrocarpus (Speer) U.Braun (2012)
- Golovinomyces magnicellulatus (U.Braun) V.P.Heluta (1988)
- Golovinomyces monardae (G.S.Nagy) M.Scholler, U.Braun & Anke Schmidt (2016)
- Golovinomyces montagnei U.Braun (2012)
- Golovinomyces neosalviae M.Scholler, U.Braun & Anke Schmidt (2016)
- Golovinomyces ocimi (S.Naray. & K.Ramakr.) Meeboon & S.Takam. (2017)
- Golovinomyces orontii (Castagne) V.P.Heluta (1988)
- Golovinomyces poonaensis (Kamat) U.Braun (2012)
- Golovinomyces prenanthis U.Braun (2012)
- Golovinomyces pseudosepultus (U.Braun) V.P.Heluta (1988)
- Golovinomyces riedlianus (Speer) V.P.Heluta (1988)
- Golovinomyces robustus (R.Y.Zheng & G.Q.Chen) T.Z.Liu (2010)
- Golovinomyces rogersonii U.Braun (2006)
- Golovinomyces rubiae (H.D.Shin & Y.J.La) U.Braun (1999)
- Golovinomyces salviae (Jacz.) M.Scholler, U.Braun & Anke Schmidt (2016)
- Golovinomyces senecionis U.Braun (2012)
- Golovinomyces simplex (V.P.Heluta) V.P.Heluta (1988)
- Golovinomyces sonchicola U.Braun & R.T.A.Cook (2009)
- Golovinomyces sordidus (L.Junell) V.P.Heluta (1988)
- Golovinomyces spadiceus (Berk. & M.A.Curtis) U.Braun (2012)
- Golovinomyces sparsus (U.Braun) V.P.Heluta (1988)
- Golovinomyces tabaci (Sawada) H.D.Shin, S.Takam. & L.Kiss (2019)
- Golovinomyces valerianae (Jacz.) V.P.Heluta (1988)
- Golovinomyces verbasci (Jacz.) V.P.Heluta (1988)
- Golovinomyces verbenae (Schwein.) V.P.Heluta (1988)
- Golovinomyces vincae U.Braun & S.Takam. (2019)
