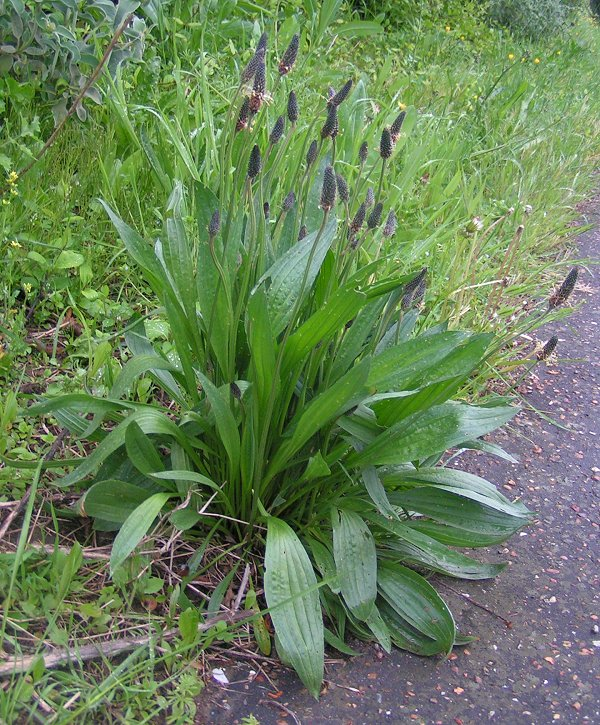

Conservation status
- Least Concern (IUCN 3.1) (Europe regional assessment)

- Secure (NatureServe)

Scientific classification
- Kingdom: Plantae
- Clade: Tracheophytes
- Clade: Angiosperms
- Clade: Eudicots
- Clade: Asterids
- Order: Lamiales
- Family: Plantaginaceae
- Genus: Plantago
- Species: P. lanceolata

Binomial name
- Plantago lanceolata L.

= Plantago lanceolata =

Ribwort plantain

Species of flowering plant in the plantain family

Plantago lanceolata is a species of flowering plant in the plantain family Plantaginaceae. It is known by the common names ribwort plantain, narrowleaf plantain, English plantain, ribleaf, lamb's tongue, and buckhorn. It is a common weed on cultivated or disturbed land.

== Description ==
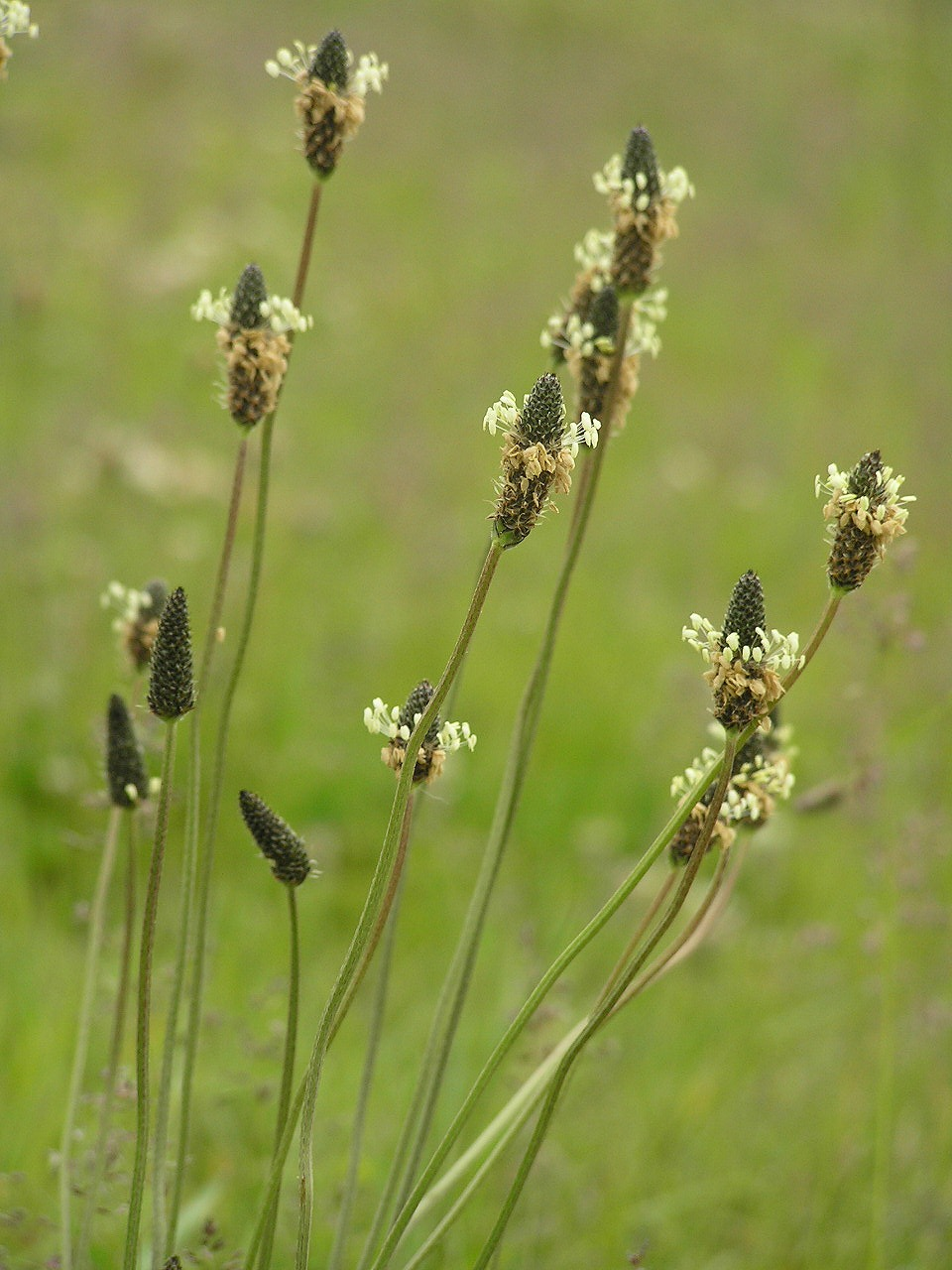
P. lanceolata (Japan)

The plant is a rosette-forming perennial herb, with leafless, silky, hairy flower stems, growing to 45 centimetres (17 1/2 in) tall, exceptionally 100 cm (39 in). The basal leaves are lanceolate spreading or erect, scarcely toothed with 3–5 strong parallel veins narrowed to a short petiole. The flower stalk is deeply furrowed, ending in an ovoid inflorescence of many small flowers each with a pointed bract. Each inflorescence can produce up to 200 seeds. Flowers are 4 millimetres (1/8 in), with a green calyx and brownish corolla, four bent-back lobes with brown midribs and long white stamens.

=== Reproduction ===
The mode of reproduction can vary among populations. Reproduction occurs sexually, with the pollen being wind dispersed for the most part, though the plant is occasionally pollinated by bees.

=== Chemistry ===
Plantago lanceolata contains phenylethanoids such as acteoside (verbascoside), cistanoside F, lavandulifolioside, plantamajoside and isoacteoside. It also contains the iridoid glycosides aucubin and catalpol.

== Distribution and habitat ==
Plantago lanceolata is native to Europe and western Asia and is common across this range, including in Britain. It is widespread throughout the British Isles, but scarce on the most acidic soils (pH < 4.5). It has been introduced elsewhere in the world, including North America, Oceania and Japan at least 200 years ago and South Africa and Chile 150 years ago.

Considered to be an indicator of agriculture in pollen diagrams, P. lanceolata has been found in western Norway from the Early Neolithic onwards, which is considered an indicator of grazing in that area at the time.

The species can live anywhere from very dry meadows to places similar to a rain forest, but it does best in open, disturbed areas. It is therefore common near roadsides where other plants cannot flourish; It grows tall if it can do so, but in frequently mown areas it adopts a flat growth habit instead. Historically the plant has thrived in areas where ungulates graze and turn up the earth with their hooves.

=== Invasiveness ===
The ribwort plantain is considered an invasive species across the United States and Australia. Accidentally introduced to the former in 1822, it has since spread throughout the country, especially in disturbed habitats such as lawns (surviving even when mown), meadows and roadsides. While generally not toxic to livestock, it can be unpalatable and reduce the quality of pasture for grazing animals. In addition, in areas where it thrives, ribwort can contribute to respiratory issues such as hay fever owing to its pollen and wind-born nature.

One of the plant's most notable traits is its ability to remain in a quiescent 'lag period' between introduction to an area and rapid expansion. Ribwort's lag period between its initial introduction to the US and manifestation as a noxious invasive was 177 years. This ability allows the plant to remain unnoticed for long periods, before suddenly expanding and becoming problematic. The plant is now considered a noxious weed in states such as Iowa and Michigan, and its spread continues to affect local flora and fauna. Ribwort's long lag period makes it a particularly tricky invader, as it can seem to emerge suddenly and expand rapidly when conditions become more favorable, contributing to its success as a persistent and disruptive species.

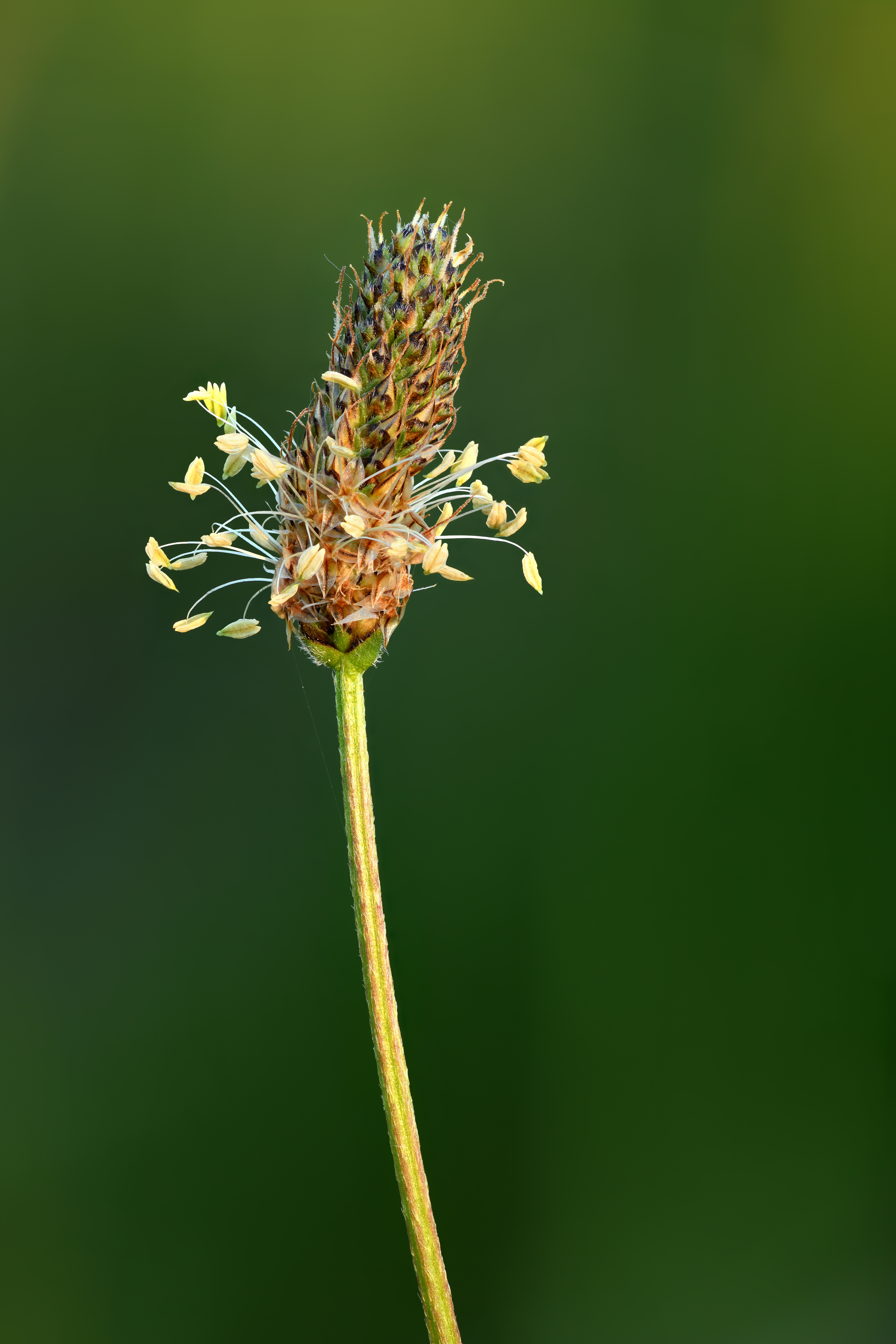
Inflorescence

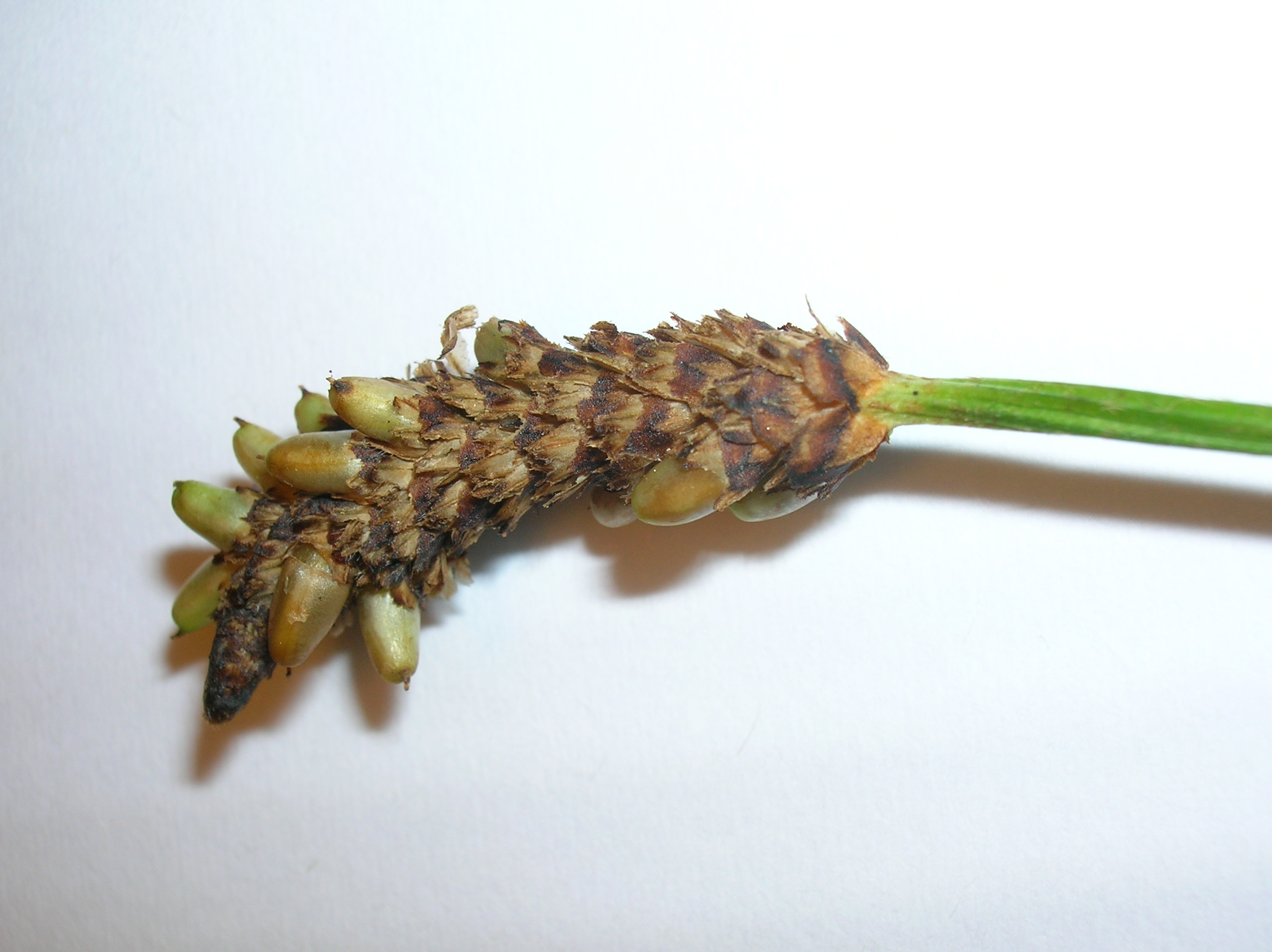
Infructescence

== Ecology ==
Songbirds eat the seeds, and the leaves are eaten by rabbits.

The iridoid glycosides the plant contains make it inedible to some herbivores, but others are unperturbed by them—for example, the buckeye butterfly Junonia coenia, whose larvae eat the leaves of P. lanceolata and ingest the iridoid glycosides to make themselves unpalatable to predators.

=== Insect predation ===
Plantago lanceolata is host to many different species of the order Lepidoptera. Species such as Junonia coenia, Spilosoma congrua, and Melitaea cinxia lay their eggs on P. lanceolata plants so they can serve as a food source for the larvae when they hatch. The iridoid glycosides in the plant leaves accumulate in the caterpillars and make them unpalatable to predators.

=== Infection by powdery mildew ===
Podosphaera plantaginis is a powdery mildew fungus that infects P. lanceolata. All of the P. lanceolata populations are infected by several strains of this powdery mildew fungus. Once the populations are infected, the symptoms are minimal at first. Then, after a few weeks or months lesions start to appear covering the entire surface of the leaves and the stem, making it very noticeable. Another species that infects P. lanceolata is Golovinomyces sordidus. Both of these mildews are obligate biotrophs, meaning that they can only infect living tissue. They cover the surface of the leaves and extend hyphae into the cell matrix in order to extract nutrients.

==== Resistance to powdery mildew ====
After the populations are infected, they react in different ways. Some populations of P. lanceolata are more susceptible to different strains of powdery mildew. Also, some populations have multiple resistance phenotypes, where on the other hand, others may only have one resistance phenotype. Overall, the populations that have the highest variety of resistance phenotypes will have the highest survival rates particularly when rates of infection are high.

== Uses ==
Plantago lanceolata is used frequently in herbal teas and other herbal remedies. A tea from the leaves is used as a cough medicine. In traditional Austrian medicine, the leaves have been used internally (as syrup or tea) or externally (fresh leaves) for treatment of disorders of the respiratory tract, skin, insect bites, and infections. The leaves can be eaten when very young. The flower buds have a mushroom-like flavour and can be used to make stock.

100g of fresh leaves provides 21.989 kcal from 2.12 g protein, 2.81 g net carbohydrates and 0.33 g fat. They are high in fiber with 3.71 g fiber per 100g.

It can also be simmered in water to make a natural dye for use in textiles.

== In culture ==
Children use the plant in a game where the flower's head is shot off the end of the stalk; it has been called "rifle", "1 o'clock gun" (after the gun that fires every day from Edinburgh Castle), and other names. To play the game, one would pluck a stalk and wrap a loop of the distal end of the stem around the section of stem closest to the flowerhead. The loop is tightened so it stops up behind the flowerhead and the stem is pulled backward until the flowerhead pops off. The stalk is slightly elastic so when the flowerhead separates it flies off in the direction in which the stalk is pointed like a gun, hence the gun-related names given to it.

In the West Country of England, the same game is called 'cannonballs'. Another game played with the plant in Britain and Ireland is a variation of conkers: a child tries to knock off the flowerhead of their friendly rival's stalk using their own stalk with a fast downward thrust. This pastime is known vernacularly as 'dongers' in Kent and 'Carl doddies' (along with the plant itself) in Scotland.
