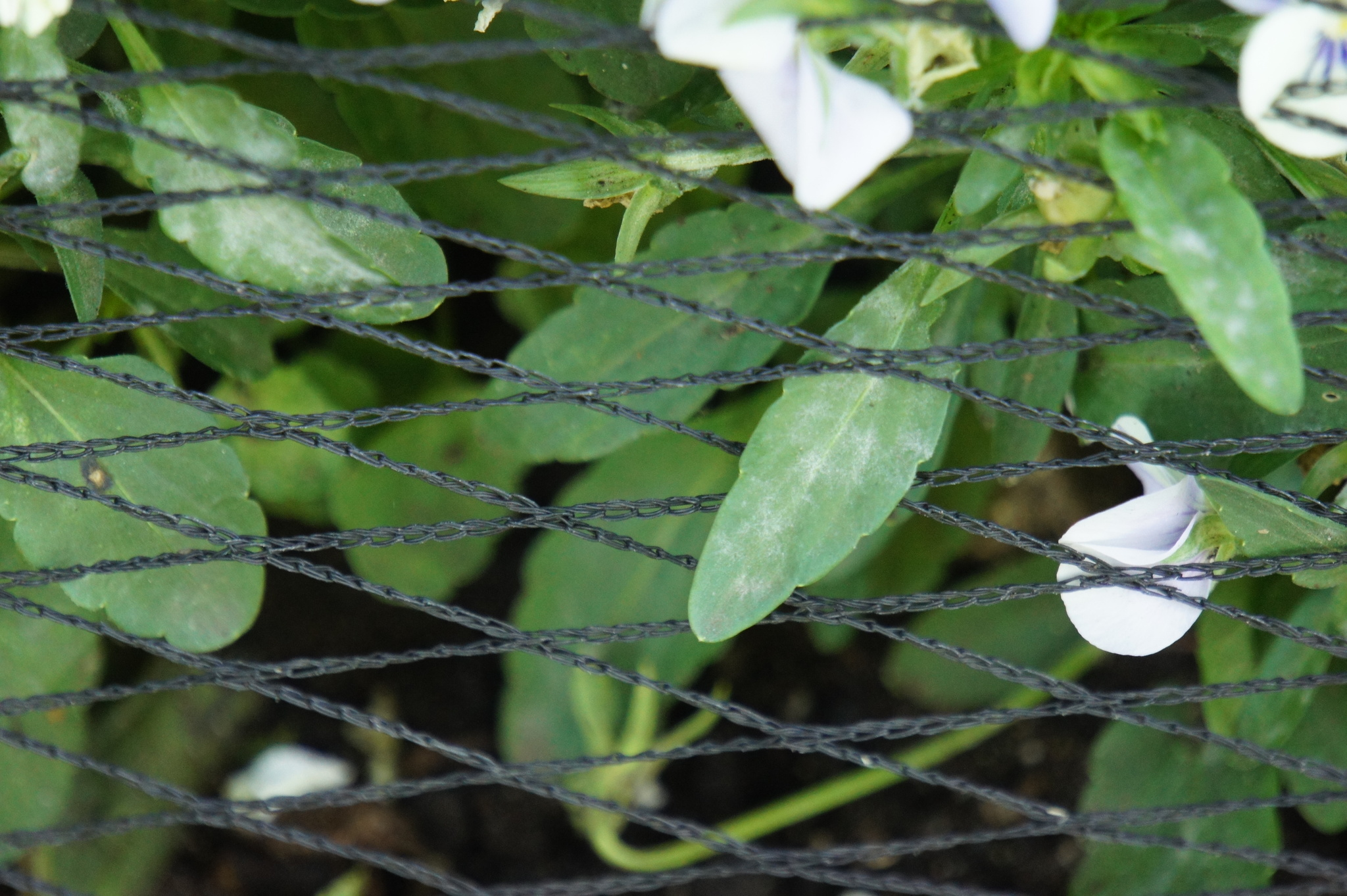
- Golovinomyces orontii on Viola in the UK.

Scientific classification
- Kingdom: Fungi
- Division: Ascomycota
- Class: Leotiomycetes
- Order: Helotiales
- Family: Erysiphaceae
- Genus: Golovinomyces
- Species: G. orontii

Binomial name
- Golovinomyces orontii (Castagne) Heluta, 1988

Synonyms
- Erysiphe orontii Castagne, 1851

= Golovinomyces orontii =

Species of fungus

Golovinomyces orontii is a species complex of powdery mildew fungi in the family Erysiphaceae. It is found around the world where it infects plants in various families. What was formerly thought to be a single species is likely to be a complex of multiple cryptic species, with Golovinomyces orontii sensu stricto infecting plants such as Misopates.

== Description ==
The fungus forms white mycelial growth on both sides of the leaves of its host. The leaves can sometimes be distorted, discoloured or even killed by the presence of the powdery mildew. Unlike most Erysiphaceae, Golovinomyces orontii has been considered not to be particularly host-specific, occurring on a wide range of taxa. However, it is more likely that what has been reported as a single species is actually multiple closely-related taxa. The type host of Golovinomyces orontii is Misopates. It can be found worldwide, wherever its host species are found.

== Taxonomy ==
Golovinomyces orontii was formally described by Castagne in 1851 with the basionym Erysiphe orontii. The species was transferred to the genus Golovinomyces by V.P. Heluta in 1988.

== Lifecycle ==
The lifecycle begins when a conidia lands on the surface of a host plant. The conidia then develop germ tubes, forming an appressorium, that later forms into haustoria. These haustoria are used to siphon nutrients needed for growth.

Golovinomyces orontii completes a full life cycle within a few days. The fungus produces new conidia asexually, which are easily dispersed to nearby susceptible plants. These conidia can initiate new infections, leading to the spread of the disease.

Chasmothecia are rarely formed on most hosts, but may form under unfavourable conditions. Chasmothecia are resistant structures that protect the sexual spores (ascospores) of the fungus. They can remain viable for extended periods and serve as a means of survival until conditions become favourable again.
