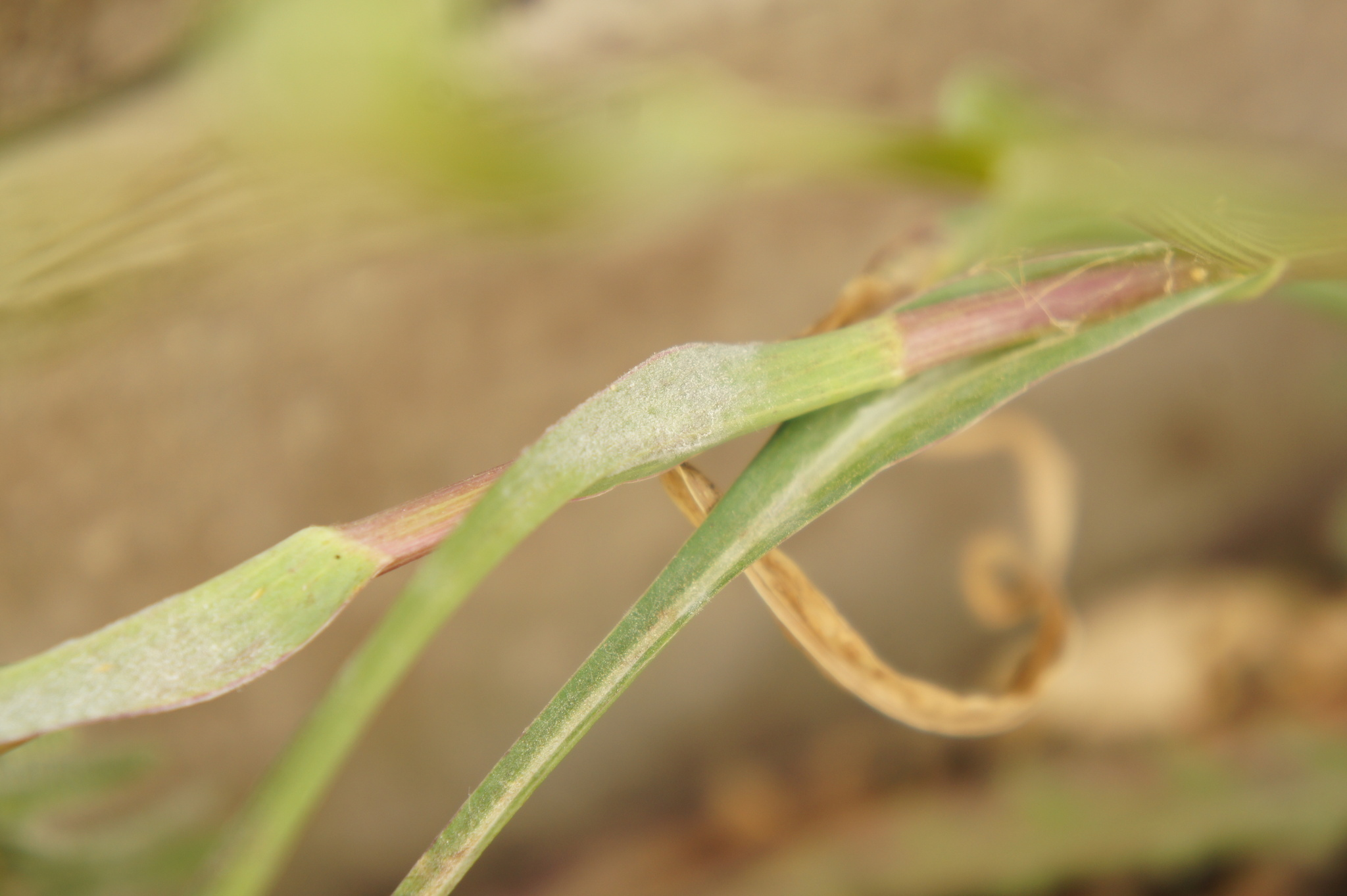
- Golovinomyces cichoracearum on Tragopogon pratensis

Scientific classification
- Kingdom: Fungi
- Division: Ascomycota
- Class: Leotiomycetes
- Order: Helotiales
- Family: Erysiphaceae
- Genus: Golovinomyces
- Species: G. cichoracearum

Binomial name
- Golovinomyces cichoracearum (DC.), 1805

Synonyms
- Golovinomyces cichoracearum var. cichoracearum (DC.) V.P. Heluta, 1988; Erysiphe communis var. cichoracearum (DC.) Fr., 1824

= Golovinomyces cichoracearum =

Species of fungus

Golovinomyces cichoracearum is a species of powdery mildew in the family Erysiphaceae. It is found in North America and Eurasia, where it affects salsifies (Tragopogon) and snakeweeds (Scorzonera).

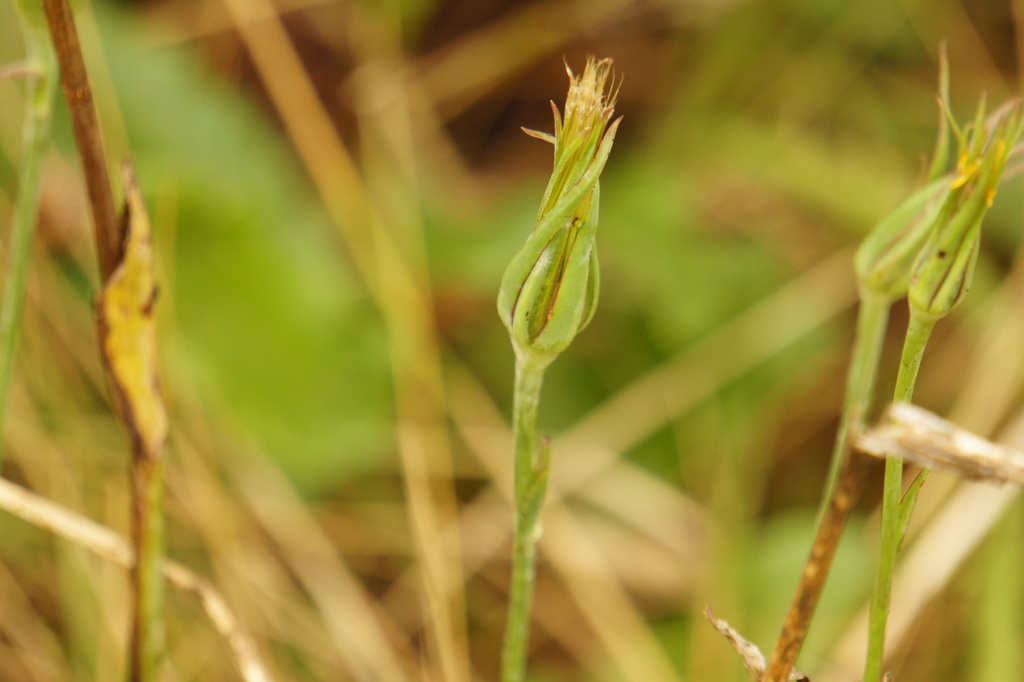
Golovinomyces cichoracearum can be found on stems, leaves, and (as seen here) on the bracts.

== Description ==
The fungus forms thin, white irregular patches on the leaves, stems and bracts of its host. Despite formerly being thought to infect a vast array of distantly related plants, Golovinomyces cichoracearum, like most Erysiphaceae, is highly host-specific and infects only two genera. It is also likely to infect Pseudopodospermum and Scorzoneroides, although infections on these hosts are unconfirmed.

== Taxonomy ==
The fungus was formally described in 1805 by de Candolle.
