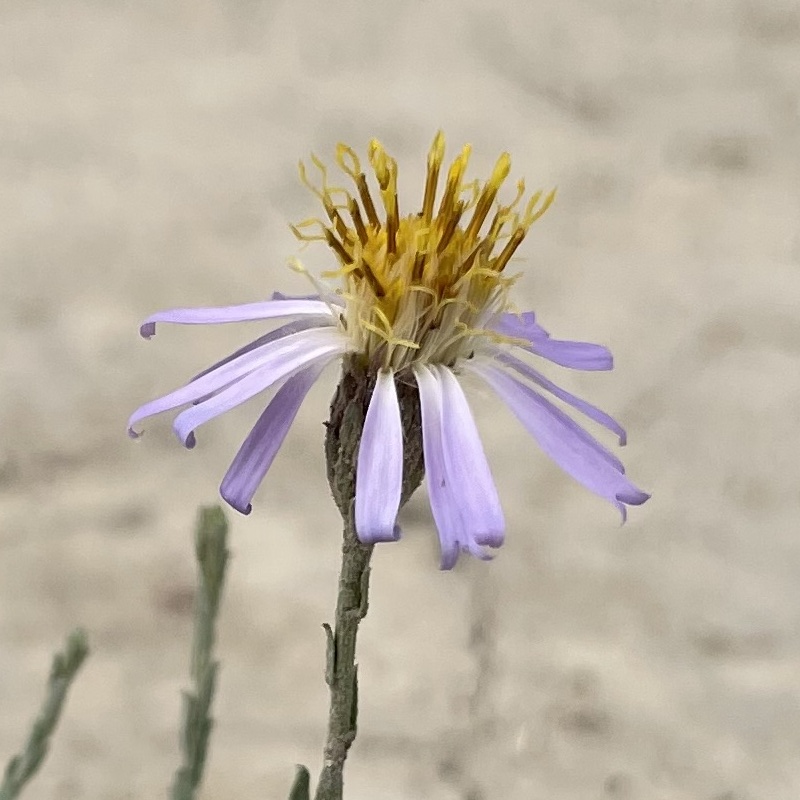
- Sanrobertia gypsophila near Galeana, Nuevo León, Mexico

Scientific classification
- Kingdom: Plantae
- Clade: Embryophytes
- Clade: Tracheophytes
- Clade: Angiosperms
- Clade: Eudicots
- Clade: Asterids
- Order: Asterales
- Family: Asteraceae
- Subfamily: Asteroideae
- Tribe: Astereae
- Subtribe: Symphyotrichinae
- Genus: Sanrobertia; G.L.Nesom
- Species: S. gypsophila

Binomial name
- Sanrobertia gypsophila (B.L.Turner) G.L.Nesom

Synonyms
- Aster gypsophilus B.L.Turner; Symphyotrichum gypsophilum (B.L.Turner) G.L.Nesom

= Sanrobertia =

Monotypic genus of flowering plants

Sanrobertia is a genus of flowering plants within the subtribe Symphyotrichinae of the family Asteraceae. It is monotypic, meaning there is only one species within the genus. Sanrobertia gypsophila is a rare endemic known only from Nuevo León, Mexico.

== Description ==
Sanrobertia gypsophila is a perennial, herbaceous plant that blooms with lilac rays and yellow disk centers during the months of August through October. It grows from a slender and woody rhizome, with blue-green stems that reach heights between about 4 and 20 cm (2 and 8 in). The plant has either tiny glands on tiny stalks called stipitate glands or it may have glands without stalks. These glands are on the upper stems, leaves, and phyllaries. Most of the plant may be slightly strigose with very short (0.1–0.5 millimeters (Note: To convert millimeters to inches, divide the number of millimeters by exactly 25.4.)), appressed, white, and pointed hairs.

=== Leaves ===
Numerous alternate and simple blue-green leaves grow on the stems and branches, and they are usually somewhat clasping at their bases. Their margins (edges) are smooth, shapes are mostly oblong-lanceolate, and tips are curved slightly outward and covered with a few tiny spines. The single-nerved leaves are without a stalk (known as sessile) and are small, ranging in lengths from 4 to 7 mm and widths from 1 to 2 mm, being generally even in size and distribution along the stems.

=== Flowers ===
The flower heads of Sanrobertia gypsophila consist of 12–16 lilac ray florets, each about 5–6 mm long and 0.8–1.2 mm wide. These surround a disk of yellow florets.

=== Chromosomes ===
Sanrobertia gypsophila has a monoploid number (also called base number) of nine chromosomes (x = 9). The species is diploid with a total chromosome count of 18.

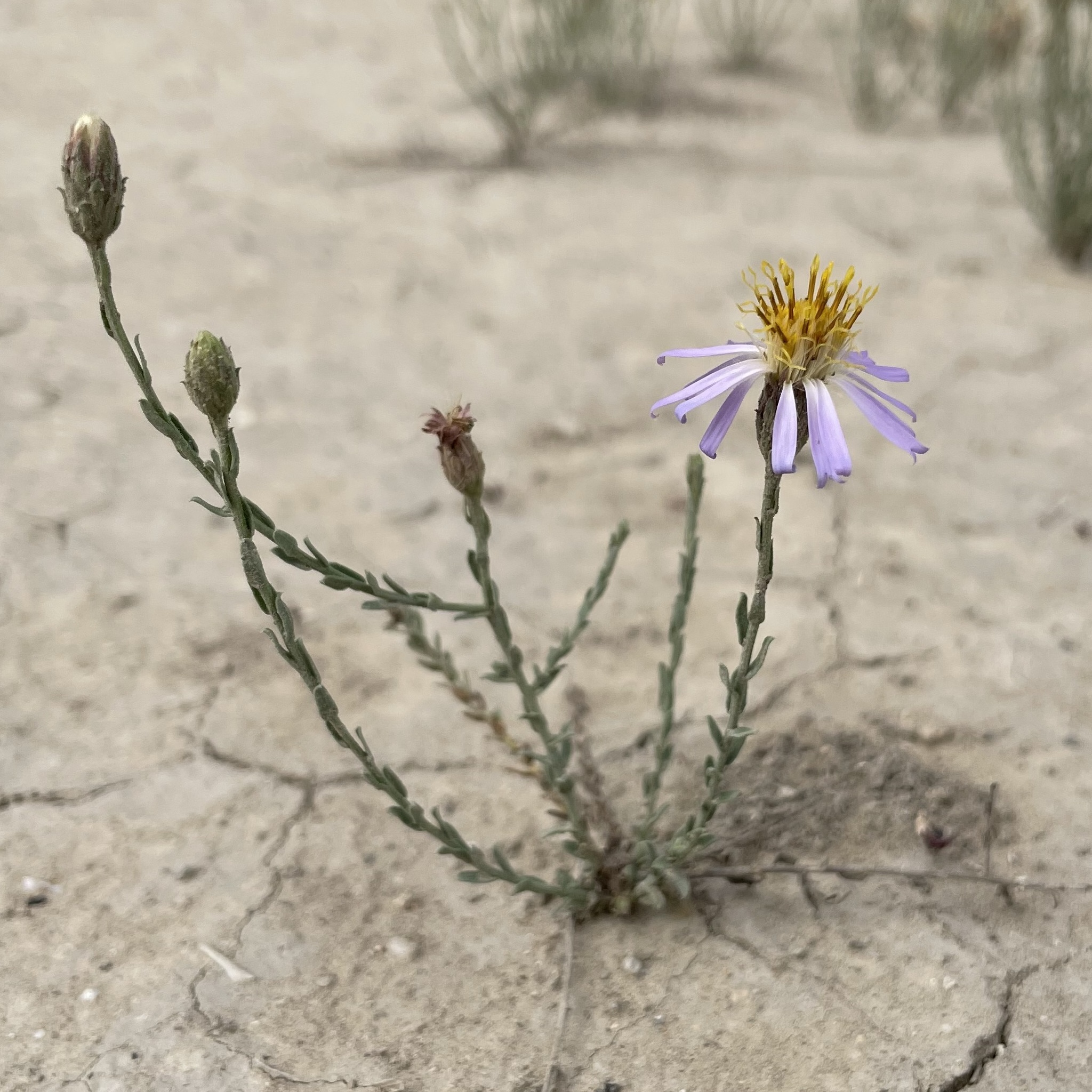
S. gypsophila plant

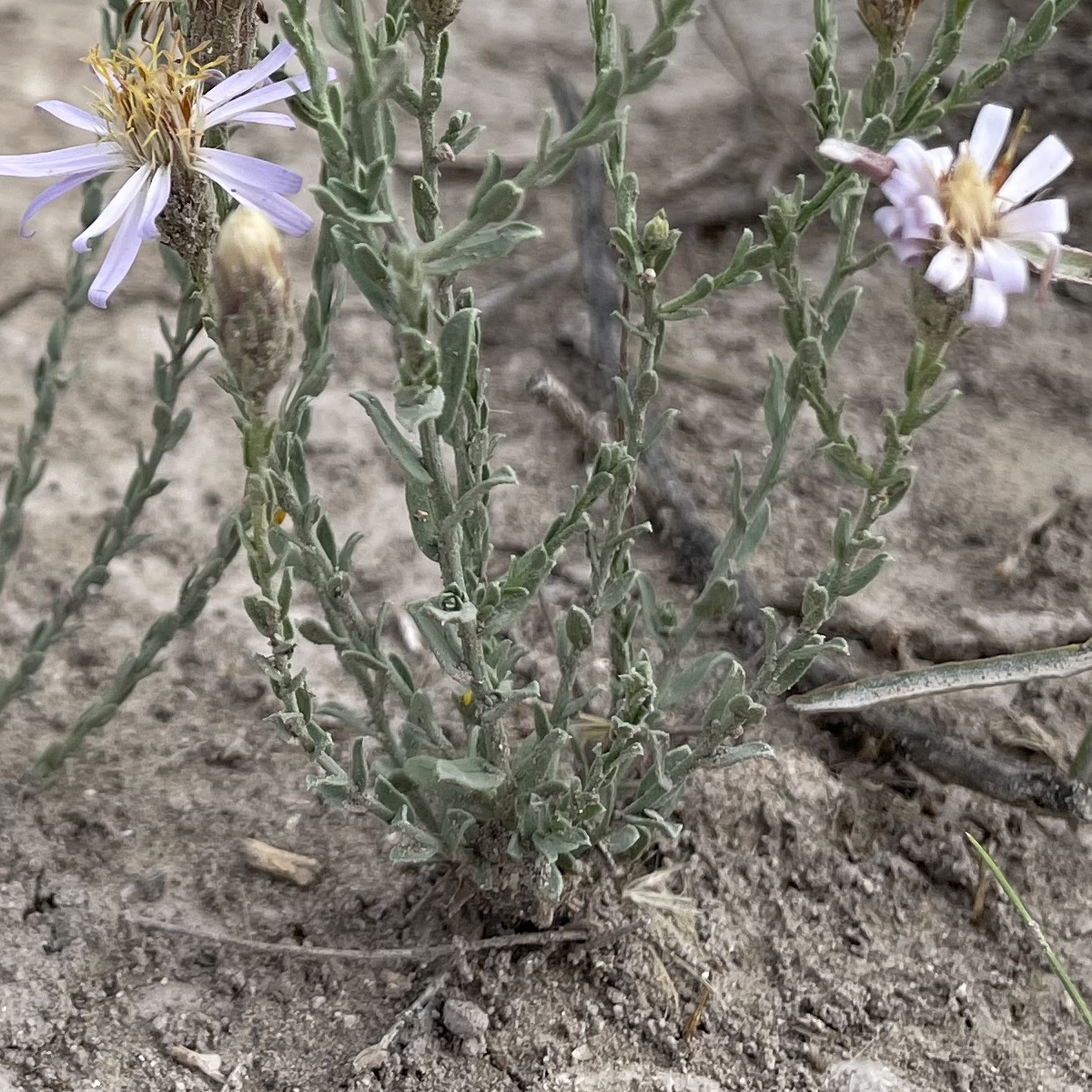
S. gypsophila base, stems, and leaves

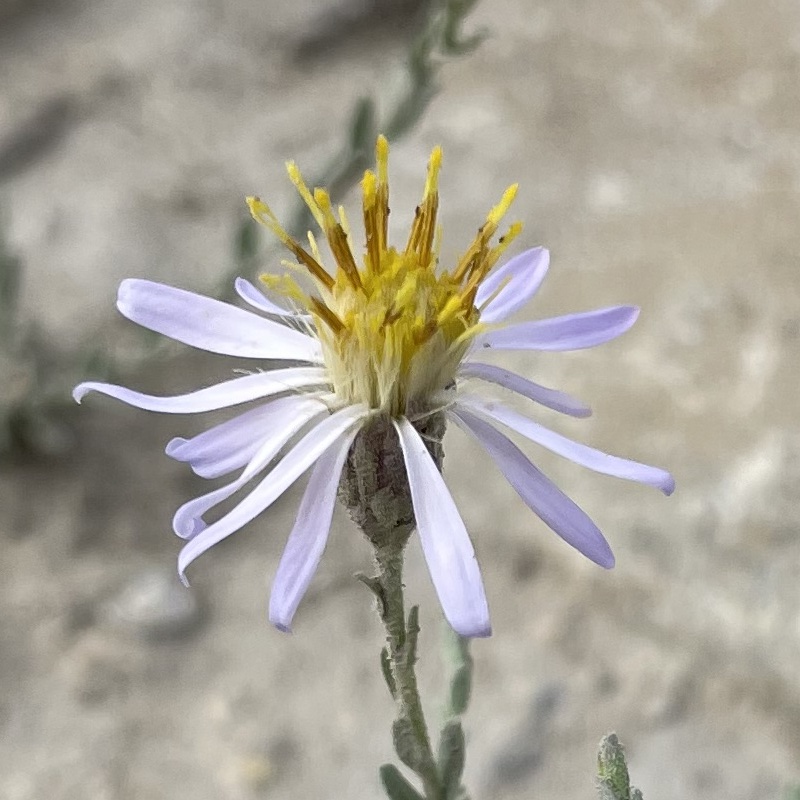
S. gypsophila flower head

== Taxonomy ==
- Astereae
  - Symphyotrichinae
    - Canadanthus
    - - Ampelaster
      - - Sanrobertia
        - - - Almutaster
            - Psilactis
          - Symphyotrichum
  - (other subtribes)

Cladogram references

The basionym of Sanrobertia gypsophila is Aster gypsophilus B.L.Turner, first published in 1974. In 1994, Guy L. Nesom reclassified it as Symphyotrichum gypsophilum (B.L.Turner) G.L.Nesom, even though the chromosome count varied from those species; he wrote that it appeared closely related to the virguloid species in the Symphyotrichum genus. In 2012, the results of further molecular analyses of Symphyotrichum and related species were published by David R. Morgan and Blake Holland which clearly placed it as separate from the Symphyotrichum genus. Thus, in 2018, Nesom published it in a monotypic genus within the subtribe Symphyotrichinae of the tribe Astereae. The cladogram shows that the genera Canadanthus, Ampelaster, and Sanrobertia are the earliest diverging members of Symphyotrichinae, developing their morphologies prior to the related species in Symphyotrichum, Almutaster, and Psilactis.

== Distribution and habitat ==
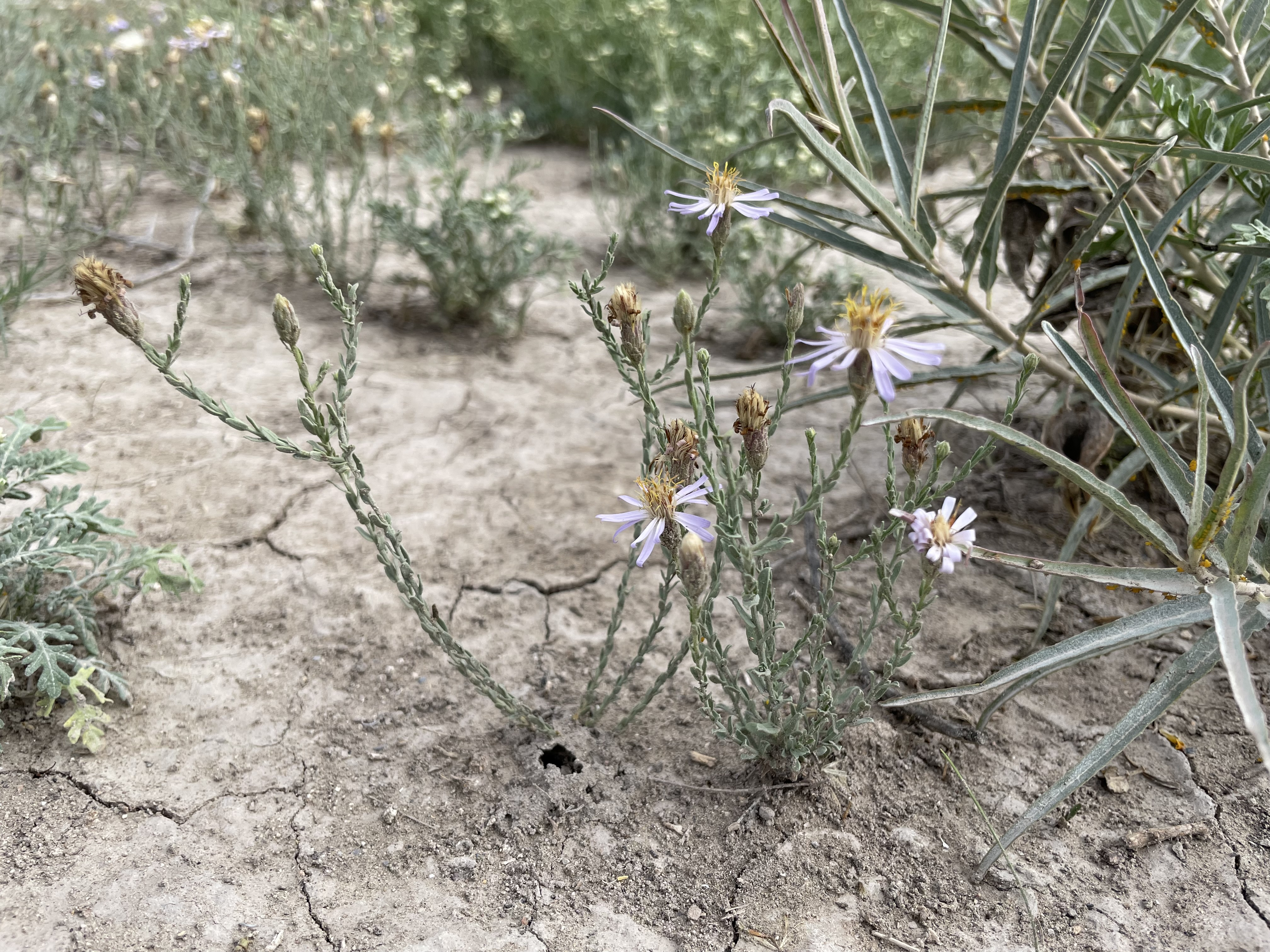
Large colony of S. gypsophila in its natural habitat in Nuevo León, Mexico

Sanrobertia gypsophila is a rare endemic species known only from gypsum flats and llanos near Entronque San Roberto (San Roberto Junction) in southwestern Nuevo León, Mexico, at about 1,800–2,200 meters (5,900–7,200 feet).
