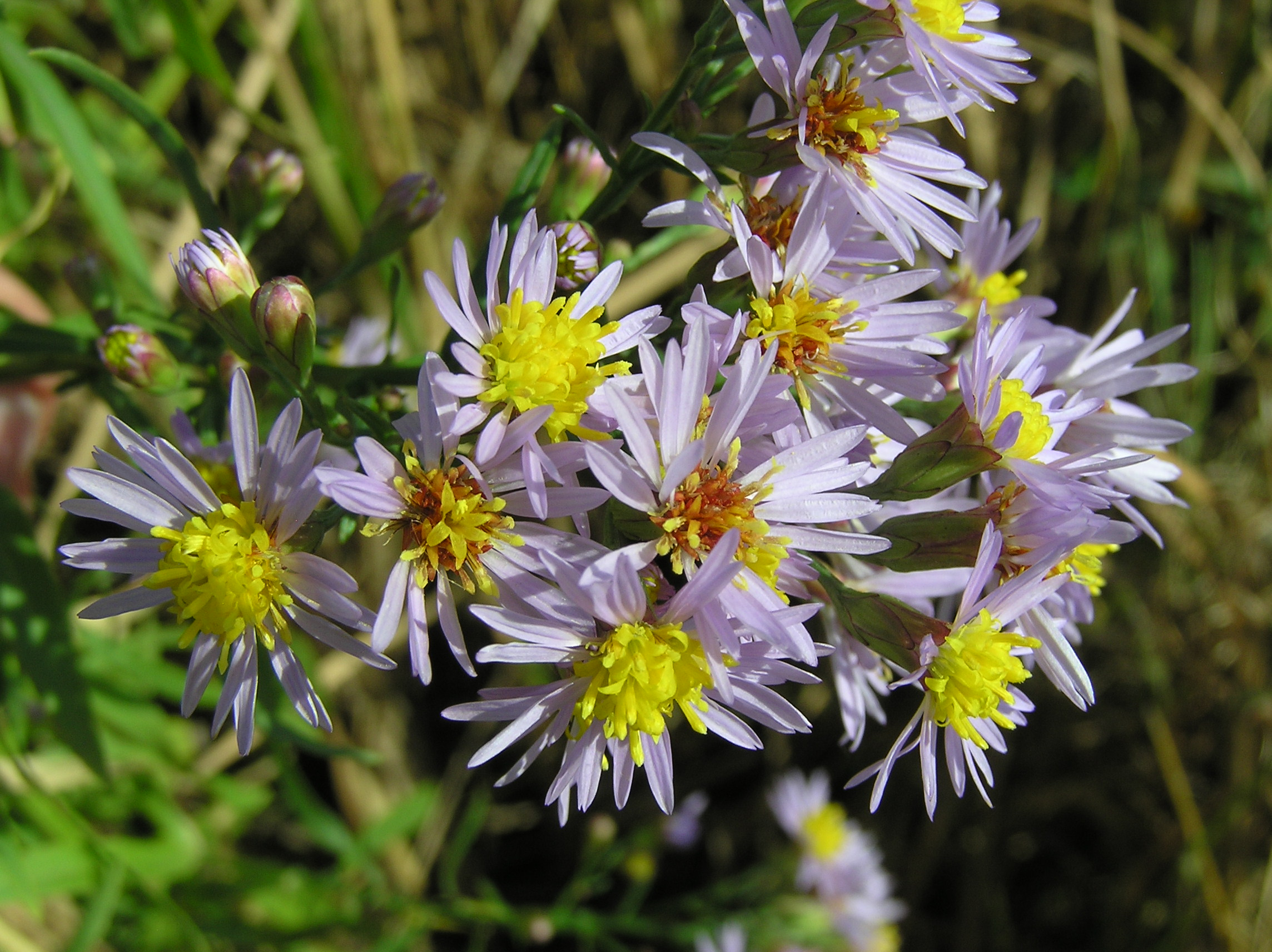
- Tripolium pannonicum

Scientific classification
- Kingdom: Plantae
- Clade: Embryophytes
- Clade: Tracheophytes
- Clade: Spermatophytes
- Clade: Angiosperms
- Clade: Eudicots
- Clade: Asterids
- Order: Asterales
- Family: Asteraceae
- Subfamily: Asteroideae
- Tribe: Astereae
- Subtribe: Bellidinae
- Genus: Tripolium; Nees

Type species
- Aster tripolium (syn of Tripolium pannonicum subsp. tripolium) L.

= Tripolium =

Genus of flowering plants

Tripolium is a genus of Eurasian and North African plants in the tribe Astereae within the family Asteraceae.

== Species ==
a) species accepted

- Tripolium pannonicum (Jacq.) Dobrocz. - widespread from Ireland + Algeria to Japan
- Tripolium sorrentinoi (Tod.) Raimondo & Greuter - Sicily

b) species formerly included

once regarded as belonging to Tripolium but now considered better suited to other genera:

- Tripolium caricifolium - Aster caricifolius
- Tripolium conspicuum - Symphyotrichum squamatum
- Tripolium conspicuum - Aster squamatus
- Tripolium conspicuum - Aster squamatus
- Tripolium divaricatum - Symphyotrichum subulatum var. ligulatum
- Tripolium frondosum - Symphyotrichum frondosum
- Tripolium humile - Aster vahlii var. tenuifolius
- Tripolium moelleri - Aster squamatus
- Tripolium occidentale - Symphyotrichum spathulatum
- Tripolium oliganthum - Aster squamatus
- Tripolium pauciflorum - Almutaster pauciflorus
- Tripolium subulatum - Aster subulatus
- Tripolium tenuifolium - Symphyotrichum vahlii
- Tripolium uniflorum - Symphyotrichum vahlii

c) species listed as being of unresolved status

- Tripolium andinum
- Tripolium angustatum
- Tripolium angustum
- Tripolium conspicuum
- Tripolium flexuosum
- Tripolium imbricatum
- Tripolium longicaule
- Tripolium maritimum
- Tripolium oregonum
- Tripolium paludosum
- Tripolium pauciflorum
- Tripolium subulatum
