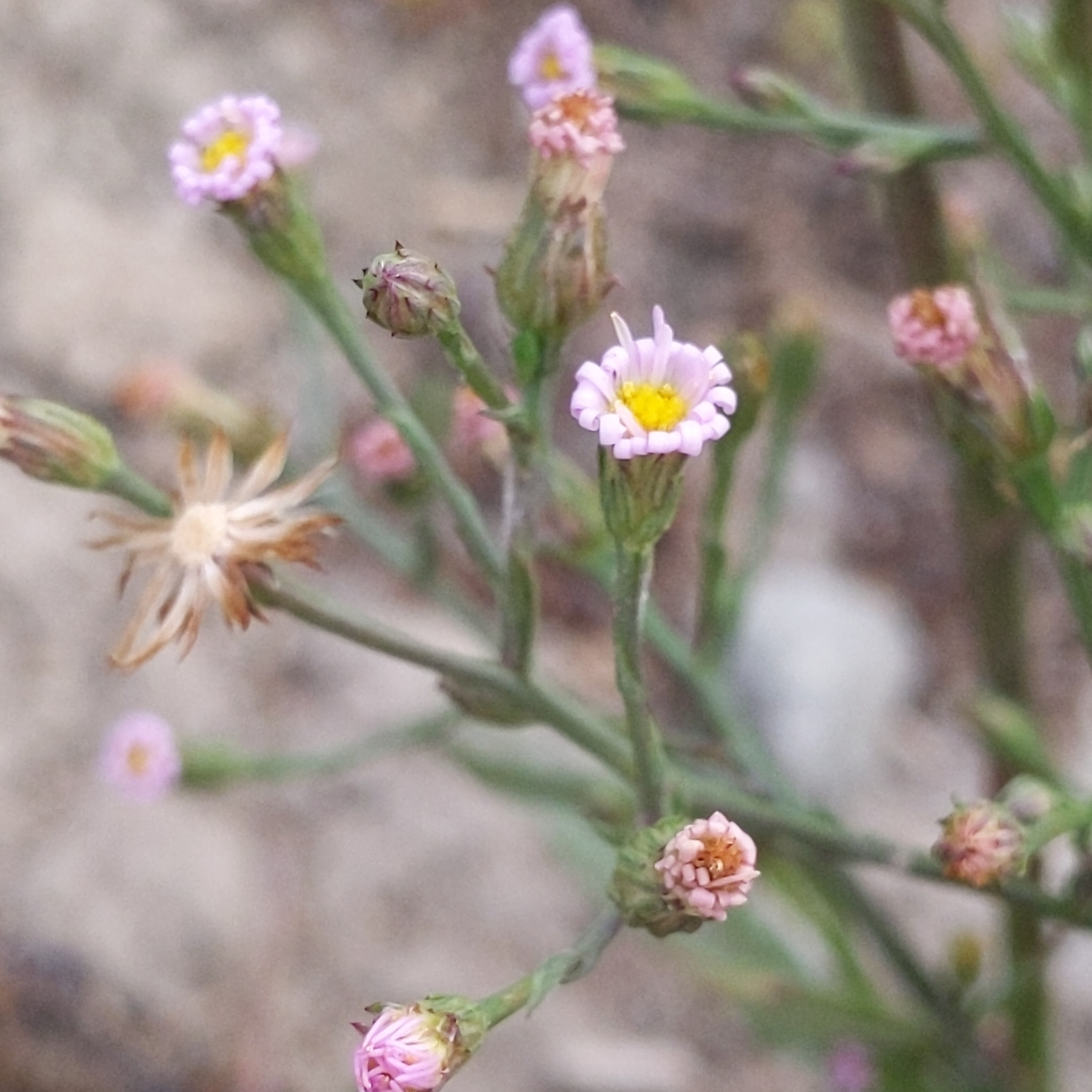
- S. parviflorum growing at Coyote Hills Regional Park in Alameda County, California

Scientific classification
- Kingdom: Plantae
- Clade: Tracheophytes
- Clade: Angiosperms
- Clade: Eudicots
- Clade: Asterids
- Order: Asterales
- Family: Asteraceae
- Tribe: Astereae
- Subtribe: Symphyotrichinae
- Genus: Symphyotrichum
- Subgenus: Symphyotrichum subg. Astropolium
- Species: S. parviflorum

Binomial name
- Symphyotrichum parviflorum (Nees) Greuter
- Native distribution

Synonyms
- Basionym: Aster parviflorus Nees; Alphabetical list: Aster exilis Elliott; Aster heleius Urb.; Aster inconspicuus Less.; Aster madrensis M.E.Jones; Aster neomexicanus Wooton & Standl.; Aster subulatus var. cubensis (DC.) Shinners; Erigeron expansus Poepp.; Symphyotrichum expansum (Poepp. ex Spreng.) G.L.Nesom; Symphyotrichum subulatum var. parviflorum (Nees) S.D.Sundb.; Tripolium subulatum var. parviflorum Nees

= Symphyotrichum parviflorum =

Species of flowering plant in the aster family

Symphyotrichum parviflorum (formerly Symphyotrichum subulatum var. parviflorum) is an annual and herbaceous plant commonly known as southwestern annual saltmarsh aster. It is native to Mexico, the Caribbean, most of Central America, Ecuador, and the southwestern United States. It is also known by the scientific name Symphyotrichum expansum.

== Description ==
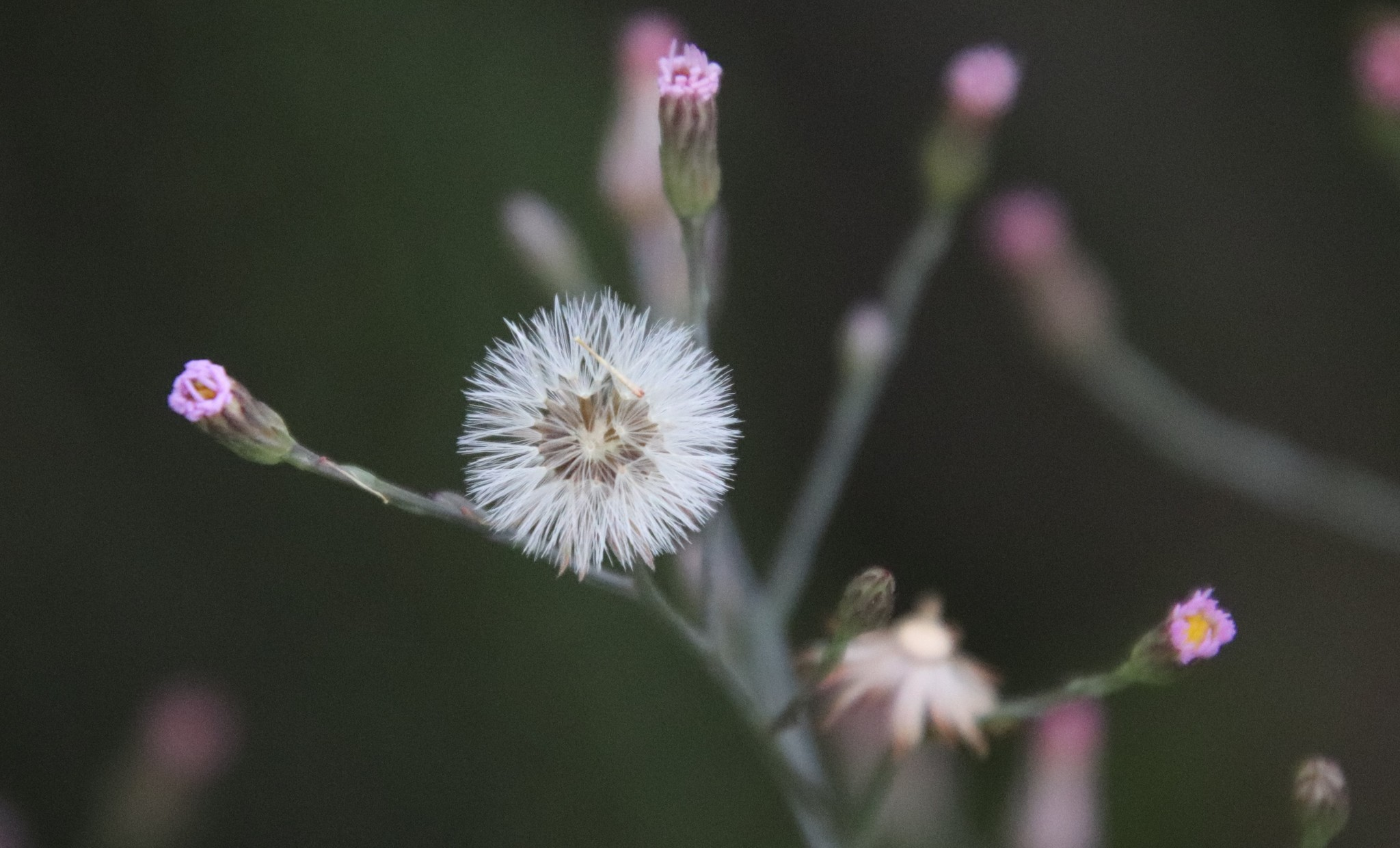
S. parviflorum growing at Lake Murray, San Diego, California

Southwestern annual saltmarsh aster usually flowers from July through November, but sometimes into January. It has white, sometimes pink, ray florets surrounding yellow disk florets. As the plant is drying after pollination, each ray floret curls into 1 to 2 coils.

== Taxonomy ==
The basionym of Symphyotrichum parviflorum is Aster parviflorus, and it was first described by Christian Gottfried Daniel Nees von Esenbeck ("Nees") in 1818. It also has been called Symphyotrichum expansum with the basionym Erigeron expansus and Symphyotrichum subulatum var. parviflorum.

== Distribution and habitat ==
Symphyotrichum parviflorum is native to Mexico, the Caribbean, most of Central America, Ecuador, and the southwestern United States. It is an introduced species in central Europe. Flora of North America reports an introduction of the species in Hawaii and Japan. It grows in marshy habitats and roadsides at 0–1,100 meters (0–3,600 feet), sometimes up to 4,000 m (13,100 ft), and it is often considered weedy.

== Conservation ==
As of December 2021, NatureServe gives no global status rank to this plant. It does rank it as Critically Imperiled in Nevada.
