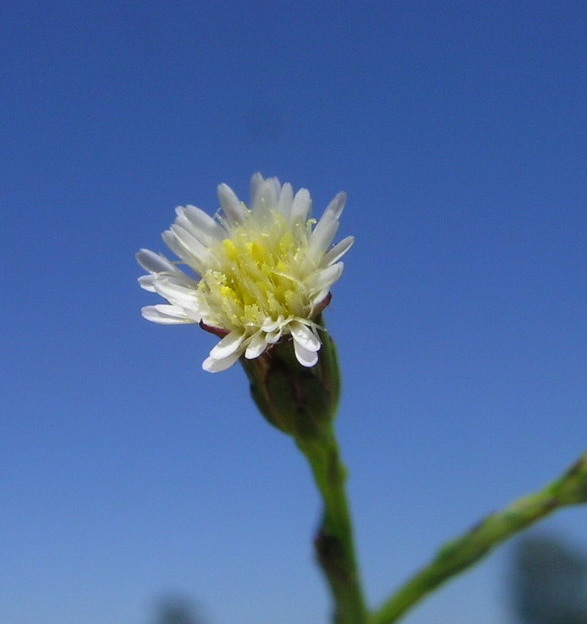
- Symphyotrichum subulatum var. subulatum

Conservation status
- Secure (NatureServe)

- Least Concern (IUCN 3.1)

Scientific classification
- Kingdom: Plantae
- Clade: Tracheophytes
- Clade: Angiosperms
- Clade: Eudicots
- Clade: Asterids
- Order: Asterales
- Family: Asteraceae
- Tribe: Astereae
- Subtribe: Symphyotrichinae
- Genus: Symphyotrichum
- Subgenus: Symphyotrichum subg. Astropolium
- Species: S. subulatum

Binomial name
- Symphyotrichum subulatum (Michx.) G.L.Nesom

Varieties
- S. subulatum var. subulatum; S. subulatum var. elongatum (Boss. ex A.G.Jones & Lowry) S.D.Sundb.; S. subulatum var. squamatum (Spreng.) S.D.Sundb.
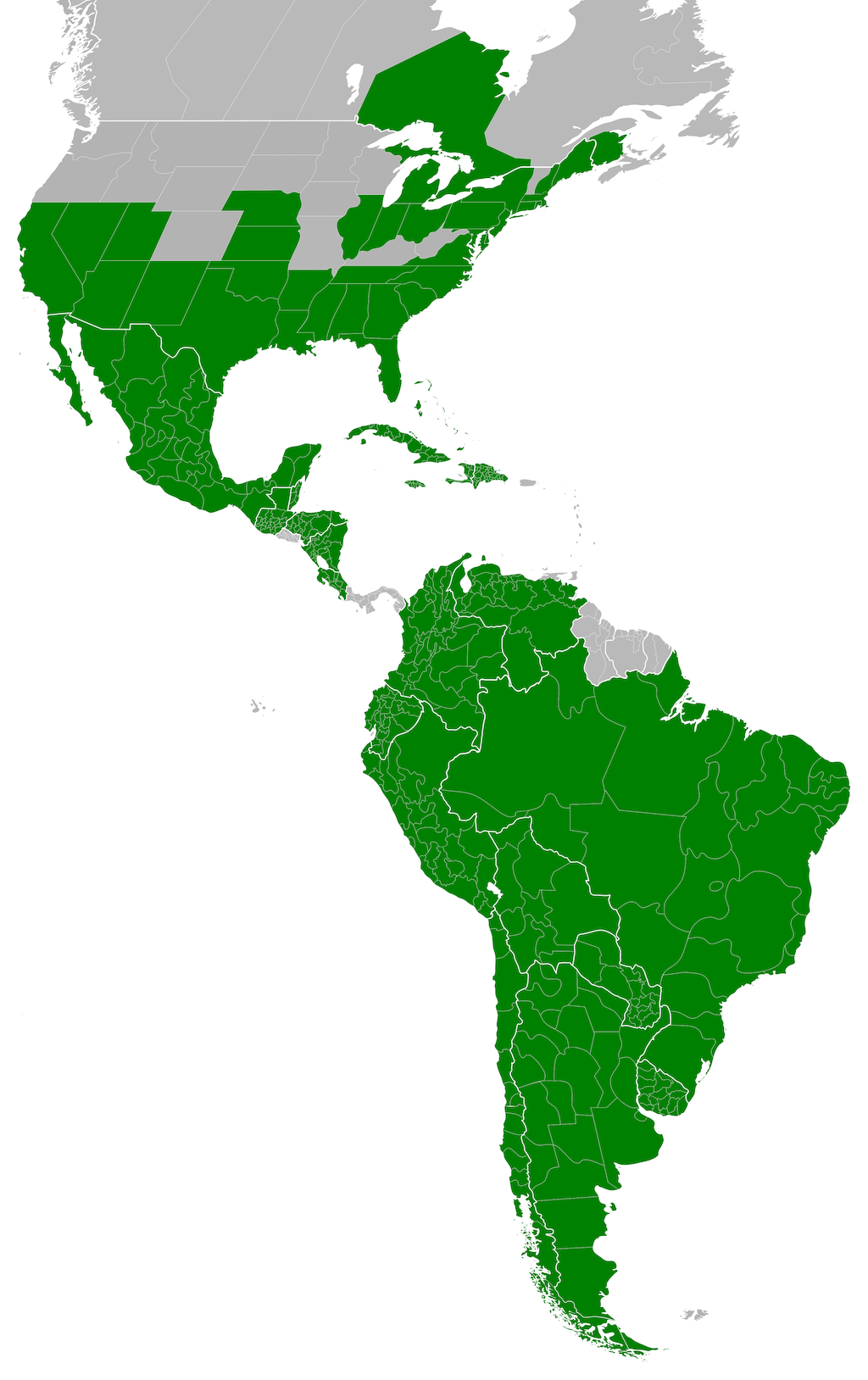
- Combined native distribution

Synonyms
- Basionym: Aster subulatus Michx.; Synonyms of varieties var. subulatum: Aster exilis var. australis A.Gray; Aster exilis f. subalpinus R.E.Fr.; Aster flexicaulis Raf.; Aster linifolius Torr. & A.Gray; Aster subulatus var. australis (A.Gray) Shinners; Aster subulatus var. euroauster Fernald & Griscom; Aster subulatus var. obtusifolius Fernald; Chrysocoma linifolia Steud.; Erigeron linifolius Bertero ex DC.; Mesoligus subulatus Raf.; Tripolium subulatum Nees; var. elongatum: Aster bahamensis Britton; Aster subulatus var. elongatus Boss. ex A.G.Jones & Lowry; Symphyotrichum bahamense (Britton) G.L.Nesom; var. squamatum: Aster asteroides Rusby; Aster bangii Rusby; Aster barcinonensis Sennen; Aster moelleri Reiche; Aster pseudobarcincnensis Sennen; Aster sandwicensis (A.Gray ex H.Mann) Hieron.; Aster squamatus (Spreng.) Hieron.; Aster squamatus var. tripolioides (Phil.) Hieron.; Aster subtropicus Morong; Aster subulatus var. sandwicensis (A.Gray ex H.Mann) A.G.Jones; Baccharis asteroides Colla; Carphephorus junceus Durand; Conyza berteroana Phil.; Conyza squamata Spreng.; Conyzanthus squamatus (Spreng.) Tamamsch.; Erigeron depilis Phil.; Erigeron semiamplexicaulis Meyen; Erigeron tripolioides Phil.; Symphyotrichum squamatum (Spreng.) G.L.Nesom; Tripolium conspicuum Lindl. ex DC.; Tripolium imbricatum Nutt.; Tripolium moelleri Phil.; Tripolium oliganthum Phil.; Tripolium subulatum var. brasilianum DC.

= Symphyotrichum subulatum =

Species of plant in the aster family

Symphyotrichum subulatum (formerly Aster subulatus), commonly known as eastern annual saltmarsh aster or, in Britain and Ireland where it is naturalized, annual saltmarsh aster, is an annual plant in the family Asteraceae native to the eastern United States and the Gulf Coast to Texas. The species grows primarily in coastal salt marshes, although in the Ozarks it occurs as a non-marine weedy variety.

== Description ==
Symphyotrichum subulatum is an annual forb that possesses a single erect stem that can reach up to 1 meter (3 feet 3 inches) in height. The stem, along with its thin green to dark green leaves, are both hairless. The sheathing base-blades of the leaves are ovulate, and the margins are entire.

The top of the stem extends into a raceme inflorescence. The heads open up into bright yellow disc florets that are surrounded by ray florets that vary in color from white to lavender.

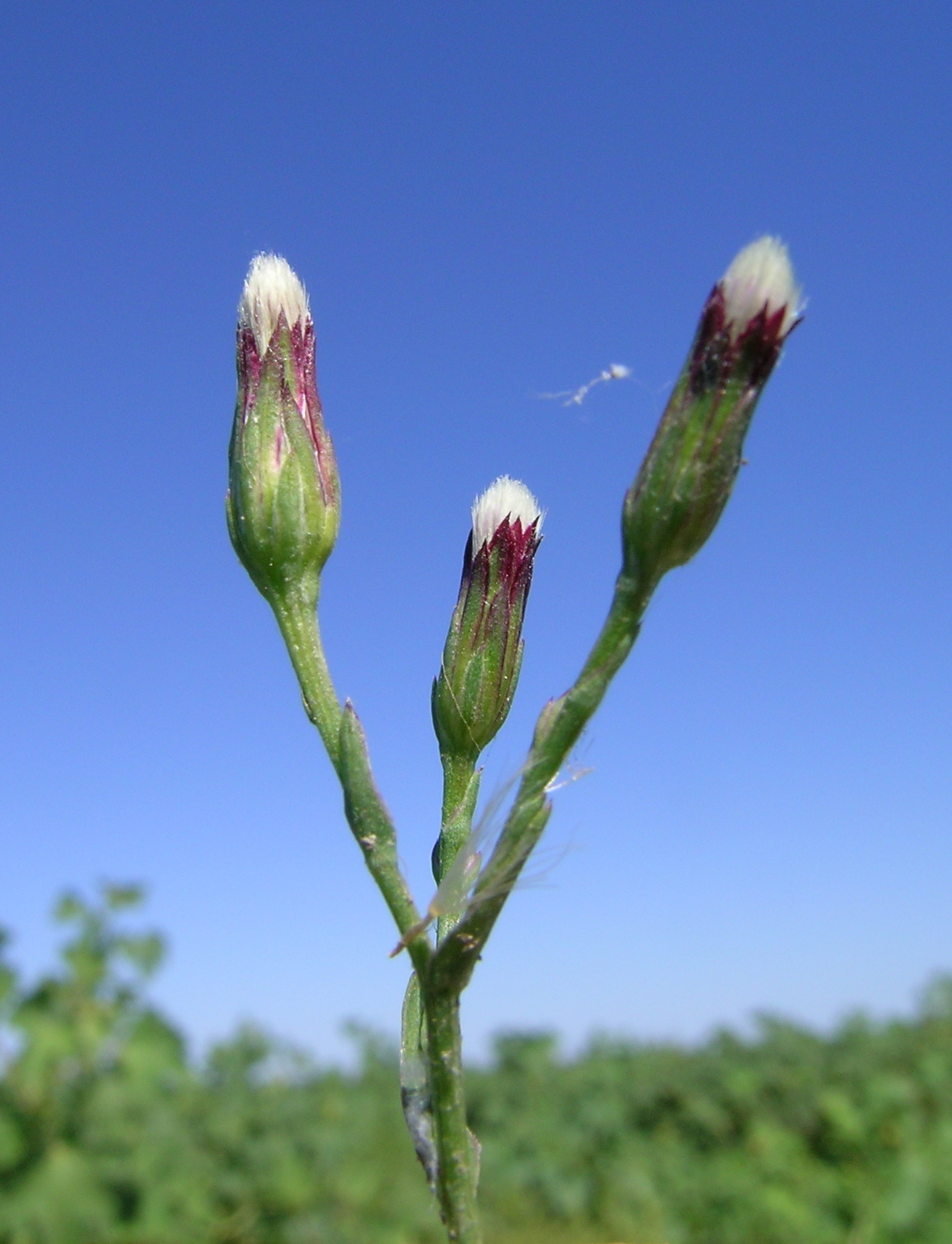
S. subulatum

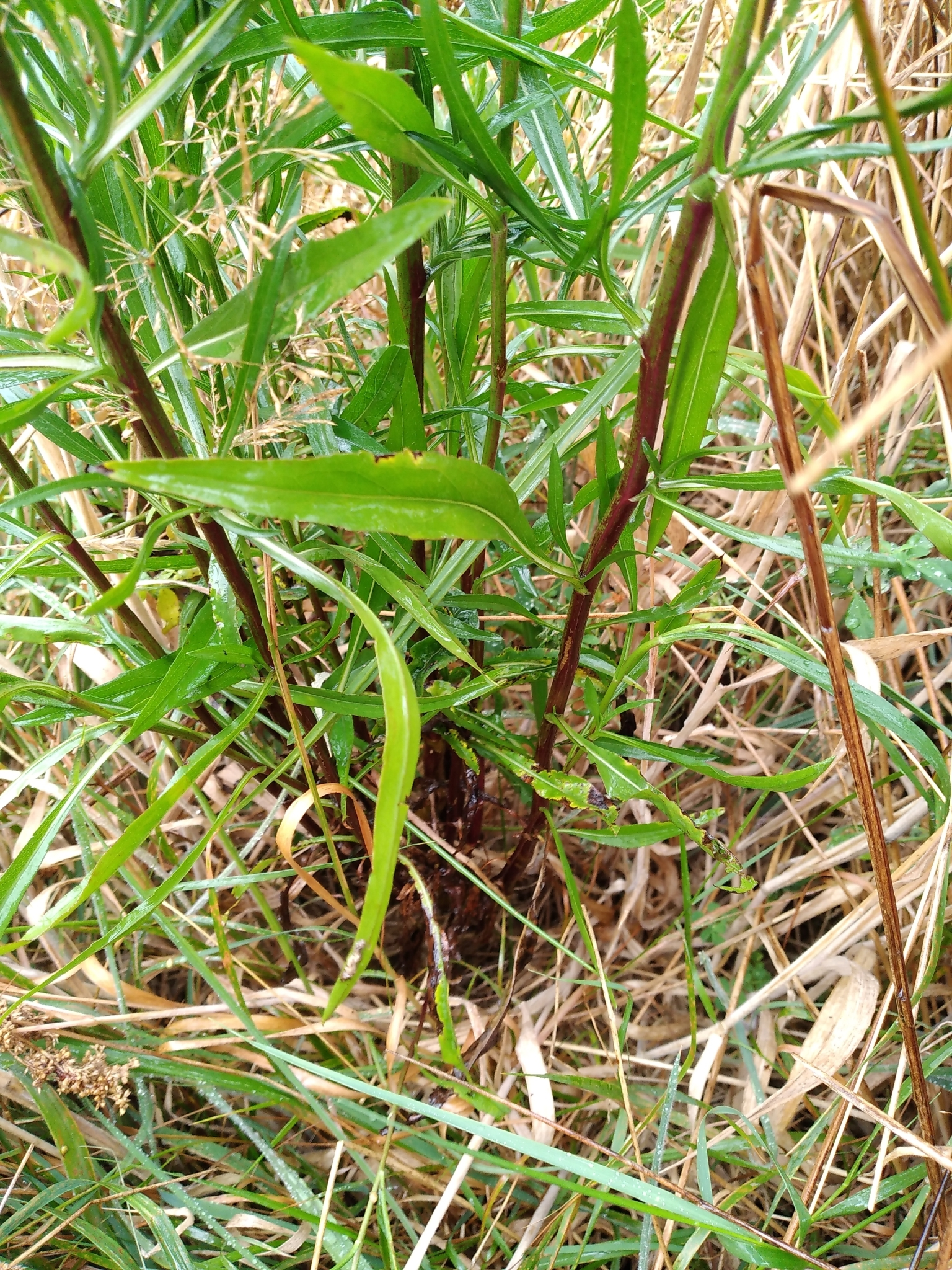
S. subulatum base

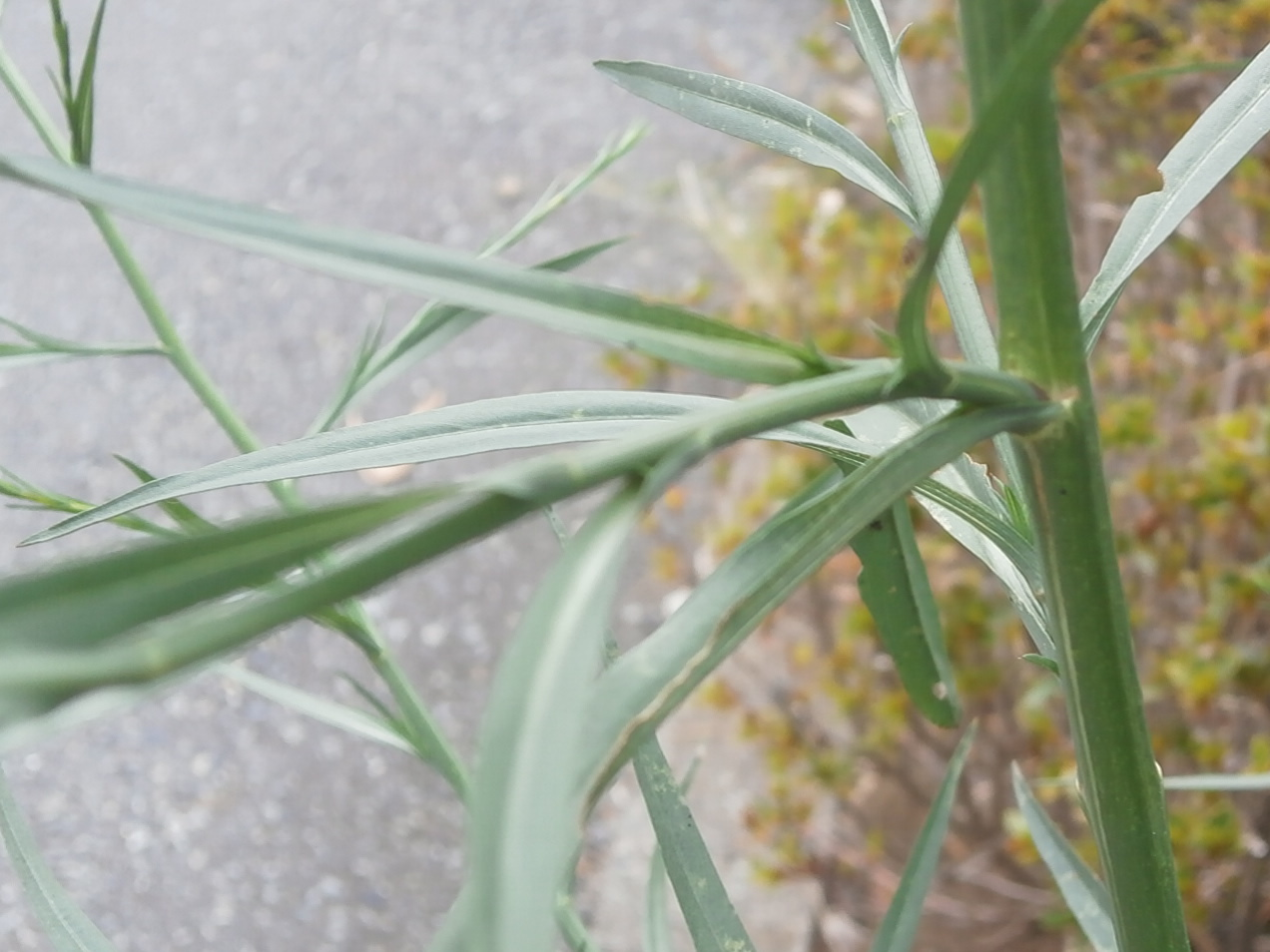
S. subulatum stem and leaves

== Taxonomy ==
The species' full scientific name is Symphyotrichum subulatum (Michx.) G.L.Nesom. As of December 2021, three varieties of S. subulatum were accepted by Plants of the World Online (POWO), with S. subulatum var. subulatum as the autonym:

- S. subulatum var. subulatum
- S. subulatum var. elongatum (Boss. ex A.G.Jones & Lowry) S.D.Sundb.
- S. subulatum var. squamatum (Spreng.) S.D.Sundb.

The varieties S. subulatum var. ligulatum (Shinners) S.D.Sundb. and S. s. var. parviflorum (Nees) S.D.Sundb., as of December 2021, are accepted at the species level by POWO as Symphyotrichum divaricatum (Nutt.) G.L.Nesom and Symphyotrichum expansum (Poepp. ex Spreng.) G.L.Nesom, respectively. As of December 2021, S. s. var. parviflorum (Nees) S.D.Sundb. is accepted at the species level by Catalogue of Life (COL) as Symphyotrichum parviflorum.

== Distribution and habitat ==
Symphyotrichum subulatum is a terrestrial species that will typically grow among grasses of any kind. It is found in salt marshes, pond margins, sloughs, swamps, crop field margins, lawns, and roadsides. It is thought to be especially prevalent in these areas because of a tolerance to saline soils and mowing. It is native to the eastern and Gulf Coast areas of the United States. It is also common across Mexico, the West Indies, Bermuda, Central America, and South America, depending on variety.

== Uses ==
According to the Lady Bird Johnson Wildflower Center, eastern annual saltmarsh aster can be planted to attract butterflies and has value for native bees.
