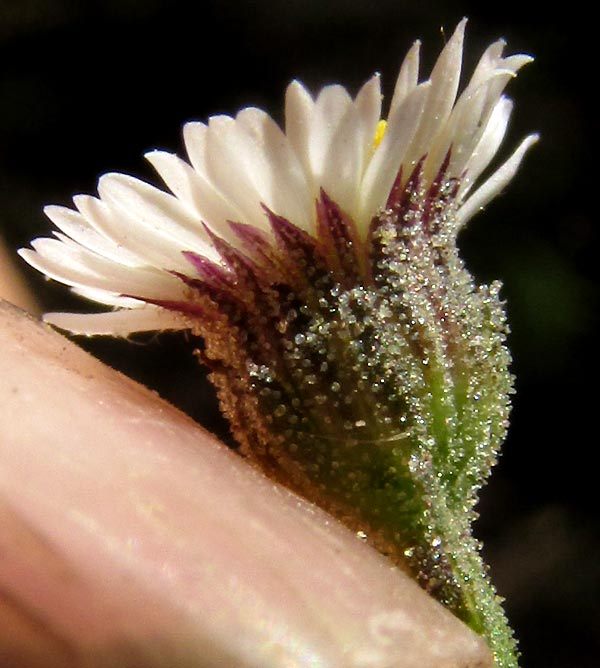
- Psilactis brevilingulata floral head with stalked glands on involucral bracts

Scientific classification
- Kingdom: Plantae
- Clade: Embryophytes
- Clade: Tracheophytes
- Clade: Spermatophytes
- Clade: Angiosperms
- Clade: Eudicots
- Clade: Asterids
- Order: Asterales
- Family: Asteraceae
- Genus: Psilactis
- Species: P. brevilingulata

Binomial name
- Psilactis brevilingulata Sch.Bip. ex Hemsl.

Synonyms
- Aster brevilingulatus (Sch.Bip. ex Hemsl.) McVaugh; Machaeranthera brevilingulata (Sch.Bip. ex Hemsl.) B.L.Turner & D.B.Horne; Psilactis brevilingulata f. andina Cuatrec

= Psilactis brevilingulata =

Species of plant

Psilactis brevilingulata, the Trans-Pecos tansyaster, is a species of mostly-neotropical plant belonging to the family the Asteraceae.

== Description ==
At first glance the Trans-Pecos Tansyaster may look like very many other aster-like species of the enormous Aster Family. However, these field marks help make this a distinctive, easy-to-recognize species:

- It is an annual plant up to 75 cm (30 in) tall, with stems and branches densely covered with stalked glands which sometimes are mixed with hairs, or trichomes.
- Leaves at the plant base may wither away by flowering time. Lower ones may have petioles with toothed or deeply lobed blades, while upper ones may develop no petioles and be quite narrow with no lobes or teeth, but broadest above their middles and only up to 10 mm (3/8 in) long and 1.5 mm (1/16 in) wide. Lower leaves are considerably larger.
- Floral heads consist of up to 40 "ray florets" at the head's margin with flat, very short, petal-like, white to purple corollas only up to 4 mm (3/16 in) long. These radiate from around the head's "eye," which consists of as many as 35 "disc florets" with yellow, cylindrical corollas. No scale-like bracts, or "paleae," appear among the floret bases.
- Both ray and disc florets produce one-seeded, cypsela-type fruits covered with slender hairs. Ray floret cypselae produce no pappuses, but disc floret cypselae bear pappuses consisting of up to 50 white to tawny bristles of unequal lengths, with each bristle covered with tiny, stiff barbs.

== Distribution ==
Psilactis brevilingulata has a disjunct distribution. Its northern population occurs in the Southwestern United States states of Arizona, New Mexico and Texas. In adjacent Mexico it occurs throughout except for the Baja California peninsula and adjacent northwestern states, and the Yucatan Peninsula. Its southern population occurs in South America in Colombia and Peru.

== Habitat ==
In the USA Psilactis brevilingulata occurs in fields, roadsides, stream banks and in oak and pine-oak forests. In Mexico it is found in grasslands, forest clearings, fields, burned areas, and sometimes as a weed in disturbed areas.

== Taxonomy ==
In 1879 when William Hemsley formally named and described Psilactis brevilingulata, he noted that his type specimen had been collected by Shaffner "prope Tacabayam", as expressed in Latin, meaning "near Tacubaya." Tacabayam is the declined form of the place name Tacubaya appropriate for answering "from where"; Tacubaya now is a neighborhood of Mexico City.

The collector Shaffner was Johann Wilhelm (Guillermo) Schaffner, who collected plants in Mexico during the years 1876-1879. Among herbaria holding Schaffner's collections, the Smithsonian Institution, for example, holds 889.

=== Etymology ===
The genus name Psilactis is based on the Greek psilos, meaning "bare," and actis, meaning "ray," alluding to this feature of species in the genus: The ray florets' one-seeded, cypsela-type fruits bear atop them no pappuses.

The species name brevilingulata is New Latin derived from brevi-, meaing "short." and -ligulata, meaning "shaped like a tongue," referring to the very short corollas of the species' ray florets.

== Gallery ==
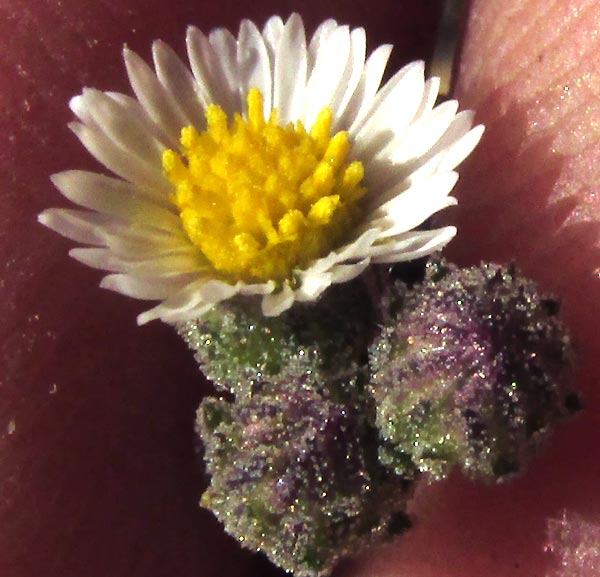
floral head from above

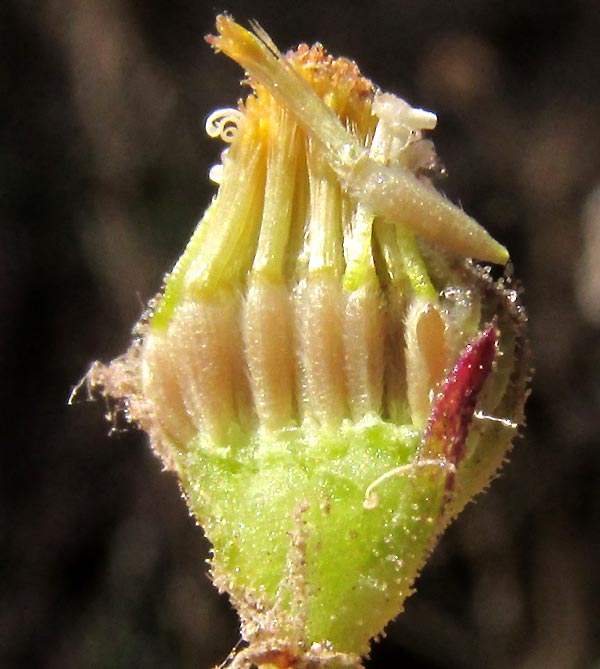
dissected floral head

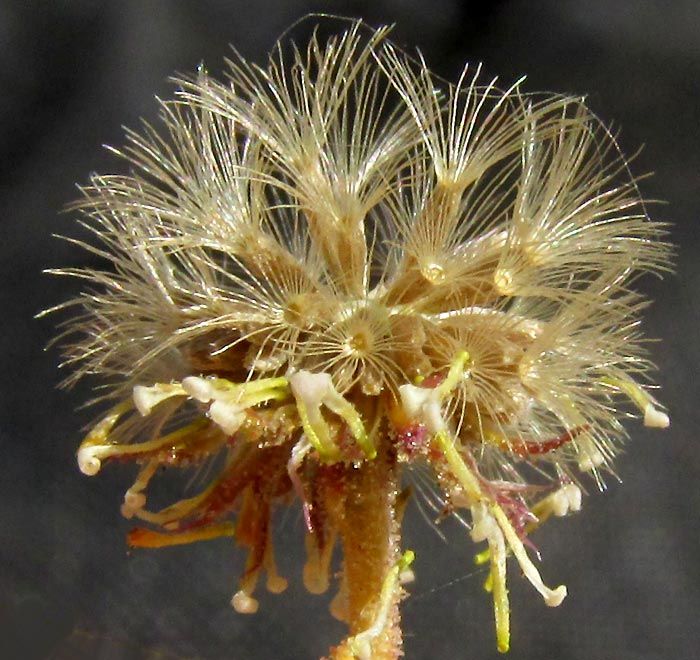
cypselae with pappuses

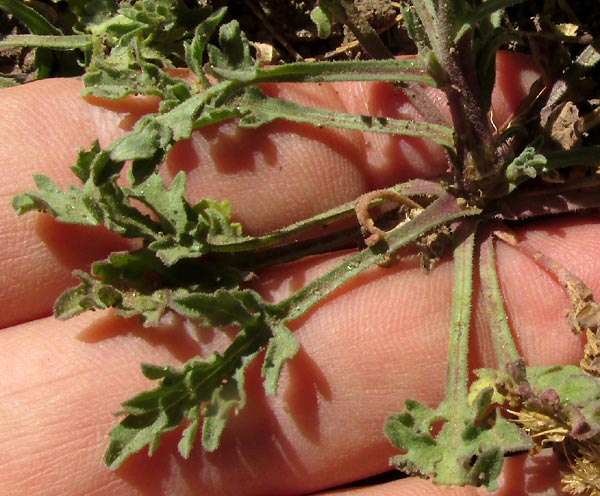
deeply lobed lower leaves

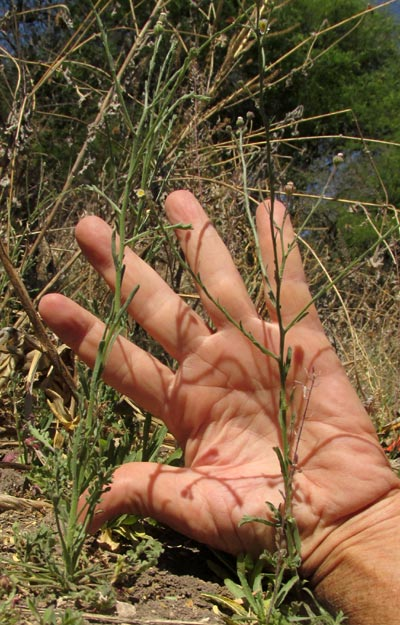
plant in habitat
