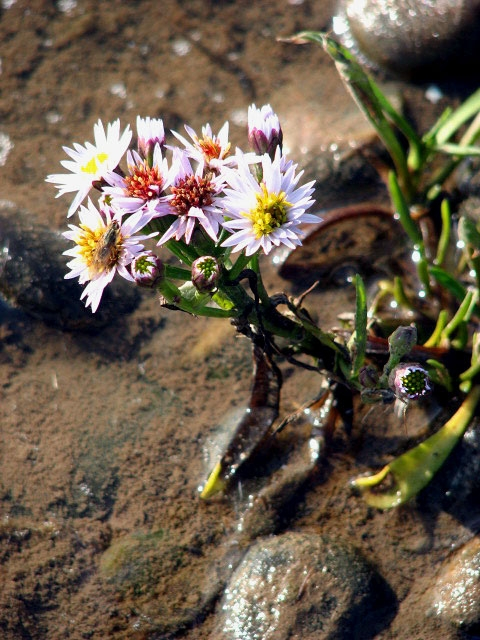

Scientific classification
- Kingdom: Plantae
- Clade: Tracheophytes
- Clade: Angiosperms
- Clade: Eudicots
- Clade: Asterids
- Order: Asterales
- Family: Asteraceae
- Genus: Tripolium
- Species: T. pannonicum

Binomial name
- Tripolium pannonicum (Jacq.) Dobrocz.

Synonyms
- Aster longicaulis (DC.) Dufour; Aster pannonicus Jacq.; Aster tripolium subsp. longicaulis (DC.) Nyman; Aster tripolium subsp. pannonicus (Jacq.) Soó; Tripolium longicaule (DC.) Dufour; Tripolium vulgare Nees, nom. illeg.; Tripolium vulgare var. longicaule DC.

= Tripolium pannonicum =

Sea aster

Species of plant

Tripolium pannonicum, called sea aster or seashore aster and often known by the synonyms Aster tripolium or Aster pannonicus, is a flowering plant, native to Eurasia and northern Africa, that is confined in its distribution to salt marshes, estuaries and occasionally to inland salt works.

It is a perennial growing up to 50 cm tall with fleshy lanceolate leaves and purple ray florets flowering from July to September. The plants tend to be short-lived and populations need significant new recruitment each year from new seedlings. There are rayed as well as rayless varieties and only the former have long blue or white florets. The rayless form is yellow. The plant flowers well into autumn and hence provides a valuable source of nectar for late-flying butterflies such as painted lady and red admiral.

Young leaves of this plant are edible and are collected for consumption on the floodplains of the Dutch province of Zeeland.

Sea aster was celebrated as the subject of a definitive stamp issued by the Irish post office, An Post, designed by Susan Sex.
