= George Neville Jones =

Botanist (1903-1970)

- Born: January 26, 1903; Boston, Lincolnshire, England
- Died: 25 June 1970 (aged 67)
- Education: State College of Washington (B.S., 1930), University of Washington (M.S., 1932 and Ph.D., 1937)
- Spouse: Almut Gitter Jones
- Scientific career
- Workplaces: Harvard University, University of Illinois
- Thesis: Flowering Plants and Ferns of Mount Rainier (1938)
- Author abbrev. (botany): G.N.Jones

George Neville Jones, usually known as G. Neville Jones, (1903–1970) was an English-born botanist who spent most of his life and career in the United States. He was a professor of botany at the University of Illinois (Urbana) at the time of his death.

== Biography ==
George Neville Jones was born in Boston, Lincolnshire, England on January 26, 1903, the eldest of seven children (six brothers and a sister). The family moved to Manitoba while he was still very young, and then to Seattle, Washington, at the end of his high school years.

Jones entered the State College of Washington (now the Washington State University, in Pullman, Washington) and graduated with a Bachelor of Science degree in 1930. His father, Alfred Loft Jones, died while George Neville was an undergraduate. He earned Master of Science and Doctor of Philosophy degrees from the University of Washington in Seattle. His doctoral thesis was published as the Flowering Plants and Ferns of Mount Rainier in 1938. He contributed over 1800 specimens to the herbarium at the University of Washington while a student there.

G. Neville, as he preferred to be known, was an instructor of biology at Harvard University and a technical assistant at the Arnold Arboretum from 1937 to 1939. He moved to the University of Illinois in 1939, as a taxonomist and curator of the herbarium. Between the years of 1939 and 1968, he contributed approximately 46,000 specimens to the herbarium, as well as publishing the Flora of Illinois in 1945. He produced second and third editions of this work in 1950 and 1963. He became an assistant professor in 1944, and was appointed a Guggenheim Fellow for a study of the botany of the Northwest Coast of North America.

Jones was first married to Florence Lucinda Freeman, with whom he collected species and coauthored scientific papers. Jones died on June 25, 1970, from injuries sustained in a car accident that had occurred on April 14, 1968. He was survived by his wife, Almut Gitter Jones, who was also in the car; by two daughters from a previous marriage, and all his siblings. He and his wife were on their way to Robert Allerton Park, a natural area belonging to the University of Illinois, at the time of the accident. A memorial plaque has been placed there under a linden (Tilia americana) tree—his last publication was a taxonomy of American species of Tilia.

== Herbaria ==
Herbaria containing specimens collected by Jones:

- University of Washington (WTU)
- University of Illinois (IL)
- Harvard University, Gray Herbarium (GH)
- Lund University (LD)
- University of Copenhagen (C)
- Missouri Botanical Garden (MO)
- Northern Illinois University (DEK)

== Selected publications ==
- Grout's Moss Flora of North America (Contributor) (1933)
- A Botanical Survey of the Olympic Peninsula, Washington (1936)
- The Flowering Plants and Ferns of Mount Rainier (1938)
- Flora of Illinois (1945); Jones, George Neville (April 2012). 2012 reprint. Literary Licensing, LLC. ISBN 978-1258305871.
- American species of Amelanchier (1946); 2015 reprint. ISBN 9333308482.
- An Enumeration of Illinois Pteridophyta (1947)
- Vascular Plants of Illinois (with G.D. Fuller) (1955); Jones, George Neville; Fuller, George Damon (31 March 2012). 2012 reprint. Literary Licensing, LLC. ISBN 978-1258259594.
- An Annotated Bibliography of Mexican Ferns (1966)
