= Almut Gitter Jones =

German-American botanist (1923-2013)

- Born: Almut Gitter; 8 September 1923; Oldenburg, Niedersachen, Germany
- Died: 12 October 2013 (aged 90); Urbana, Illinois
- Education: University of Illinois (BSc 1958, MSc 1960, PhD 1973)
- Spouse: George Neville Jones
- Scientific career
- Thesis: Taxonomy, Phytogeography, and Biosystematy of Aster, Section Multiflori. (1973)
- Author abbrev. (botany): A.G.Jones

Almut Gitter Jones (8 September 1923 – 12 October 2013) was a German-American botanist, mycologist, and plant taxonomist known for her work in taxonomy and plant systematics researching the genus Aster, as well as for her work as curator of the herbarium at the University of Illinois.

== Biography ==
Jones was born Almut Gitter in Oldenburg, Germany to Alfred and Emma (née Eickhorst) Gitter. She married fellow botanist George Neville Jones in Urbana, Illinois in 1958.

Jones enrolled at the University of Illinois and received her B.Sc. degree with high honors in agriculture in 1958. She remained at the same university to complete her M.Sc. degree in botany with a minor in agronomy in 1960. In 1973, she earned her Ph.D. from the botany department specializing in plant taxonomy with a minor in agronomy.

In 1958, she married fellow botanist and collector George Neville Jones in Urbana, Illinois.

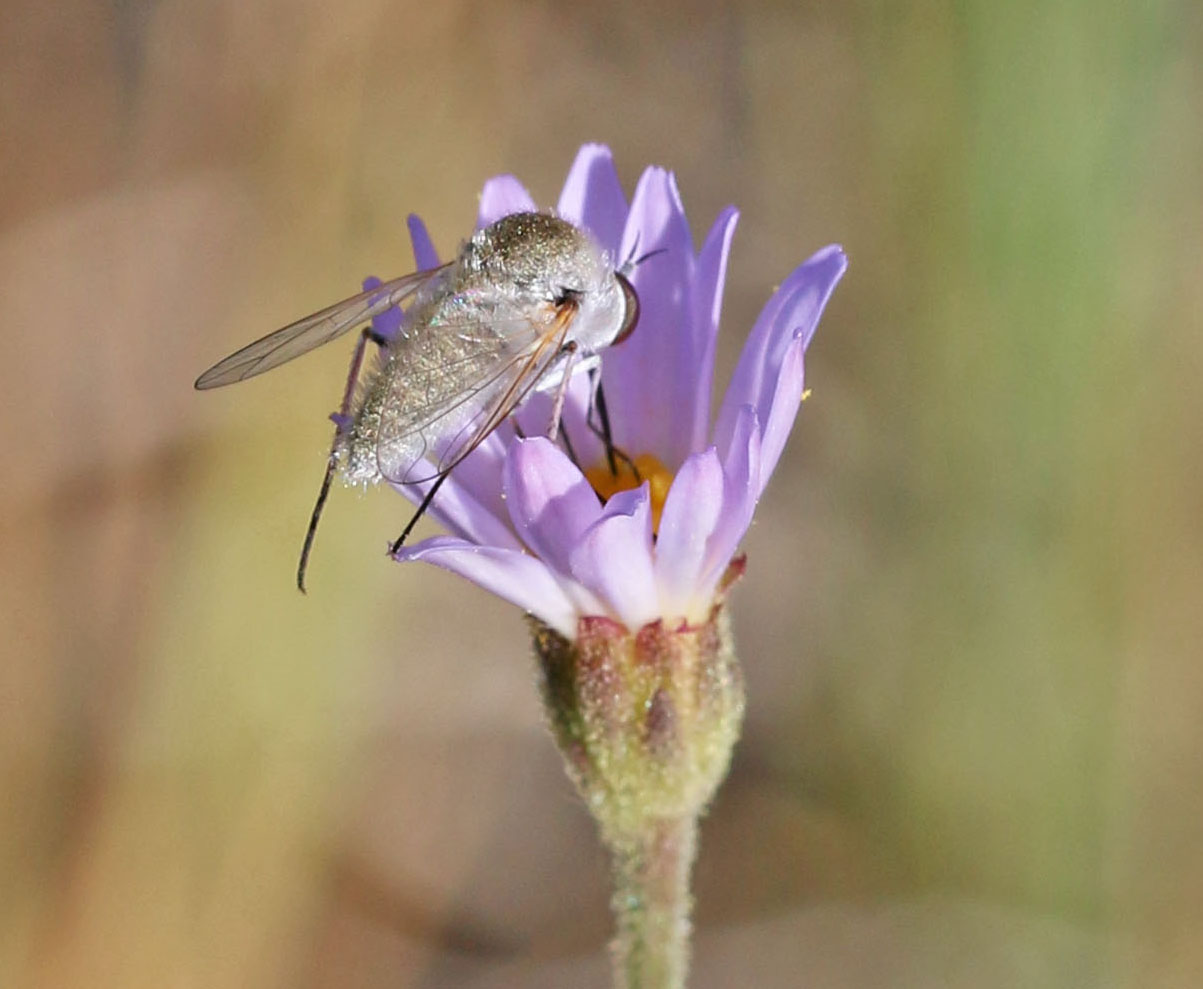
A fly pollinating the alkali-marsh aster (Almutaster pauciflorus syn. Aster pauciflorus), aster family (Asteraceae), Meadow Hot Springs, Millard County, Utah

She described over fifty species, and the genus Almutaster of the family Asteraceae was named for her in 1982. According to the database Bionomia, Jones identified at least 1,678 specimens from at least nine countries, collected 723 specimens, and 937 of these specimens have been used in at least 51 published works. Although her collecting covers many species, the majority are from the family Asteraceae. She published many papers about this large group of species and became "recognized nationally and internationally as an authority on Aster."

The standard author abbreviation A.G.Jones is used to indicate this person as the author when citing a botanical name. In her work as curator in 1997, Jones co-authored An annotated catalogue of types of the University of Illinois mycological collections (ILL), documenting the herbarium's fungal type specimens.

Almut Gitter Jones died on October 12, 2013 at 90, in Urbana.

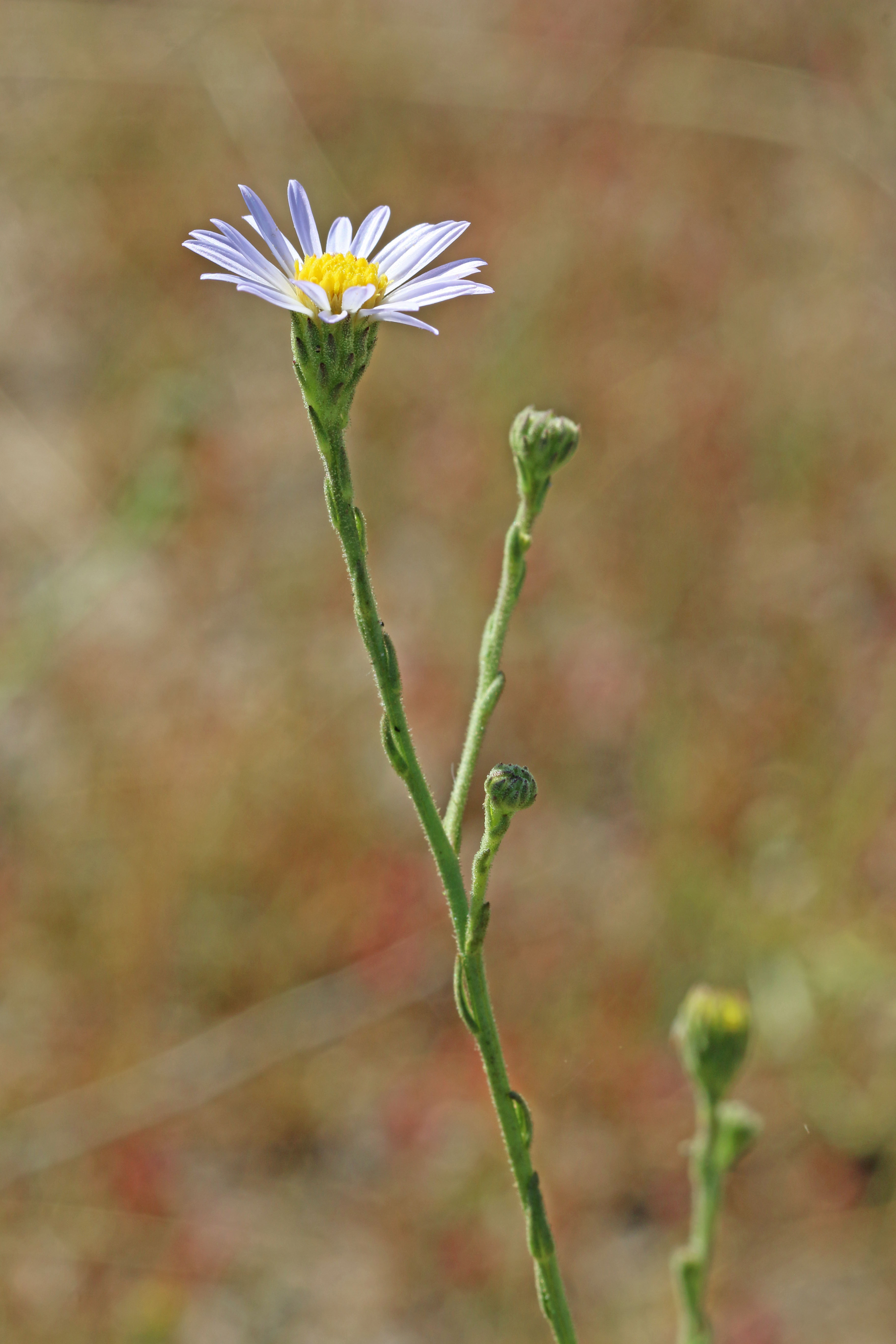
Almutaster pauciflorus, Utah Lake Wetland Preserve near Goshen, Utah County, Utah. The monotypic genus Almutaster was named for Jones.

== Selected publications ==
- Jones, Almut G. “A Classification of the New World Species of Aster (Asteraceae).” Brittonia, 1980.
- Jones, Almut G. “A Study of Wild Leek, and the Recognition of Allium Burdickii (Liliaceae).” Systematic Botany, 1979.
- Jones, Almut G. “Addendum to an Annotated Catalogue of Type Specimens in the University of Illinois Herbarium (ILL) -- Piperaceae.” Phytologia, 1990.
- Jones, Almut G. “Aster and Brachyactis in Illinois.” Illinois Natural History Survey Bulletin, 1989.
- Jones, Almut G. “Aster Ericoides L. East of the Mississippi River.” American Midland Naturalist, 1974.
- Jones, Almut G. “Aster Section Ericoidei Correct for the Species Group That Includes the Type of Aster Ericoides L.” Taxon, 1983.
- Jones, Almut G. “Chromosomal Features as Generic Criteria in the Astereae.” Taxon, 1985.
- Jones, Almut G. “Data on Chromosome Numbers in Aster (Asteraceae), With Comments on the Status and Relationships of Certain North American Species.” Brittonia, 1980.
- Jones, Almut G. “Environmental Effects on the Percentage of Stainable and Presumed Normal Pollen in Aster (Compositae).” American Journal of Botany, 1976.
- Jones, Almut G. “Errata: A Classification of the New World Species of Aster (Asteraceae).” Brittonia, 1981.
- Jones, Almut G. “Lectotypification of Aster Jessicae Piper: A Rebuttal.” Taxon, 1987.
- Jones, Almut G. “New Data on Chromosome Numbers in Aster Section Heterophylli (Asteraceae) and Their Phylogenetic Implications.” Systematic Botany, 1977.
- Jones, Almut G. “Nomenclatural Changes in Aster (Asteraceae).” Bulletin of the Torrey Botanical Club, 1983.
- Jones, Almut G. “Nomenclatural Notes on Aster (Asteraceae)—III. The Status of a. Sandwicensis.” Brittonia, 1984.
- Jones, Almut G. “Nomenclatural Transfer from Aster to Machaeranthera (Asteraceae).” Systematic Botany, 1983.
- Jones, Almut G. “Observations on Reproduction and Phenology in Some Perennial Asters.” American Midland Naturalist, 1978.
- Jones, Almut G. “Observations on the Shape and Exposure of Style Branches in the Astereae (Compositae).” American Journal of Botany, 1976.
- Jones, Almut G. “The Status of Aster Adsurgens E.L. Greene.” Taxon, 1975.
- Jones, Almut G. “Typification of Aster Jessicae Piper and Reinstatement of A. Mollis Rydberg (Asteraceae).” Madroño; a West American journal of botany, 1984.
- Jones, Almut G. “Virgulus Raf. Vis-à-Vis Aster L. (Asteraceae).” Taxon, 1982.
