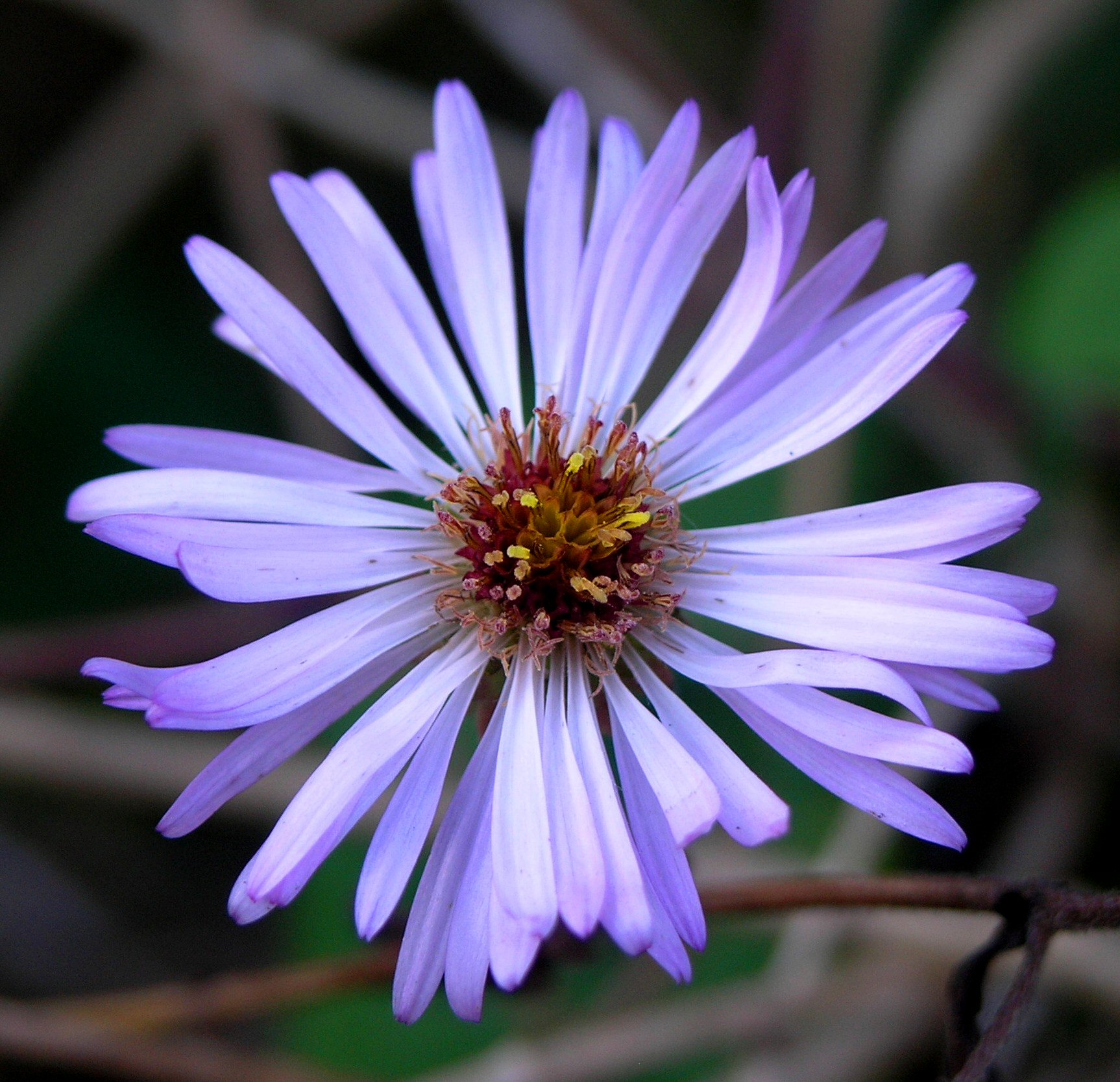

Scientific classification
- Kingdom: Plantae
- Clade: Embryophytes
- Clade: Tracheophytes
- Clade: Angiosperms
- Clade: Eudicots
- Clade: Asterids
- Order: Asterales
- Family: Asteraceae
- Subfamily: Asteroideae
- Tribe: Astereae
- Subtribe: Symphyotrichinae
- Genus: Ampelaster; G.L.Nesom
- Species: A. carolinianus

Binomial name
- Ampelaster carolinianus (Walter) G.L.Nesom

Synonyms
- Synonyms of genus name: Aster Linnaeus sect. Sagittiferi A. Gray; Aster sect. Caroliniani Small; Lasallea Greene subsect. Carolinianae (Small) Semple & Brouillet; Virgulus Rafinesque sect. Sagittiferi (A. Gray) Reveal & Keener; Synonyms of species name: Aster carolinianus Walter; Aster scandens J.Jacq. ex Spreng.; Lasallea caroliniana (Walter) Semple & Brouillet; Symphyotrichum carolinianum (Walter) Wunderlin & B.F.Hansen; Virgulus carolinianus (Walter) Reveal & Keener

= Ampelaster =

Genus of flowering plants

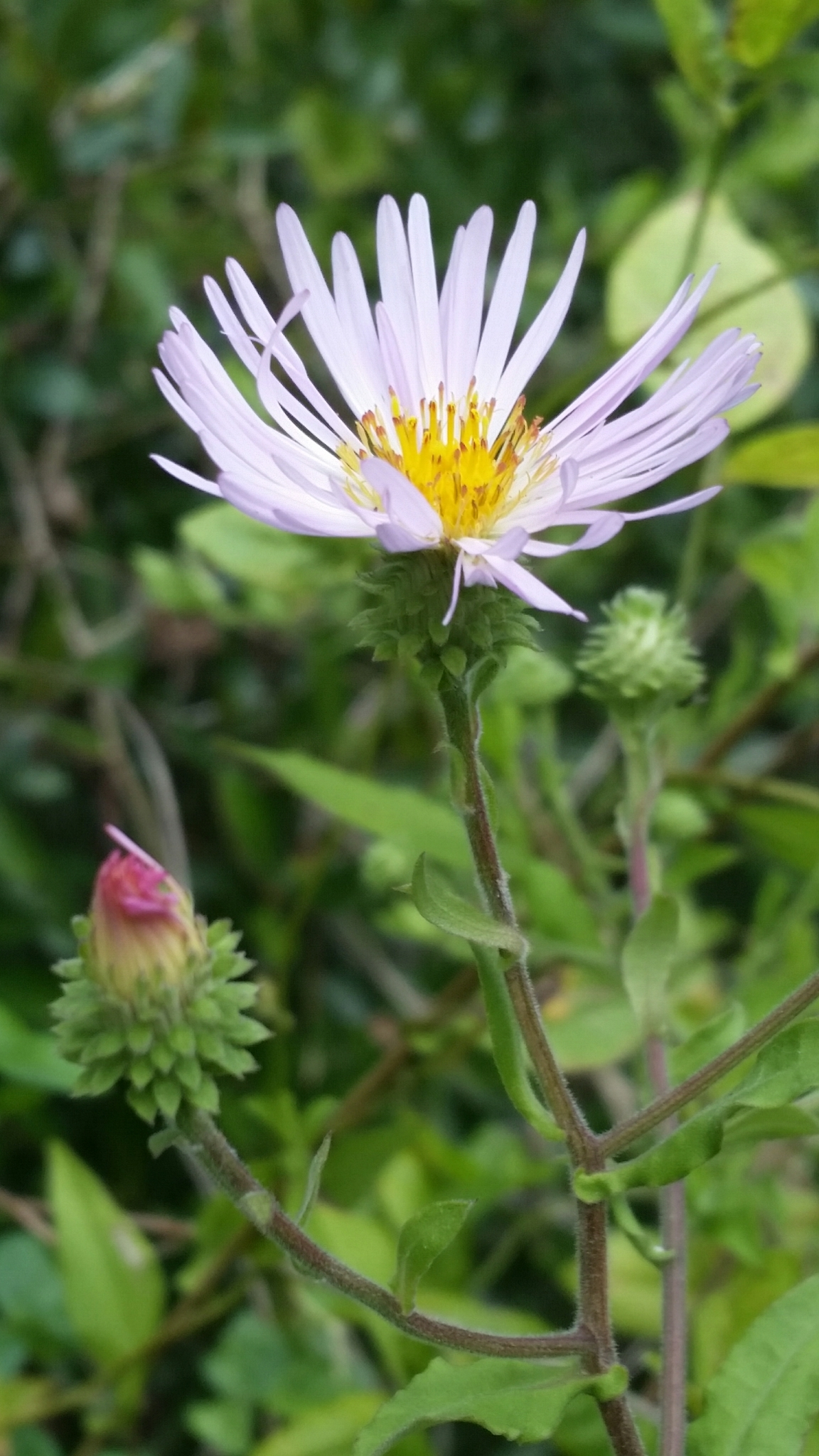
Ampelaster carolinianus

Ampelaster is a North American monotypic genus of flowering plants in the family Asteraceae. There is a single known species, Ampelaster carolinianus, with the common name of climbing aster. It is native to the southeastern United States, in the States of Florida, Georgia, North Carolina, and South Carolina.

Ampelaster carolinianus is unusual in the family in that it is a climber, using other plants to support its weight. Sometimes it uses adventitious roots to this end. Flower heads are 1–15 per branch, with both ray florets and disc florets, the flowers pale pink to rose-purple.
