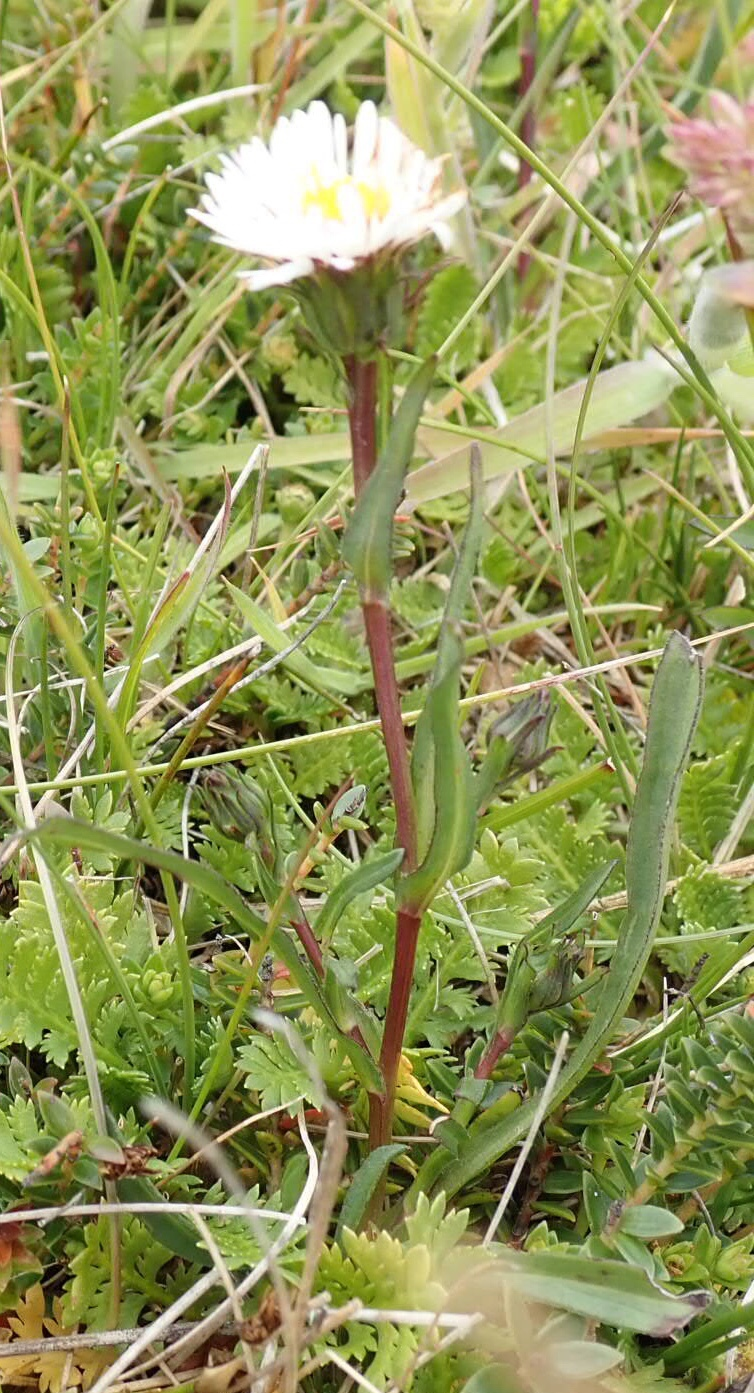

Scientific classification
- Kingdom: Plantae
- Clade: Tracheophytes
- Clade: Angiosperms
- Clade: Eudicots
- Clade: Asterids
- Order: Asterales
- Family: Asteraceae
- Genus: Symphyotrichum
- Subgenus: Symphyotrichum subg. Astropolium
- Species: S. vahlii

Binomial name
- Symphyotrichum vahlii (Gaudich.) G.L.Nesom

Varieties
- S. vahlii var. vahlii; S. vahlii var. tenuifolium (Phil.) G.L.Nesom
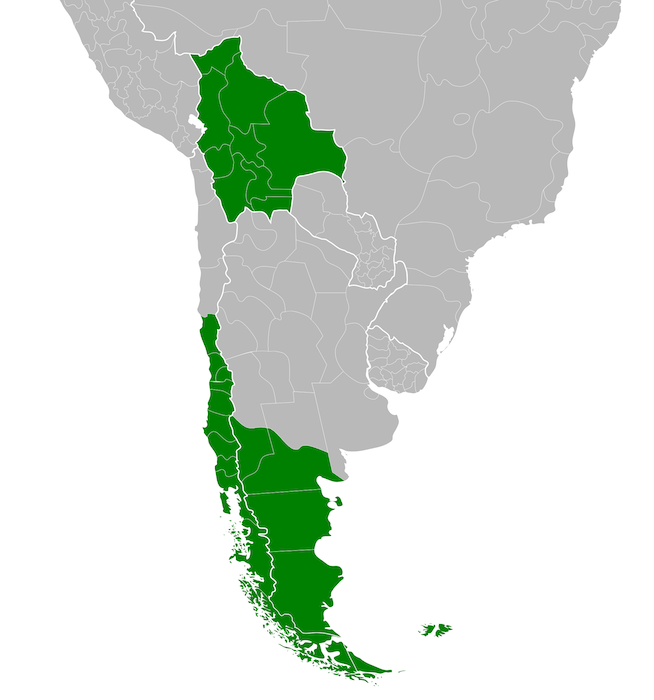
- Native distribution

Synonyms
- Basionym: Erigeron vahlii Gaudich.; Species: Aster vahlii Hook. & Arn.; Aster vahlii var. robustus De Wild.; Diplopappus pinifolius Less. ex DC.; Erigeron graminifolius Phil.; Erigeron vahlii var. robusta Albov; Oritrophium vahlii (Gaudich.) Cuatrec.; Thinobia araucana Phil.; Tripolium uniflorum Phil.

= Symphyotrichum vahlii =

Species of plant in the aster family

Symphyotrichum vahlii (formerly Aster vahlii and Erigeron vahlii) is a species of flowering plant in the family Asteraceae native to South America, specifically the countries of Bolivia, Chile, and Argentina, and on the Falkland Islands. It is herbaceous and grows 10 to 60 centimeters (4 to 24 inches) tall. Its flowers have white ray florets of length 6 millimeters (1/4 inch). It grows in wetland areas of tall forests with trees that exceed 15 meters (50 feet). One infraspecies is accepted, Symphyotrichum vahlii var. tenuifolium, in addition to the autonym S. vahlii var. vahlii.

== Description ==
Symphyotrichum vahlii is herbaceous and grows 10 to 60 centimeters (4 to 24 inches) tall. Its flowers have white ray florets of length 6 millimeters (1/4 inch).

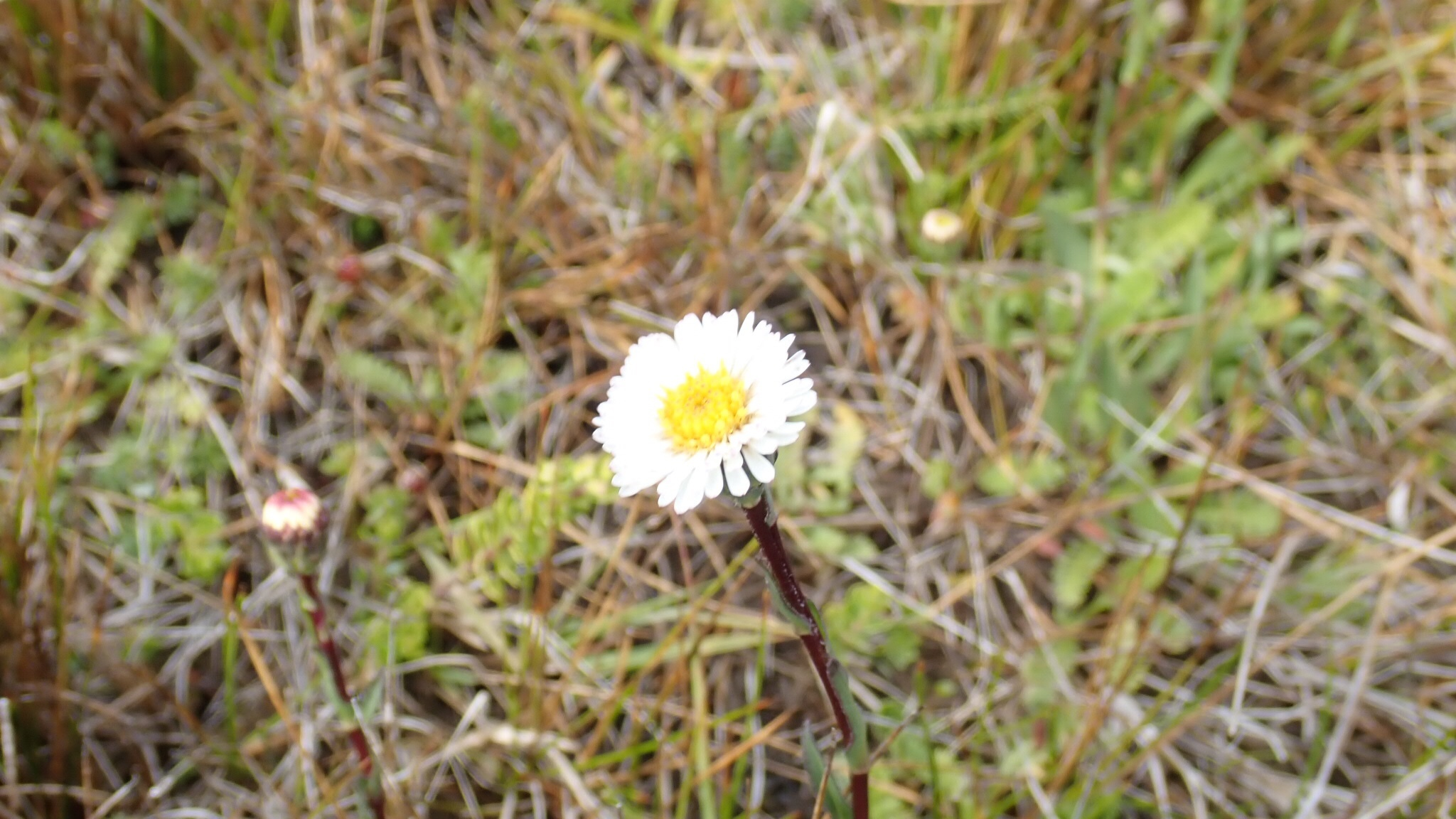

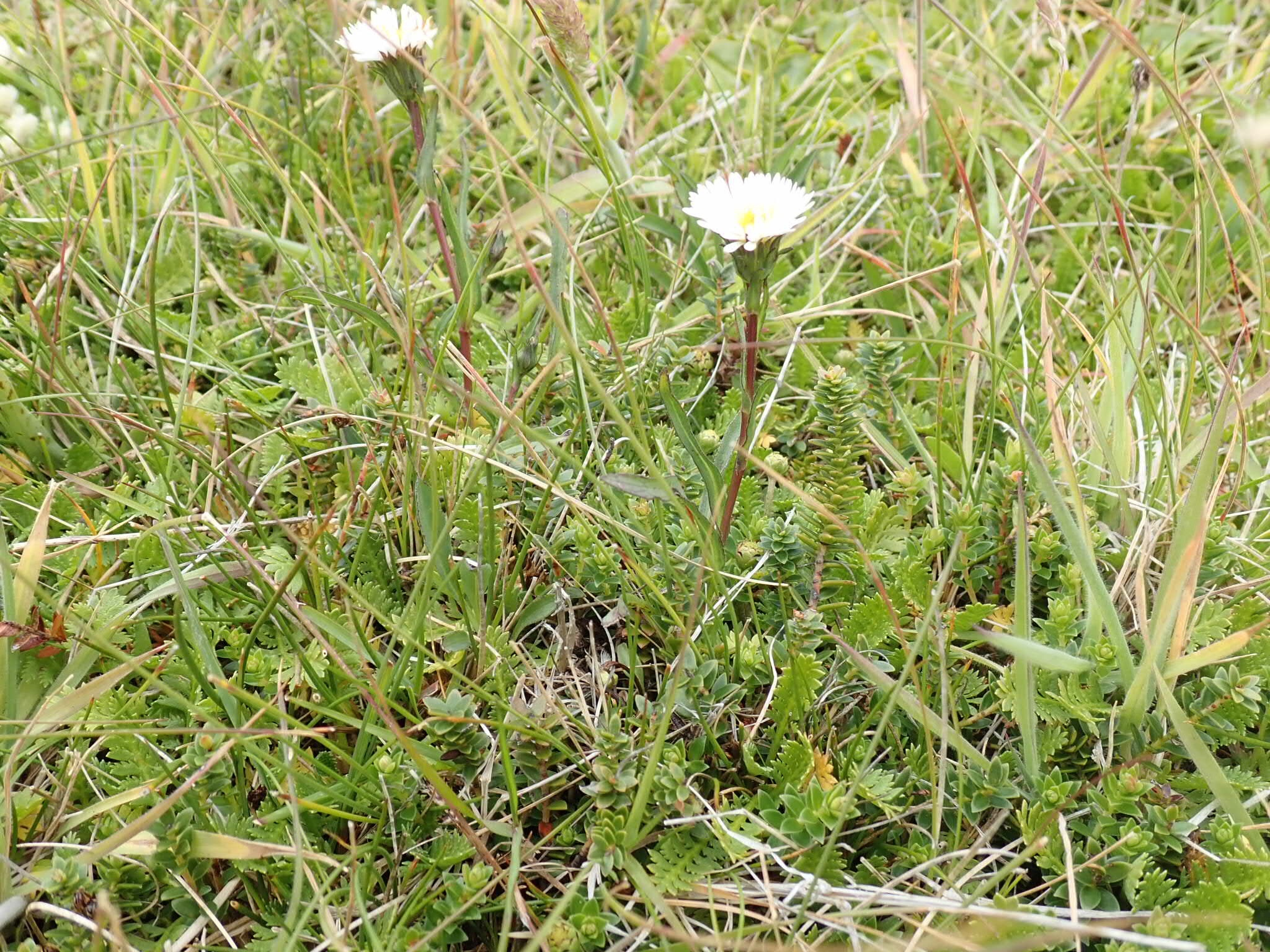

== Taxonomy ==
One infraspecies is accepted, Symphyotrichum vahlii var. tenuifolium, in addition to the autonym S. vahlii var. vahlii.

== Distribution and habitat ==
The species is native to South America, specifically the countries of Bolivia, Chile, and Argentina, and on the Falkland Islands. It grows in wetland areas of tall forests with trees that exceed 15 meters (50 feet).
