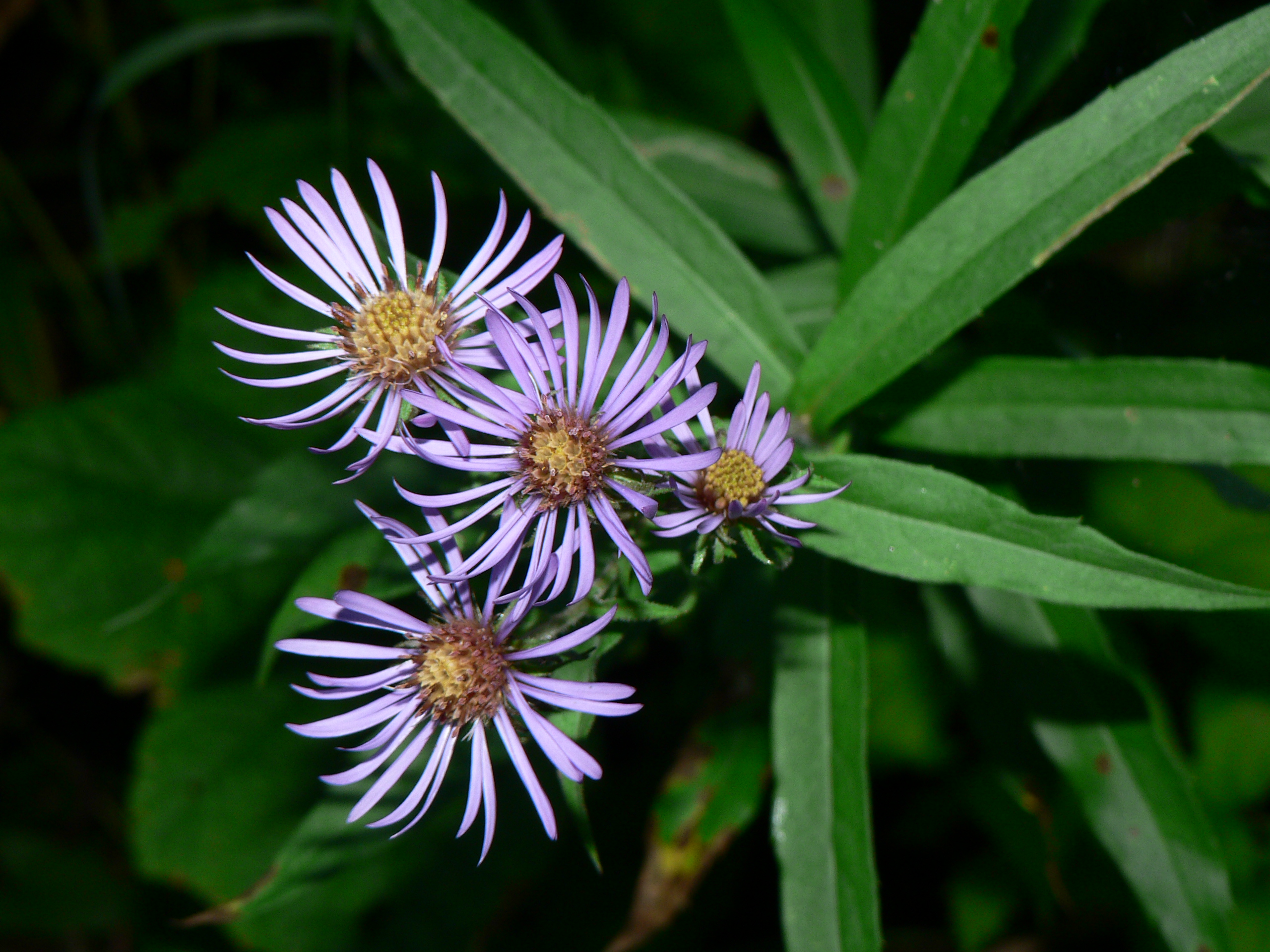

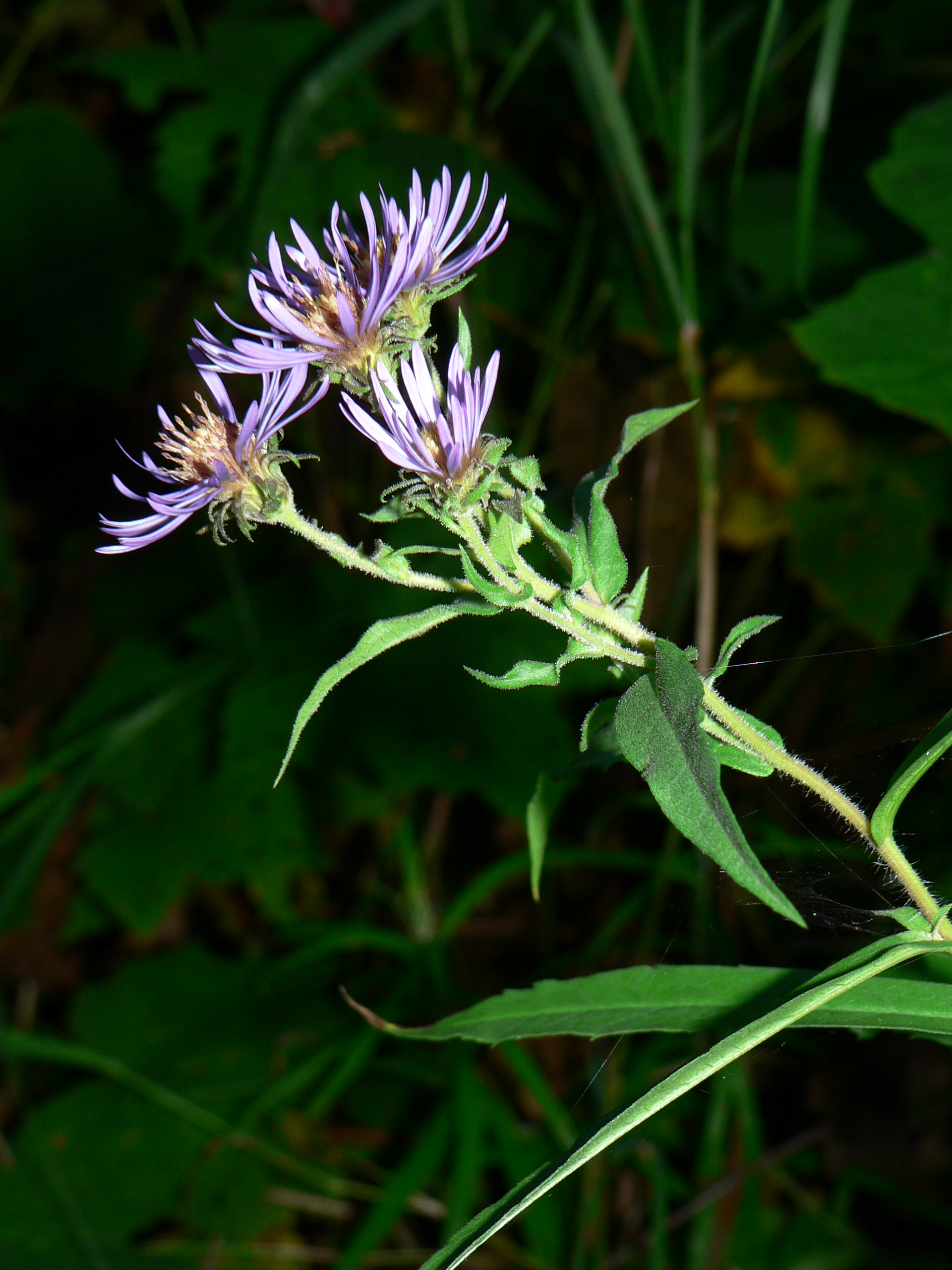

Scientific classification
- Kingdom: Plantae
- Clade: Tracheophytes
- Clade: Angiosperms
- Clade: Eudicots
- Clade: Asterids
- Order: Asterales
- Family: Asteraceae
- Subfamily: Asteroideae
- Tribe: Astereae
- Subtribe: Symphyotrichinae
- Genus: Canadanthus; G.L.Nesom
- Species: C. modestus

Binomial name
- Canadanthus modestus (Lindl.) G.L.Nesom

Synonyms
- Genus: Aster subg. Canadanthus (G.L.Nesom) Semple; Species: Aster modestus Lindl. (basionym); Aster major (Hook.) Porter; Aster majus (Hook.) Porter; Aster modestus var. major (Hook.) Muenscher; Aster mutatus Torr. & A.Gray; Aster sayianus Nutt.; Aster unalaschkensis var. major Hook.; Weberaster modestus (Lindl.) Á.Löve & D.Löve

= Canadanthus =

Genus of flowering plants

Canadanthus is a North American monotypic genus of flowering plants in the family Asteraceae. The only species is Canadanthus modestus (formerly Aster modestus), commonly known as great northern aster or western bog aster. It is native to most of Canada (Alberta, British Columbia, Manitoba, New Brunswick, Ontario, Saskatchewan, Quebec, and Yukon) and to northern parts of the United States (Alaska, Idaho, Michigan, Minnesota, Montana, North Dakota, Oregon, and Washington).

== Description ==
Canadanthus modestus is an herbaceous perennial spreading by means of underground rhizomes, thus producing large colonies. It has several flower heads, each with pink or purple ray florets and white or yellow disc florets.
