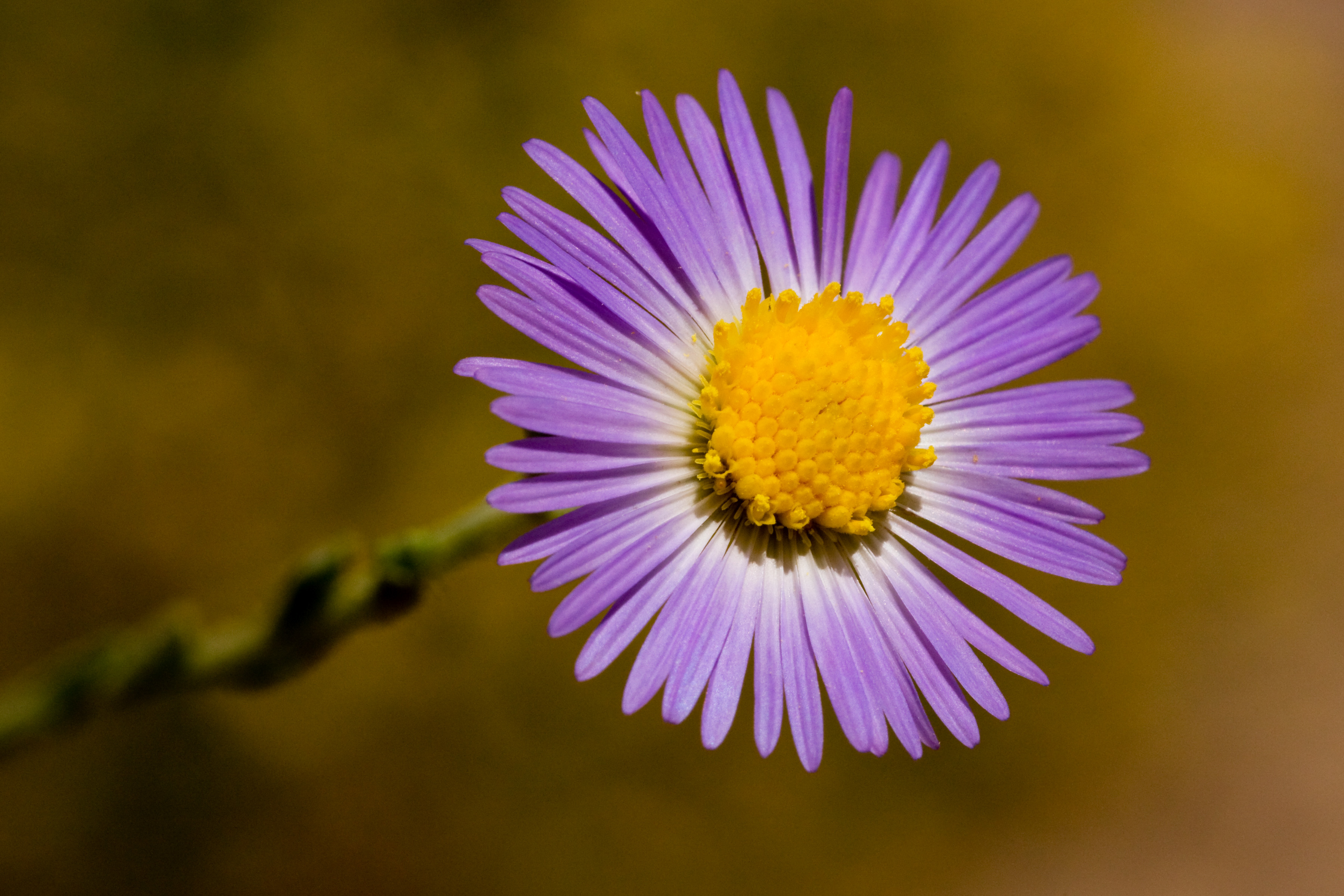
- Psilactis asteroides, Otero County, New Mexico

Scientific classification
- Kingdom: Plantae
- Clade: Embryophytes
- Clade: Tracheophytes
- Clade: Angiosperms
- Clade: Eudicots
- Clade: Asterids
- Order: Asterales
- Family: Asteraceae
- Subfamily: Asteroideae
- Tribe: Astereae
- Subtribe: Symphyotrichinae
- Genus: Psilactis; A.Gray

Type species
- Psilactis asteroides A.Gray

Species
- P. asteroides A.Gray; P. brevilingulata Sch.Bip. ex Hemsl.; P. gentryi (Standl.) D.R.Morgan; P. heterocarpa (R.L.Hartm. & M.A.Lane) D.R.Morgan; P. odysseus (G.L.Nesom) D.R.Morgan; P. tenuis S.Watson

Synonyms
- Machaeranthera Nees sect. Psilactis (A.Gray) B.L.Turner & D.B.Horne

= Psilactis =

Genus of flowering plants

Psilactis is a genus of North American and South American plants in the tribe Astereae within the family Asteraceae which are known by the common name tansyaster. There are six species within the genus.

== Taxonomy ==
The genus contains six species: Psilactis asteroides, Psilactis brevilingulata, Psilactis gentryi, Psilactis heterocarpa, Psilactis odysseus, and Psilactis tenuis. Formerly included in the genus were Psilactis coulteri and Psilactis crispa which are now placed in genus Leucosyris as L. coulteri and L. crispa, respectively. Additionally, Psilactis lepta has been determined to be a taxonymic synonym of Psilactis asteroides.

Accepted species of Psilactis
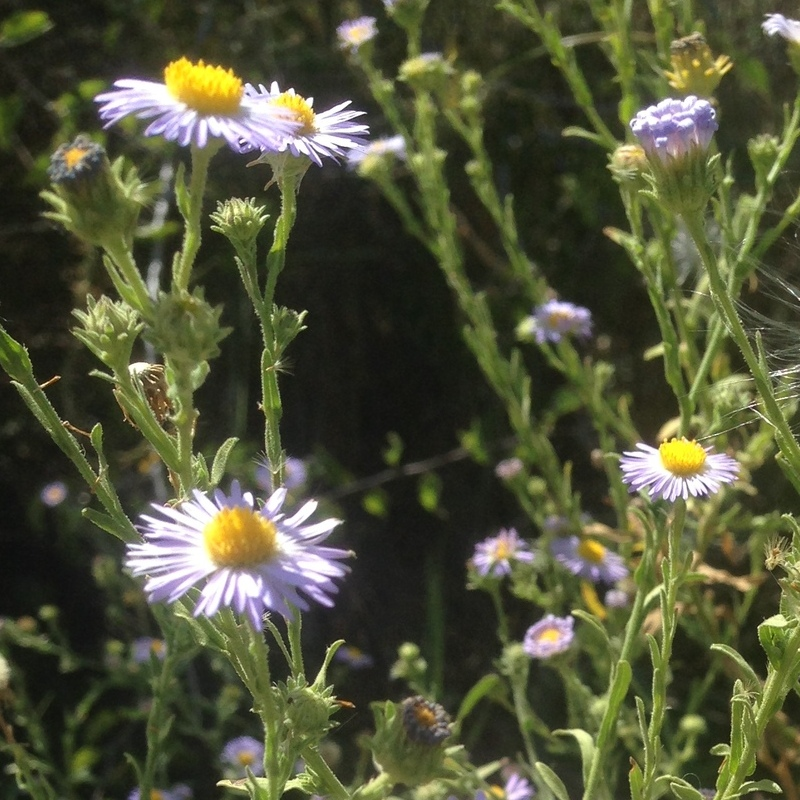
P. asteroides

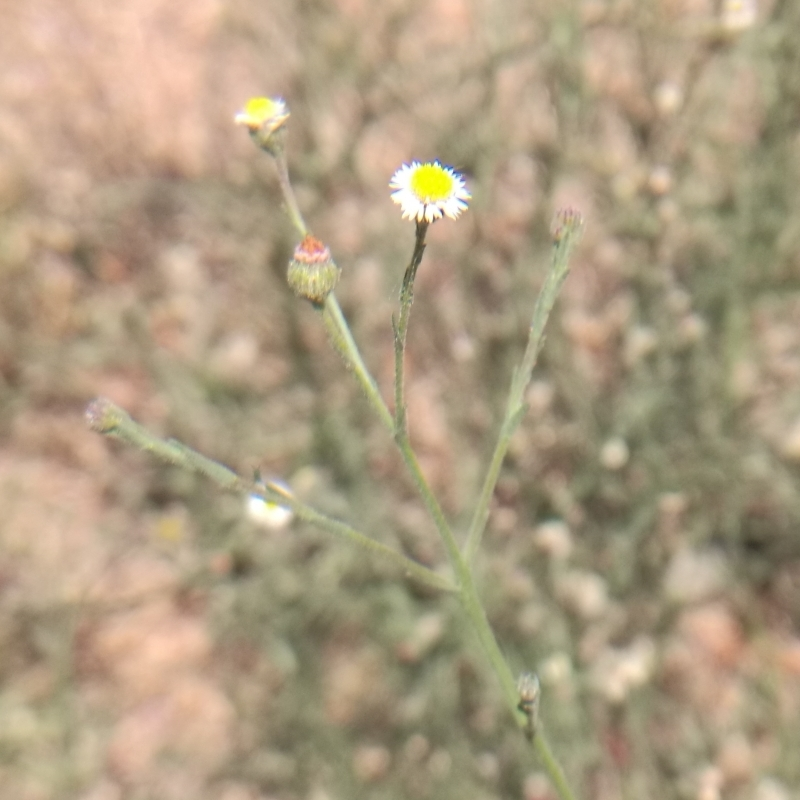
P. brevilingulata

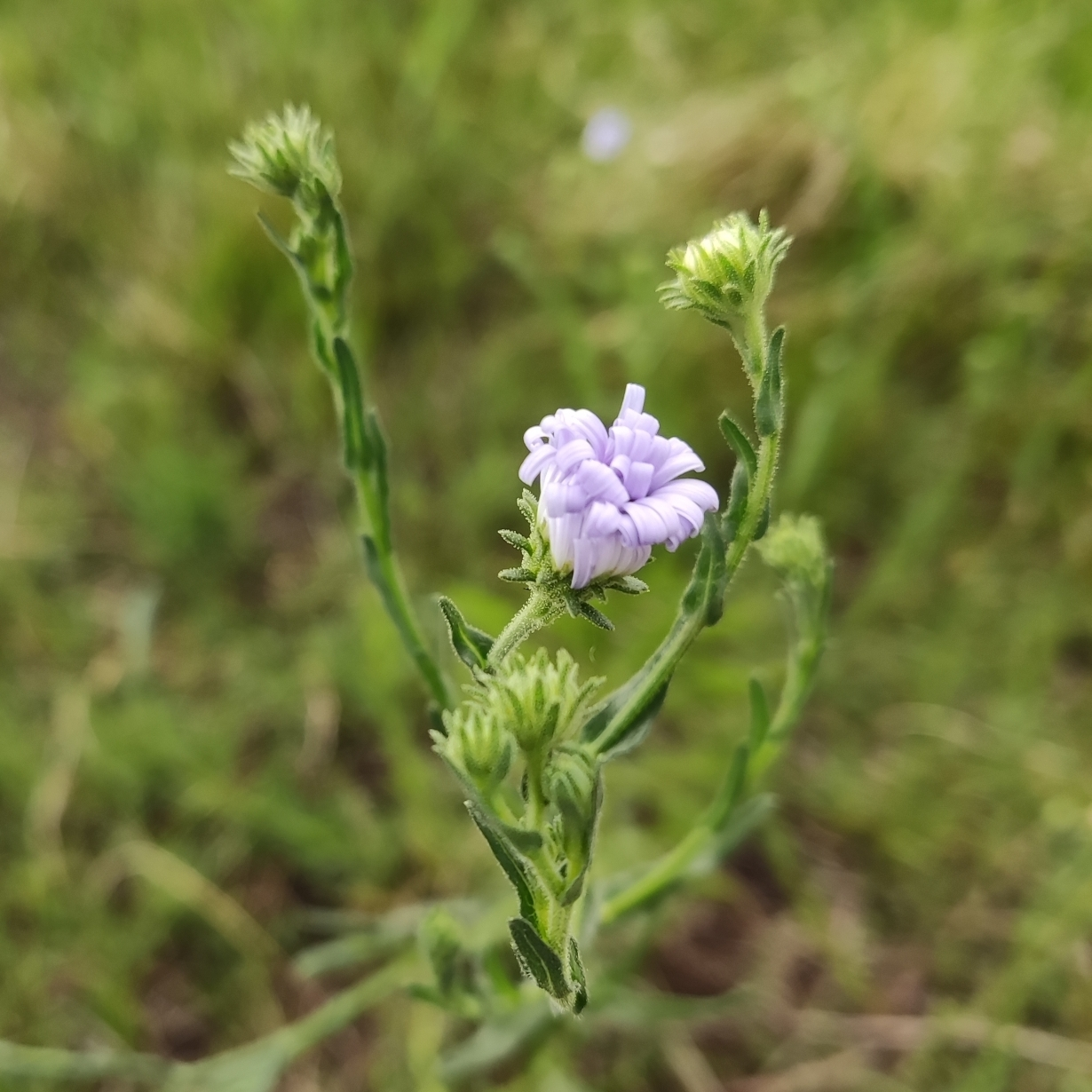
P. gentryi

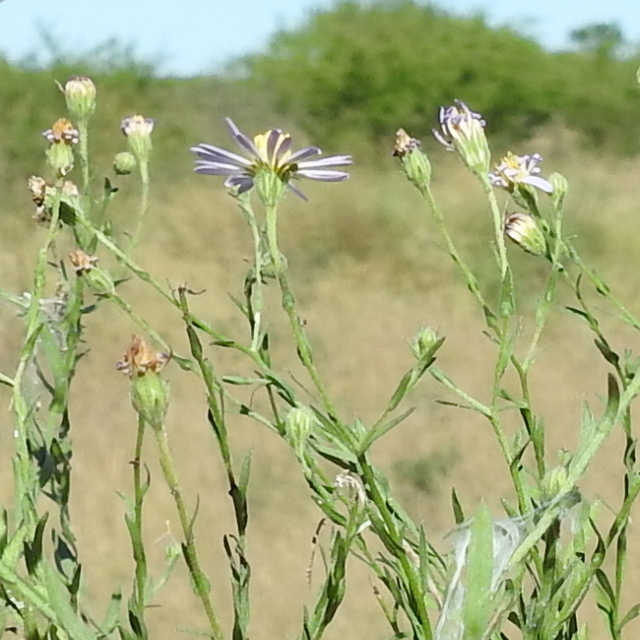
P. heterocarpa

== Distribution ==
Five species within the genus have native distribution in Mexico. Psilactis heterocarpa is restricted to Texas in the United States with no Mexican distribution. P. odysseus is restricted to the Mexican states Nuevo León and Tamaulipas, and the other four species, P. asteroides, P. brevilingulata, P. gentryi, and P. tenuis, have distributions in both Mexico and the United States. P. brevilingulata has an additional presence in Colombia and Peru.
