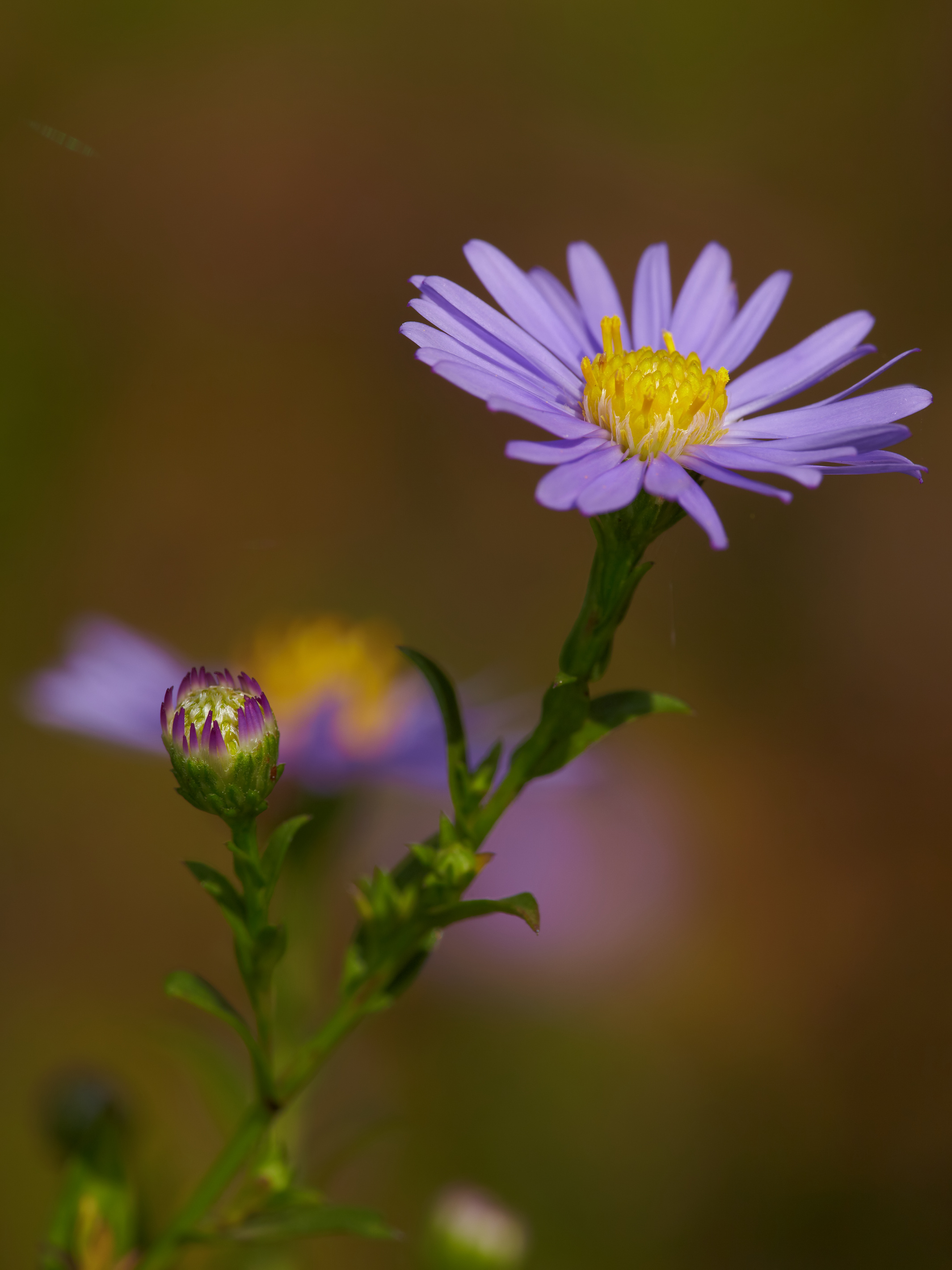
- Symphyotrichum novi-belgii

Scientific classification
- Kingdom: Plantae
- Clade: Embryophytes
- Clade: Tracheophytes
- Clade: Angiosperms
- Clade: Eudicots
- Clade: Asterids
- Order: Asterales
- Family: Asteraceae
- Subfamily: Asteroideae
- Tribe: Astereae
- Subtribe: Symphyotrichinae; G.L.Nesom

Type genus
- Symphyotrichum Nees

Genera
- Almutaster Á.Löve & D.Löve; Ampelaster G.L.Nesom; Canadanthus G.L.Nesom; Psilactis A.Gray; Sanrobertia G.L.Nesom; Symphyotrichum Nees

= Symphyotrichinae =

Subtribe of flowering plants

Symphyotrichinae is a subtribe of plants in the family Asteraceae containing six genera primarily of North American origin. In addition to Symphyotrichum, the largest and the type genus, the genera are Almutaster, Ampelaster, Canadanthus, Psilactis, and Sanrobertia.

== Classification ==
The following is a cladogram of the genera of subtribe Symphyotrichinae.

- Astereae
  - Symphyotrichinae
    - Canadanthus
    - - Ampelaster
      - - Sanrobertia
        - - - Almutaster
            - Psilactis
          - Symphyotrichum
  - (other subtribes)

Cladogram references
