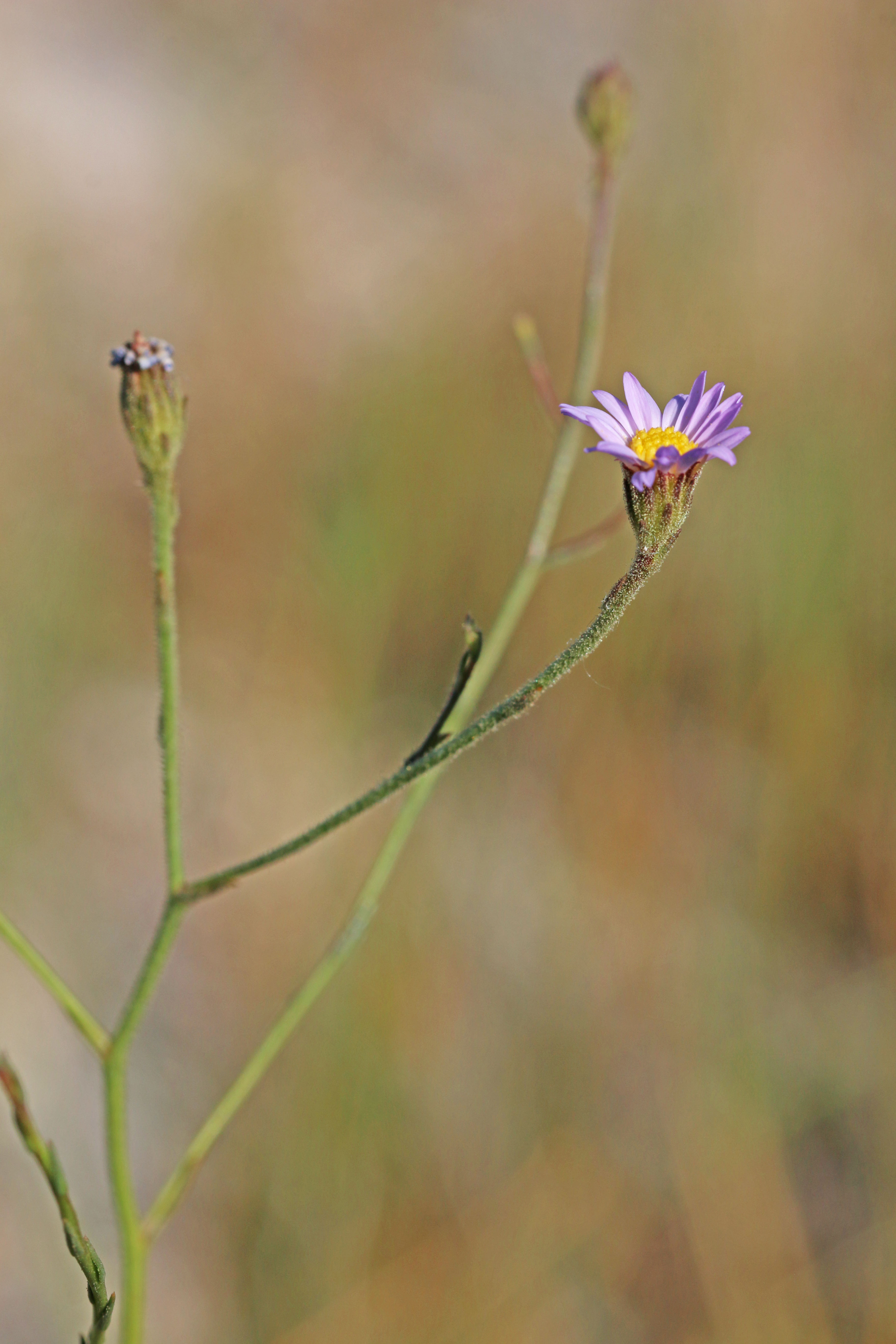

Conservation status
- Apparently Secure (NatureServe)

Scientific classification
- Kingdom: Plantae
- Clade: Embryophytes
- Clade: Tracheophytes
- Clade: Angiosperms
- Clade: Eudicots
- Clade: Asterids
- Order: Asterales
- Family: Asteraceae
- Subfamily: Asteroideae
- Tribe: Astereae
- Subtribe: Symphyotrichinae
- Genus: Almutaster; Á.Löve & D.Löve
- Species: A. pauciflorus

Binomial name
- Almutaster pauciflorus (Nutt.) Á.Löve & D.Löve

Synonyms
- Aster hydrophilus Greene ex Wooton & Standl.; Aster pauciflorus Nutt.; Tripolium pauciflorum (Nutt.) DC.

= Almutaster =

Genus of flowering plants

Almutaster is a North American genus of plants in the family Asteraceae containing the single species Almutaster pauciflorus (formerly Aster pauciflorus), which is known by the common name alkali marsh aster. It is native to Canada (Northwest Territories and the three Prairie Provinces), the Western United States, and northern and central Mexico (as far south as Tlaxcala). The genus is named for botanist Almut Gitter Jones.

Almutaster pauciflorus grows in wet alkaline and saline soils such as inland salt marshes and salt flats. This is a perennial herb growing a reddish-green glandular stem to heights from 30 to 120 centimeters. The narrow leaves are linear in shape and up to 10 centimeters long. The inflorescence is an open array of flower heads containing white to pale purple ray florets and a center of yellow disc florets. The head is lined with phyllaries covered in tiny white resin glands. The fruit is a hairy cypsela.

The inflorescences are a food source for adult Lepidoptera, although they may not be the principal pollinators.
