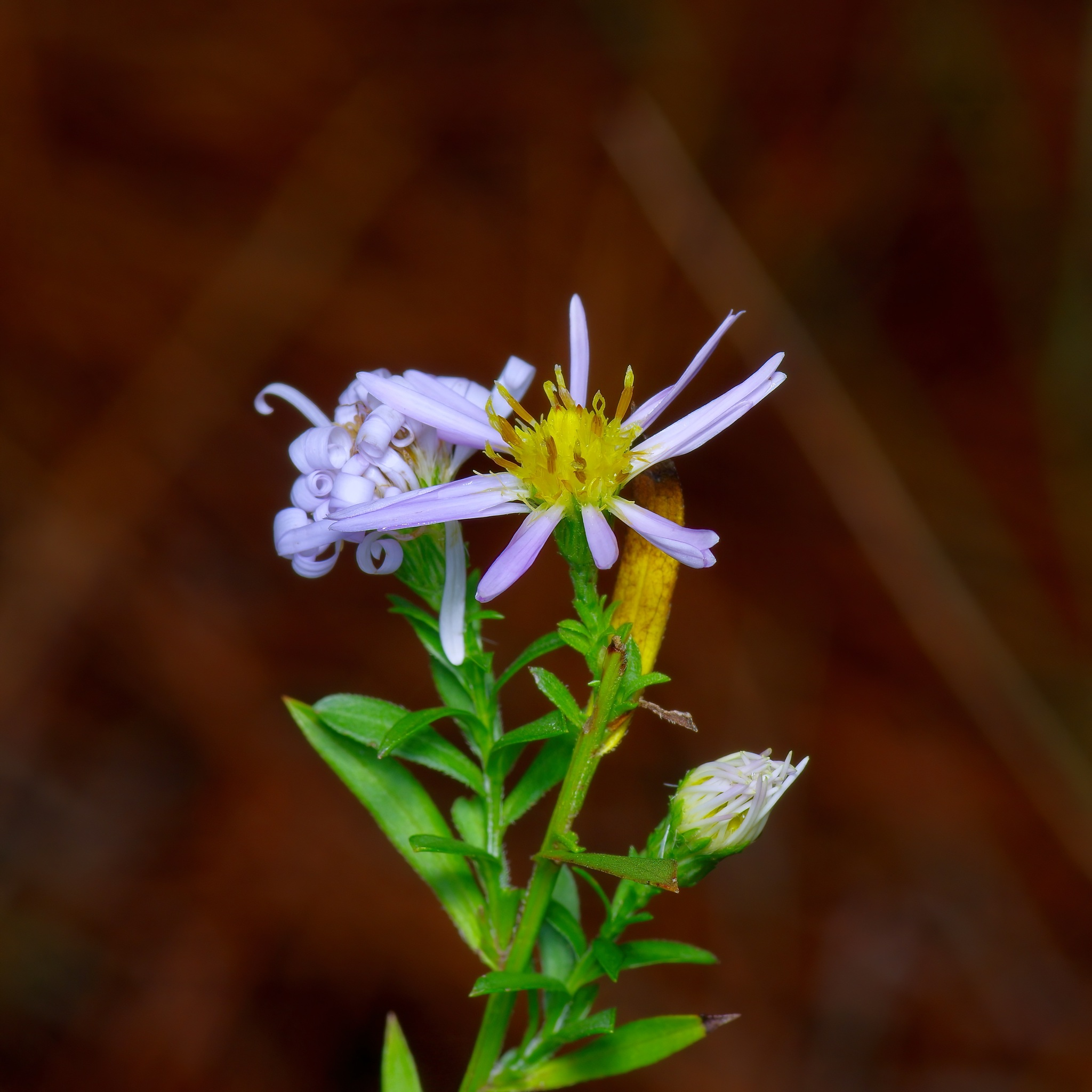

Conservation status
- Apparently Secure (NatureServe)

Scientific classification
- Kingdom: Plantae
- Clade: Tracheophytes
- Clade: Angiosperms
- Clade: Eudicots
- Clade: Asterids
- Order: Asterales
- Family: Asteraceae
- Genus: Symphyotrichum
- Section: Symphyotrichum sect. Symphyotrichum
- Species: S. eulae

Binomial name
- Symphyotrichum eulae (Shinners) G.L.Nesom
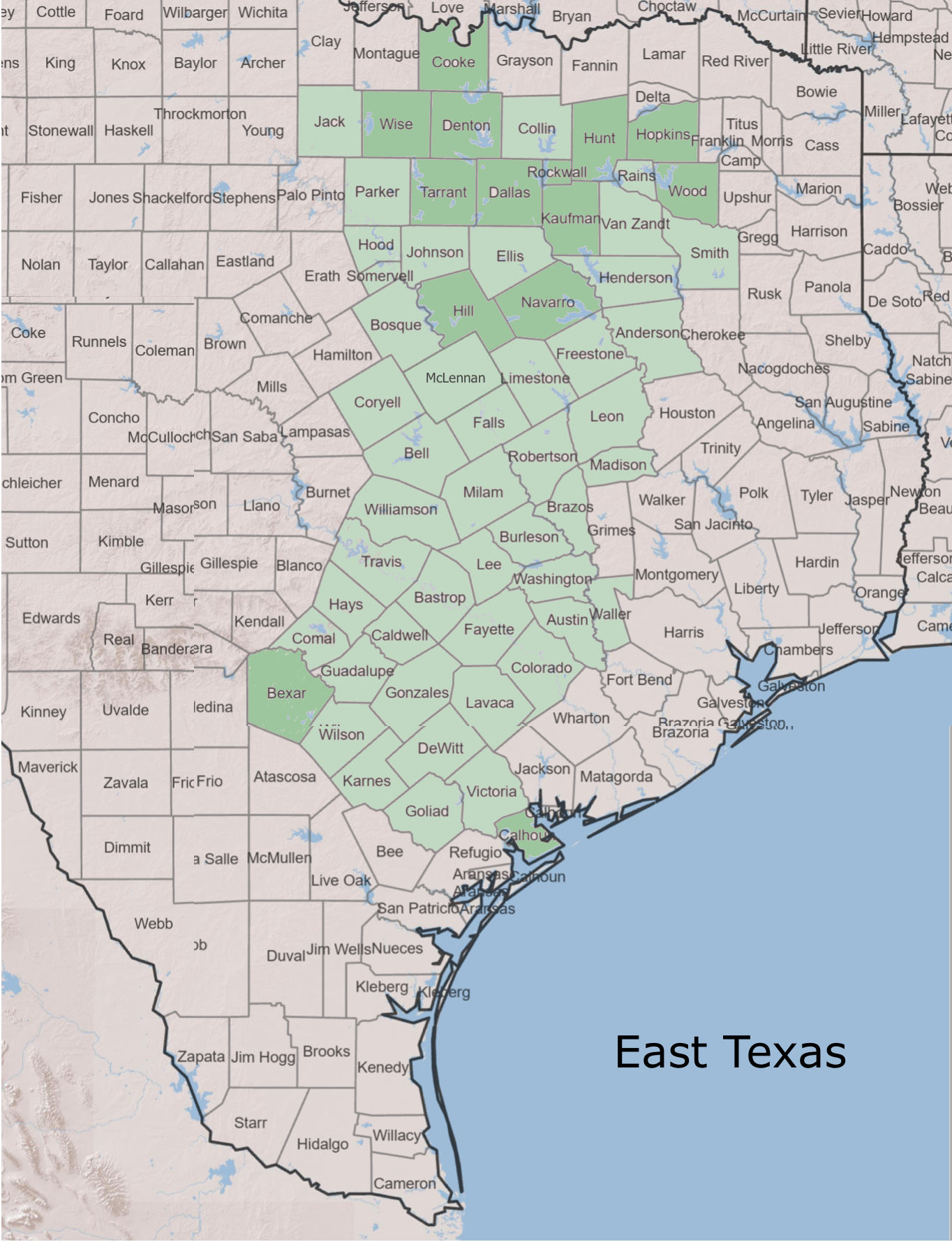
- Endemic to Texas (Note: This is a county map of east central Texas showing the range of S. eulae as described by Lloyd Herbert Shinners. Darker green shaded counties were in Shinners' 1950 protologue of Aster eulae. Lighter green shaded counties are within the area covered by Shinners' description. Darker green counties are, alphabetically, as follows: Bexar, Calhoun, Cooke, Dallas, Denton, Hill, Hunt, Kaufman, Navarro, Rockwall, Tarrant, Wise, and Wood. The following counties are shaded lighter green because they are within Shinners' range but are not specifically named by him: Anderson, Austin, Bastrop, Bell, Bosque, Brazos, Burleson, Caldwell, Collin, Colorado, Comal, Coryell, DeWitt, Ellis, Falls, Fayette, Freestone, Goliad, Gonzales, Guadalupe, Hays, Henderson, Hood, Jack, Johnson, Karnes, Lavaca, Lee, Leon, Limestone, Madison, McLennan, Milam, Parker, Rains, Robertson, Smith, Somervell, Travis, Van Zandt, Victoria, Waller, and Washington. Williamson, and Wilson. Only McLennan County is green on the S. eulae page in the USDA PLANTS database.)

Synonyms
- Aster eulae Shinners

= Symphyotrichum eulae =

Species of flowering plant in the aster family

Symphyotrichum eulae (formerly Aster eulae) is a species of flowering plant in the family Asteraceae endemic to Texas. The common names Eula's aster and Texas aster have been used. It is a perennial, herbaceous plant that may reach 5 to 150 centimeters (2 to 59 inches) in height. Its flowers have white to bluish or lavender-white ray florets and yellow then reddish to brown disk florets. It was named for Eula Whitehouse, American botanist, botanical illustrator, and plant collector.

== Description ==
S. eulae is a perennial, herbaceous plant that may reach heights between 5 and 150 centimeters (2 and 59 inches). It grows from a long and thick rhizome and forms colonies of plants that each have one to three or more erect, straight, and stout glabrous (hairless) stems. Its flowers have white to bluish or lavender-white ray florets and yellow then reddish to brown disk florets.

=== Chromosomes ===
It has a monoploid number (also called base number) of eight chromosomes (x = 8). The species is hexaploid with six sets of the chromosomes for a total chromosome count of 48.

== Taxonomy ==
=== Etymology ===
Symphyotrichum eulae was named by Shinners for Eula Whitehouse, American botanist, botanical illustrator, and plant collector. The common names Eula's aster and Texas aster have been used.

=== Classification ===
Symphyotrichum eulae is classified in the subgenus Symphyotrichum, section Symphyotrichum, subsection Dumosi. It is one of the "bushy asters and relatives." Its basionym (original scientific name) is Aster eulae, and its name with author citations is Symphyotrichum eulae (Shinners) G.L.Nesom. Botanist Lloyd Herbert Shinners described the species in 1950, classifying it within the genus Aster.

Placement within Symphyotrichum subg. Symphyotrichum
- - Symphyotrichum subg. Symphyotrichum
    - sect. Conyzopsis
      - S. ciliatum
      - S. frondosum
      - S. laurentianum
    - sect. Occidentales
      - S. chilense
      - S. eatonii
      - S. foliaceum
      - S. greatae
      - S. hallii
      - S. hendersonii
      - S. jessicae
      - S. lentum
      - S. molle
      - S. spathulatum
      - S. subspicatum
    - sect. Turbinelli
      S. turbinellum
    - sect. Symphyotrichum
      - ssect. Dumosi
        - S. boreale
        - S. bullatum
        - S. burgessii
        - S. carnerosanum
        - S. dumosum
        - S. eulae
        - S. lanceolatum
        - S. lateriflorum
        - S. leone
        - S. nahanniense
        - S. ontarionis
        - S. praealtum
        - S. racemosum
        - S. schaffneri
        - S. simmondsii
        - S. tradescantii
        - S. welshii
      - ssect. Heterophylli
        - ser. Concinni
          - S. laeve
          - S. oolentangiense
        - ser. Cordifolii
          - S. anomalum
          - S. ciliolatum
          - S. cordifolium
          - S. drummondii
          - S. shortii
          - S. undulatum
          - S. urophyllum
      - ssect. Porteriani
        - S. depauperatum
        - S. kentuckiense
        - S. parviceps
        - S. pilosum
        - S. porteri
      - ssect. Symphyotrichum
        - ser. Punicei
          - S. elliottii
          - S. firmum
          - S. prenanthoides
          - S. puniceum
          - S. rhiannon
        - ser. Symphyotrichum
          - S. anticostense
          - S. novi-belgii
          - S. retroflexum
          - S. robynsianum
  Cladogram references

== Distribution and habitat ==
Symphyotrichum eulae is endemic to Texas. Shinners reported that it had been found in the Texas counties of Bexar, Calhoun, Cooke, Dallas, Denton, Hill, Hunt, Kaufman, Navarro, Rockwall, Tarrant, Wise, and Wood. In his 1950 protologue for the species, he said that it was "Common in north central Texas, from Hopkins and Wood west to Cooke and Wise counties; extending south to Bexar and Calhoun counties".

The species is found in semi-shaded clay or sandy clay soils at elevations up to 100 meters (330 feet).

== Conservation ==
As of January 2023, NatureServe listed Symphyotrichum eulae as Apparently Secure (G4) globally and the same (S4) in Texas. Data was provided by the Texas Parks and Wildlife Department Wildlife Diversity Branch. The global status of S. eulae was last reviewed by NatureServe on 1 February 1994.
