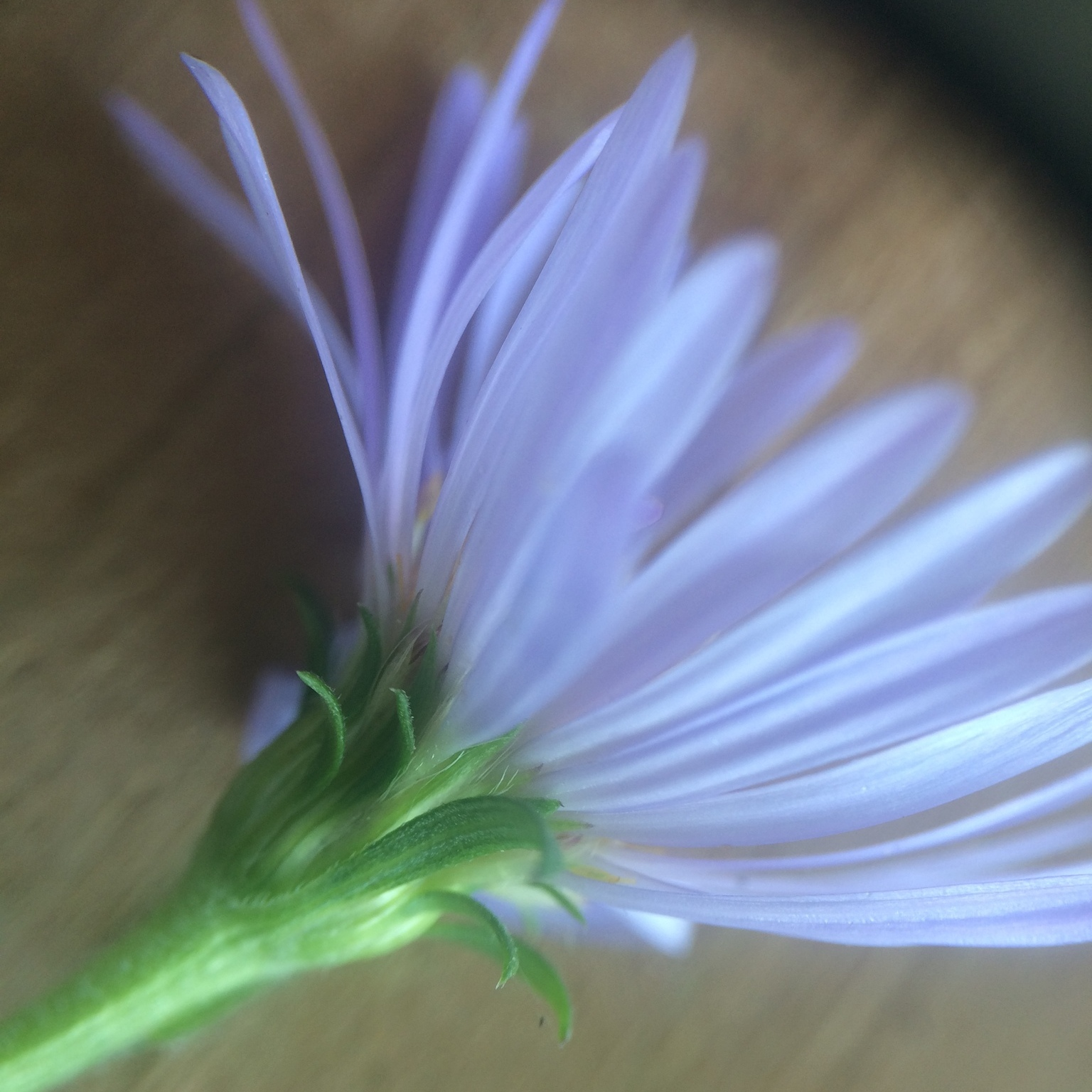
- Symphyotrichum anticostense in Quebec

Conservation status
- Vulnerable (NatureServe)

Scientific classification
- Kingdom: Plantae
- Clade: Tracheophytes
- Clade: Angiosperms
- Clade: Eudicots
- Clade: Asterids
- Order: Asterales
- Family: Asteraceae
- Subtribe: Symphyotrichinae
- Genus: Symphyotrichum
- Subgenus: Symphyotrichum subg. Symphyotrichum
- Section: Symphyotrichum sect. Symphyotrichum
- Species: S. anticostense

Binomial name
- Symphyotrichum anticostense (Fernald) G.L.Nesom
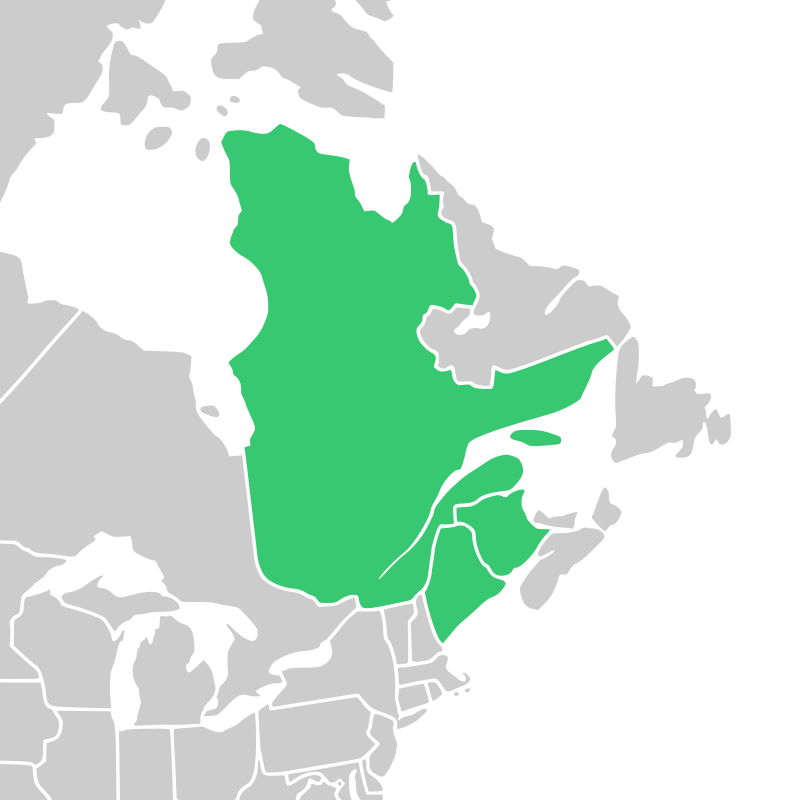
- Native distribution

Synonyms
- Aster anticostensis Fernald; Aster gaspensis Vict.; Aster hesperius var. gaspensis (Vict.) B.Boivin

= Symphyotrichum anticostense =

Species of plant in the aster family

Symphyotrichum anticostense (formerly Aster anticostensis) is a species of flowering plant in the family Asteraceae with the common name of Anticosti aster. It is endemic to Quebec, New Brunswick, and Maine. S. anticostense is a perennial, herbaceous plant that may reach 10 to 90 centimeters (4 to 35 inches) in height. Its flowers have pale purple or lilac, sometimes white, ray florets and yellow, then reddish purple, disk florets.

== Description ==
Symphyotrichum anticostense is a perennial, herbaceous plant that may reach 10 to 90 centimeters (4 to 35 inches) in height. It grows in clonal colonies from long rhizomes, each which produces one erect, red-toned, and hairless stem. Its flower heads are found in long and somewhat racemiform arrays. The involucre of each flower head is bell-shaped and 6–10 millimeters (0.24–0.39 inches) long. Its flowers have 25–44 pale purple or lilac, sometimes white, ray florets, size 9.5–20 mm (0.37–0.79 in) long by 0.7–1.4 mm (0.028–0.055 in) wide. The ray florets surround 29–52 yellow, maturing to reddish-purple, disk florets.

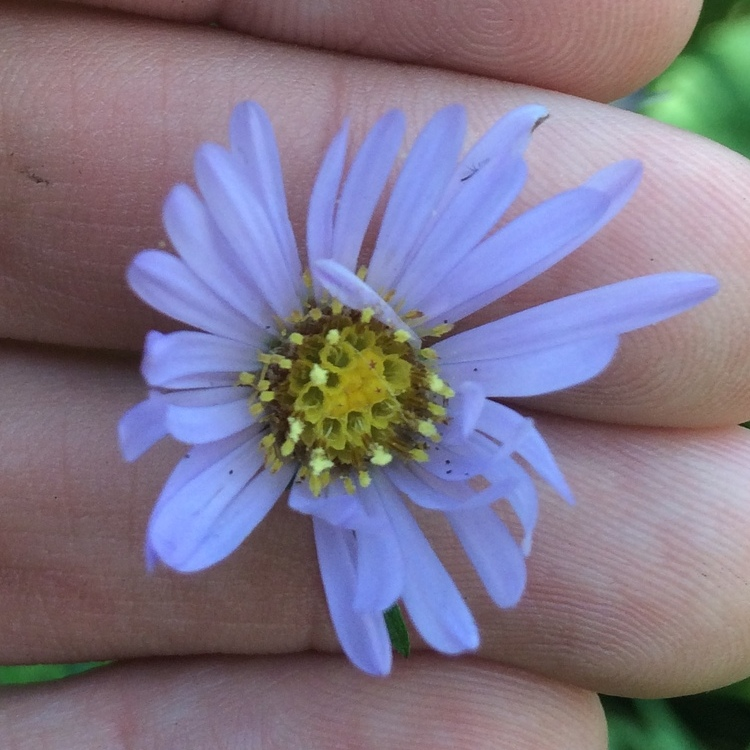
S. anticostense floret view

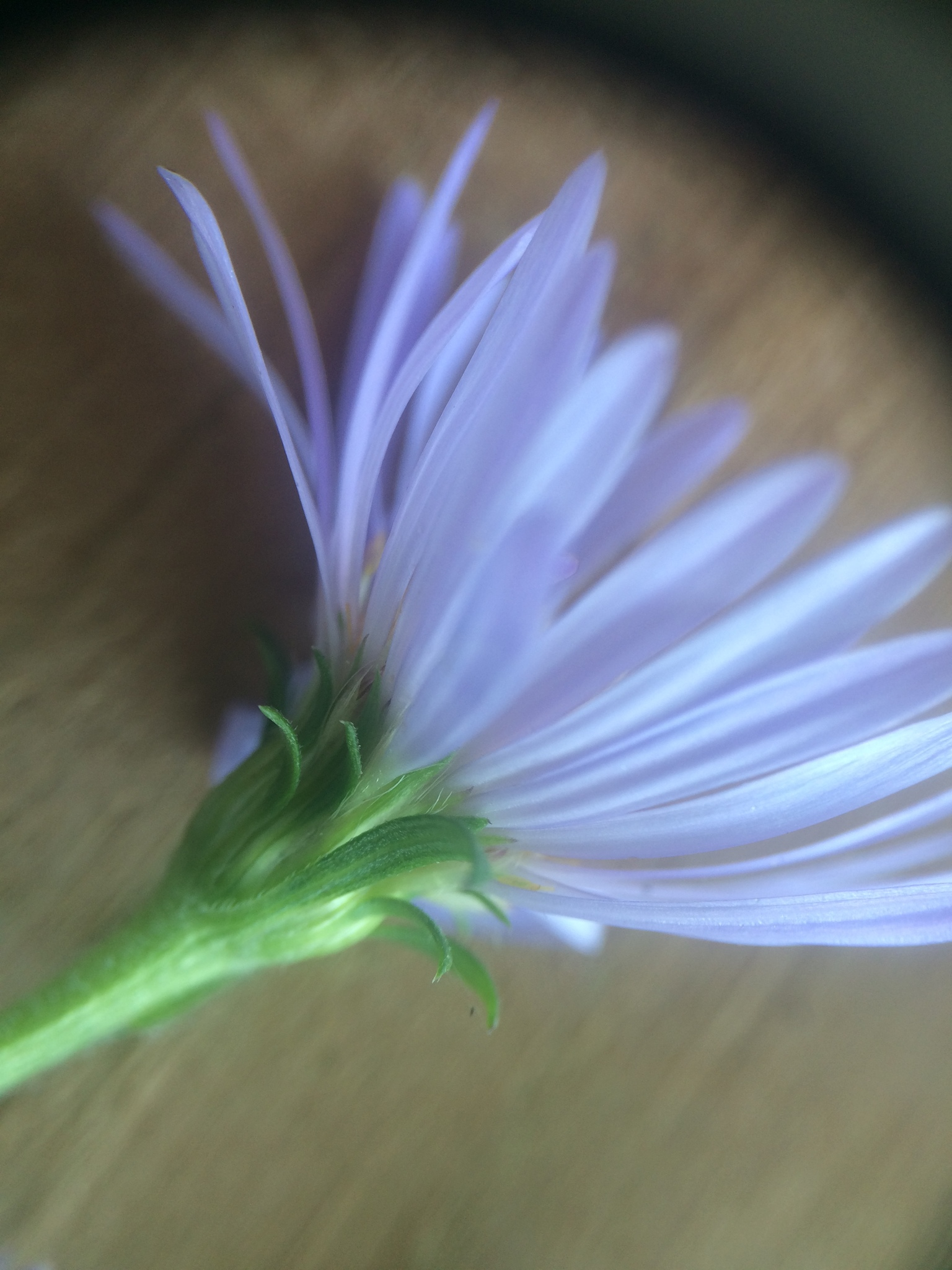
S. anticostense involucre and phyllaries

== Taxonomy ==
Symphyotrichum anticostense is classified in the subgenus Symphyotrichum, section Symphyotrichum, subsection Symphyotrichum. The species' common name is "Anticosti aster".

Placement within Symphyotrichum subg. Symphyotrichum
- - Symphyotrichum subg. Symphyotrichum
    - sect. Conyzopsis
      - S. ciliatum
      - S. frondosum
      - S. laurentianum
    - sect. Occidentales
      - S. chilense
      - S. eatonii
      - S. foliaceum
      - S. greatae
      - S. hallii
      - S. hendersonii
      - S. jessicae
      - S. lentum
      - S. molle
      - S. spathulatum
      - S. subspicatum
    - sect. Turbinelli
      S. turbinellum
    - sect. Symphyotrichum
      - ssect. Dumosi
        - S. boreale
        - S. bullatum
        - S. burgessii
        - S. carnerosanum
        - S. dumosum
        - S. eulae
        - S. lanceolatum
        - S. lateriflorum
        - S. leone
        - S. nahanniense
        - S. ontarionis
        - S. praealtum
        - S. racemosum
        - S. schaffneri
        - S. simmondsii
        - S. tradescantii
        - S. welshii
      - ssect. Heterophylli
        - ser. Concinni
          - S. laeve
          - S. oolentangiense
        - ser. Cordifolii
          - S. anomalum
          - S. ciliolatum
          - S. cordifolium
          - S. drummondii
          - S. shortii
          - S. undulatum
          - S. urophyllum
      - ssect. Porteriani
        - S. depauperatum
        - S. kentuckiense
        - S. parviceps
        - S. pilosum
        - S. porteri
      - ssect. Symphyotrichum
        - ser. Punicei
          - S. elliottii
          - S. firmum
          - S. prenanthoides
          - S. puniceum
          - S. rhiannon
        - ser. Symphyotrichum
          - S. anticostense
          - S. novi-belgii
          - S. retroflexum
          - S. robynsianum
  Cladogram references

== Distribution and habitat ==
Symphyotrichum anticostense is endemic to Quebec, New Brunswick, and Maine. It is a river and lake gravel shore plant that is conditioned to these calcareous habitats.

== Conservation ==
Symphyotrichum anticostense is vulnerable for reasons including erosion, deer browsing, and invasive species encroachment. In Maine, it is critically endangered.
