= Eula Whitehouse =

American botanist (1892–1974)

- Born: August 1, 1892; Cleburne, Texas
- Died: September 6, 1974 (aged 82)
- Education: University of Texas at Austin
- Occupations: Botanist, botanical illustrator

Eula Whitehouse (1892–1974) was an American botanist, botanical illustrator, and plant collector known for gathering specimens from Africa, Hawaii, Australia, New Zealand, Cyprus, India, Singapore, Fiji, and Mexico.

== Life and work ==
Whitehouse was born in Cleburne, Texas, on August 1, 1892 and attended University of Texas at Austin, earning a B.A. in 1918 and M.S. in 1931 with a thesis, titled Ecology of Enchanted Rock Vegetation. She completed her PhD in 1939 with a doctoral dissertation titled, A Study of the Annual Phlox Species. At the time, her educational accomplishments were rare as she was among the only 429 women in America to finish her Ph.D. between 1939 and 1940.

She worked in North and Central Texas, first as an instructor at the University of Texas College of Mines (1931–1934), curator of Botany and Zoology at Texas Memorial Museum at Austin (1938–1943), and as a schoolteacher in Electra, Texas (1944–1946).

She worked at Southern Methodist University as a botany professor, head of the herbarium, and curator of the plant cryptogams. The standard author abbreviation Whitehouse is used to indicate this person as the author when citing a botanical name. Her collection of botanical books formed an initial part of the library at the Botanical Research Institute of Texas.

Whitehouse was listed in Who’s Who of American Women (in 1959) and American Men of Science (in 1944), apparently because, at that time, publications were lacking that honored women in science. (In 1971, its name was changed to American Men and Women of Science.)

== Selected works ==
In 1936, Whitehouse authored and illustrated Texas Flowers in Natural Colors. it was one of the first books devoted to Texas wildflowers
