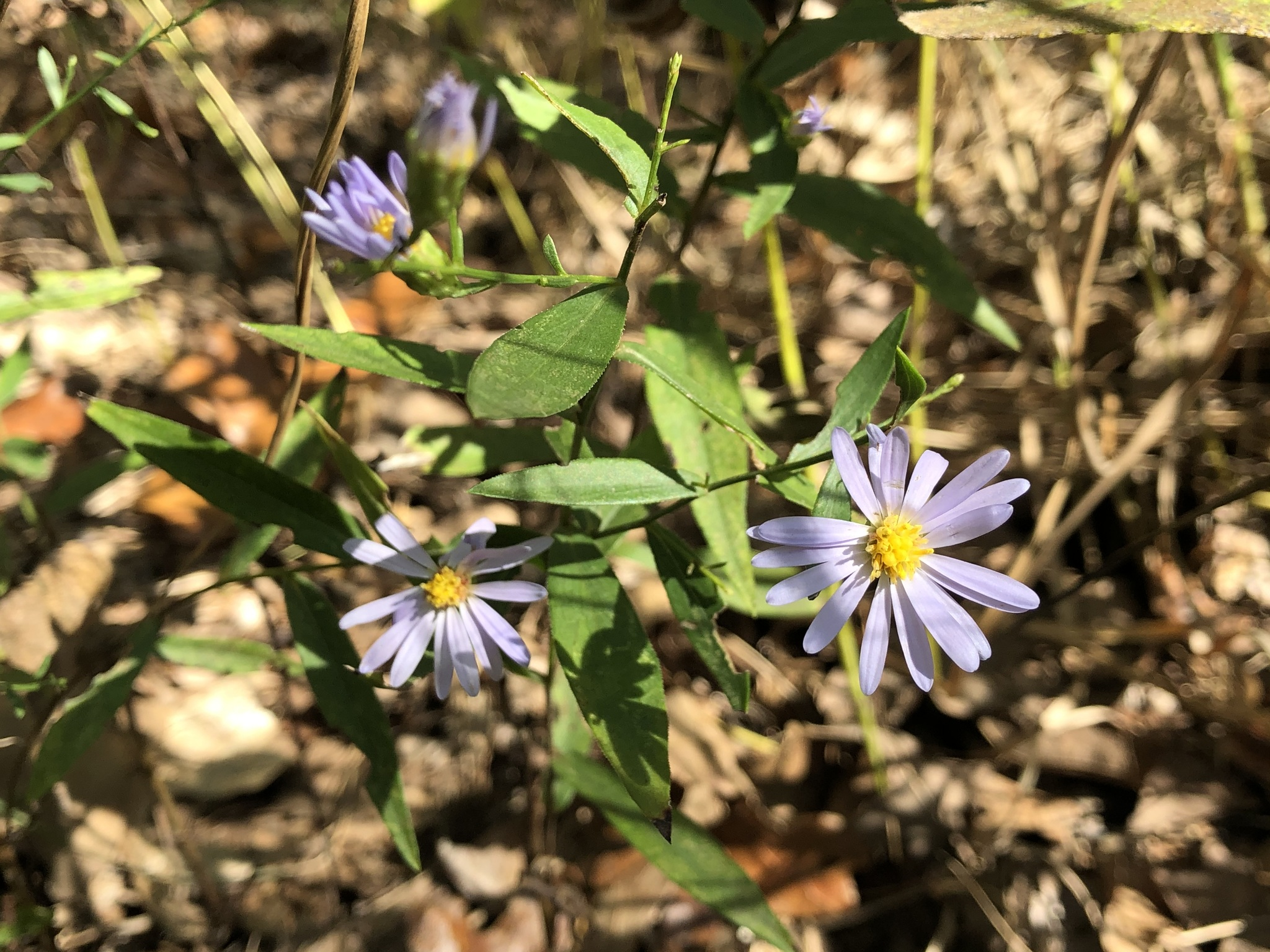

Conservation status
- Apparently Secure (NatureServe)

Scientific classification
- Kingdom: Plantae
- Clade: Tracheophytes
- Clade: Angiosperms
- Clade: Eudicots
- Clade: Asterids
- Order: Asterales
- Family: Asteraceae
- Tribe: Astereae
- Subtribe: Symphyotrichinae
- Genus: Symphyotrichum
- Subgenus: Symphyotrichum subg. Symphyotrichum
- Section: Symphyotrichum sect. Symphyotrichum
- Species: S. turbinellum

Binomial name
- Symphyotrichum turbinellum (Lindl.) G.L.Nesom
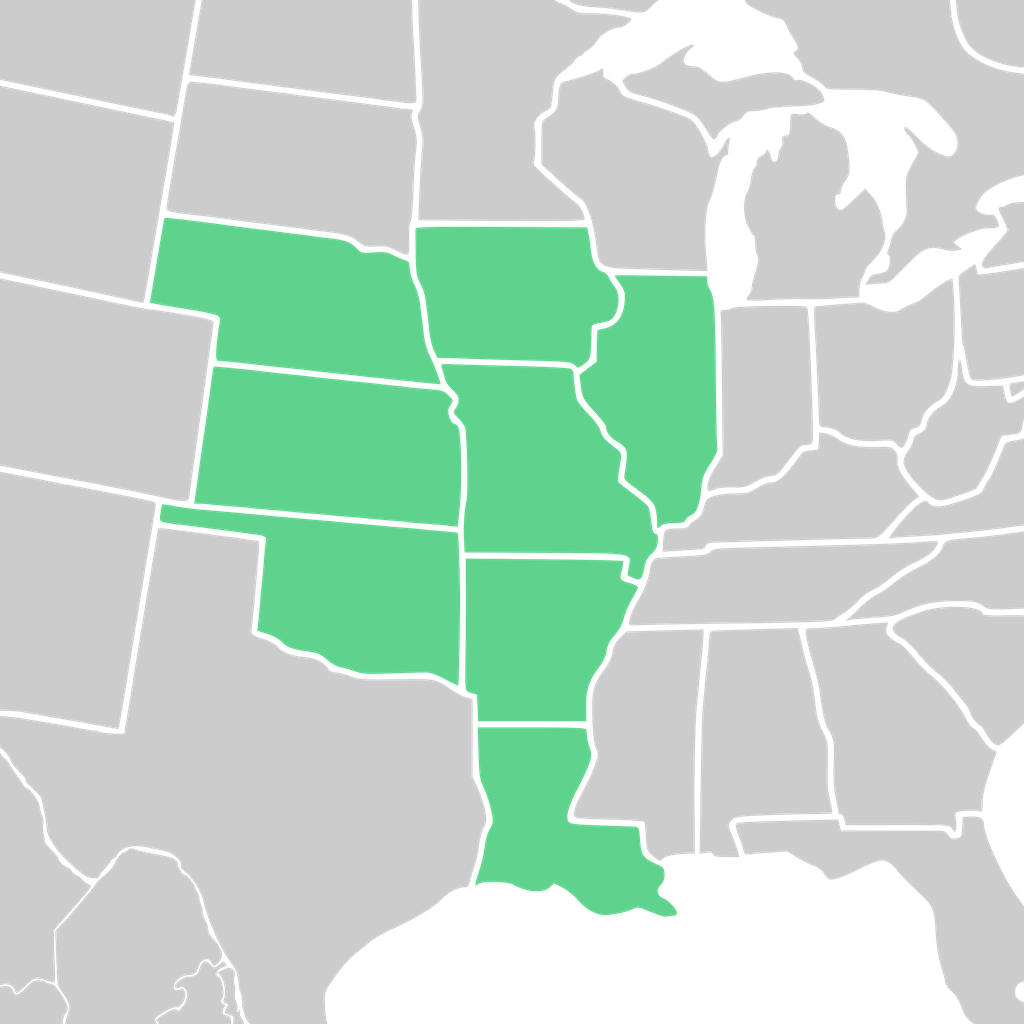
- Native distribution primarily in the Ozarks

Synonyms
- Aster turbinellus Lindl.

= Symphyotrichum turbinellum =

Species of plant in the aster family

Symphyotrichum turbinellum (formerly Aster turbinellus), with the common names of prairie aster, smooth violet prairie aster, and mauve-flowered starwort, is a species of perennial flowering plant in the family Asteraceae native to the United States in Arkansas, Illinois, Iowa, Kansas, Louisiana, Missouri, Nebraska, and Oklahoma, primarily in the Ozarks. It has gained the Royal Horticultural Society's Award of Garden Merit. It flowers from August to October.

== Description ==
S. turbinellum is a perennial flowering plant that reaches heights of 30–100 centimeters (12–39 inches). It has straight and brittle stems, and it flowers from August to October with 14–20 light blue to purple ray florets and about the same number of yellow then later purple disk florets.

== Distribution and habitat ==
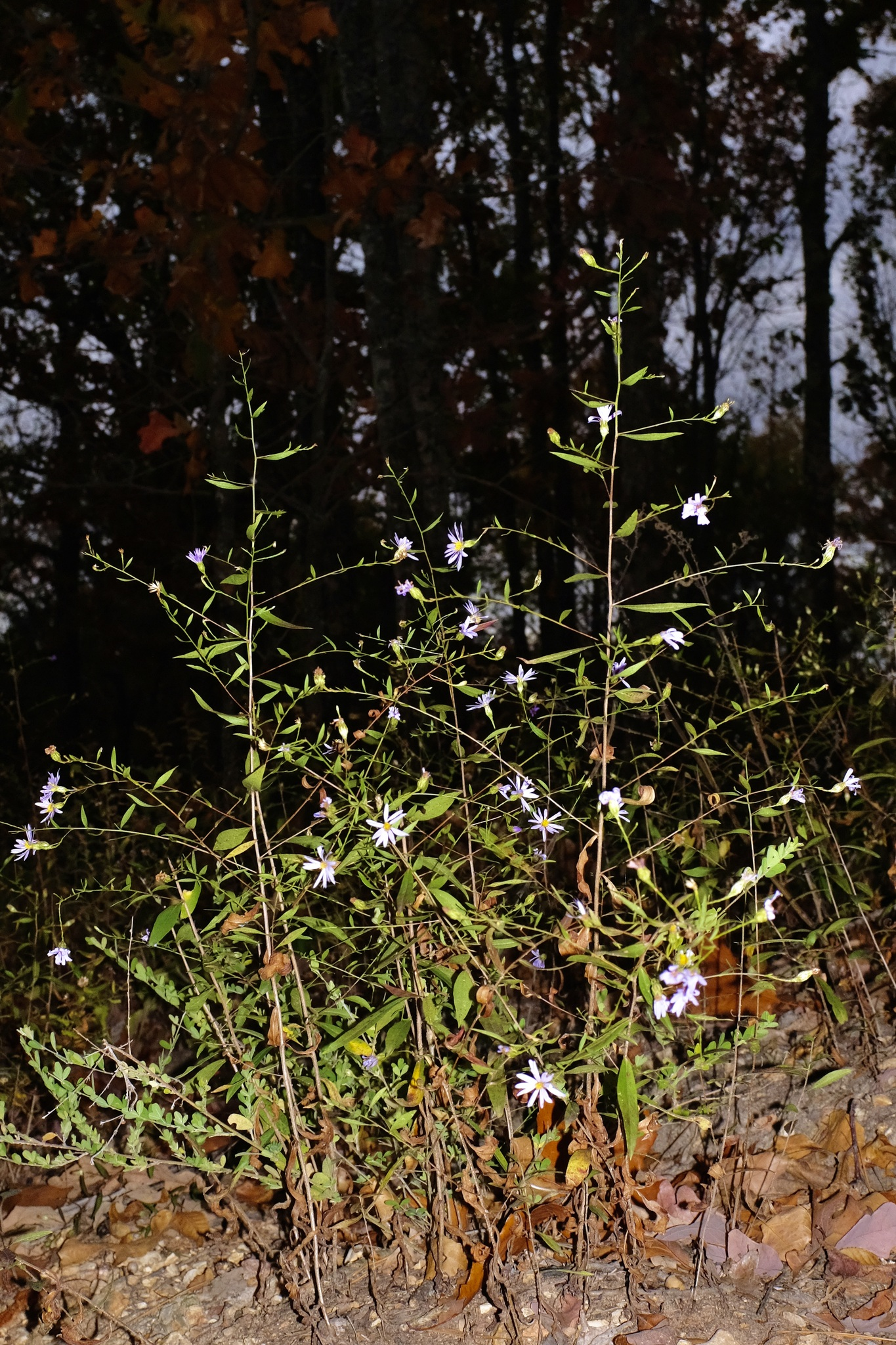
Symphyotrichum turbinellum in Missouri

S. turbinellum is native to the United States in Arkansas, Illinois, Iowa, Kansas, Louisiana, Missouri, Nebraska, and Oklahoma, primarily in the Ozarks. It can be found growing in dry and acidic soils at elevations between 60 and 900 meters (200 and 2,950 feet).

== Conservation ==
NatureServe has given it a global conservation status of Apparently Secure (G4). This was last reviewed 2 May 1988. In Iowa, it is Presumed Extirpated (SX), and in Kansas, it is Critically Imperiled (S1).

== Gardening ==
Symphyotrichum turbinellum has gained the Royal Horticultural Society's Award of Garden Merit.

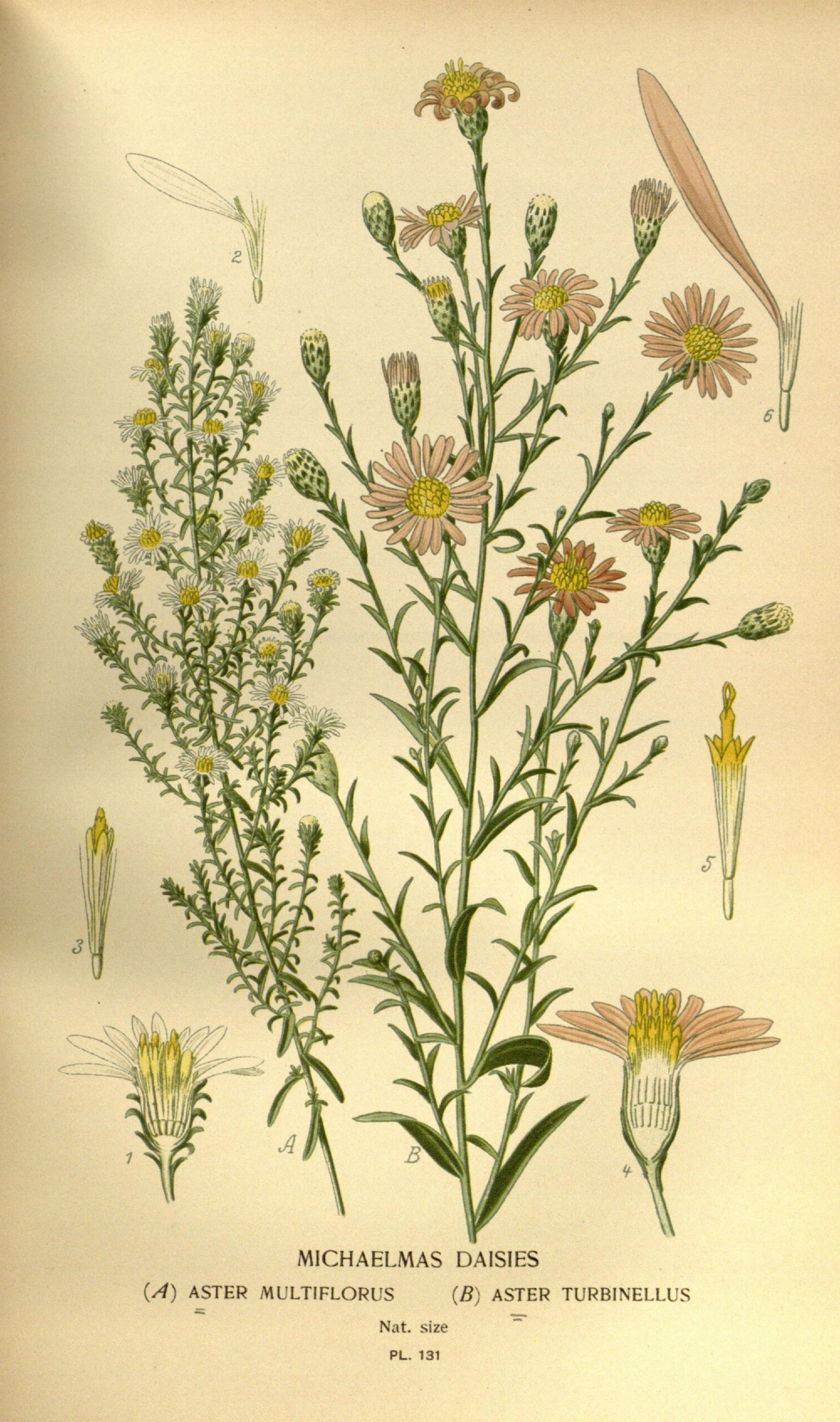
Botanical illustration (on right)

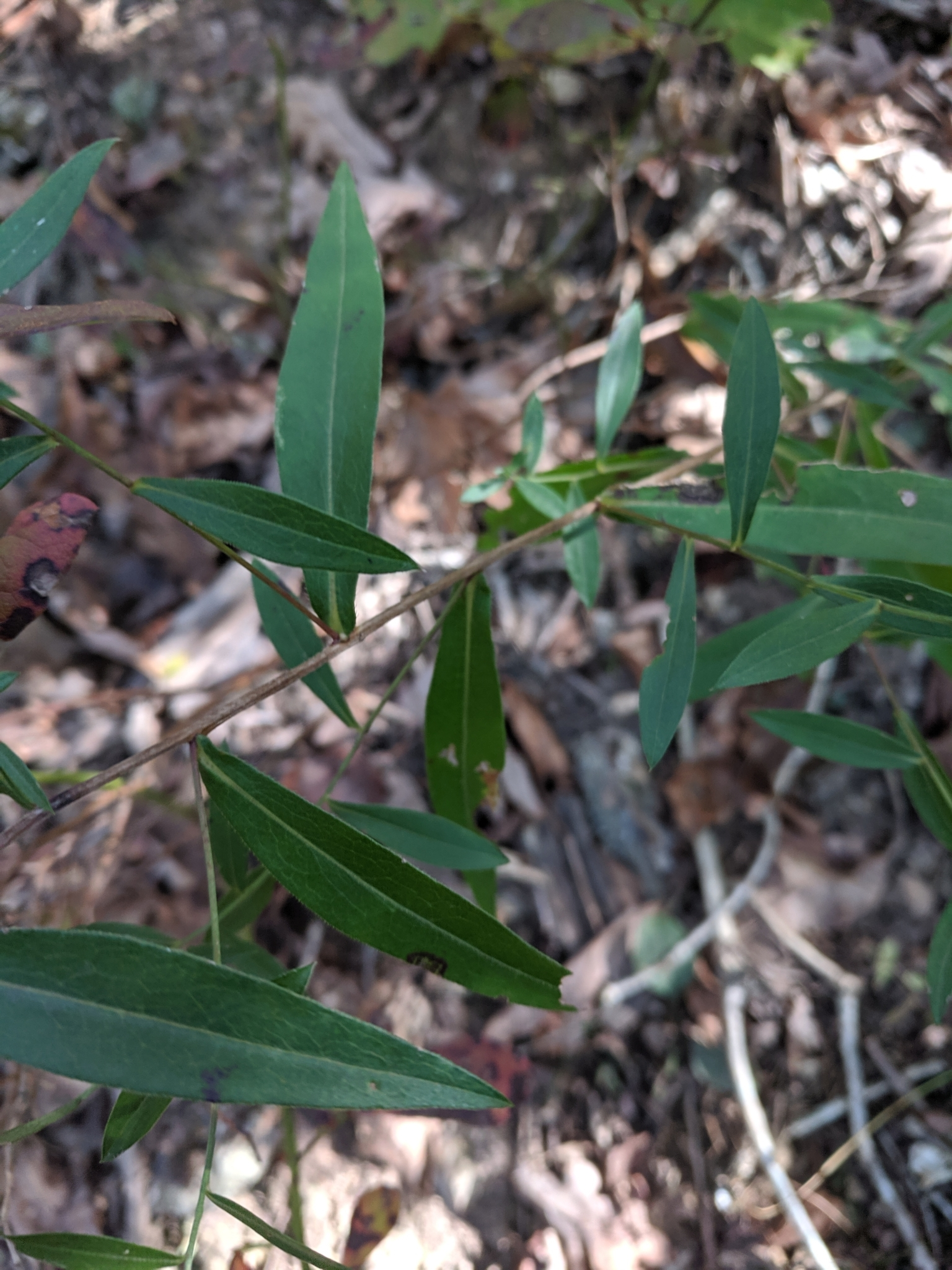
Stem and leaves

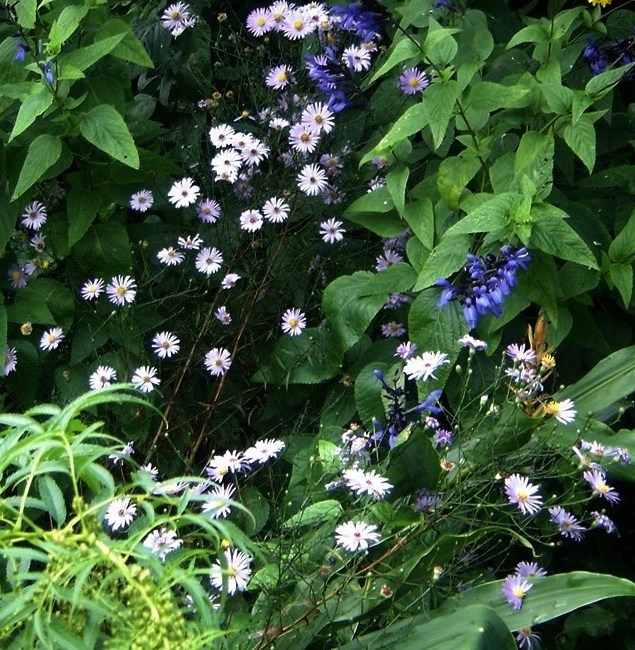
Hybrid with other flowers in a garden
