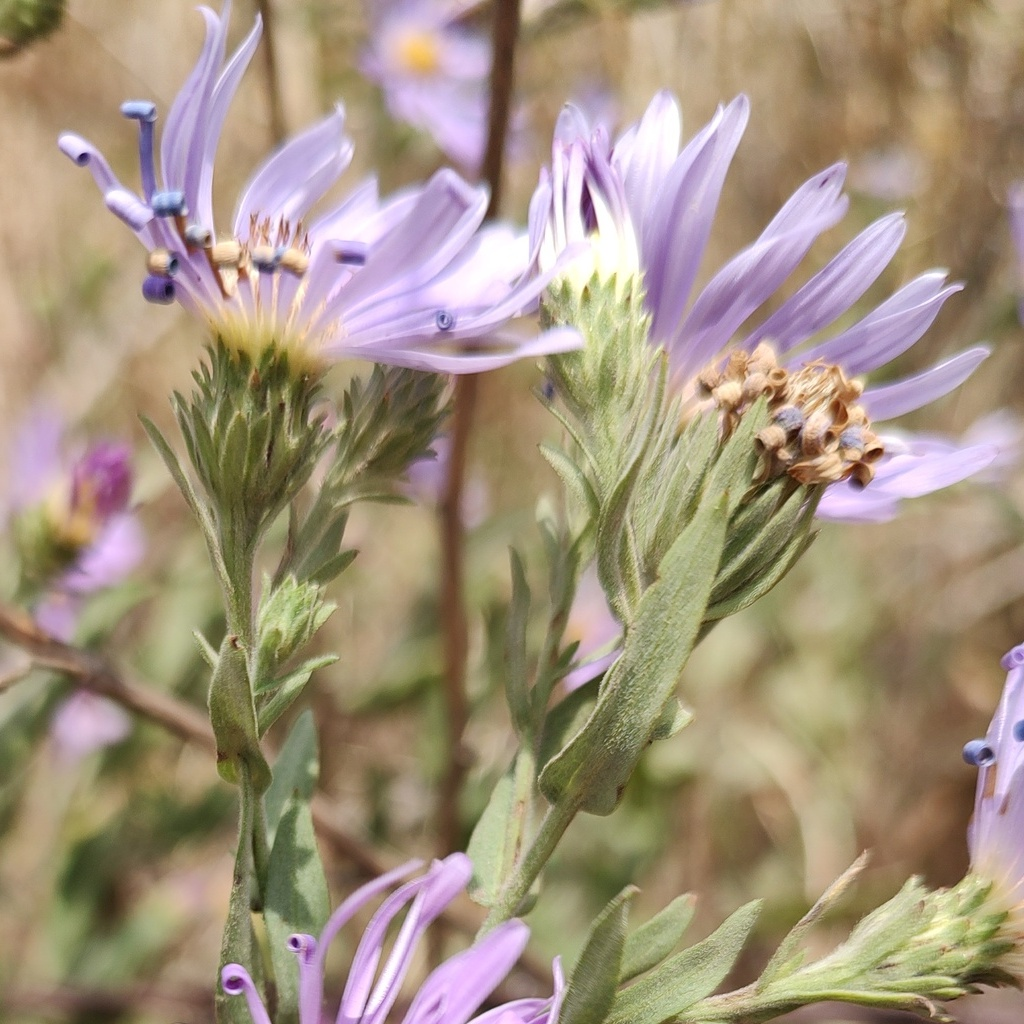

Conservation status
- Imperiled (NatureServe)

Scientific classification
- Kingdom: Plantae
- Clade: Tracheophytes
- Clade: Angiosperms
- Clade: Eudicots
- Clade: Asterids
- Order: Asterales
- Family: Asteraceae
- Tribe: Astereae
- Subtribe: Symphyotrichinae
- Genus: Symphyotrichum
- Subgenus: Symphyotrichum subg. Symphyotrichum
- Section: Symphyotrichum sect. Occidentales
- Species: S. jessicae

Binomial name
- Symphyotrichum jessicae (Piper) G.L.Nesom
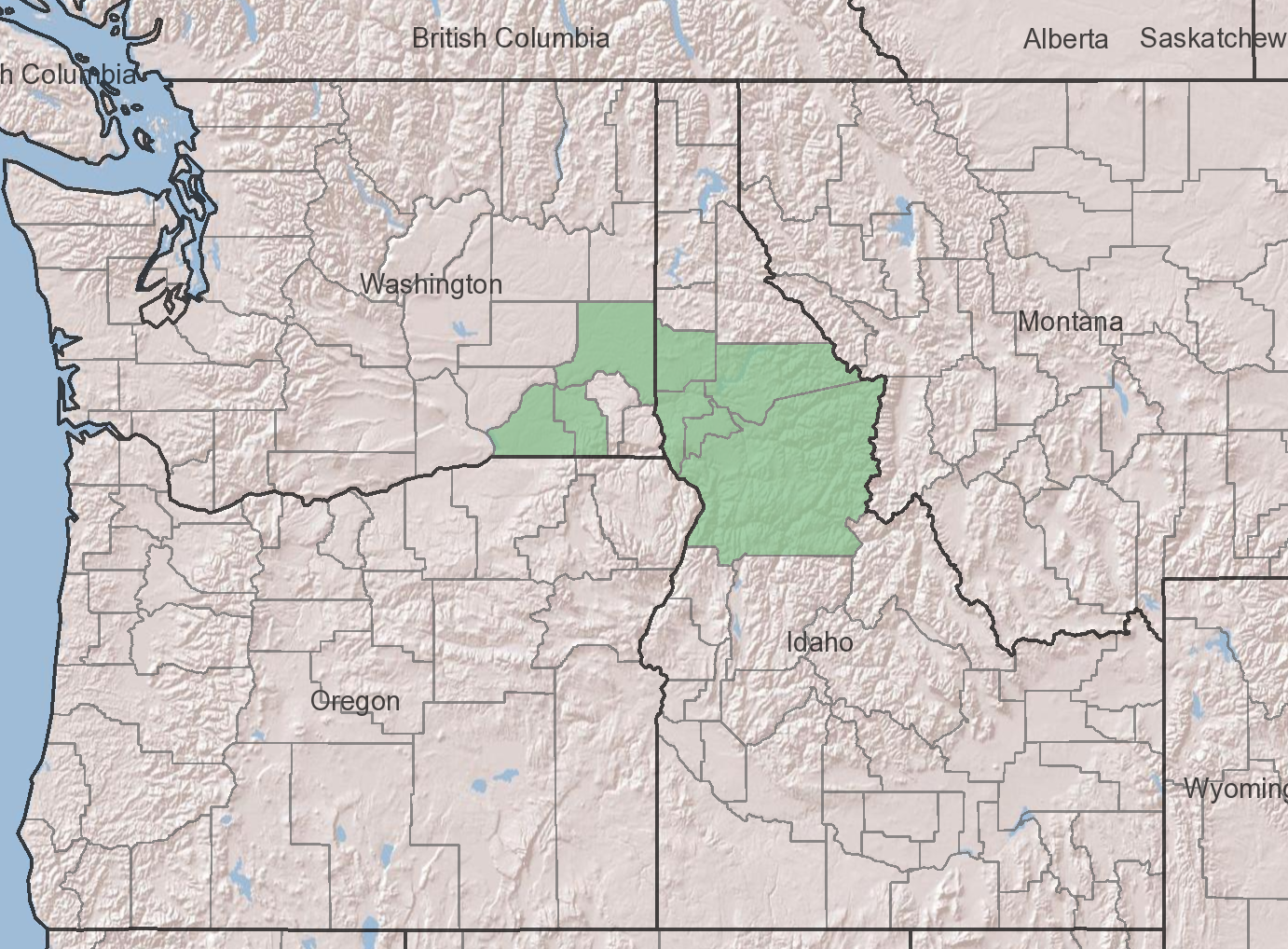
- Native distribution (Note: Idaho counties – Clearwater, Idaho, Latah, Lewis, and Nez Perce; Washington counties – Columbia, Walla Walla, and Whitman.)

Synonyms
- Aster jessicae Piper

= Symphyotrichum jessicae =

Species of flowering plant

Symphyotrichum jessicae (formerly Aster jessicae) is a species of flowering plant in the family Asteraceae endemic to Idaho and Washington states in the United States. Commonly known as Jessica's aster, it is a perennial, herbaceous plant that may reach 40 to 150 centimeters (1 1/4 to 5 feet) tall. Its flowers have violet ray florets and yellow disk florets. It is of conservation concern and known only from the Palouse River and Clearwater River drainages of eastern Washington and northwestern Idaho.

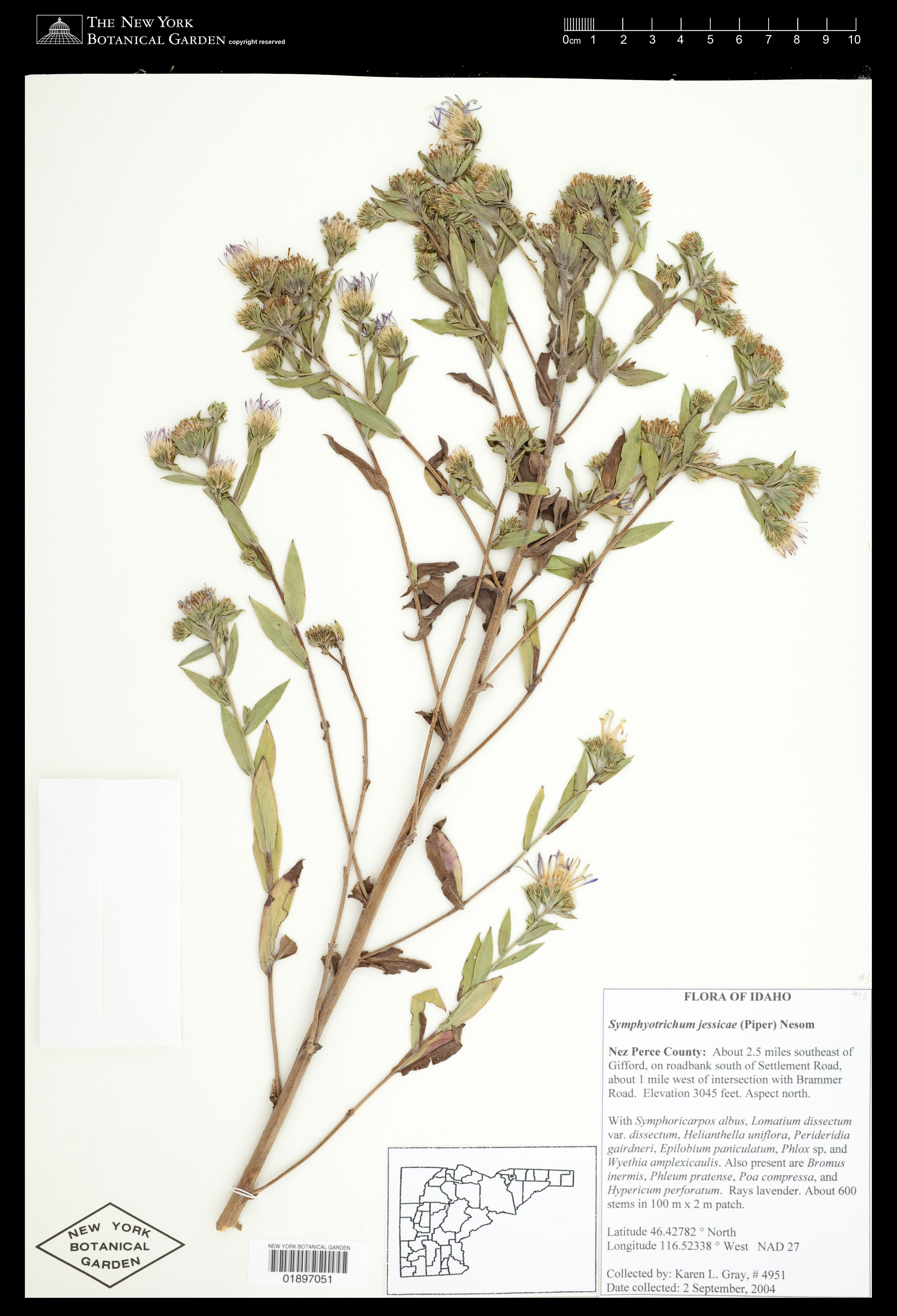
S. jessicae specimen collected at Nez Perce County, Idaho, 2 September 2004 by Karen L. Gray. Stored at the New York Botanical Garden Steere Herbarium.
