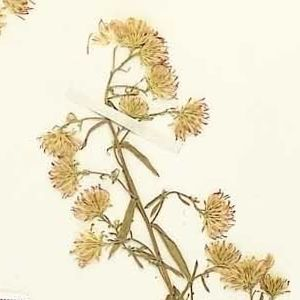

Scientific classification
- Kingdom: Plantae
- Clade: Tracheophytes
- Clade: Angiosperms
- Clade: Eudicots
- Clade: Asterids
- Order: Asterales
- Family: Asteraceae
- Tribe: Astereae
- Subtribe: Symphyotrichinae
- Genus: Symphyotrichum
- Subgenus: Symphyotrichum subg. Symphyotrichum
- Section: Symphyotrichum sect. Symphyotrichum
- Species: S. leone

Binomial name
- Symphyotrichum leone (Britton) G.L.Nesom
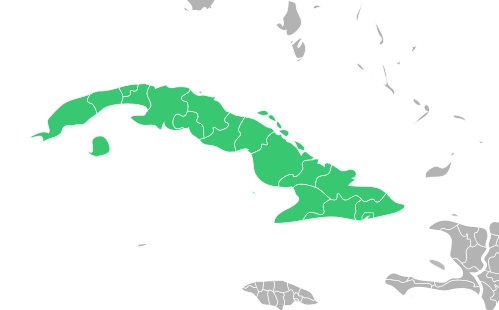
- Native distribution

Synonyms
- Aster leonis Britton

= Symphyotrichum leone =

Species of plant in the aster family

Symphyotrichum leone (formerly Aster leonis) is a species of flowering plant in the family Asteraceae native to Cuba. It is also spelled Symphyotrichum leonis.

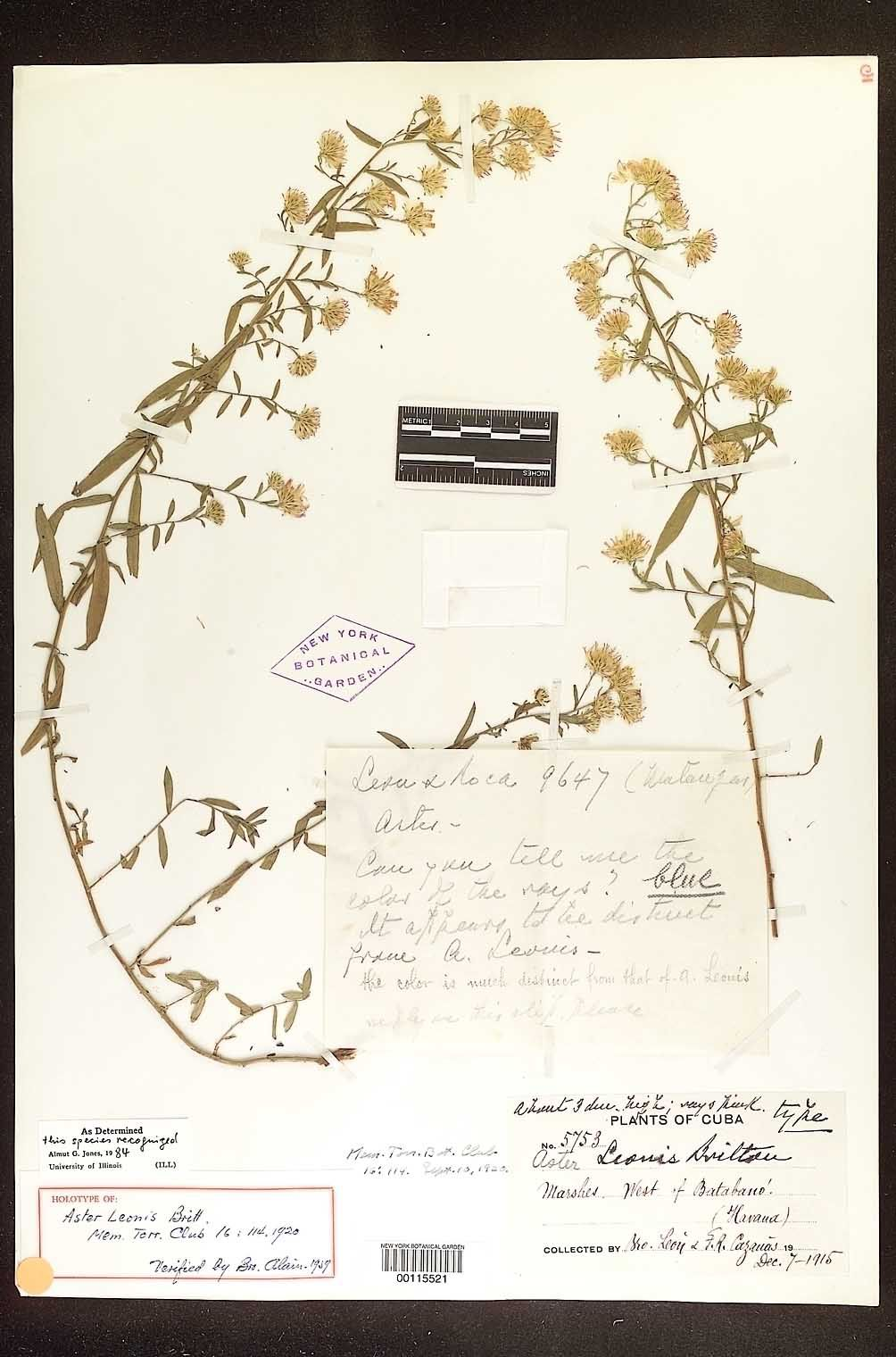
Holotype of Aster leonis
