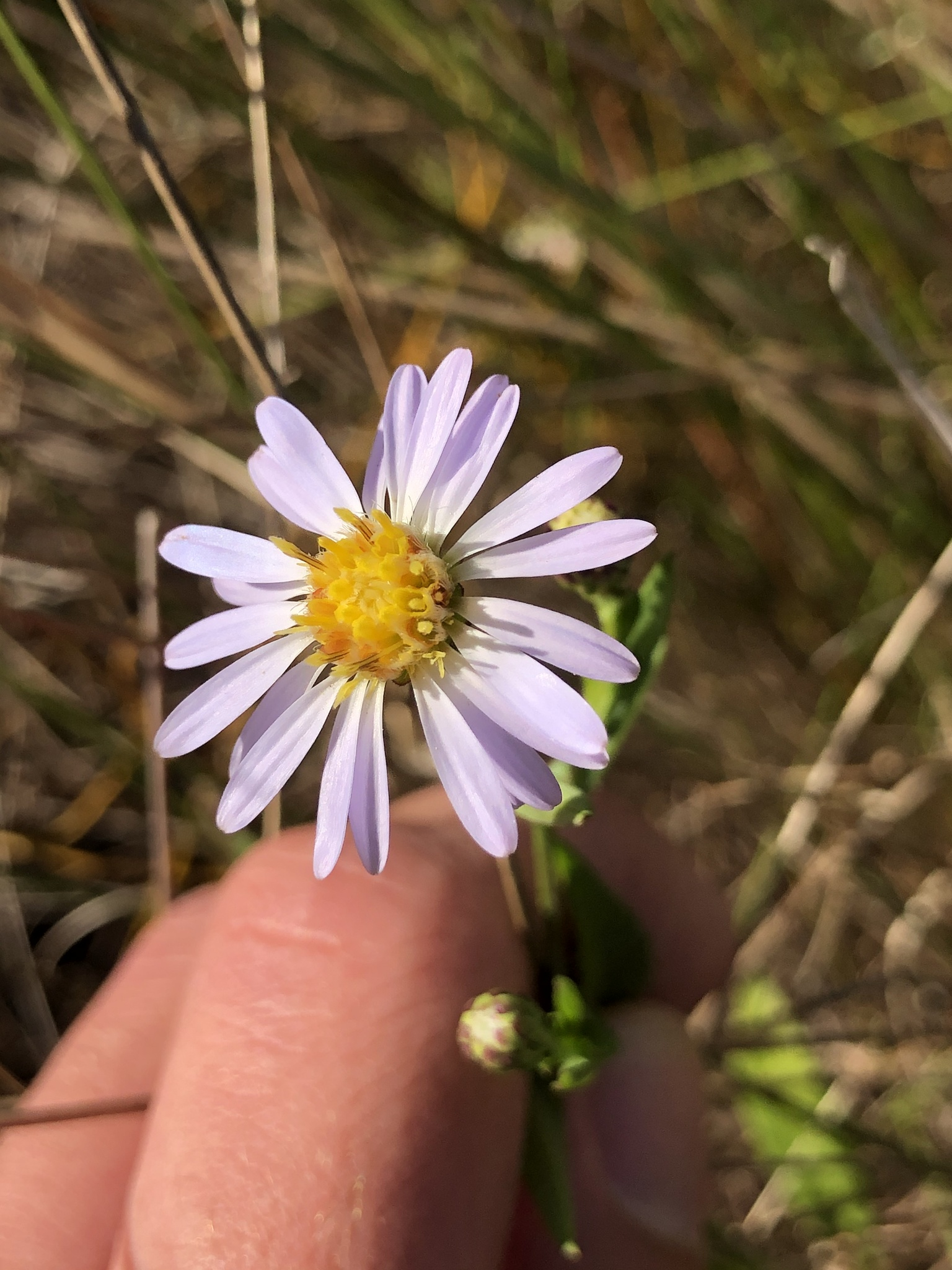

Conservation status
- Apparently Secure (NatureServe)

Scientific classification
- Kingdom: Plantae
- Clade: Tracheophytes
- Clade: Angiosperms
- Clade: Eudicots
- Clade: Asterids
- Order: Asterales
- Family: Asteraceae
- Tribe: Astereae
- Subtribe: Symphyotrichinae
- Genus: Symphyotrichum
- Subgenus: Symphyotrichum subg. Symphyotrichum
- Section: Symphyotrichum sect. Symphyotrichum
- Species: S. simmondsii

Binomial name
- Symphyotrichum simmondsii (Small) G.L.Nesom
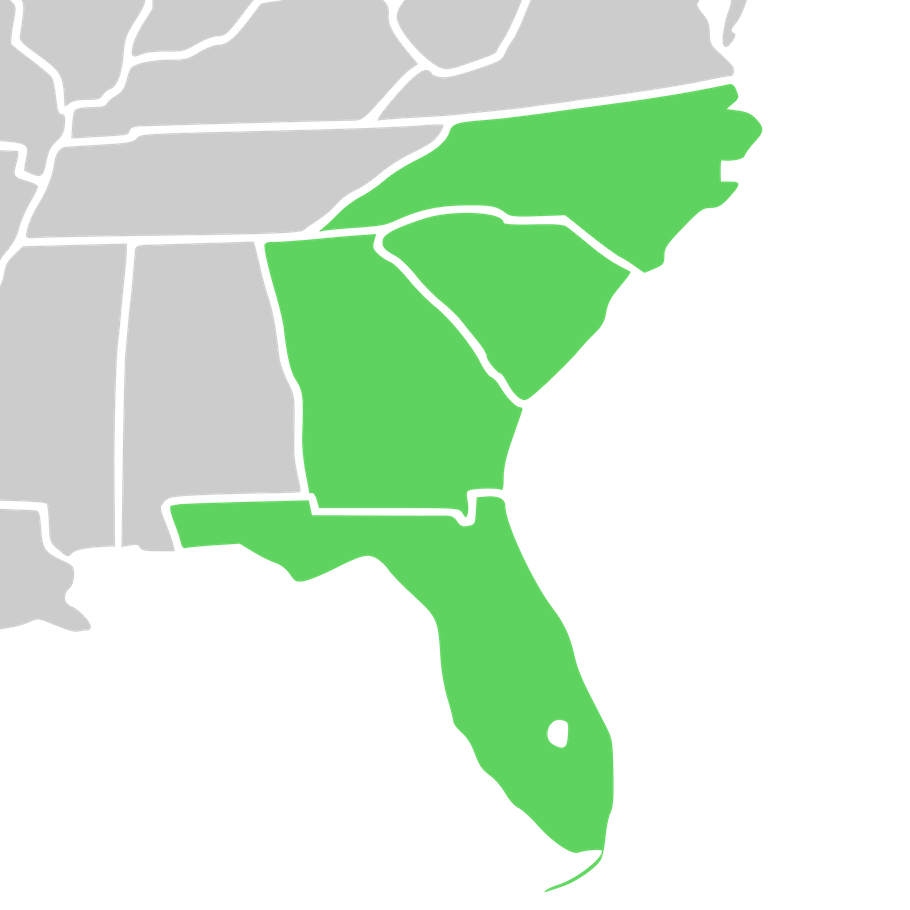
- Native distribution

Synonyms
- Aster simmondsii Small; Aster sulznerae Small

= Symphyotrichum simmondsii =

Species of plant in the aster family

Symphyotrichum simmondsii (formerly Aster simmondsii) is a species of flowering plant of the family Asteraceae endemic to the southeastern United States. Commonly known as Simmonds' aster, it is a colony-forming herbaceous perennial.

== Description ==
Symphyotrichum simmondsii is a colony-forming herbaceous perennial that grows 10 centimeters (4 inches) to 120 cm (4 ft) tall from long rhizomes. The flowers have an average of 18–38 pale lavender or lilac to pale purple petals, also called rays or ray florets. The flower centers, composed of disk florets, begin as yellow and become reddish as they mature. There are roughly 24–37 disk florets, each with five lobes.

S. simmondsii has a base number of x = 8 and an octaploid chromosome count of 64.

== Distribution and habitat ==
The species grows in moist or dry habitats at elevations of up to 50 meters (164 feet) and can be found in the southeastern United States, particularly in peninsular Florida.

== Gallery ==
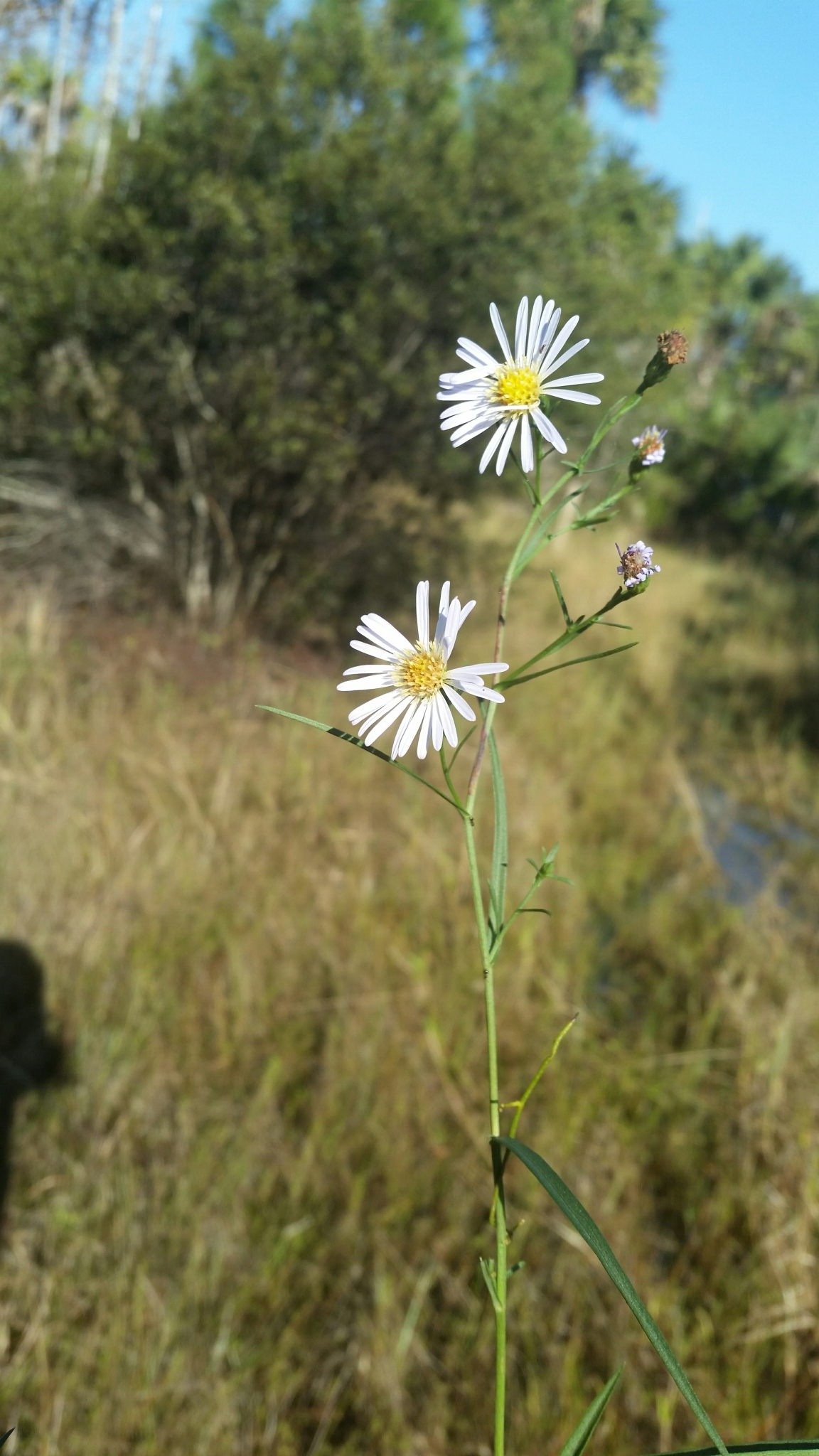

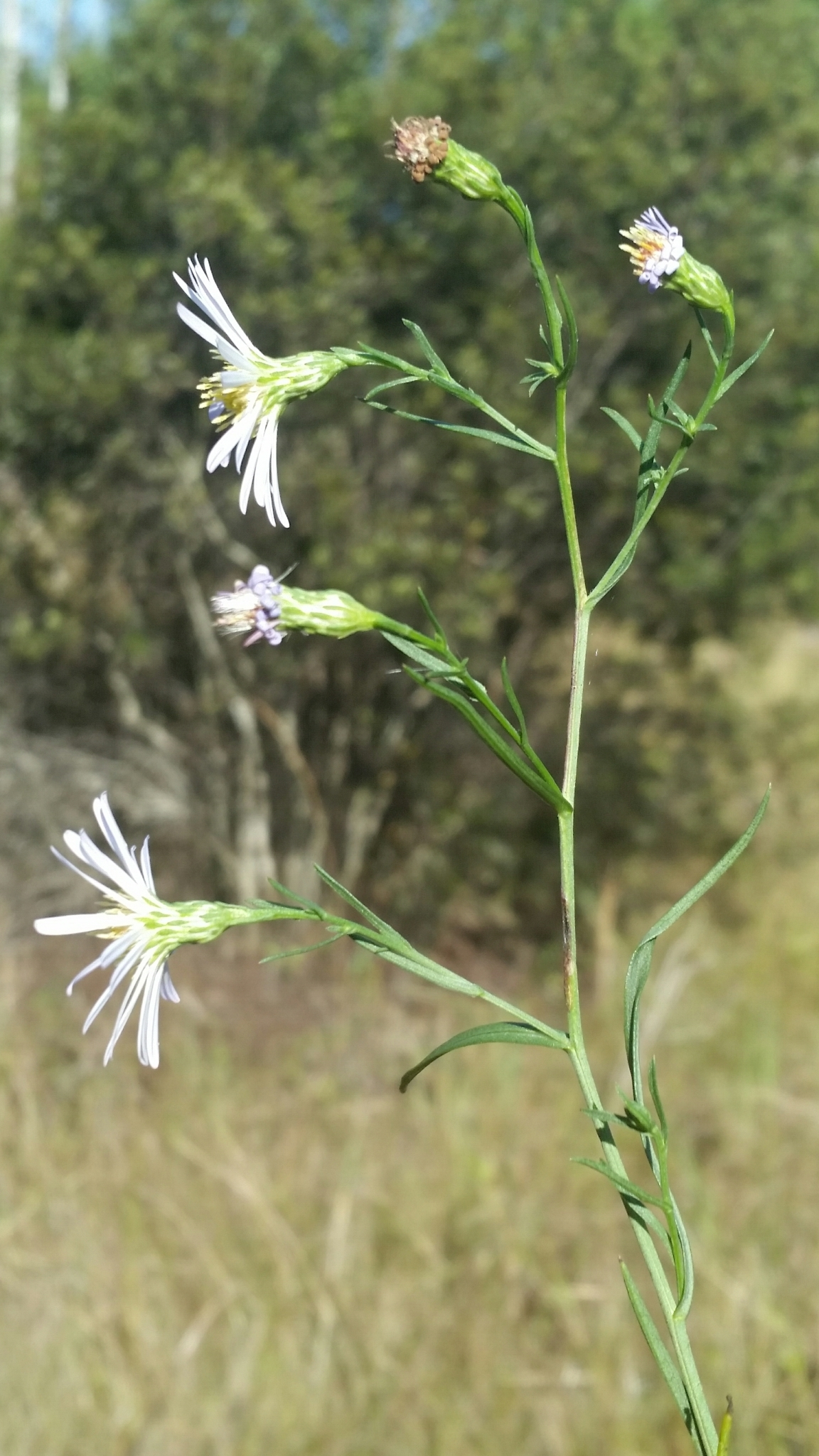

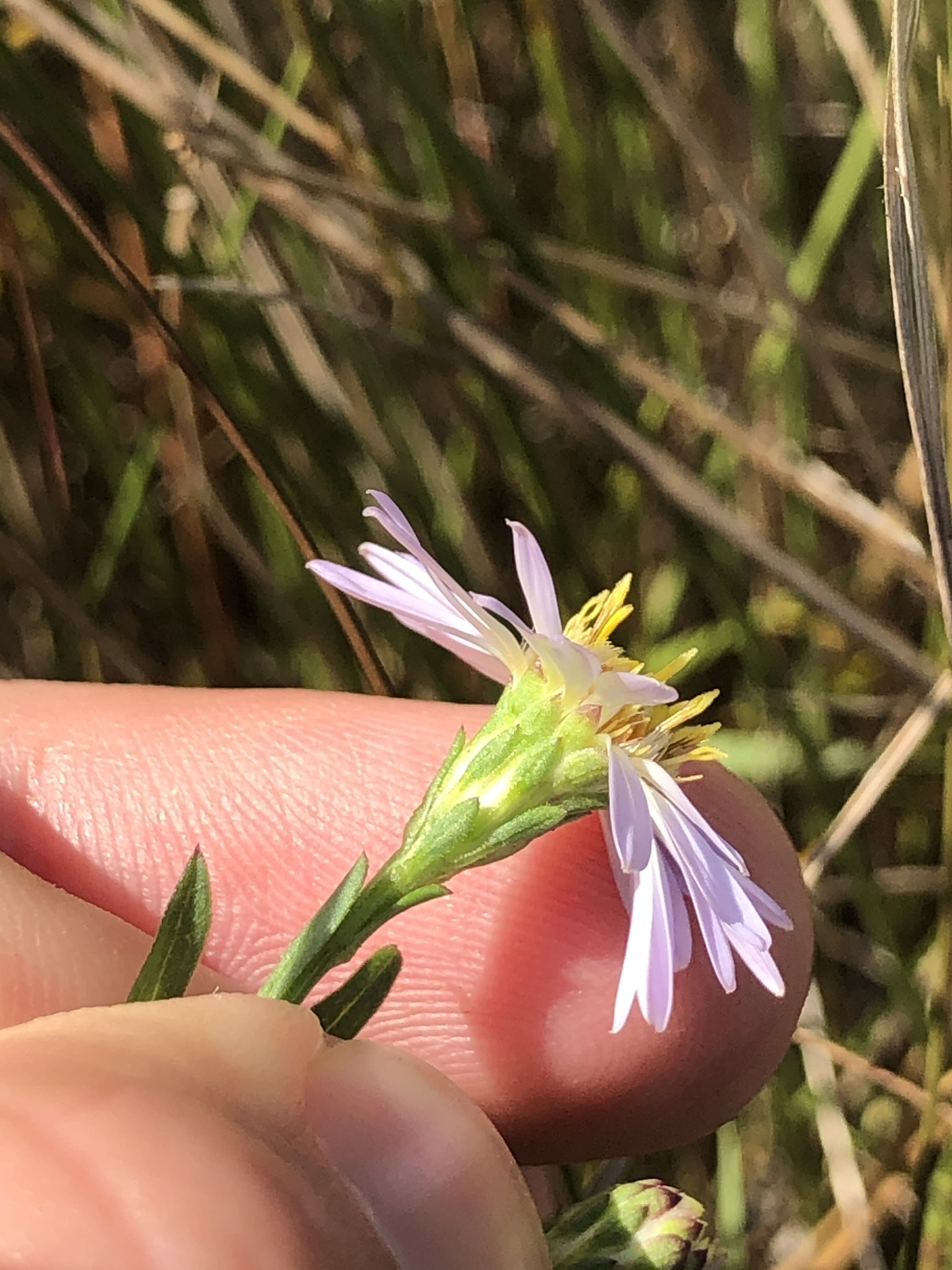

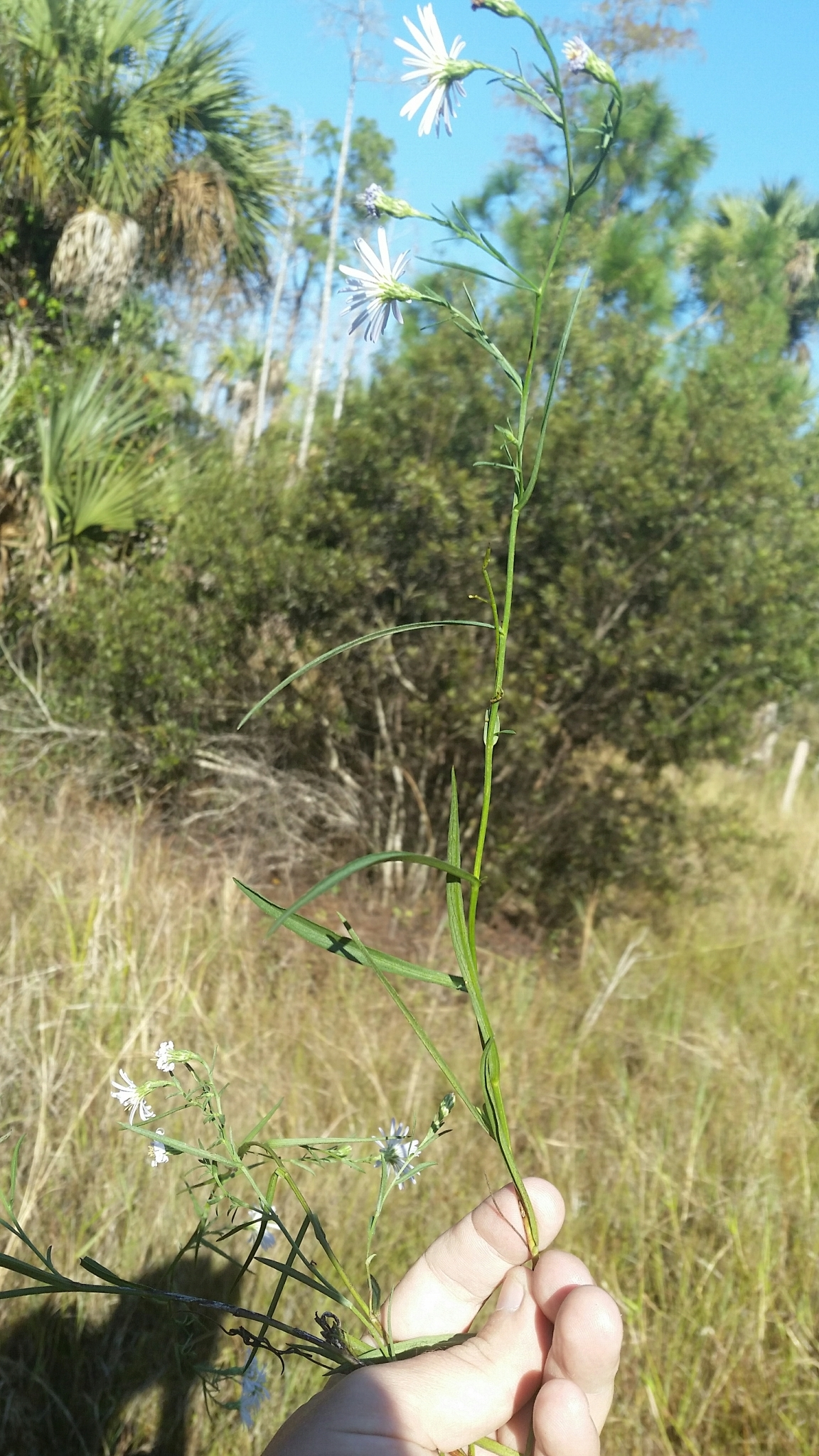
