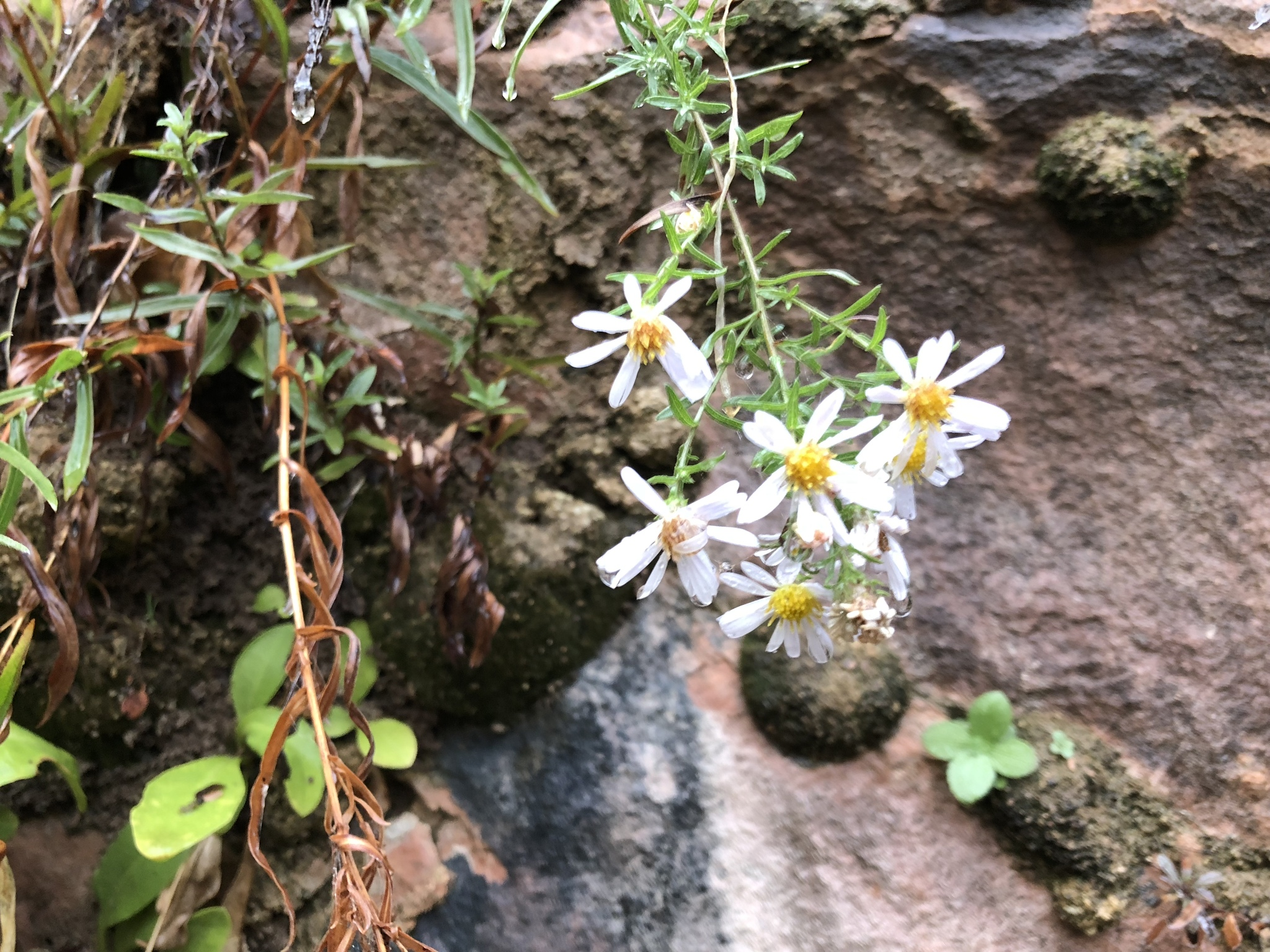

Conservation status
- Imperiled (NatureServe)

Scientific classification
- Kingdom: Plantae
- Clade: Tracheophytes
- Clade: Angiosperms
- Clade: Eudicots
- Clade: Asterids
- Order: Asterales
- Family: Asteraceae
- Tribe: Astereae
- Subtribe: Symphyotrichinae
- Genus: Symphyotrichum
- Subgenus: Symphyotrichum subg. Symphyotrichum
- Section: Symphyotrichum sect. Symphyotrichum
- Species: S. welshii

Binomial name
- Symphyotrichum welshii (Cronquist) G.L.Nesom
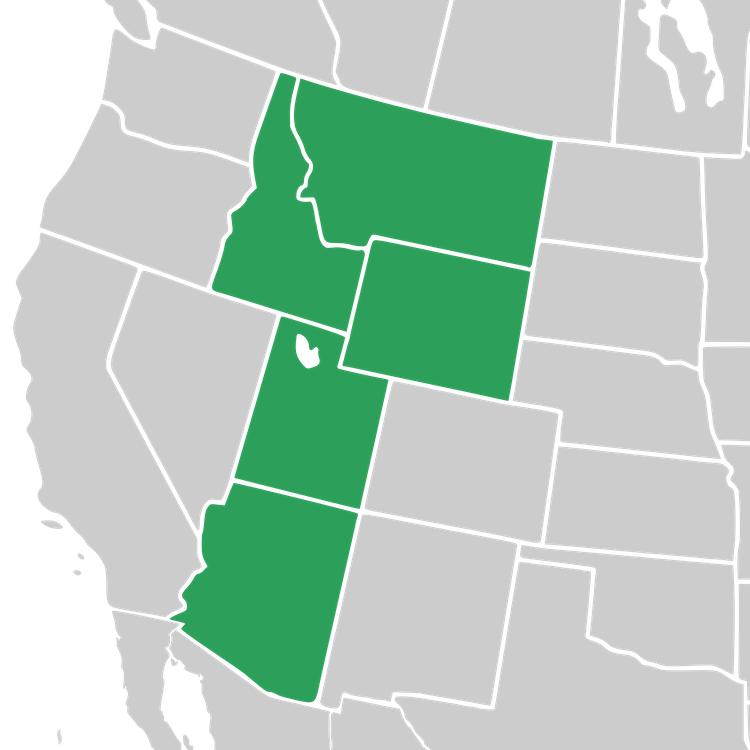
- Native distribution

Synonyms
- Aster welshii Cronquist

= Symphyotrichum welshii =

Species of plant in the aster family

Symphyotrichum welshii (formerly Aster welshii) is an imperiled species of flowering plant of the aster family (Asteraceae) endemic to only certain western states in the United States, specifically Arizona, Idaho, Montana, Utah, and Wyoming, and is found at elevations of 1,300–2,300 meters (4,300–7,500 feet). It is perennial and herbaceous and may reach a height of 1 meter (3 feet 3 inches). Its bloom time is August–October, and it grows in wet soils that occur in dry areas.

Symphyotrichum welshii is classified in the subgenus Symphyotrichum, section Symphyotrichum, subsection Dumosi. It is one of the "bushy asters and relatives."
