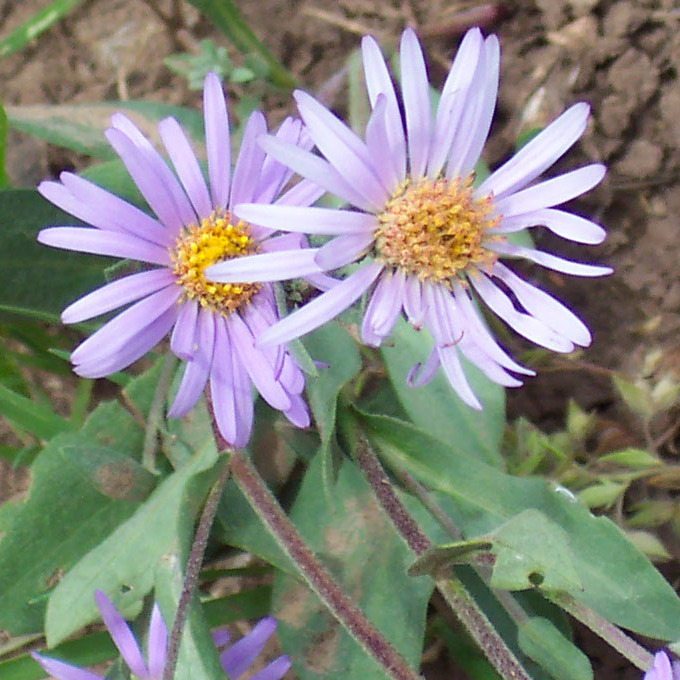

Conservation status
- Vulnerable (NatureServe)

Scientific classification
- Kingdom: Plantae
- Clade: Tracheophytes
- Clade: Angiosperms
- Clade: Eudicots
- Clade: Asterids
- Order: Asterales
- Family: Asteraceae
- Genus: Symphyotrichum
- Subgenus: Symphyotrichum subg. Symphyotrichum
- Section: Symphyotrichum sect. Occidentales
- Species: S. molle

Binomial name
- Symphyotrichum molle (Rydb.) G.L.Nesom
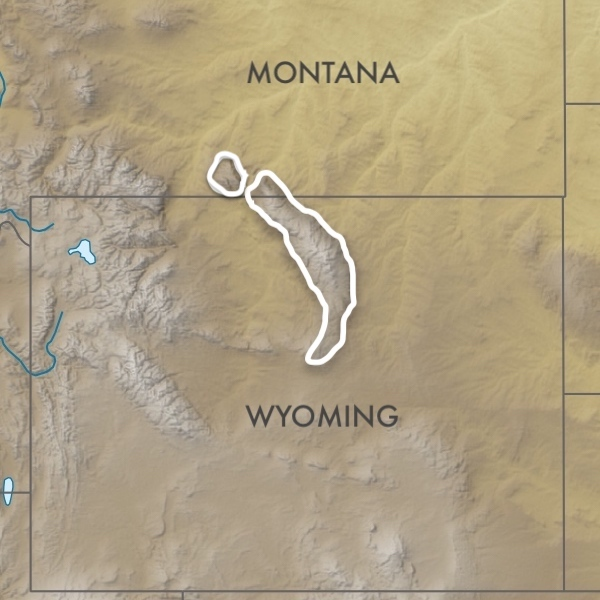
- S. molle range is outlined in white. It is endemic to the Bighorn Mountains of Montana and Wyoming.

Synonyms
- Aster mollis Rydb.

= Symphyotrichum molle =

Species of plant in the aster family

Symphyotrichum molle (formerly Aster mollis) is a species of flowering plant in the aster family (Asteraceae) endemic to the Bighorn Mountains of Montana and Wyoming in the United States. Commonly known as soft aster, it is a perennial, herbaceous plant that ranges from 30 to 60 centimeters (12 to 24 inches) in height.

== Description ==
Symphyotrichum molle is a perennial, herbaceous plant which blooms in August. It grows from 30 to 60 centimeters (12 to 24 inches) in height, and it is colonial with long rhizomes in its root system. It has from one to five stems, sometimes more, that are densely covered in soft, downy hairs, sometimes to the extent of being woolly. The stems arise from the root base in an ascending or erect fashion.

=== Leaves ===
The leaves are thin and covered in downy to woolly hairs on both sides. They are smooth around the edges and pointed at the ends. Those at the base are oblanceolate in shape, have short leafstalks (petioles), and are from 1.5 to 5 cm (0.6 to 2.0 in) in length and usually 0.5 to 2 cm (0.2 to 0.8 in) in width. By the time the plant blooms, the basal leaves usually have withered or dried. The stem leaves (cauline leaves) are longer and wider than the basal leaves, with lengths ranging from 5 to 15 cm (2.0 to 5.9 in) and widths from 1 to 2.5 cm (0.4 to 1.0 in). They may or may not have a petiole, and they are oblanceolate in shape. They slightly clasp the stem. Leaves furthest on the stem (distal leaves), closest to the flowers, are lanceolate rather than oblanceolate, 3–10 cm (1.2–3.9 in) in length, and 1–2 cm (0.4–0.8 in) wide.

=== Flowers ===
The inflorescences of Symphyotrichum molle have flower heads in corymbiform to paniculiform arrays with their branches growing up to 20 cm (7.9 in) in length. Each head has a hairy peduncle with 0–3 bracts which are either lanceolate to narrowly ovate in shape. The involucres are bell-shaped and 7–9 millimeters in length with oblong to oblanceolate phyllaries that are in 4–5, sometimes up to 6, unequal series.

Its flowers have 20–35 violet ray florets that are from 12 to 20 mm in length and 1–2 mm wide. There are usually 35–70 yellow disk florets with triangular lobes when they bloom.

=== Chromosomes ===
Symphyotrichum molle has a base number of eight chromosomes (x = 8) with a tetraploid count of 32.

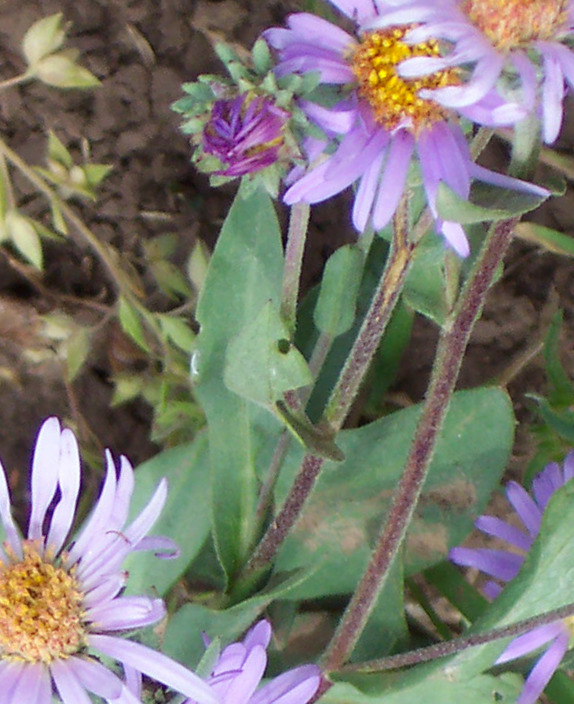
S. molle stems and leaves

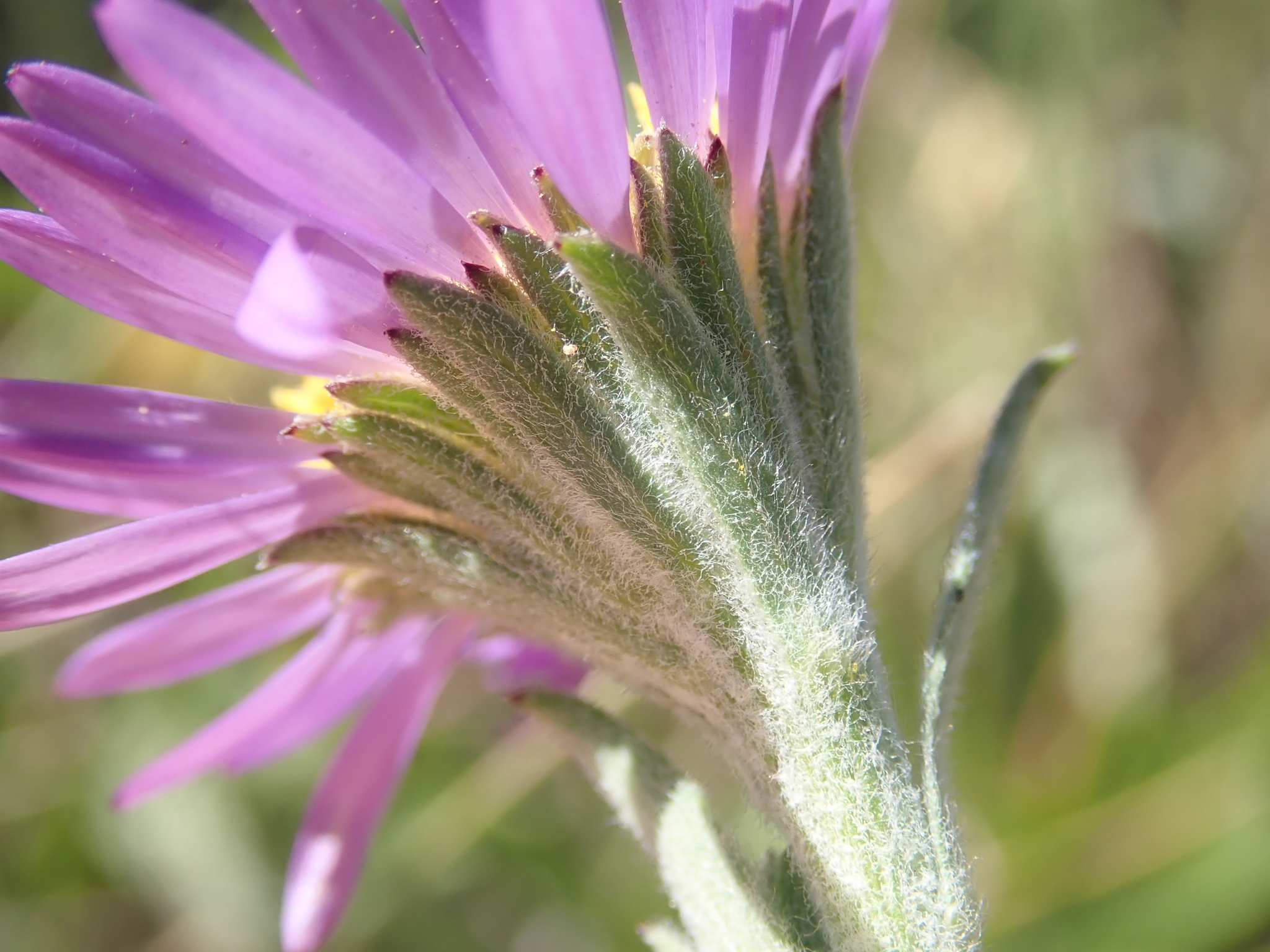
S. molle bracts, involucre, and phyllaries

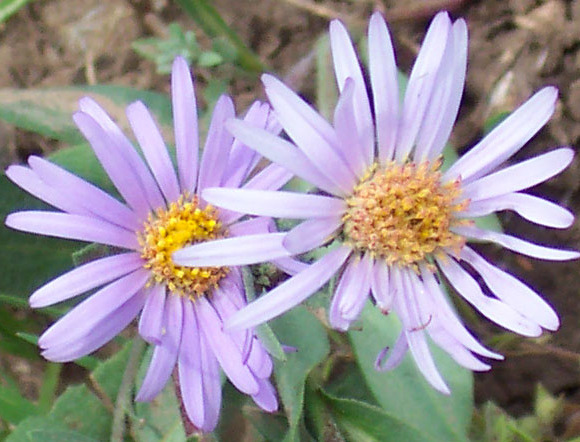
S. molle flower heads

== Distribution and habitat ==
Symphyotrichum molle is endemic to the Bighorn Mountains of Montana and Wyoming in the United States. It is a montane species that can be found at elevations ranging from 2,000 to 3,000 meters (6,600 to 9,800 feet) in dry meadows.

== Conservation ==
NatureServe lists Symphyotrichum molle as Vulnerable (G3) worldwide, Imperiled (S2) in Montana, and Vulnerable (S3) in Wyoming. Its global status was last reviewed by NatureServe on 10 April 1998.
