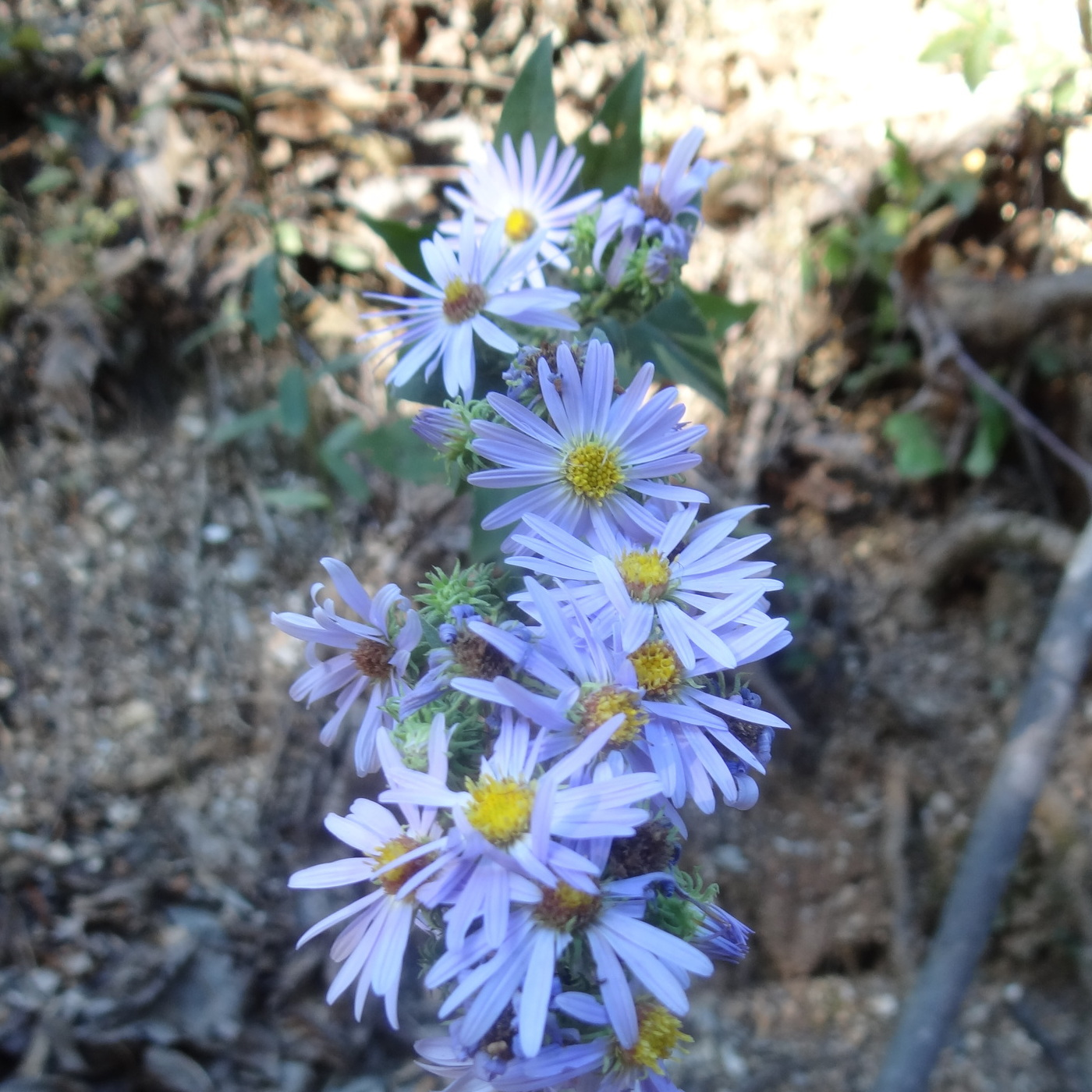

Conservation status
- Apparently Secure (NatureServe)

Scientific classification
- Kingdom: Plantae
- Clade: Tracheophytes
- Clade: Angiosperms
- Clade: Eudicots
- Clade: Asterids
- Order: Asterales
- Family: Asteraceae
- Tribe: Astereae
- Subtribe: Symphyotrichinae
- Genus: Symphyotrichum
- Subgenus: Symphyotrichum subg. Symphyotrichum
- Section: Symphyotrichum sect. Symphyotrichum
- Species: S. anomalum

Binomial name
- Symphyotrichum anomalum (Engelm.) G.L.Nesom
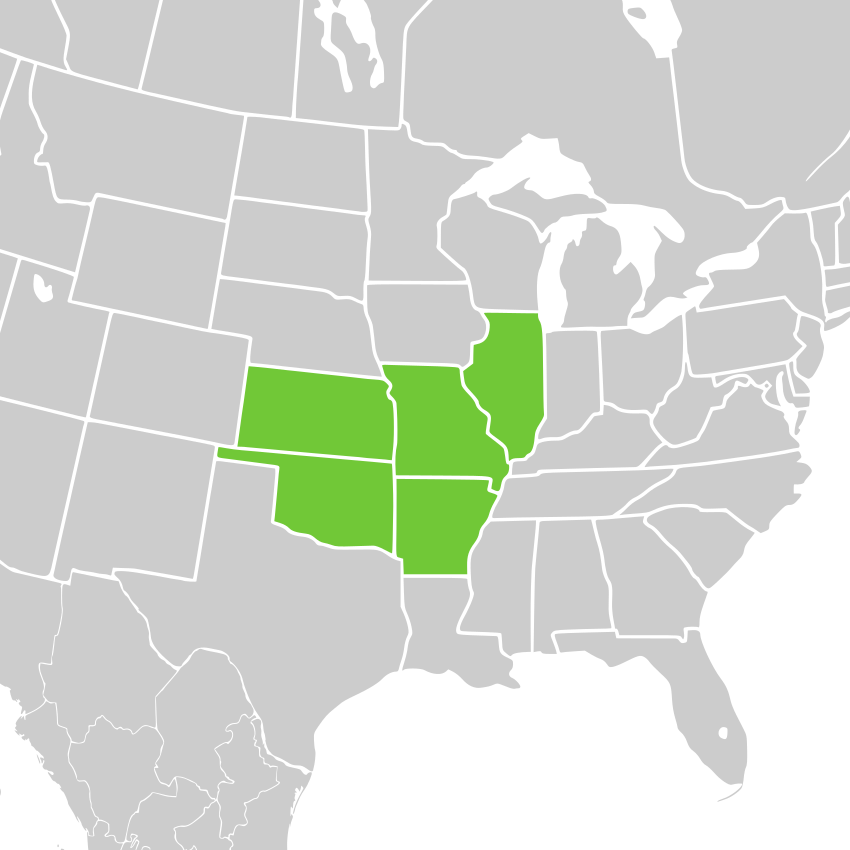
- Native distribution

Synonyms
- Aster anomalus Engelm.; Aster anomalus f. albidus Steyerm.

= Symphyotrichum anomalum =

Species of plant in the aster family

Symphyotrichum anomalum (formerly Aster anomalus) is a species of flowering plant in the family Asteraceae native to Arkansas, Illinois, Kansas, Missouri, and Oklahoma. With the common name of manyray aster, it is a perennial, herbaceous plant that may reach 20 to 120 centimeters (3/4 to 4 feet) tall. Its flowers, which are attractive to butterflies, have lavender or blue to purple, seldom white, ray florets and cream or light yellow, then pinkish-purple disk florets.

== Description ==
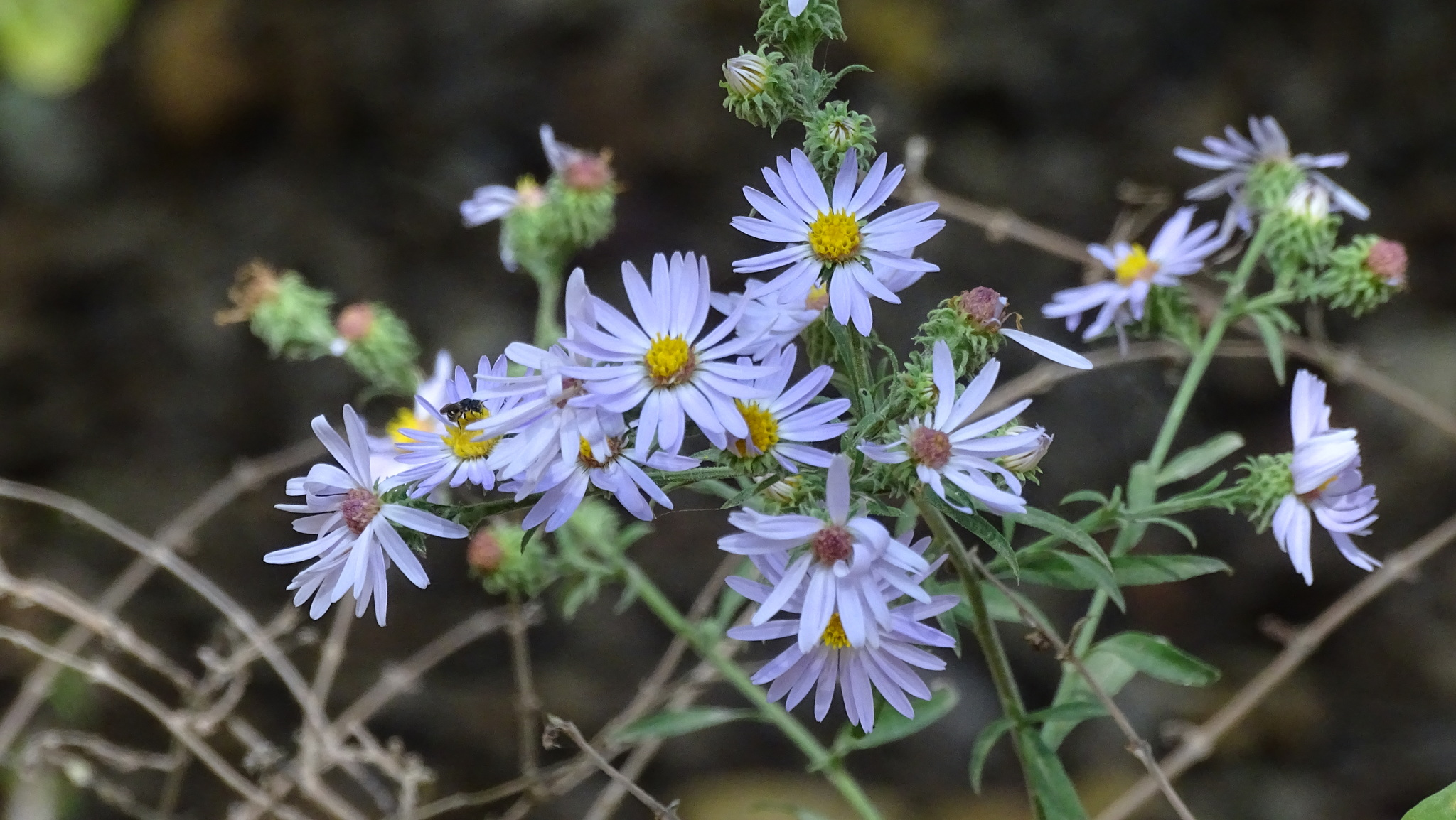
View of involucres and phyllaries

S. anomalum has lower leaves with untoothed margins that are heart-shaped at the base. It is a perennial, herbaceous plant that may reach 20 to 120 centimeters (3/4 to 4 feet) tall. Its flowers, which are attractive to butterflies, have lavender or blue to purple, seldom white, ray florets and cream or light yellow, then pinkish-purple disk florets.

== Distribution and habitat ==
Symphyotrichum anomalum is native to Arkansas, Illinois, Kansas, Missouri, and Oklahoma. It can be found in dry soils over limestone and in acid soils at elevations between 50 and 500 meters (160 and 1,640 feet).

== Conservation ==
As of October 2024, NatureServe listed S. anomalum as Apparently Secure (G4) worldwide. This status was last reviewed on 2 May 1988. It is Critically Imperiled (S1) in Kansas.
