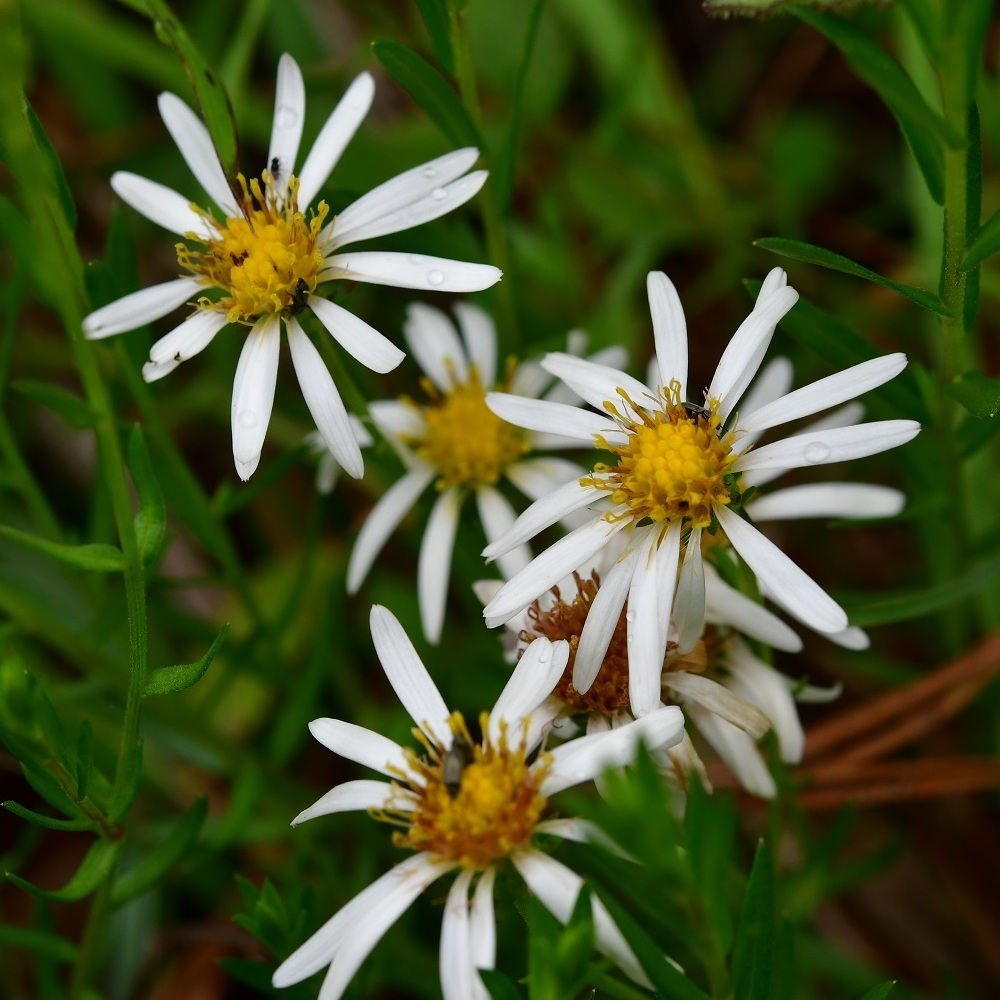

Scientific classification
- Kingdom: Plantae
- Clade: Tracheophytes
- Clade: Angiosperms
- Clade: Eudicots
- Clade: Asterids
- Order: Asterales
- Family: Asteraceae
- Tribe: Astereae
- Subtribe: Symphyotrichinae
- Genus: Symphyotrichum
- Subgenus: Symphyotrichum subg. Symphyotrichum
- Section: Symphyotrichum sect. Symphyotrichum
- Species: S. bullatum

Binomial name
- Symphyotrichum bullatum (Klatt) G.L.Nesom
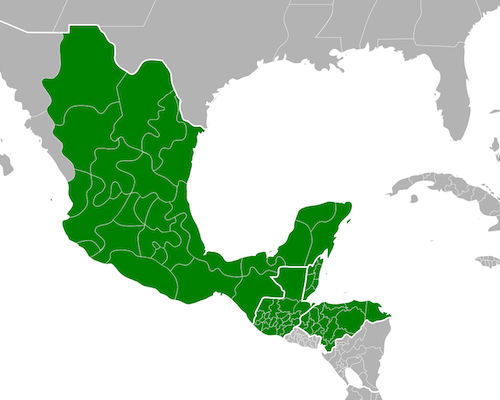
- Native distribution

Synonyms
- Aster bullatus Klatt; Aster jalapensis Fernald

= Symphyotrichum bullatum =

Species of flowering plant in the daisy family

Symphyotrichum bullatum (formerly Aster bullatus) is a species of flowering plant in the family Asteraceae native to Mexico and Central America.

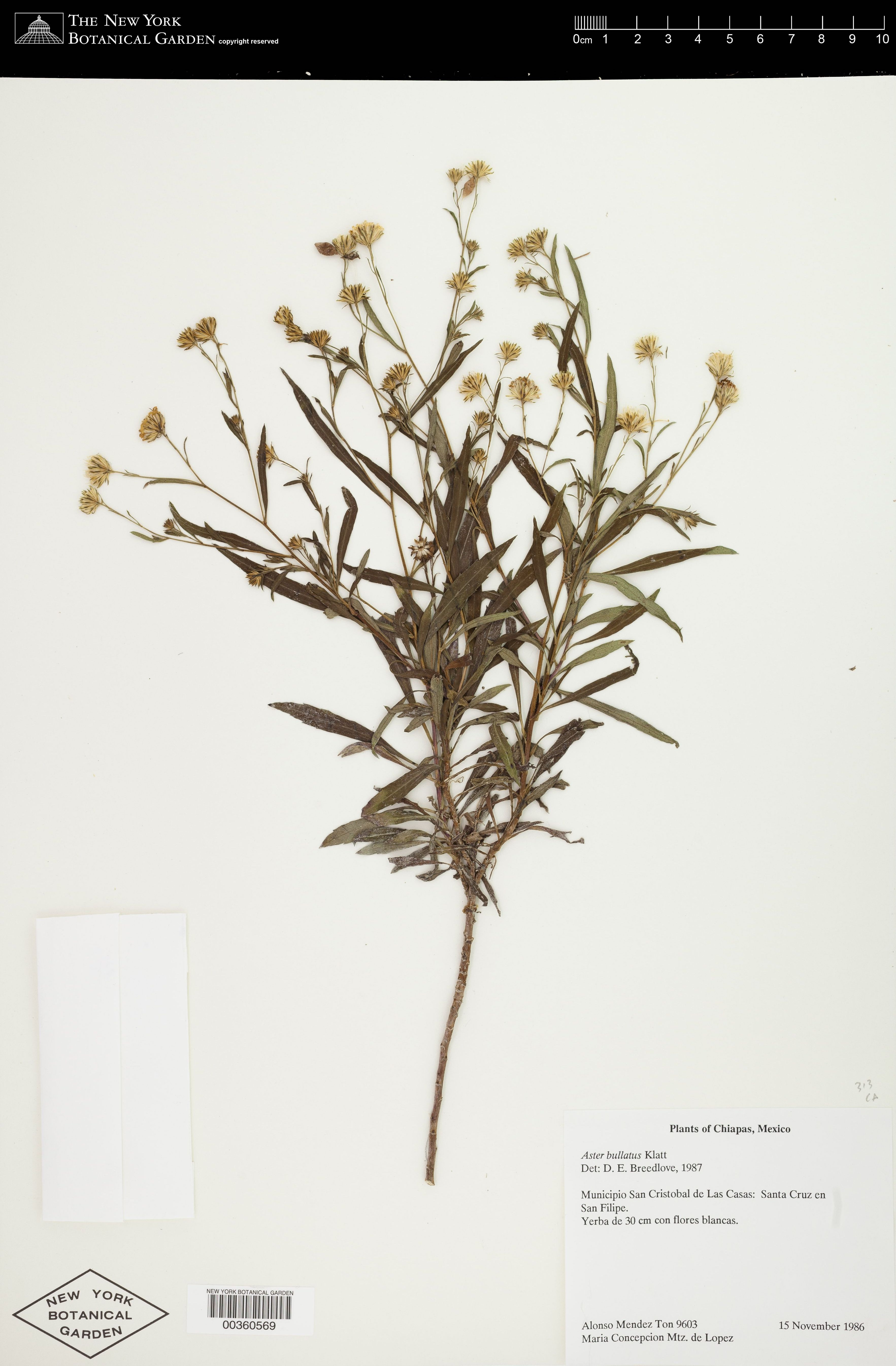
Aster bullatus (Symphyotrichum bullatum) specimen NY 360569
