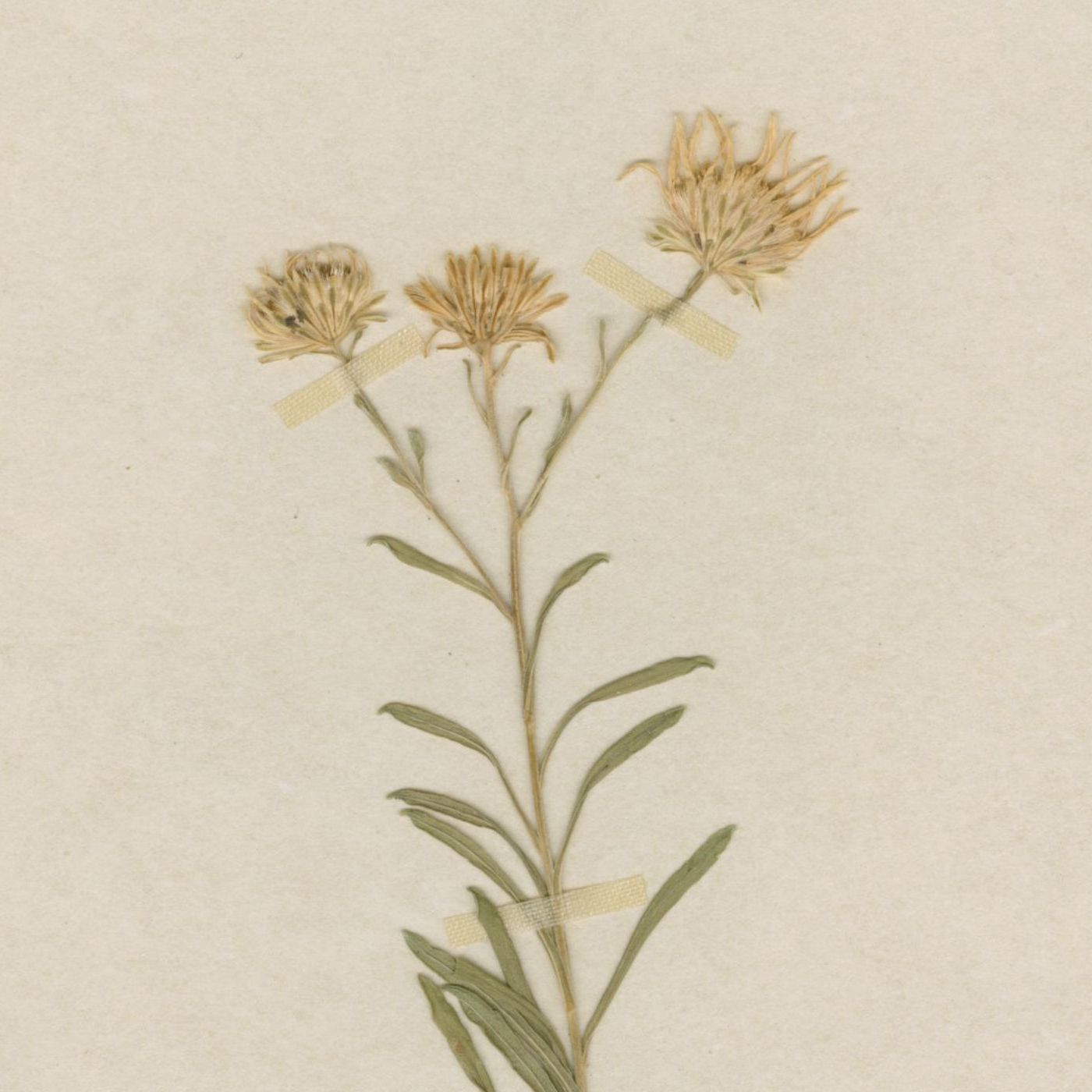

Scientific classification
- Kingdom: Plantae
- Clade: Tracheophytes
- Clade: Angiosperms
- Clade: Eudicots
- Clade: Asterids
- Order: Asterales
- Family: Asteraceae
- Tribe: Astereae
- Subtribe: Symphyotrichinae
- Genus: Symphyotrichum
- Subgenus: Symphyotrichum subg. Symphyotrichum
- Section: Symphyotrichum sect. Symphyotrichum
- Species: S. burgessii

Binomial name
- Symphyotrichum burgessii (Britton) G.L.Nesom
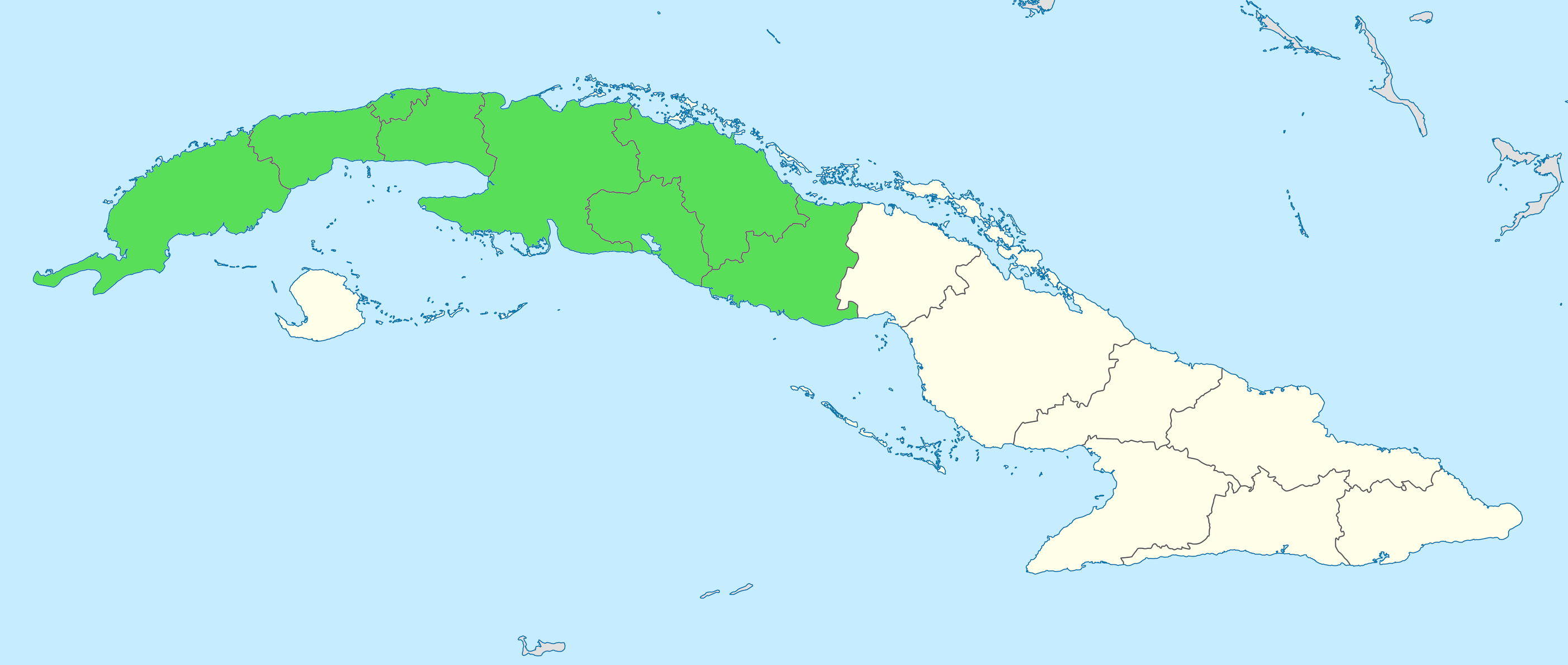
- Native distribution

Synonyms
- Aster burgessii Britton

= Symphyotrichum burgessii =

Species of flowering plant in the daisy family

Symphyotrichum burgessii (formerly Aster burgessii) is a species of flowering plant in the family Asteraceae native to Cuba. It is a perennial, herbaceous plant with a height of 5 decimeters (2 feet) or less. Its white ray florets are 5–8 millimeters (1/5–3/10 inch) in length.

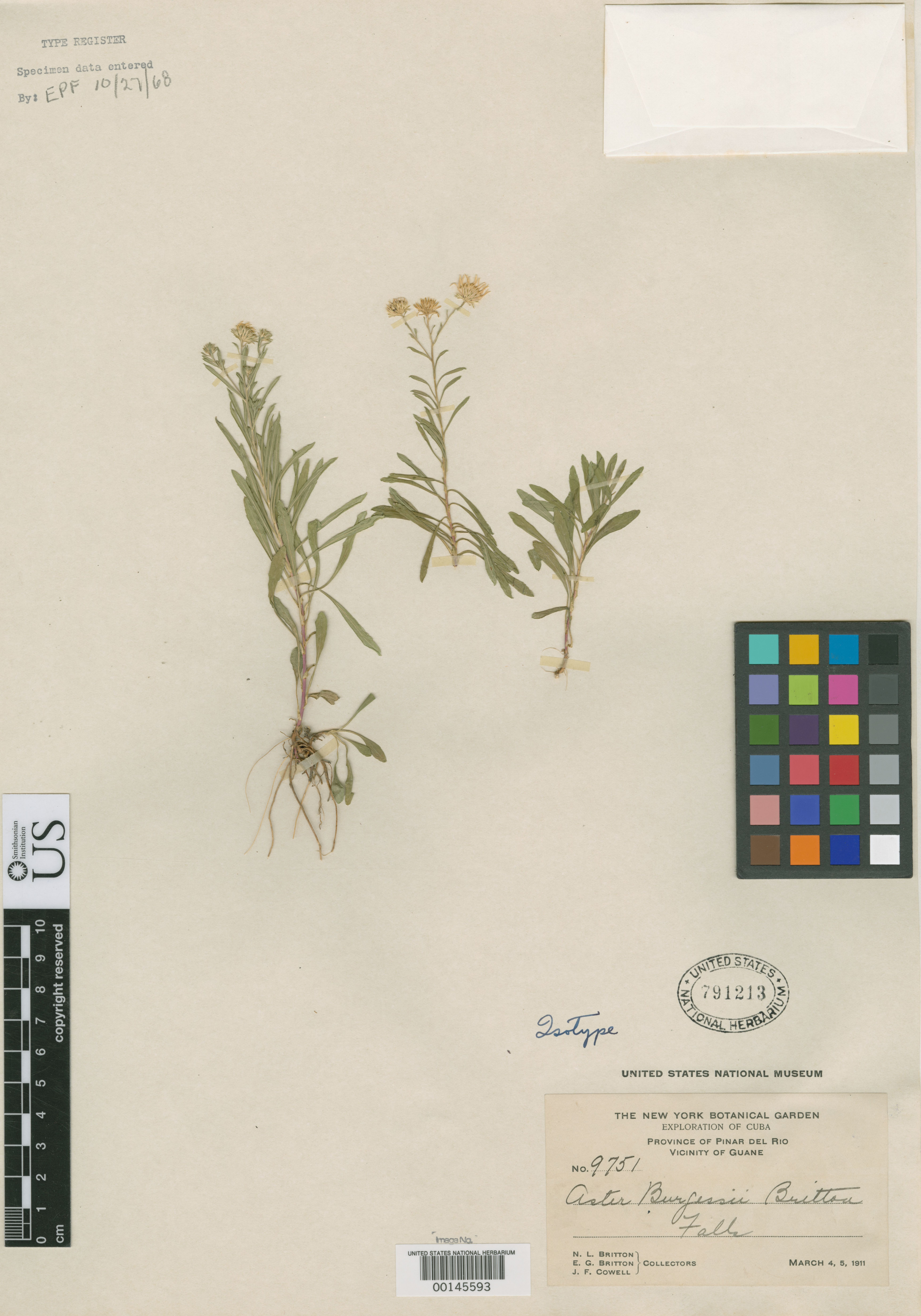
Aster burgessii isotype, collected 4 March 1911, Pinar del Río Province, Cuba.
