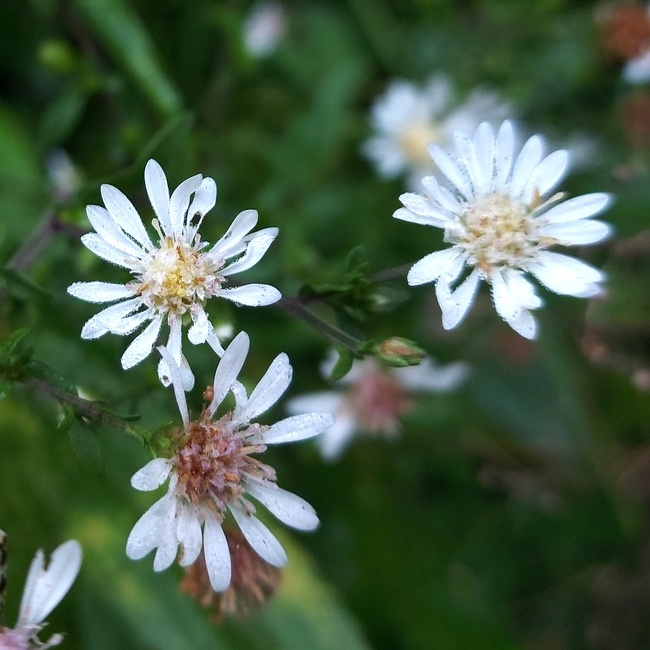

Scientific classification
- Kingdom: Plantae
- Clade: Tracheophytes
- Clade: Angiosperms
- Clade: Eudicots
- Clade: Asterids
- Order: Asterales
- Family: Asteraceae
- Tribe: Astereae
- Subtribe: Symphyotrichinae
- Genus: Symphyotrichum
- Subgenus: Symphyotrichum subg. Symphyotrichum
- Section: Symphyotrichum sect. Symphyotrichum
- Species: S. schaffneri

Binomial name
- Symphyotrichum schaffneri (S.D.Sundb. & A.G.Jones) G.L.Nesom
- Native distribution

Synonyms
- Aster schaffneri S.D.Sundb. & A.G.Jones

= Symphyotrichum schaffneri =

Species of plant in the aster family

Symphyotrichum schaffneri (formerly Aster schaffneri) is a perennial, herbaceous species of flowering plant in the family Asteraceae native to the Mexican states of Hidalgo, Puebla, and Veracruz.

== Description ==
S. schaffneri, a perennial and herbaceous plant with a creeping rhizome system, reaches heights of 30–100 centimeters (12–39 inches) on striated slender stems with hairs in lines below and more uniformly hairy lines higher up. Branching occurs in the upper portions at 15–45° angles that ascend or sometimes arch if long enough.

=== Leaves ===
The leaves have a prominent middle vein with fine, reticulate veins surrounding it. (Note: When leaf veins are reticulate, there is repeated branching of the veins on the leaf so that they look like a net.) They are hairless on top with soft hairs on the back sides, usually just on the midvein or scattered. Leaves clasp the stem up to halfway around it. The stem leaves are 4–10 cm (1 1/2–4 in) long and 1–2 cm (2/5–4/5 in) wide, with basal (bottom) leaves smaller at 1.8–2.5 cm (3/4–1 in).

=== Flowers ===
On the outside the flower heads of all members of the family Asteraceae are small bracts that look like scales. These are called phyllaries, and together they form the involucre that protects the individual flowers in the head before they open. (Note: See Asteracae § Flowers for more detail.) The involucre of each flower head of S. schaffneri is funnel-shaped or half-spherical and 4.5–7 mm (1/5–3/10 in) long. There are 25–45 phyllaries in about four graduated series with the inner phyllaries about two to three times longer than the outer phyllaries. There are 17–24 white ray florets length 4.5–7 mm (1/5–3/10 in) (sometimes up to 10 mm (2/5 in)), with 11–26 yellow then pink disk florets.

== Taxonomy ==
The species was formally described in 1986 as Aster schaffneri Schultz-Bip. ex Sundberg & A.G.Jones by American botanists Scott D. Sundberg and Almut Gitter Jones. The specimens analyzed had been collected in 1855, stored, and labeled "Aster schaffneri Schultz-Bip." but were concluded by Sundberg and Jones never to have been formally described. It had been named for J.G. Schaffner, German plant collector and pharmacist Johann Wilhelm Schaffner, later known as J.Guillermo Schaffner.

== Distribution and habitat ==
S. schaffneri is native to the Mexican states of Hidalgo, Puebla, and Veracruz. It has been found in disturbed oak forests, secondary vegetation areas, and mountain mesophilic forests in rich black or brown soils at 120–2,500 m (390–8,200 ft).
