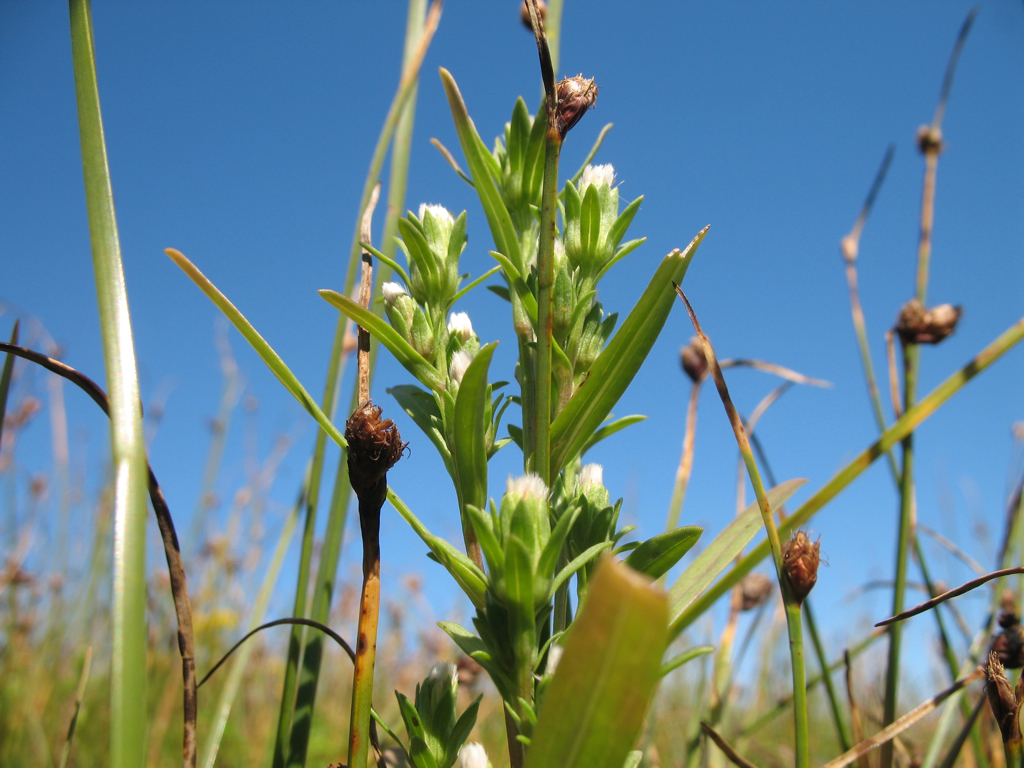
- S. laurentianum in the Magdalen Islands

Conservation status
- Critically Imperiled (NatureServe)

- Threatened (COSEWIC)

Scientific classification
- Kingdom: Plantae
- Clade: Tracheophytes
- Clade: Angiosperms
- Clade: Eudicots
- Clade: Asterids
- Order: Asterales
- Family: Asteraceae
- Tribe: Astereae
- Subtribe: Symphyotrichinae
- Genus: Symphyotrichum
- Subgenus: Symphyotrichum subg. Symphyotrichum
- Section: Symphyotrichum sect. Conyzopsis
- Species: S. laurentianum

Binomial name
- Symphyotrichum laurentianum (Fernald) G.L.Nesom
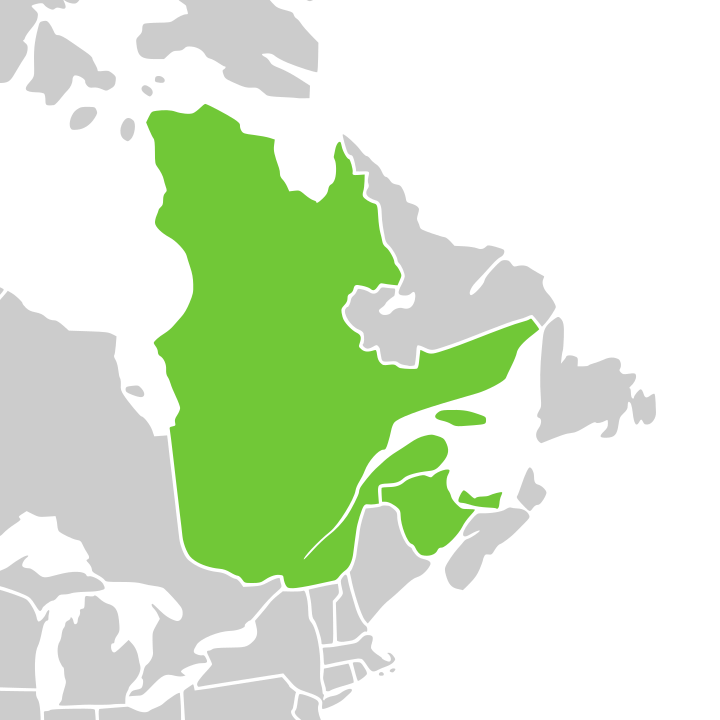
- Native distribution

Synonyms
- Basionym: Aster laurentianus Fernald; Alphabetical list: Aster ciliatus subsp. laurentianus (Fernald) Govaerts; Aster laurentianus var. contiguus Fernald; Aster laurentianus var. magdalenensis Fernald; Brachyactis ciliata subsp. laurentiana (Fernald) A.G.Jones; Brachyactis laurentiana (Fernald) Botsch.

= Symphyotrichum laurentianum =

Species of plant in the aster family

Symphyotrichum laurentianum (formerly Aster laurentianus) is a critically imperiled species of flowering plant in the family Asteraceae endemic to the southern shores of the Gulf of St. Lawrence in Canada. Commonly known as Gulf of St. Lawrence aster, it is an annual, herbaceous plant with one stem and no ray florets that grows up to about 13 centimetres (5 inches) tall.
