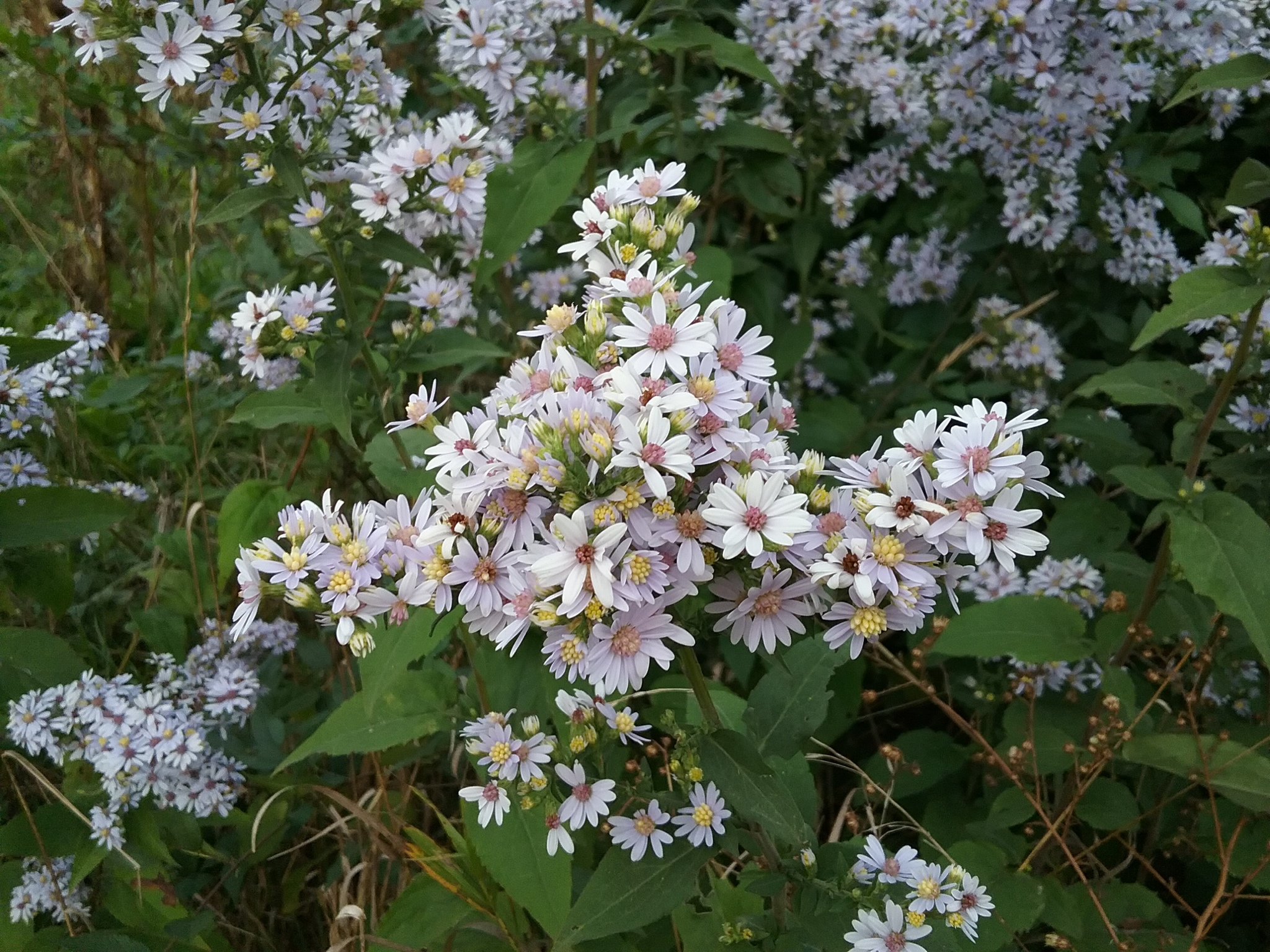

Conservation status
- Secure (NatureServe)

Scientific classification
- Kingdom: Plantae
- Clade: Tracheophytes
- Clade: Angiosperms
- Clade: Eudicots
- Clade: Asterids
- Order: Asterales
- Family: Asteraceae
- Genus: Symphyotrichum
- Subgenus: Symphyotrichum subg. Symphyotrichum
- Section: Symphyotrichum sect. Symphyotrichum
- Species: S. drummondii

Binomial name
- Symphyotrichum drummondii (Lindl.) G.L.Nesom

Varieties
- S. drummondii var. drummondii; S. drummondii var. texanum (E.S.Burgess) G.L.Nesom
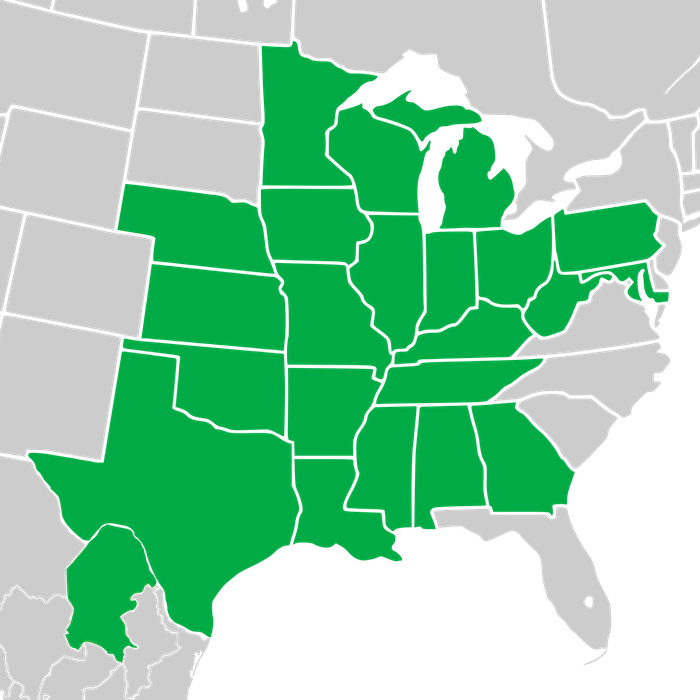
- Native distribution

Synonyms
- Synonyms of species: Aster drummondii Lindl. ex Hook.; Aster sagittifolius var. drummondii (Lindl. ex Hook.) Shinners; Synonyms of varieties S. d. var. drummondii: Aster drummondii var. rhodactis Benke; S. d. var. texanum: Aster coahuilensis S.F.Blake; Aster drummondii subsp. parviceps (Shinners) A.G.Jones; Aster drummondii subsp. texanus (E.S.Burgess) A.G.Jones; Aster drummondii var. parviceps (Shinners) A.G.Jones; Aster drummondii var. texanus (E.S.Burgess) A.G.Jones; Aster texanus E.S.Burgess; Aster texanus var. parviceps Shinners; Symphyotrichum drummondii var. parviceps (Shinners) G.L.Nesom; Symphyotrichum texanum (E.S.Burgess) Semple

= Symphyotrichum drummondii =

Species of plant in the aster family

Symphyotrichum drummondii (formerly Aster drummondii) is a species of flowering plant of the family Asteraceae native to the central and eastern United States. The common name Drummond's aster has been used for the species. There also is an accepted variety native to the south-central United States and northeast Mexico named S. drummondii var. texanum. This variety has the common name of Texas aster. The species is a perennial, herbaceous plant that may reach 120 centimeters (4 feet) in height.

== Description ==
Symphyotrichum drummondii is a perennial, herbaceous plant that may reach 120 centimeters (4 feet) in height.

=== Flowers ===
==== Florets ====
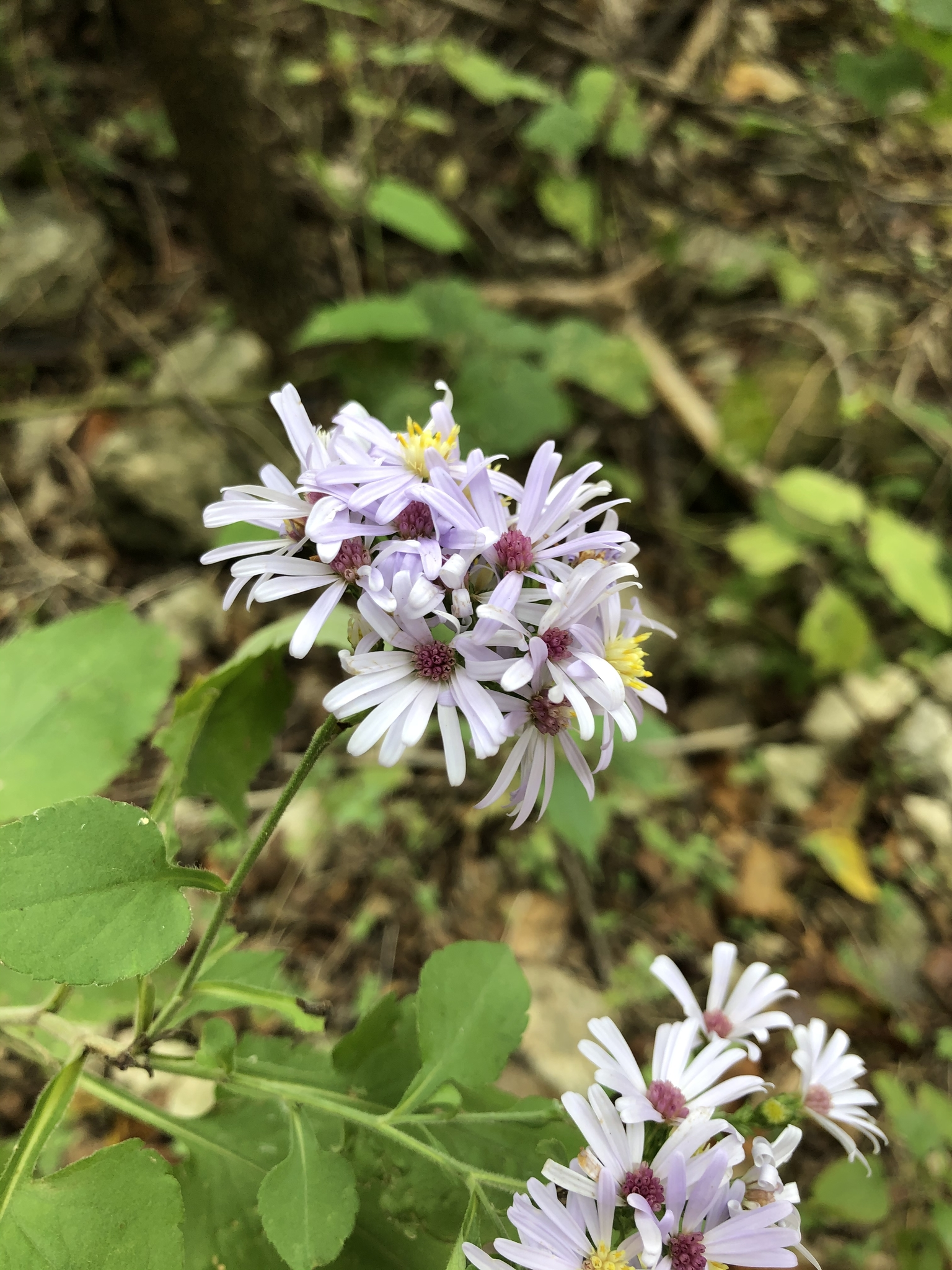

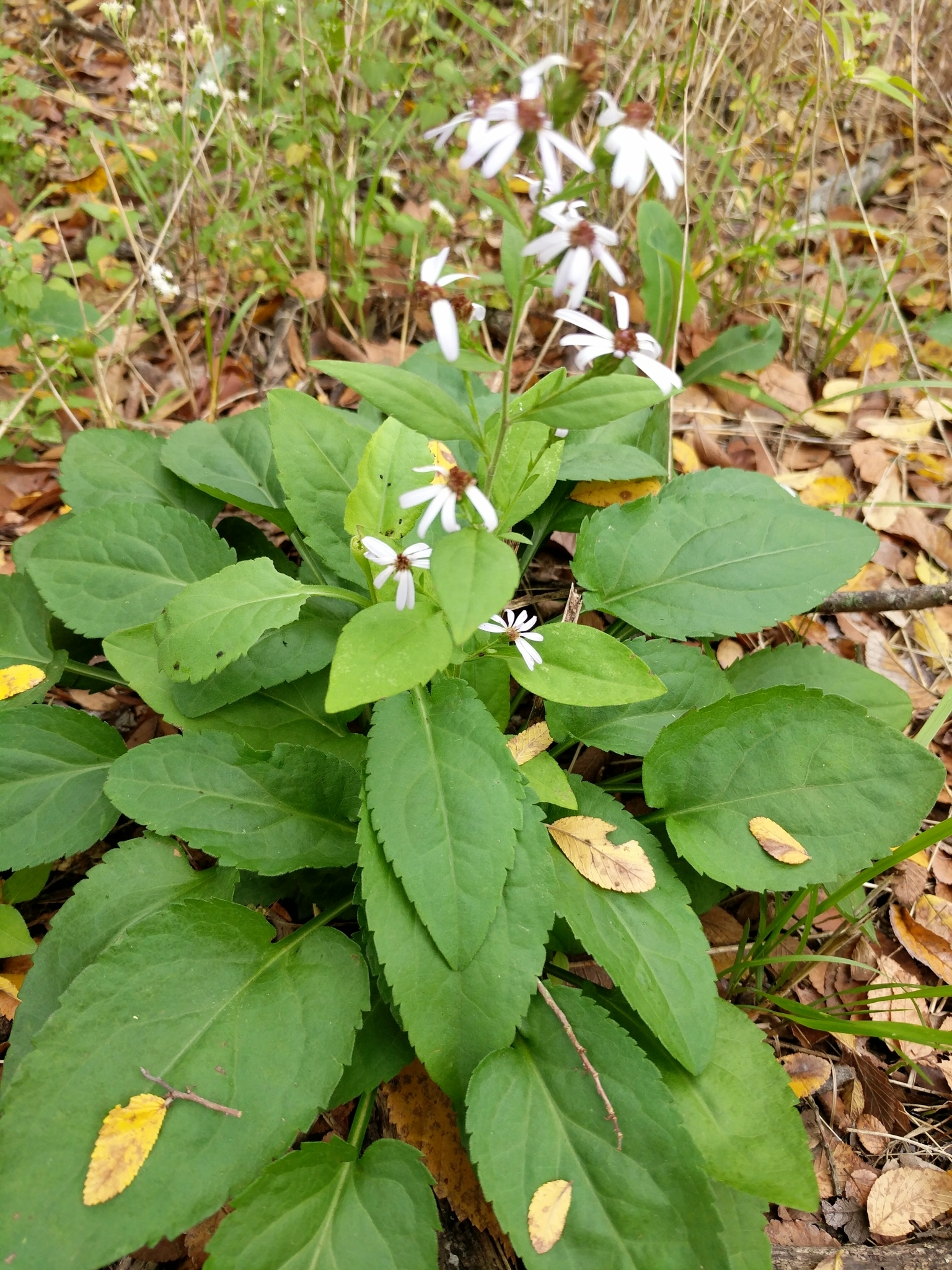

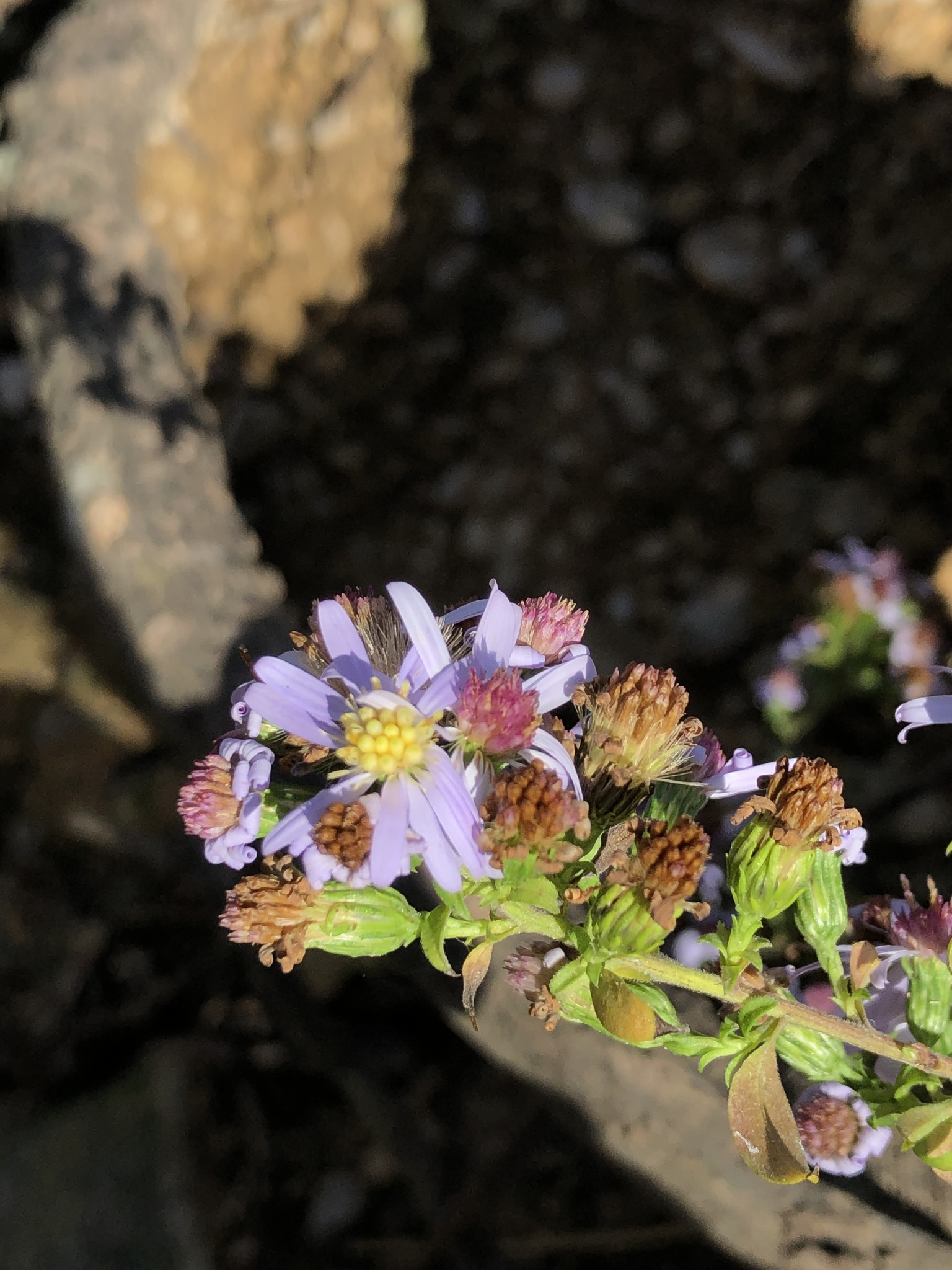

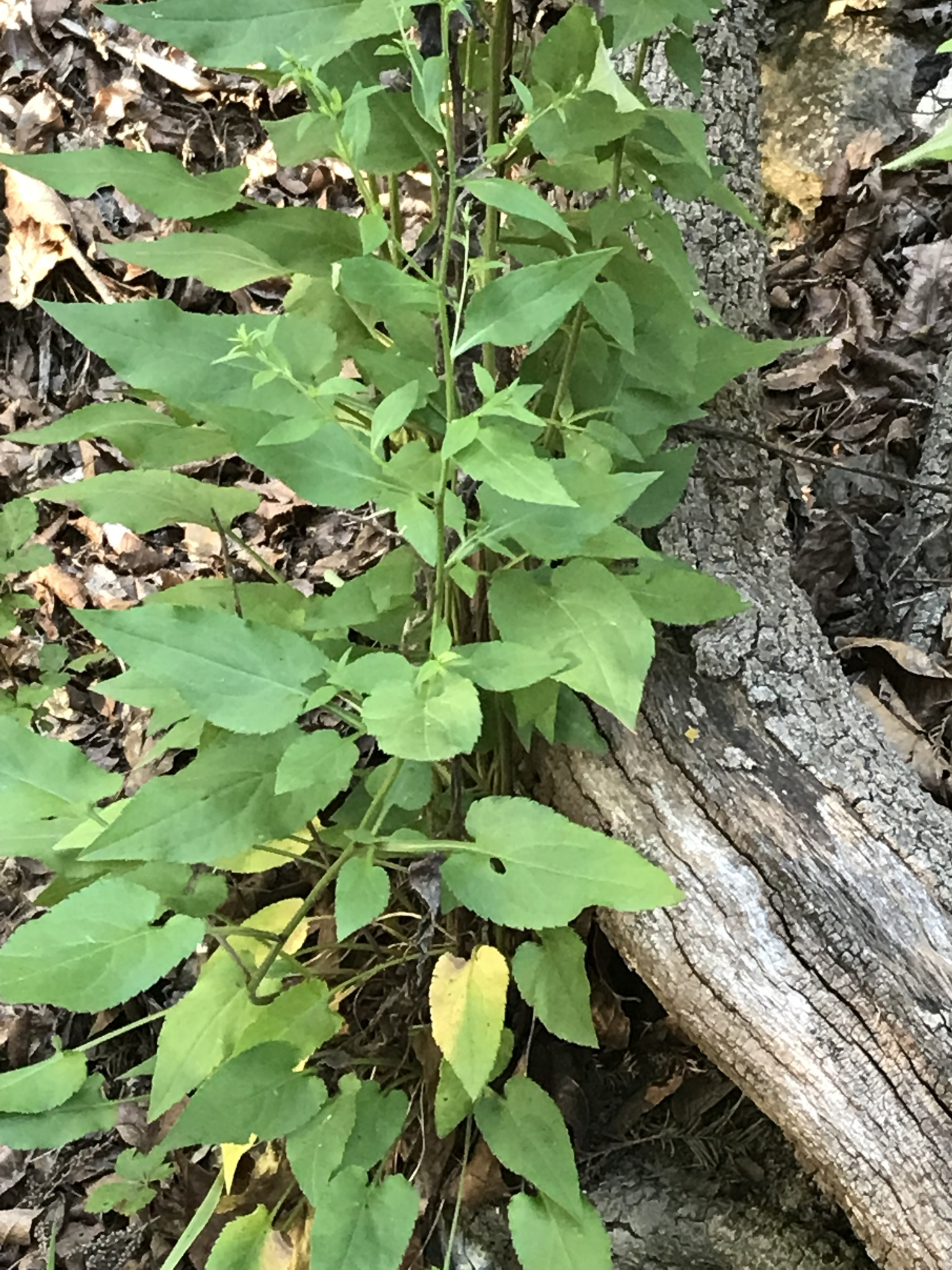

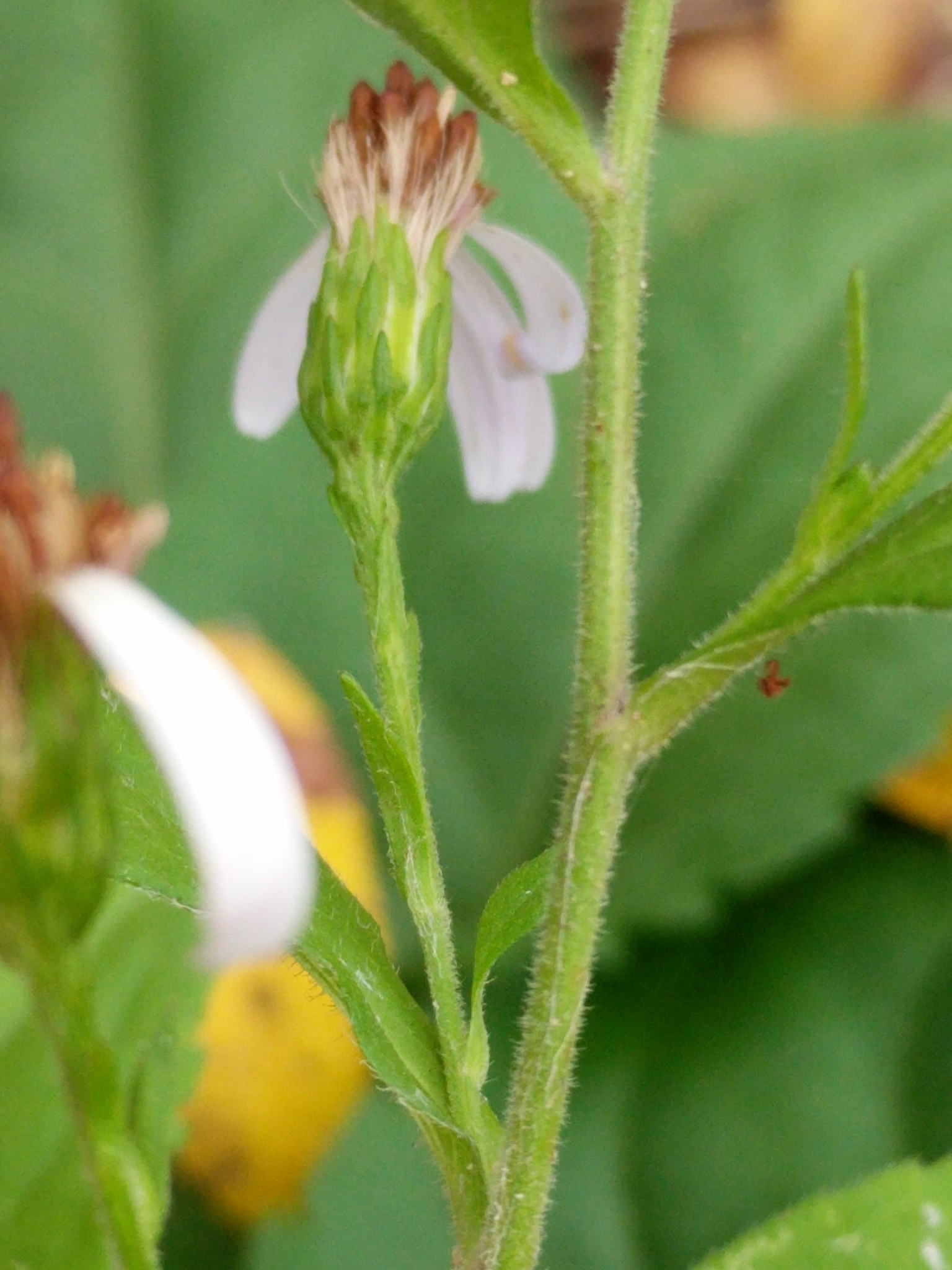

== Taxonomy ==
Symphyotrichum drummondii is classified in the subgenus Symphyotrichum, section Symphyotrichum, subsection Heterophylli, series Cordifolii. The species' common name is "Drummond's aster". In addition to the autonym of S. drummondii var. drummondii, there is an accepted variety native to the south-central United States and northeast Mexico named S. drummondii var. texanum. This variety has the common name of "Texas aster".

Placement within Symphyotrichum subg. Symphyotrichum
- - Symphyotrichum subg. Symphyotrichum
    - sect. Conyzopsis
      - S. ciliatum
      - S. frondosum
      - S. laurentianum
    - sect. Occidentales
      - S. chilense
      - S. eatonii
      - S. foliaceum
      - S. greatae
      - S. hallii
      - S. hendersonii
      - S. jessicae
      - S. lentum
      - S. molle
      - S. spathulatum
      - S. subspicatum
    - sect. Turbinelli
      S. turbinellum
    - sect. Symphyotrichum
      - ssect. Dumosi
        - S. boreale
        - S. bullatum
        - S. burgessii
        - S. carnerosanum
        - S. dumosum
        - S. eulae
        - S. lanceolatum
        - S. lateriflorum
        - S. leone
        - S. nahanniense
        - S. ontarionis
        - S. praealtum
        - S. racemosum
        - S. schaffneri
        - S. simmondsii
        - S. tradescantii
        - S. welshii
      - ssect. Heterophylli
        - ser. Concinni
          - S. laeve
          - S. oolentangiense
        - ser. Cordifolii
          - S. anomalum
          - S. ciliolatum
          - S. cordifolium
          - S. drummondii
          - S. shortii
          - S. undulatum
          - S. urophyllum
      - ssect. Porteriani
        - S. depauperatum
        - S. kentuckiense
        - S. parviceps
        - S. pilosum
        - S. porteri
      - ssect. Symphyotrichum
        - ser. Punicei
          - S. elliottii
          - S. firmum
          - S. prenanthoides
          - S. puniceum
          - S. rhiannon
        - ser. Symphyotrichum
          - S. anticostense
          - S. novi-belgii
          - S. retroflexum
          - S. robynsianum
  Cladogram references

=== Chromosomes ===
S. drummondii has a monoploid number (also called "base number") of eight chromosomes (x = 8). Diploid and tetraploid specimens of the autonym have been found with total chromosome counts of 16 and 32, respectively. Tetraploids have been found of S. drummondii var. texanum.

== Distribution and habitat ==
Symphyotrichum drummondii is native to the U.S. states of Alabama, Arkansas, Georgia, Illinois, Indiana, Iowa, Kansas, Kentucky, Louisiana, Maryland, Michigan, Minnesota, Mississippi, Missouri, Nebraska, Ohio, Oklahoma, Pennsylvania, Tennessee, Texas, West Virginia, and Wisconsin, as well as to the state of Coahuila in northeast Mexico.

== Conservation ==
As of October 2024, NatureServe listed S. drummondii as Secure (G5) globally; Secure (S5) in Kentucky; Apparently Secure (S4) in Iowa and Mississippi; Imperiled (S2) in Michigan and Ohio; and, Critically Imperiled (S1) in Maryland, Pennsylvania, and West Virginia. The species' global status was last reviewed on 2 May 1988. S. drummondii var. texanum is listed as a Vulnerable Variety (T3), with Kansas and Mississippi as Vulnerable (S3), and Louisiana as Critically Imperiled (S1). This variety's global status was last reviewed by NatureServe on 10 April 2006.
