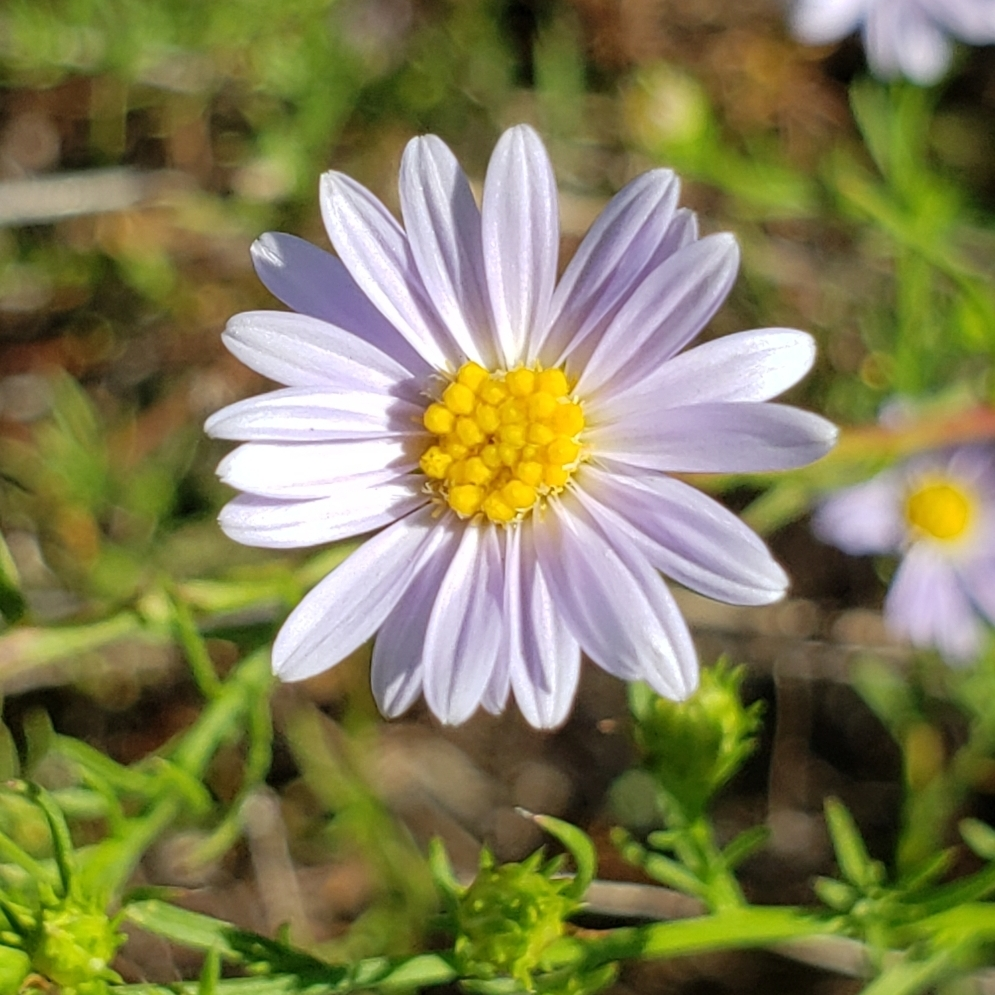
- S. kentuckiense in Hamilton County, Tennessee

Conservation status
- Apparently Secure (NatureServe)

Scientific classification
- Kingdom: Plantae
- Clade: Tracheophytes
- Clade: Angiosperms
- Clade: Eudicots
- Clade: Asterids
- Order: Asterales
- Family: Asteraceae
- Genus: Symphyotrichum
- Species: S. kentuckiense

Binomial name
- Symphyotrichum kentuckiense (Britton) Medley

Synonyms
- Basionym: Aster kentuckiensis Britton

= Symphyotrichum kentuckiense =

Species of plant in the aster family

Symphyotrichum kentuckiense (formerly Aster kentuckiensis) is a rare species of flowering plant in the Asteraceae family and is commonly known as Kentucky aster, Price's aster, Miss Price's aster, Sadie's aster, or lavender oldfield aster. It is a perennial, herbaceous plant that is endemic to broken limestone cedar glades and roadsides in Alabama, Georgia, Kentucky, and Tennessee. It blooms from August through October, reaches heights between 30 centimeters (1 foot) and 100 cm (3.3 ft), and has green to reddish-brown stems. It is a nearly hairless plant with blue to blue-violet ray florets.

Symphyotrichum priceae was once considered the name of the plant, with S. kentuckiense and Aster kentuckiensis placed as its taxonomic synonyms. In 2021, botanist Max E. Medley proposed that this treatment was incorrect. As of October 2022, what was originally described as Aster priceae was accepted to be the hybrid between S. kentuckiense and Symphyotrichum pilosum var. pilosum and has been named Symphyotrichum × priceae. The hybrid is a somewhat hairy plant rather than a hairless one, and its characteristics are intermediate between its parents.

NatureServe considers S. kentuckiense (Note: documented or listed as Symphyotrichum priceae) Apparently Secure (G4) globally and Imperiled (S2) in Kentucky where the holotype was collected near Bowling Green in October 1898 by botanist Sadie F. Price. Aster kentuckiensis was then formally described by botanist Nathaniel Lord Britton in 1901.

== Description ==
S. kentuckiense stem and leaf morphology

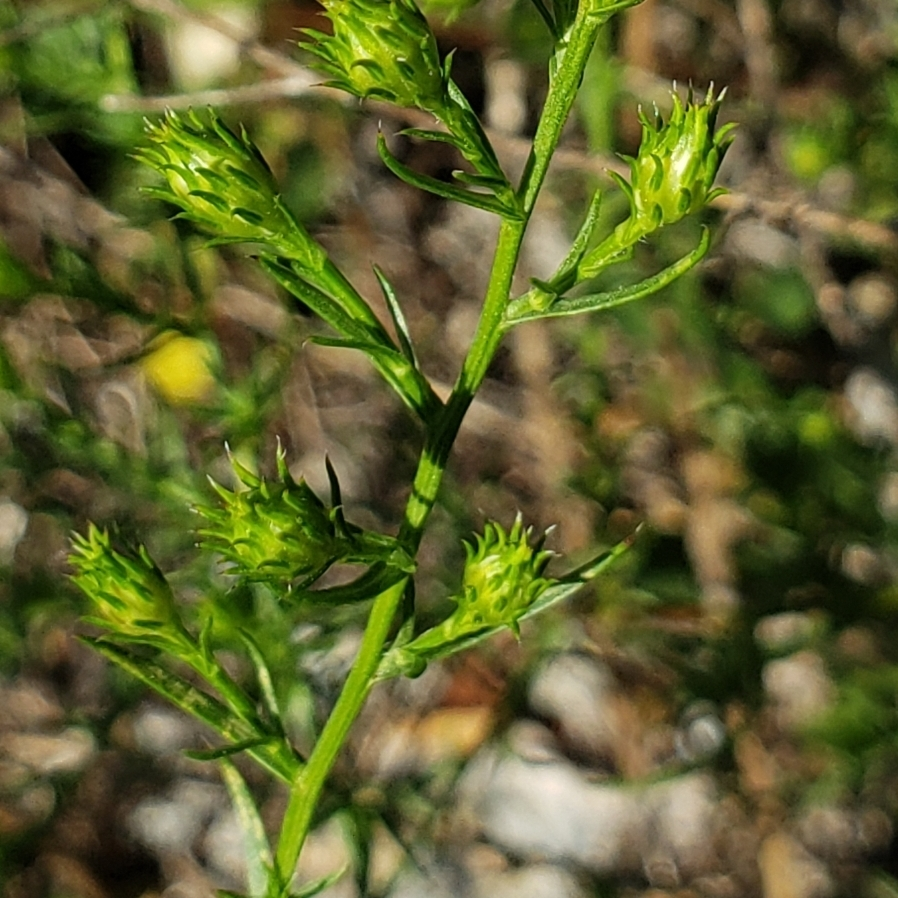
Upper stem detail of a non-blooming inflorescence

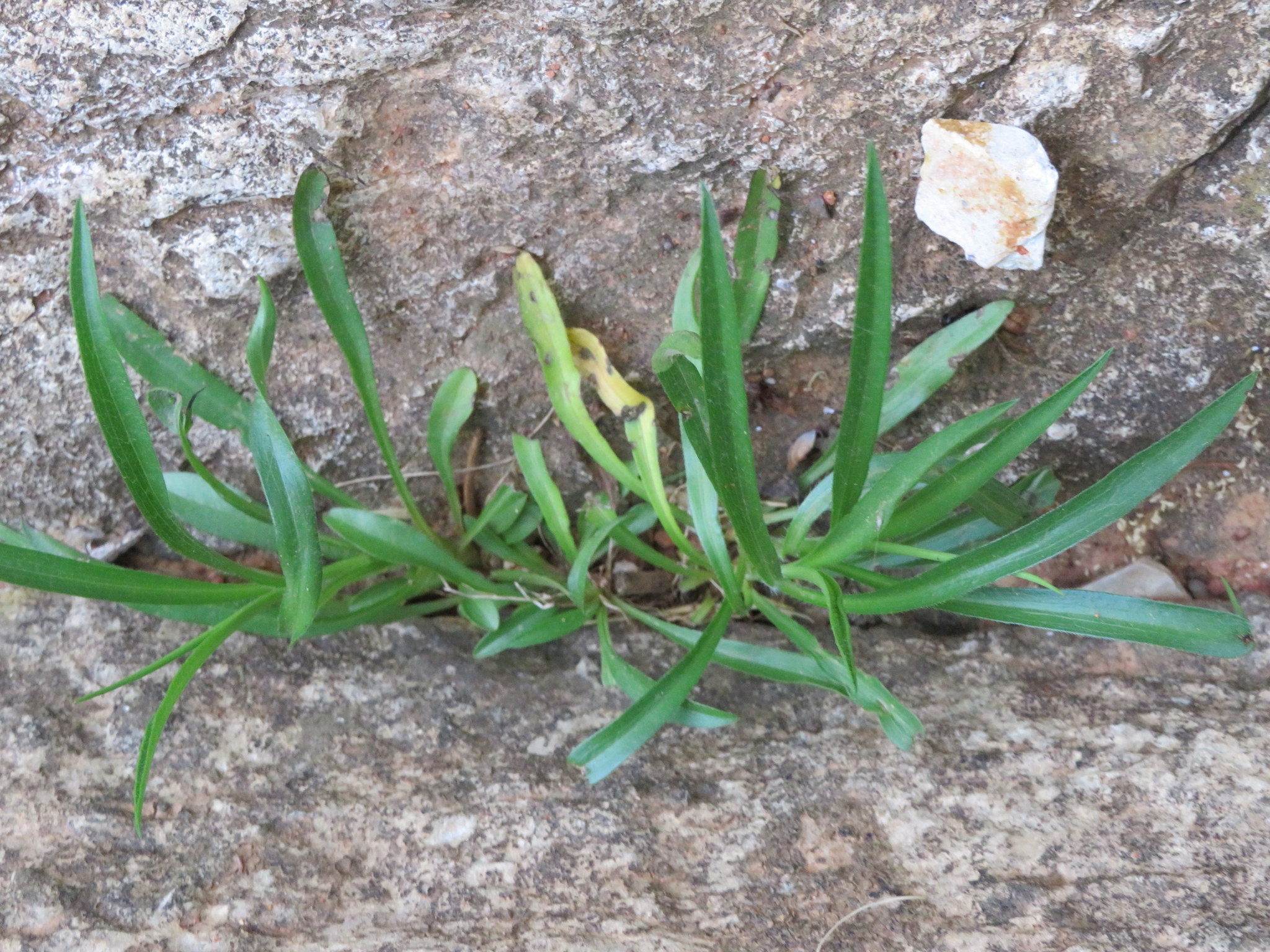
Basal leaves from early season growth that have sprouted from a crack in limestone

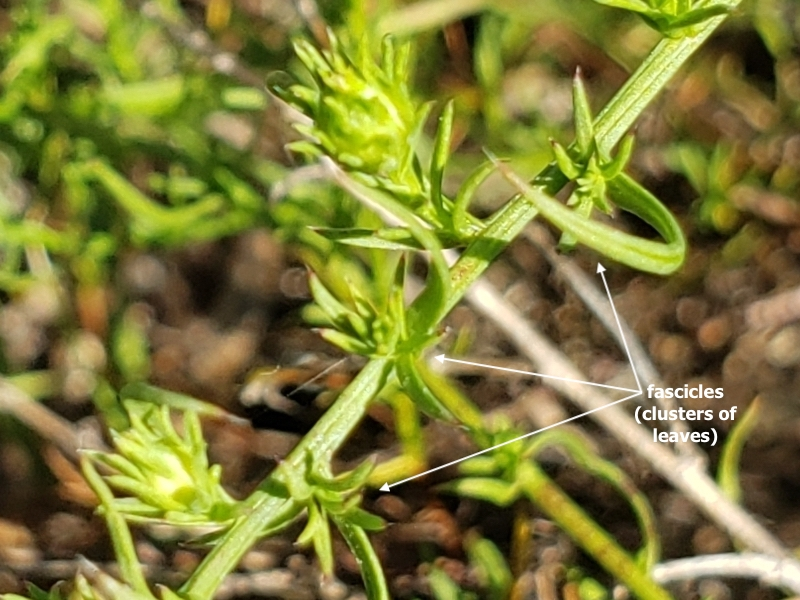
Inflorescence branch photo with fascicles (clusters of leaves) labeled with arrows

Symphyotrichum kentuckiense is a rare perennial, herbaceous plant endemic to areas of Alabama, Georgia, Kentucky, and Tennessee in the southeastern United States. It flowers from August through October, growing to heights between 30 centimeters (1 foot) and 100 cm (3.3 ft) from a cespitose rootstock. The rootstock has short, branched underground caudices and no rhizomes.

=== Stems ===
S. kentuckiense has from one to three or more glabrous (hairless) stems extending from the root base. These stems can be decumbent, growing horizontally along the ground and turned up at the ends, (Note: Copied content from Glossary of botanical terms; see that page's history for attribution.) to ascending. They are green to reddish-brown.

=== Leaves ===
The species has thin alternate leaves that are dark green to bluish-green with glabrous faces. Leaves occur at the base, on stems, and on inflorescence branches. Depending upon the locations of the leaves on the plant, the apices, or tips, can be noticeably pointed (acute (Note: Acute is defined as a short and sharp point at less than a 90° angle.) to acuminate (Note: Acuminate is defined as "[t]apering to a long point in a concave manner". (Copied definition from Glossary of leaf morphology; see that page's history for attribution.))), obtuse, (Note: Obtuse is defined as a blunt angle greater than 90°.) mucronate, (Note: Mucronate is defined as "end[ing] abruptly in a sharp point as a continuation of the midrib". (Copied definition from Glossary of leaf morphology; see that page's history for attribution.)) or cuspidate. (Note: Cuspidate is defined as having a tip with a sharp and long rigid cusp.)

Basal leaves are either without leafstalks (called petioles), making them sessile, or they have very short petioles with sheathing wings that are fringed with hairs on their edges, making them ciliate. The basal leaves are oblanceolate (Note: Oblanceolate is defined as "[m]uch longer than wide and with the widest portion near the tip, reversed lanceolate". (Copied definition from Glossary of leaf morphology; see that page's history for attribution.)) to obovate (Note: Obovate is defined as "[t]eardrop-shaped, stem attaches to the tapering end; reversed ovate". (Copied definition from Glossary of leaf morphology; see that page's history for attribution.)) with obtuse apices, and their bases are cuneate (Note: Cuneate base is defined as "[t]riangular, wedge-shaped" where the leaf attaches to the stem. (Part of this definition was copied from Glossary of leaf morphology; see that page's history for attribution.)) (wedge-shaped) to attenuate. (Note: Attenuate base is defined as "[h]aving leaf tissue taper down the petiole to a narrow base, always having some leaf material on each side of the petiole". (Copied definition from Glossary of leaf morphology; see that page's history for attribution.)) Their margins (edges) are entire, meaning they are smooth with no teeth or lobes. Rarely, they can be sparsely saw-toothed, also called serrate. Basal leaves range in lengths from 10 to 70 millimeters (0.4 to 2.8 inches) and widths from 3 to 5 mm (0.12 to 0.20 in). The basal leaves grow in a rosette that develops prior to flowering. These leaves wither or die during plant growth, and at the time of flowering, another rosette of basal leaves forms.

Lower and middle stem leaves are sessile or may have petioles with narrow wings. They usually wither by the time the plant flowers. The leaves are oblanceolate to linear-oblanceolate and range in lengths of 70 to 105 mm (2.8 to 4.1 in) and widths of 2 to 4 mm (0.08 to 0.16 in). They have attenuate to cuneate bases that can be auriculate (Note: Auriculate base is defined as "[h]aving ear-shaped appendages reaching beyond the attachment to the petiole or to the stem". (Copied definition from Glossary of leaf morphology; see that page's history for attribution.)) (shaped like earlobes) or clasp the stem.

The linear-lanceolate (Note: Linear is defined as long and narrow; an example is a blade of lawn grass.) (Note: Lanceolate is defined as "[l]ong, wider in the middle, shaped like a lance tip". (Copied definition from Glossary of leaf morphology; see that page's history for attribution.)) to narrowly subulate (Note: Subulate is defined as "[a]wl-shaped with a tapering point". (Copied definition from Glossary of leaf morphology; see that page's history for attribution.)) distal (Note: Distal means farther away from the base, or in this case, higher on the stem closer to the branches with the flower heads.) leaves are sessile and get progressively smaller as they approach the flower heads. Distal leaf bases are subauriculate (somewhat earlobe-shaped) and can clasp the stem. Their margins are entire but have cilia closer to the leaf base. These leaves are glabrous on both sides and range in lengths of 5 to 65 mm (0.2 to 2.6 in) and widths of 1 to 4 mm (0.04 to 0.16 in). The small, 3-nerved inflorescence leaves are often formed in clusters called fascicles.

=== Flowers ===
S. kentuckiense flower head morphology

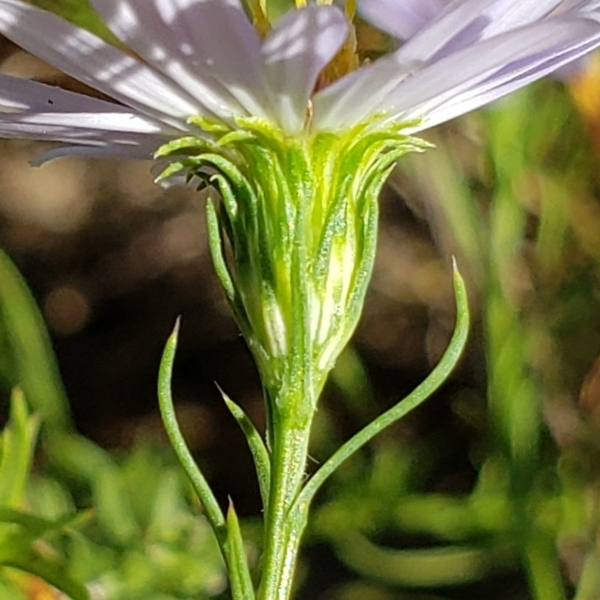
Bract, involucre, and phyllary detail

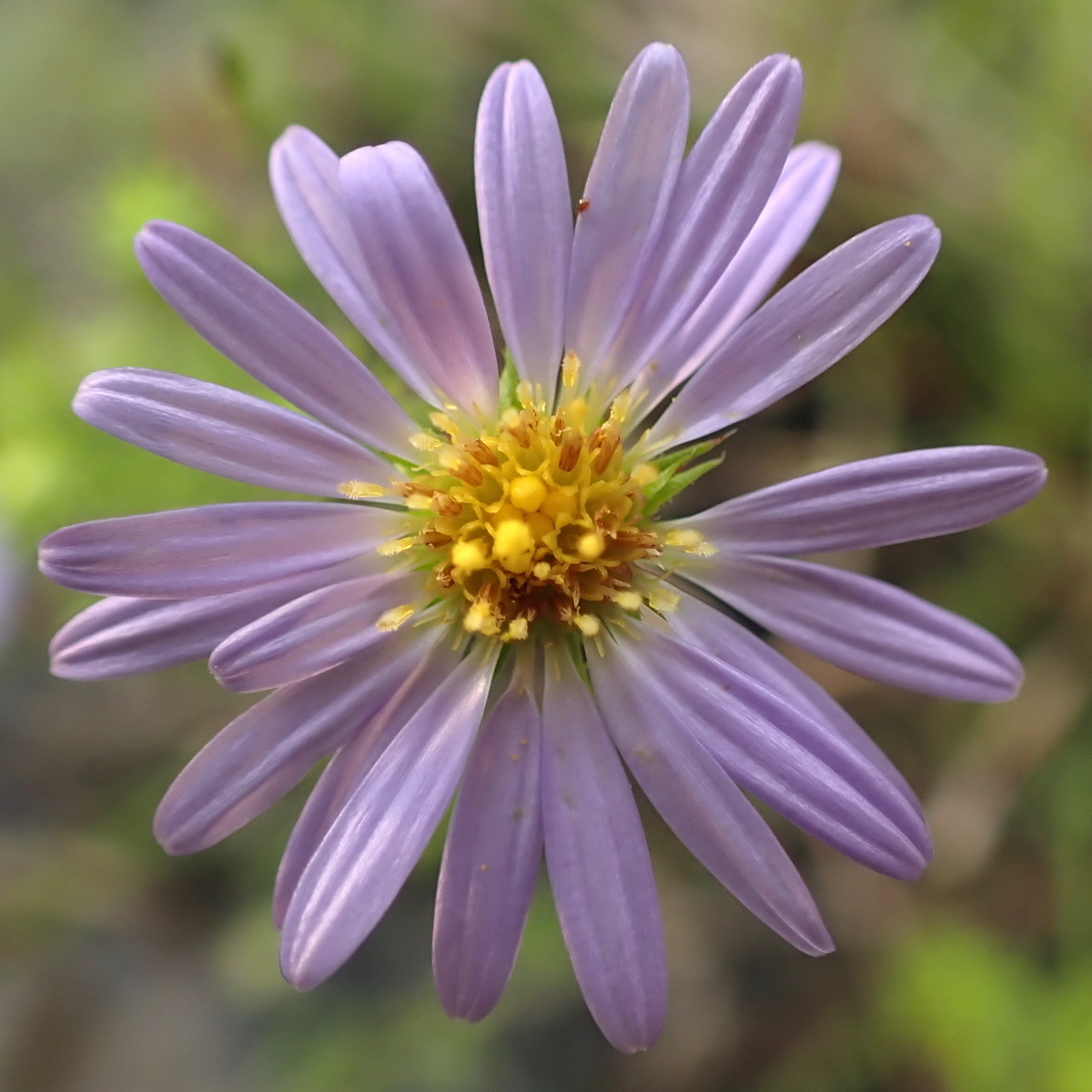
Flower head, top view

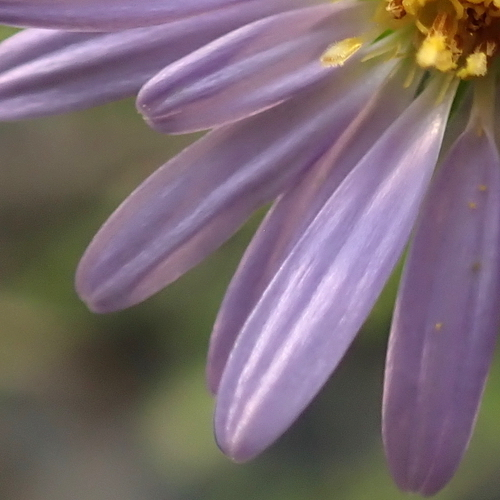
Ray floret detail

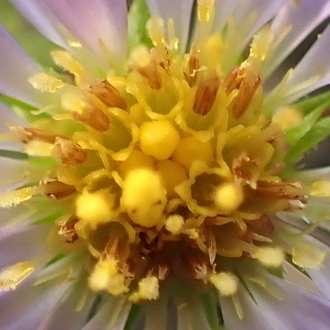
Disk floret detail

Diagram of a cypsela, with pappi labeled

Symphyotrichum kentuckiense is a late-summer and fall blooming perennial, with flower heads that are about 25 mm (1 in) wide and have blue, blue-violet, pink, or purple ray florets opening August through October. The flower heads grow in leafy paniculiform to racemiform arrays on inflorescences that are straight and ascending or can have wide angles between the branches. Divaricate branching can cause the plant to appear as a small shrub. At times, the flower heads can be secund, appearing on one side of the branch.

Each flower head is on a glabrous peduncle that ranges from 4 to 20 mm (0.16 to 0.79 in) in length. There are 3 to 6 linear to subulate and stiff, glabrous bracts on each peduncle. Bracts closest to the heads can be so long that their lengths exceed the heights of the involucres.

==== Involucres and phyllaries ====
On the outsides of the flower heads of all members of the family Asteraceae are small bracts that look like scales. These are called phyllaries, and together they form the involucre that protects the individual flowers in the head before they open. (Note: See Asteraceae § Flowers for more detail.) The involucres of Symphyotrichum kentuckiense are cylindric in shape and usually 5.5 to 7.1 mm (0.22 to 0.28 in) in length, although they can be as short as 4.5 mm (0.18 in) and as long as 8.5 mm (0.33 in).

The glabrous phyllaries of S. kentuckiense are in 4 to 6 unequal to subequal rows, linear-subulate in shape, and gradually acuminate. The margins of each phyllary may appear white or light green but are translucent. The phyllaries have green chlorophyllous zones that are diamond-shaped to lanceolate with apices that are acute to long-acuminate, mucronate to apiculate, (Note: Apiculate is defined as "tapering and ending in a short [and] slender point". (Copied definition from Glossary of leaf morphology; see that page's history for attribution.)) such that they could be tapering to a slender point. Their apices are involute (rolled inwards) and spread away from the head.

==== Florets ====
Each flower head is made up of ray florets and disk florets. The 20 to 28 (Note: Outside range about 13 to 34) ray florets grow in one series and are usually blue-violet, rarely white. They are usually between 9 and 15 mm (0.35 and 0.59 in) in length, but can be as short as 7 mm (0.28 in) and as long as 19 mm (0.75 in). They are 0.6 to 2.1 mm (0.02 to 0.08 in) wide.

The disks have 33 to 51 (Note: Outside range about 28 to 68) florets that start out as yellow and after opening, turn brown after pollination. Each disk floret is 3.4 to 4.6 mm (0.13 to 0.18 in) in depth (sometimes up to 5.5 mm (0.22 in)), and is made up of 5 petals, collectively a corolla, which open into 5 lanceolate lobes comprising 0.5 to 1 mm (0.02 to 0.04 in) of the depth of the floret.

=== Fruit ===
The fruits (seeds) of Symphyotrichum kentuckiense are not true achenes but are cypselae, resembling an achene but surrounded by a calyx sheath. This is true for all members of the Asteraceae family. After pollination, they become tan to brown with an obovoid shape, 1.5 to 2.1 mm (0.06 to 0.08 in) in length with 4 to 5 thin nerves, and with a few stiff, slender bristles on their surfaces (strigillose). They also have tufts of hairs (pappi) which are white and 3 to 5 mm (0.12 to 0.20 in) in length.

=== Chromosomes ===
The species has a monoploid number (also called base number) of eight chromosomes (x = 8). It has eight sets of its chromosomes, meaning it is octaploid, giving it a total chromosome count of 64.

== Taxonomy ==
=== Classification ===
Symphyotrichum kentuckiense is classified in subgenus Symphyotrichum section Symphyotrichum subsection Porteriani. This subsection contains four species in addition to S. kentuckiense: S. depauperatum, S. parviceps, S. pilosum, and S. porteri. It is the only octaploid within the subsection.

Symphyotrichum subg. Symphyotrichum cladogram
- - Symphyotrichum subg. Symphyotrichum
    - sect. Conyzopsis (Note: Nesom, G.L. (September 1994). "Review of the Taxonomy of Aster sensu lato (Asteraceae: Astereae), Emphasizing the New World Species". Phytologia. 77 (3): 141–297. ISSN 0031-9430 – via Biodiversity Heritage Library.)
      - S. ciliatum
      - S. frondosum
      - S. laurentianum
    - sect. Occidentales
      - S. chilense
      - S. eatonii
      - S. foliaceum
      - S. greatae
      - S. hallii
      - S. hendersonii
      - S. jessicae
      - S. lentum
      - S. molle
      - S. spathulatum
      - S. subspicatum
    - sect. Turbinelli
      S. turbinellum
    - sect. Symphyotrichum
      - ssect. Dumosi
        - S. boreale
        - S. bullatum
        - S. burgessii
        - S. carnerosanum
        - S. dumosum
        - S. eulae
        - S. lanceolatum
        - S. lateriflorum
        - S. leone
        - S. nahanniense
        - S. ontarionis
        - S. praealtum
        - S. racemosum
        - S. schaffneri
        - S. simmondsii
        - S. tradescantii
        - S. welshii
      - ssect. Heterophylli
        - ser. Concinni
          - S. laeve
          - S. oolentangiense
        - ser. Cordifolii
          - S. anomalum
          - S. ciliolatum
          - S. cordifolium
          - S. drummondii
          - S. shortii
          - S. undulatum
          - S. urophyllum
      - ssect. Porteriani
        - S. depauperatum
        - S. kentuckiense
        - S. parviceps
        - S. pilosum
        - S. porteri
      - ssect. Symphyotrichum
        - ser. Punicei
          - S. elliottii
          - S. firmum
          - S. prenanthoides
          - S. puniceum
          - S. rhiannon
        - ser. Symphyotrichum
          - S. anticostense
          - S. novi-belgii
          - S. retroflexum
          - S. robynsianum
  Cladogram references

=== History ===
The basionym of Symphyotrichum kentuckiense is Aster kentuckiensis. Its name with author citations is Symphyotrichum kentuckiense (Britton) Medley. The plant was formally described as a unique species and named Aster kentuckiensis Britton by botanist Nathaniel Lord Britton in 1901 in his publication Manual of the Flora of the Northern States and Canada. The sample that was used by Britton as the holotype for A. kentuckiensis was collected in October 1898 by Sadie F. Price near Bowling Green, Kentucky.

=== Hybrid Symphyotrichum × priceae ===
At the same time that she collected what became the holotype for Aster kentuckiensis, Sadie F. Price collected a similar plant that Britton named Aster priceae Britton and included in its description that it is pubescent, or with soft hairs. In later floras by other authors, A. kentuckiensis was synonymized to A. priceae. In a 2021 journal article by botanist Max E. Medley, elements of the morphologies of A. kentuckiensis and A. priceae were confirmed to have been erroneously combined, and sometimes the former was ignored. Notably, this treatment resulted in floras written prior to Medley's paper applying the glabrous trait to A. priceae and S. priceae, which is incorrect, as this plant is puberulent.

In 1948, botanist Arthur Cronquist reduced Aster priceae to a variety of A. pilosus named A. pilosus var. priceae (Britton) Cronquist which Medley posited was a conclusion "based on misidentified specimens and [was] not appropriate." Subsequently, it was considered the non-hybrid species Symphyotrichum priceae (Britton) G.L.Nesom with S. kentuckiense and A. kentuckiensis as its taxonomic synonyms.

Medley suggested that the Aster priceae holotype and Britton's protologue were of the hybrid A. kentuckiensis × A. pilosus var. pilosus. He gave it the hybrid designation and acknowledged the name as Symphyotrichum × priceae (Britton) G.L.Nesom, with Aster priceae Britton as its basionym. Corrected synonyms of S. × priceae are A. priceae and A. pilosus var. priceae (Britton) Cronquist. As of October 2022, this hybrid name was accepted by Plants of the World Online (POWO). The hybrid is a puberulent plant rather than a glabrous one, and its characteristics are intermediate between its parents.

Comparison of S. kentuckiense, S. × priceae, and S. pilosum var. pilosum

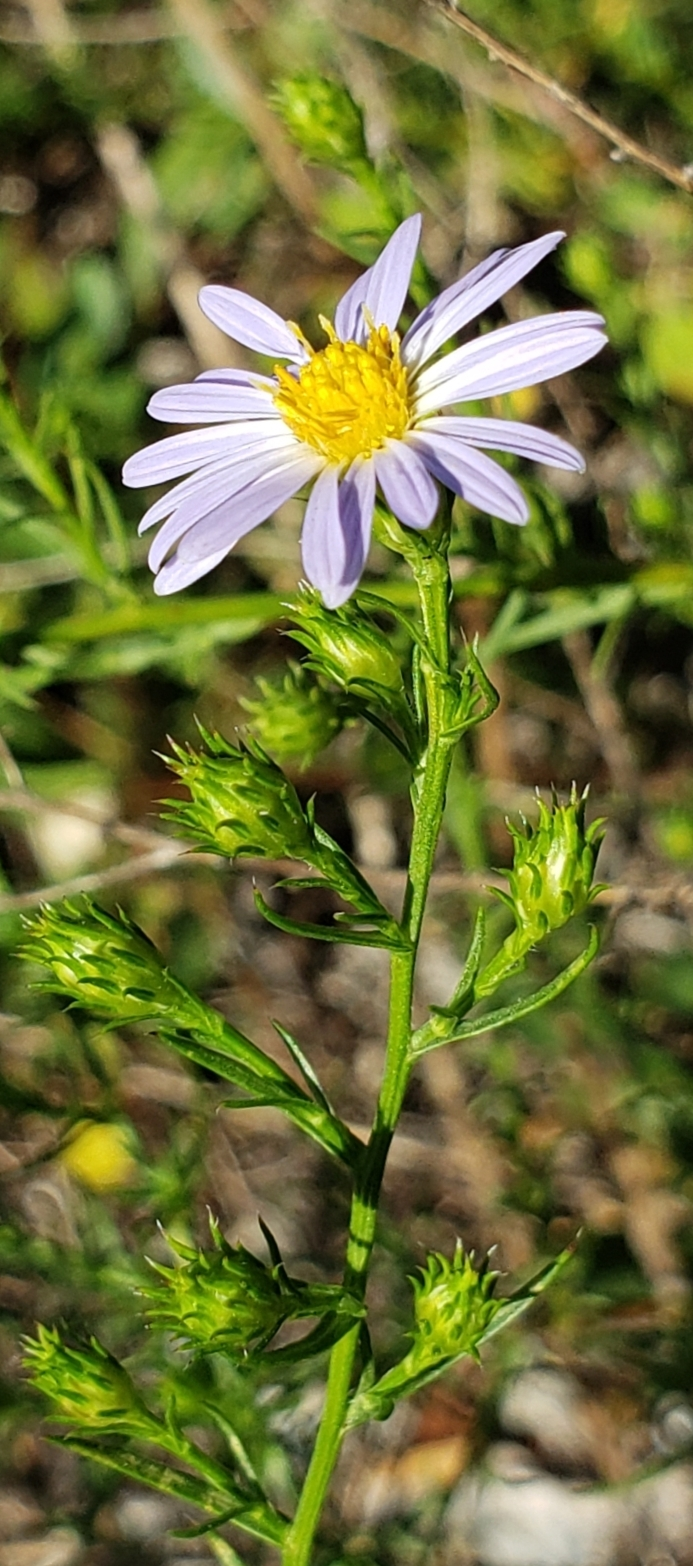
Part of an inflorescence of S. kentuckiense showing glabrous stem, many flower heads, and one in bloom with blue-violet ray florets

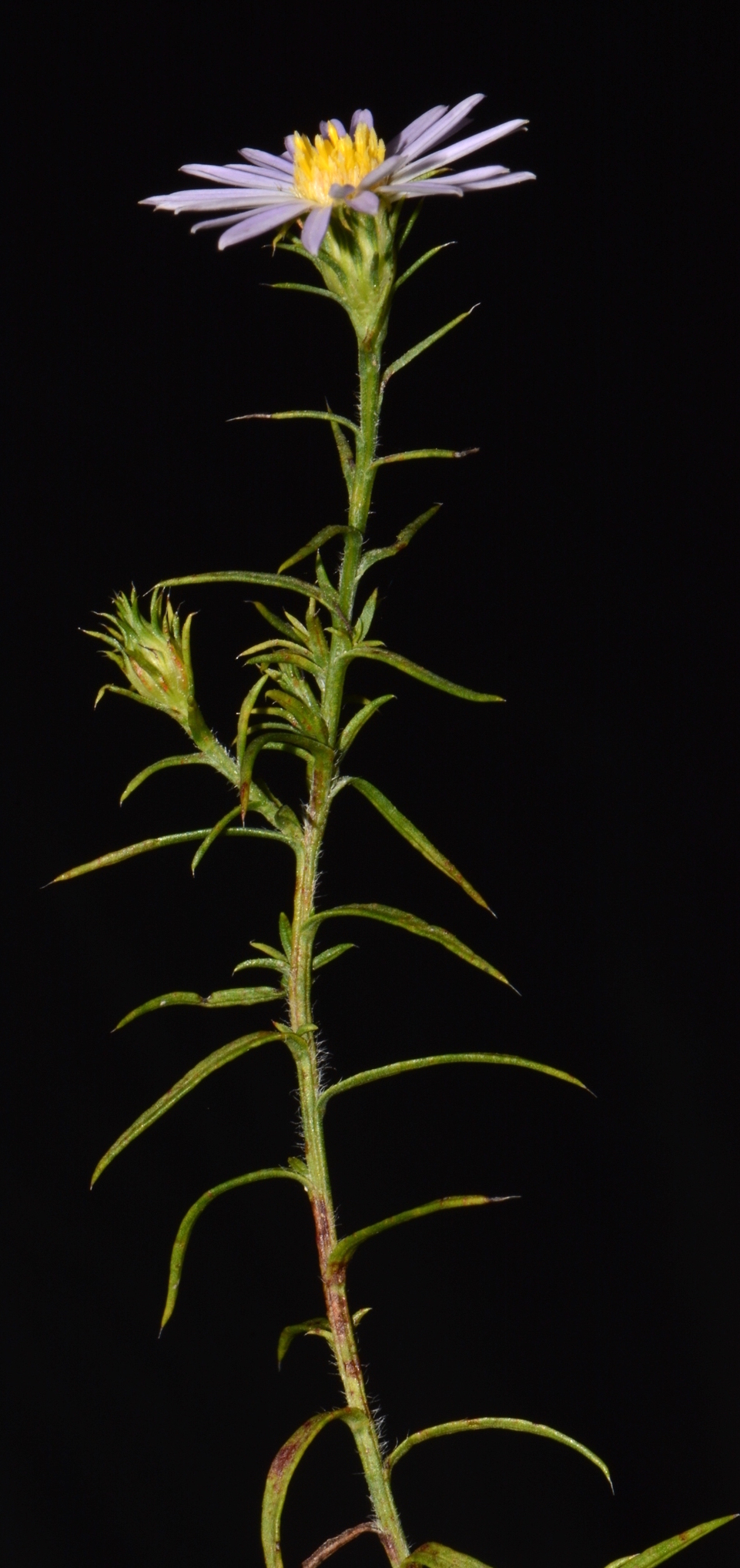
Part of a S. × priceae plant showing puberulent stem and two flower heads, one opened and with blue-violet ray florets

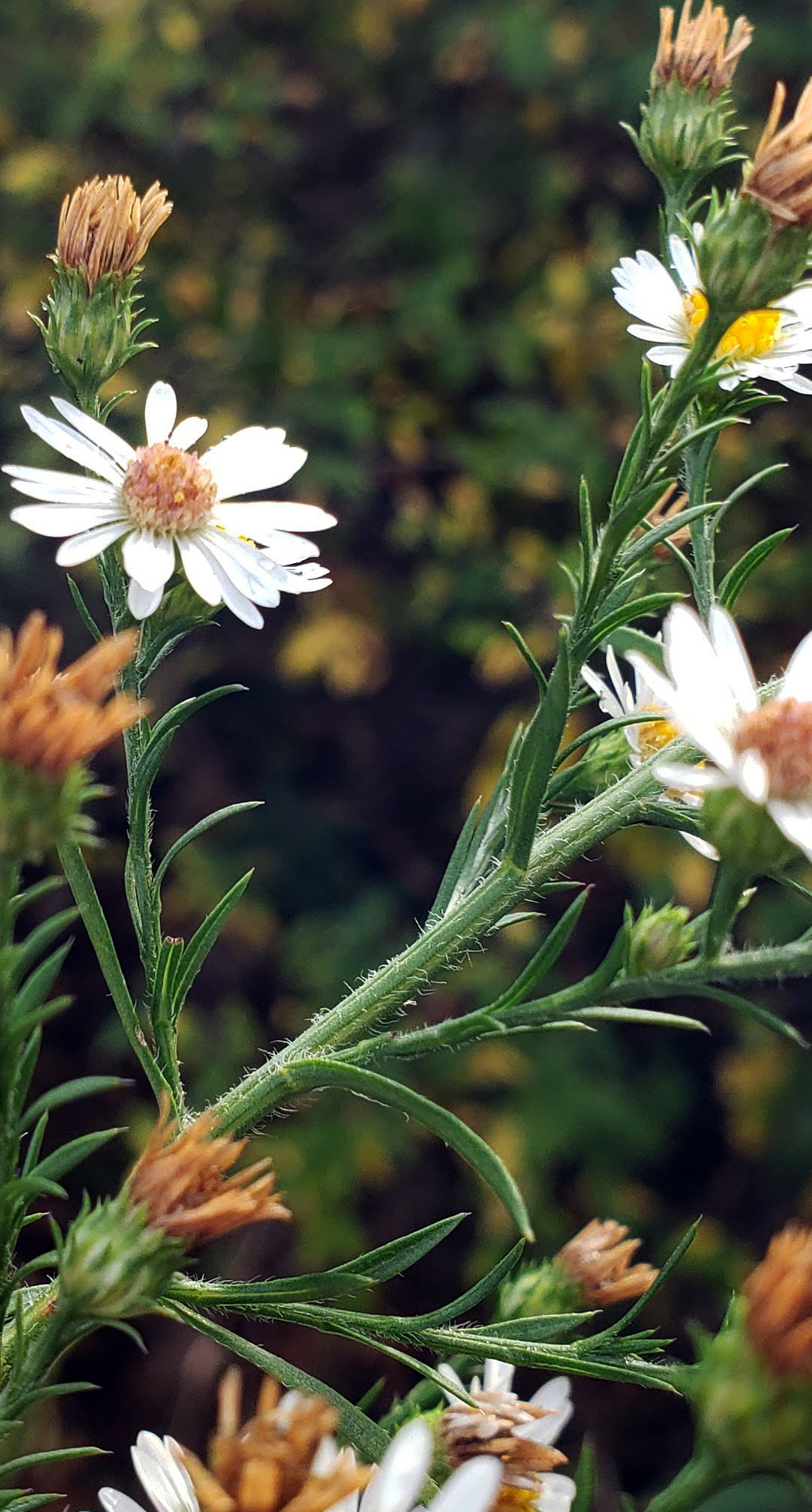
Part of an inflorescence of S. pilosum var. pilosum showing pubescent stems and several white flower heads

=== Etymology ===
The specific epithet (second part of the scientific name) kentuckiense is a Latinization of the name of the state of Kentucky where the holotype was found. The hybrid's specific epithet priceae is a Latinization of the surname of the collector, Sadie F. Price. The species has the common names of Kentucky aster, Price's aster, Miss Price's aster, Sadie's aster, and lavender oldfield aster. "Old field asters" is a common name for subsect. Porteriani.

== Distribution and habitat ==
Symphyotrichum kentuckiense is endemic to a limited range in the southeastern United States, specifically parts of Alabama, Georgia, Kentucky, and Tennessee. Hybrid S. × priceae has been documented only in Kentucky. S. kentuckiense grows in the Appalachian Mountain EPA Ecoregions Ridge and Valley (67) and Southwestern Appalachians (68), and in the Interior Plateau EPA Ecoregions of Interior Low Plateaus (71) and Interior River Valleys and Hills (72). It is adapted to and known from breaks or cracks in limestone cedar glades or limestone roadsides. It can be found at 200 to 400 meters (660 to 1,310 feet) in dry soil.

S. kentuckiense distribution map and habitat

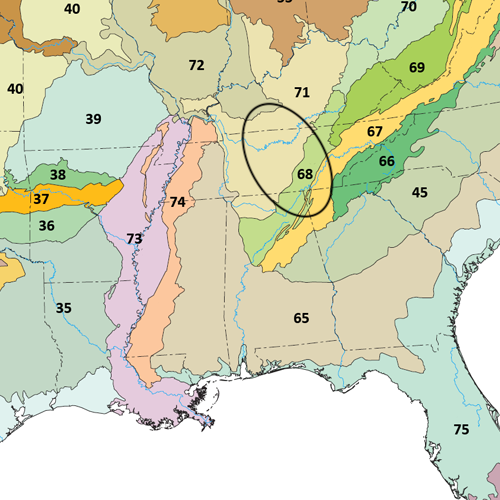
Endemic range is roughly within the black oval as shown on part of the U.S. EPA Level III ecoregions map.

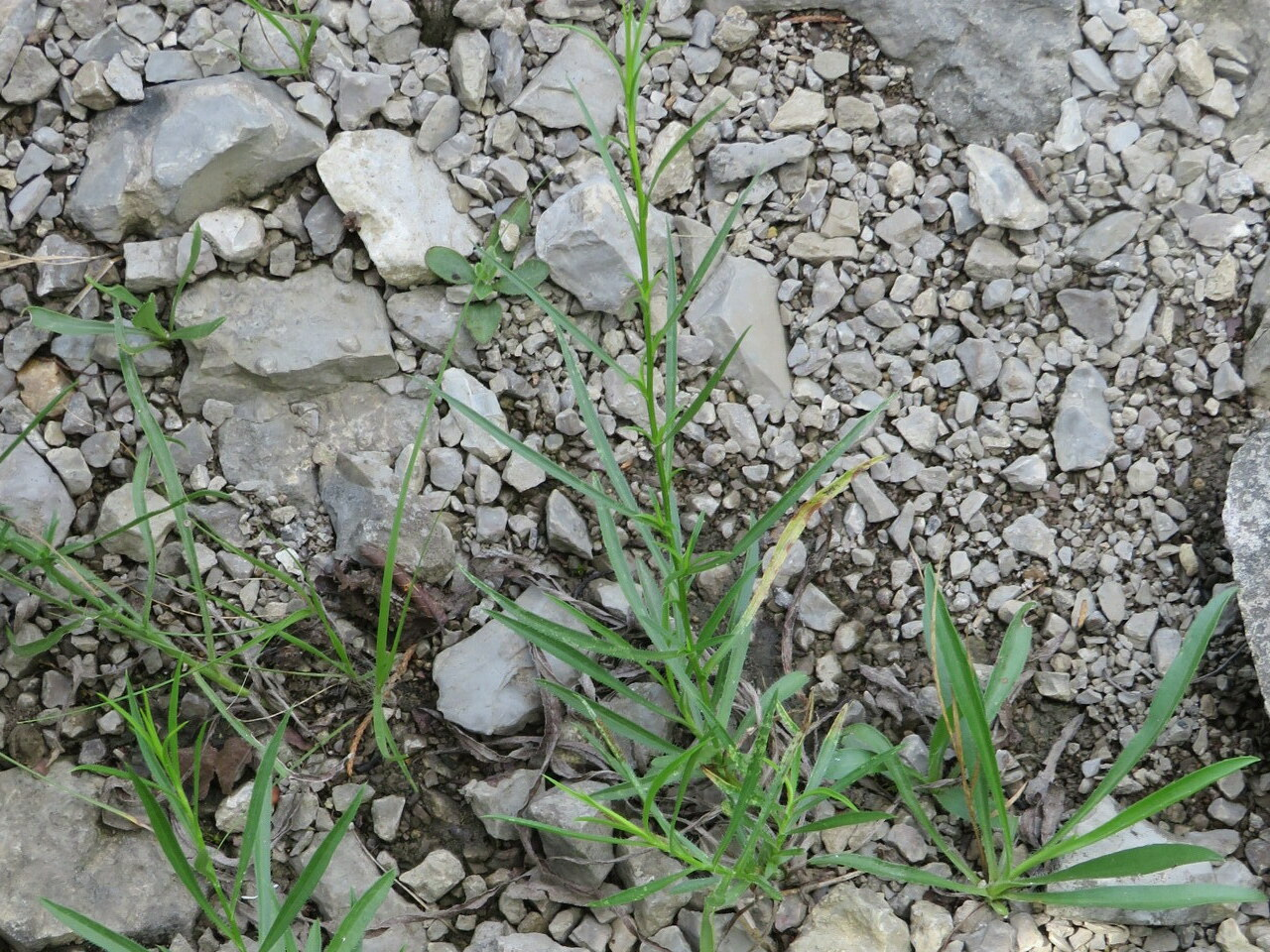
Several S. kentuckiense plants on a limestone cedar glade in Rutherford County, Tennessee, in August prior to blooming

S. kentuckiense is categorized on the United States National Wetland Plant List (NWPL) with the wetland indicator status rating of Facultative Upland (FACU) in the Eastern Mountains and Piedmont region (EMP). This rating means that it usually occurs in non-wetlands within its range, but can occasionally be found in wetlands.

== Ecology ==
Symphyotrichum kentuckiense has coefficients of conservatism (C-values) in the Floristic Quality Assessment (FQA) of 7 and 8 depending on evaluation region. The higher the C-value, the lower tolerance the species has for disturbance and the greater the likelihood that it is growing in a presettlement natural community. When it grows in the Appalachian Mountain EPA Ecoregions of 67 and 68, S. kentuckiense has a C-value of 7. In the Interior Plateau EPA Ecoregions of 71 and 72, its C-value is 8. Both of these C-values mean that its populations are found in high-quality remnant natural areas with little environmental degradation but can tolerate some periodic disturbance.

== Conservation ==
As of November 2026, NatureServe listed S. kentuckiense as Apparently Secure (G4) globally; Apparently Secure (S4) in Georgia; Imperiled (S2) in Kentucky; and, Critically Imperiled (S1) in North Carolina. (Note: Brouillet et al. in Flora of North America (FNA); botanist John C. Semple's Astereae Lab website; the Royal Botanic Gardens, Kew's Plants of the World Online (POWO) database; and, botanist Alan S. Weakley's Flora of the Southeastern United States (2022) report a presence of the species only in the states of Alabama, Georgia, Kentucky, and Tennessee.) The species' global status was last reviewed on 2 May 1988.
