= Sarah Frances Price =

American botanist, scientific illustrator and author (1849–1903)

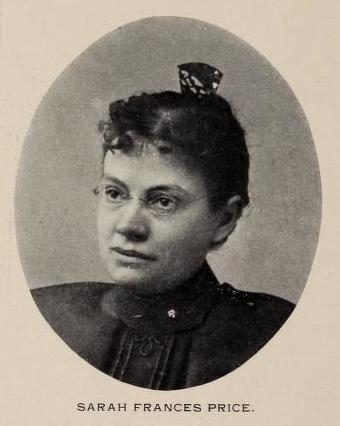
- Born: Sarah Frances Price; 1849; Evansville
- Died: July 3, 1903; Bowling Green
- Other name: Sadie
- Occupations: Scientific illustrator, botanist, writer, botanical collector, artist, scientific collector

Sarah Frances Price (1849 – July 3, 1903) was an American botanist and scientific illustrator. Price discovered many rare plants and is credited with classifying a large portion of Kentucky's flora. Also an artist, she drew about fifteen hundred southern plants in pencil and watercolor. The standard author abbreviation S.F.Price is used to indicate this person as the author when citing a botanical name.

== Biography ==
Price was born in 1849 in Evansville, Indiana, the third child of Alexander Price and Maria Price. Soon after Price was born, her family moved to Kentucky. With the onset of the American Civil War, the family moved to Indiana and taught at church-run schools, including the Episcopal Church school St. Agnes Hall. Her family were sympathizers to the Union during the Civil War. At the end of the Civil War, the Prices returned to Bowling Green, Kentucky. Shortly after their return, Price's parents and brother died.

Price was highly respected in the town for her talents and growing fame after she started her studies of the flora and fauna of Warren County, Kentucky. She had very advanced ideas for a woman during this time, which mostly pertained to woman's suffrage. Price got sick with a disease that had her bedridden, and began teaching painting and nature classes from there. After a while, she received treatment which greatly improved her mobility and was able to begin teaching elsewhere. She was offered a position as a curator for the Joliet High School Museum before she passed. Price died of dysentery on July 3, 1903, when she was 54 years old. Her sister, Mary Price, sold her herbarium to the Missouri Botanical Garden in St. Louis, Missouri in 1904 with approximately 3,000 sheets and 1,000 sketches.

== Education ==
Sarah Price attended and graduated from St. Agnes Hall, a church run school by the Episcopal Church in Evansville, Indiana. Later, she began giving lectures on plants, birds, insects, and other nature subjects at various locations within this area.

== Scientific career ==
Price started her scientific career by going on trips to the Mammoth Cave area. There she discovered the Trichomanes radicans, or filmy fern. Ferns were Prices' main focus, but she is also credited with observing and documenting birds, insects, and shells. To document, Price used water color paintings and drawing to capture an image of the many different species. She drew more than 150 birds, ranging from hummingbirds to egrets, bird eggs, which included owl, hawk, oriole, and thrush eggs, as well as many different butterflies, moths, ferns, and other plants. Of the insect publications, Price included the life cycle of them.

Price submitted her bird and plant drawings to the Chicago World Fair in 1893, winning first prize for finest herbarium exhibit. During her scientific field trips, Price would always be found in full-length skirt, which came with many challenges as she traveled through the hills, forests, and fields of Warren County, Kentucky. Price gained a lot of publicity after her discoveries became common knowledge to many scientists. Her name started to appear in many different publications, from the Who's Who in America to the Preliminary Checklist of the Vertebrate Animals of Kentucky. Price was able to get her portrait and quotes about the flora that were represented in these publications.

== Publications ==
Price was able to publish a number of books, leaflets, and articles during her studies. Her first book was titled Songs From the Southland, and was published in 1890. In 1892, Price published Shakespeare's Twilights. Her most well known publication came in 1897, which was The Fern Collectors Handbook and Herbarium. This book had illustrations of each fern Price came across. It also included a blank page to press the plant that matches the drawing. In the same year, The Trees and Shrubs of Kentucky, another book written and illustrated by Price, was published. This book included multiple drawings of ferns and trees of the eastern United States.

Price also published a leaflet titled: Flora of Warren County Kentucky. Price had many articles published and comments made about different species of birds in newspapers and magazines. These included: "A Rare Fern, Asplenium Bradley" in the March 1, 1893 issue of Garden and Forest, "Queer Misfortunes of Bird" in the American Naturalist in 1895, and a comment about being "familiar with the songs of most of the local species" in the Bowling Green Courier on May 31, 1896. After Prices' death in 1903, her sister Mary submitted many of her sketches of birds to different magazines and organizations as well. These included: "Bird Sketches from Southern Kentucky," and "Kentucky Birds" in the American Ornithology in 1904, and had many of Sadie's sketches sent to the Library of the Missouri Botanical Garden in St. Louis Missouri. These sketches can still be found at the library as well as many more of her drawings of eggs, insects, and plants.

== Legacy ==
Price left a lasting legacy in the students she taught over the years. The students started the Sadie Price Nature Club in 1903. They met once a week and went on many class field trips, which usually included an open wagon. After her death, the class continued to meet regularly. There were many students in the class put none of them had the opportunity of publishing any of their contributions to their studies. The class was very active for 15 years and continued to meet on occasion for years afterwards.

Sarah's many watercolor drawings and paintings can be seen at the Missouri Botanical Garden in St. Louis, Missouri. Her sister, Mary, sold part of the collection to Dr. William Trelease. The rest of the artifacts were eventually given to the garden in 1908.

After her death, five species of plants were named after Price. These include Cornus Priceana, Apios priceana, Oxalis priceae, Viola priceana, and Aster kentuckiensis.
