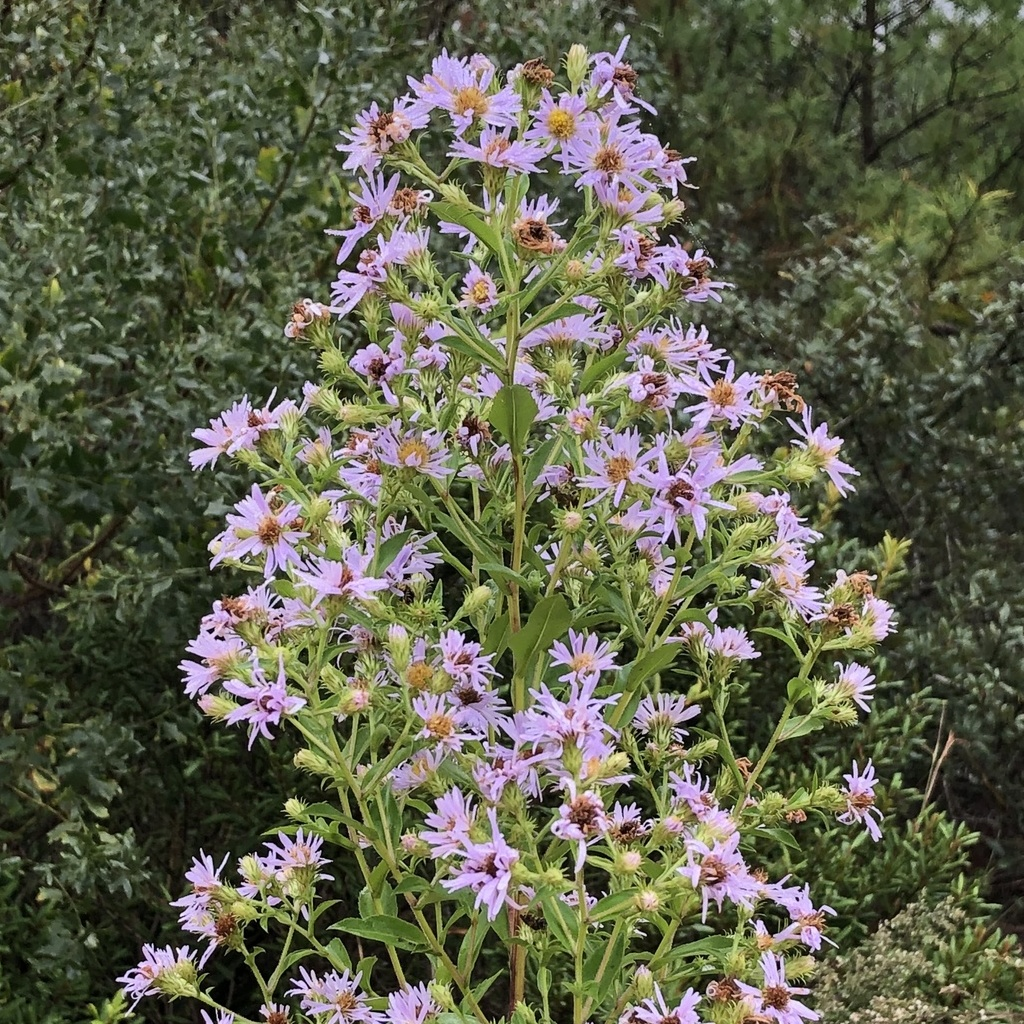

Conservation status
- Apparently Secure (NatureServe)

Scientific classification
- Kingdom: Plantae
- Clade: Tracheophytes
- Clade: Angiosperms
- Clade: Eudicots
- Clade: Asterids
- Order: Asterales
- Family: Asteraceae
- Tribe: Astereae
- Subtribe: Symphyotrichinae
- Genus: Symphyotrichum
- Subgenus: Symphyotrichum subg. Symphyotrichum
- Section: Symphyotrichum sect. Symphyotrichum
- Species: S. elliottii

Binomial name
- Symphyotrichum elliottii (Torr. & A.Gray) G.L.Nesom
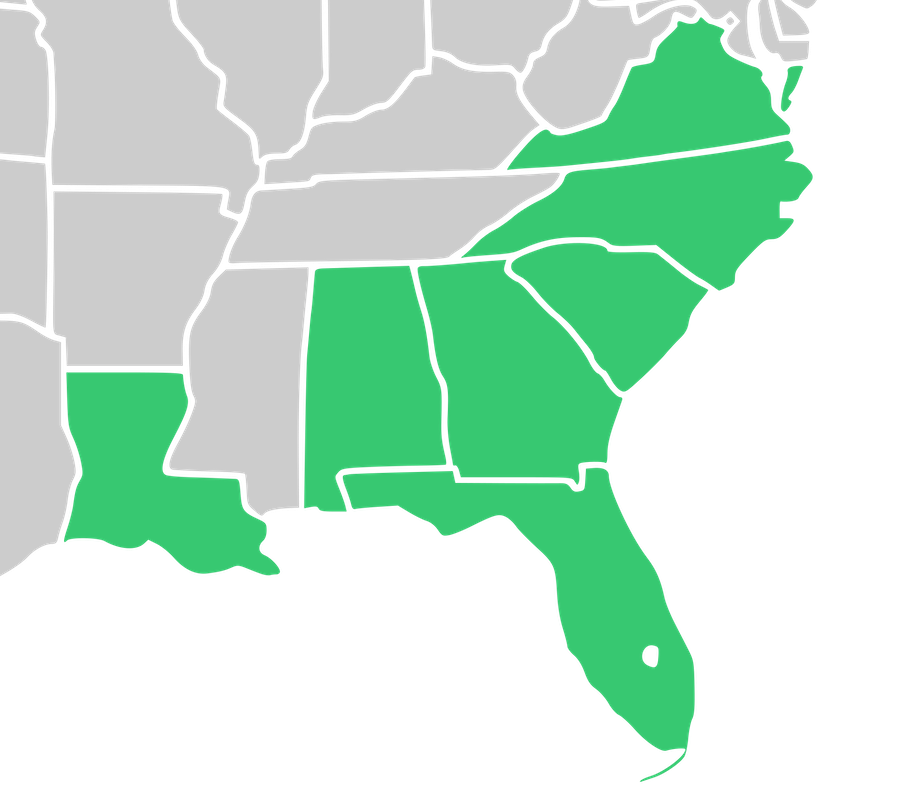
- Native distribution by state

Synonyms
- Aster elliottii Torr. & A.Gray; Aster puniceus subsp. elliottii (Torr. & A.Gray) A.G.Jones; Aster puniceus var. elliottii (Torr. & A.Gray) A.G.Jones

= Symphyotrichum elliottii =

Species of flowering plant in the aster family

Symphyotrichum elliottii (formerly Aster elliottii) is a species of flowering plant in the family Asteraceae native to the southeastern United States Atlantic coastal plain where it grows in wetland areas. Commonly known as Elliott's aster, it is a perennial, herbaceous plant that may reach 6 to 20 decimeters (2 to 6 1/2 feet) tall. Its flowers have pink (sometimes lavender) ray florets and pale yellow, then pink, then brown disk florets. NatureServe, as of July 2021, classified S. elliottii as Apparently Secure (G4) globally, and of conservation concern in North Carolina, South Carolina, and Virginia.

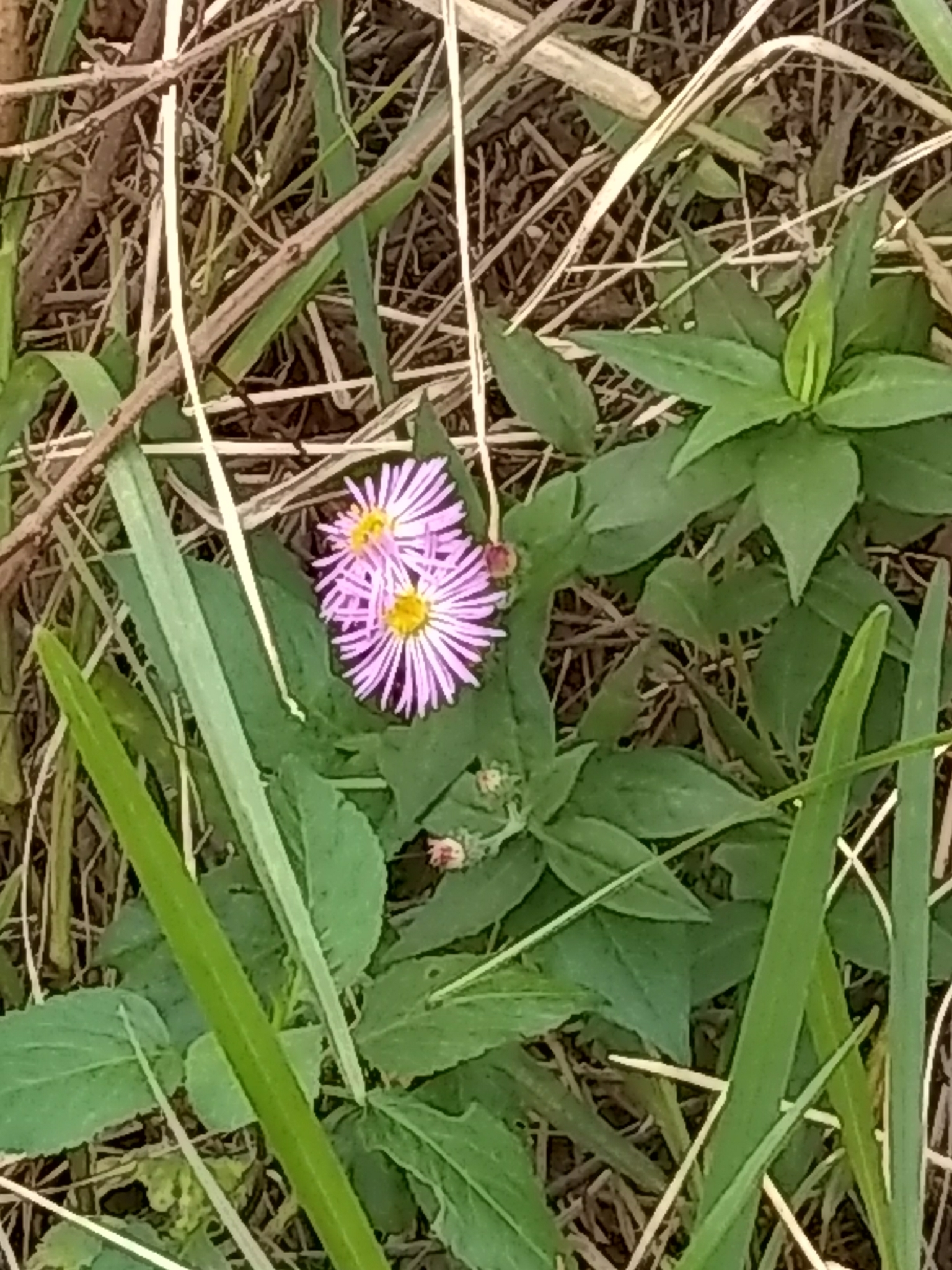
Symphyotrichum elliottii
