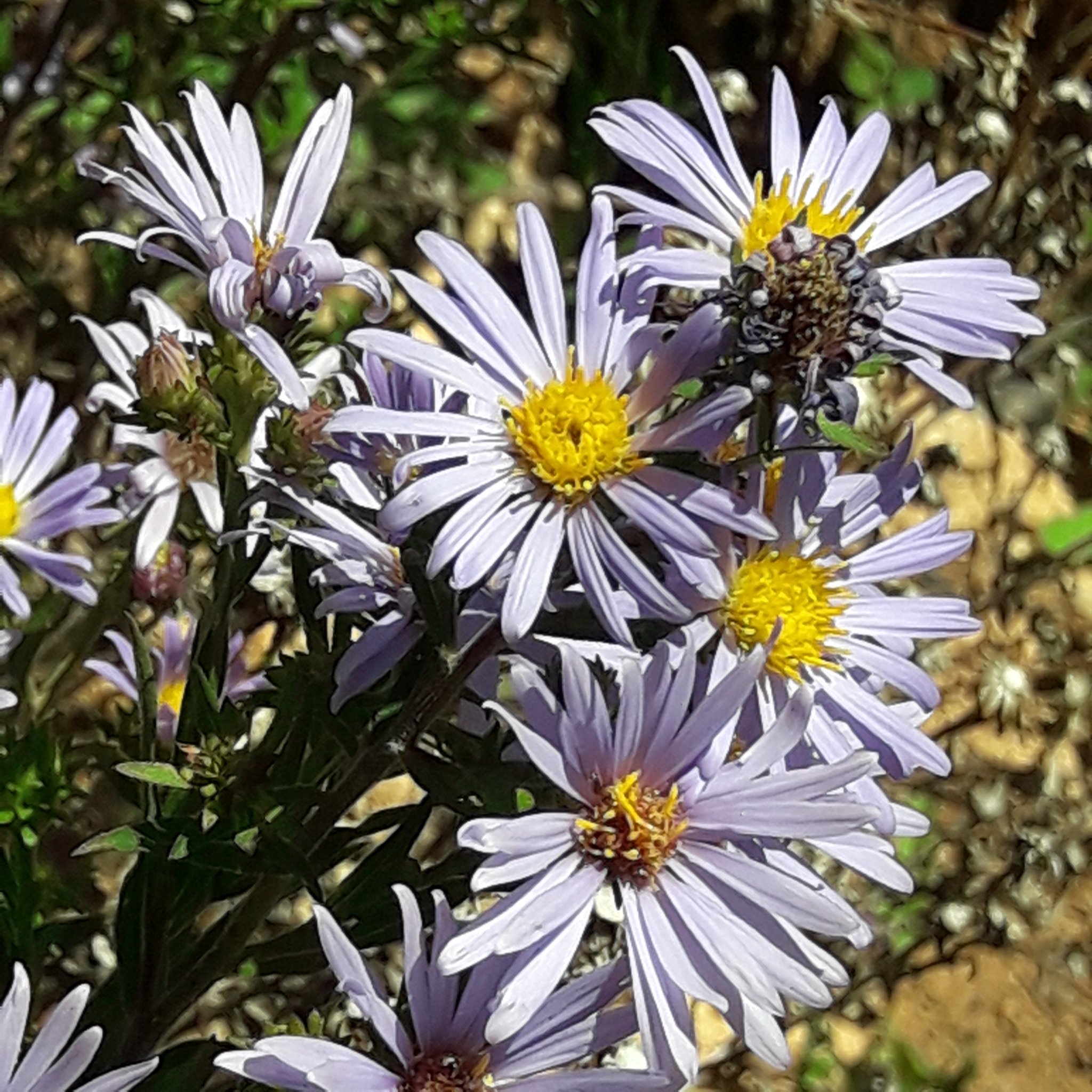

Scientific classification
- Kingdom: Plantae
- Clade: Tracheophytes
- Clade: Angiosperms
- Clade: Eudicots
- Clade: Asterids
- Order: Asterales
- Family: Asteraceae
- Tribe: Astereae
- Subtribe: Symphyotrichinae
- Genus: Symphyotrichum
- Subgenus: Symphyotrichum subg. Symphyotrichum
- Section: Symphyotrichum sect. Symphyotrichum
- Species: S. carnerosanum

Binomial name
- Symphyotrichum carnerosanum (S.Watson) G.L.Nesom
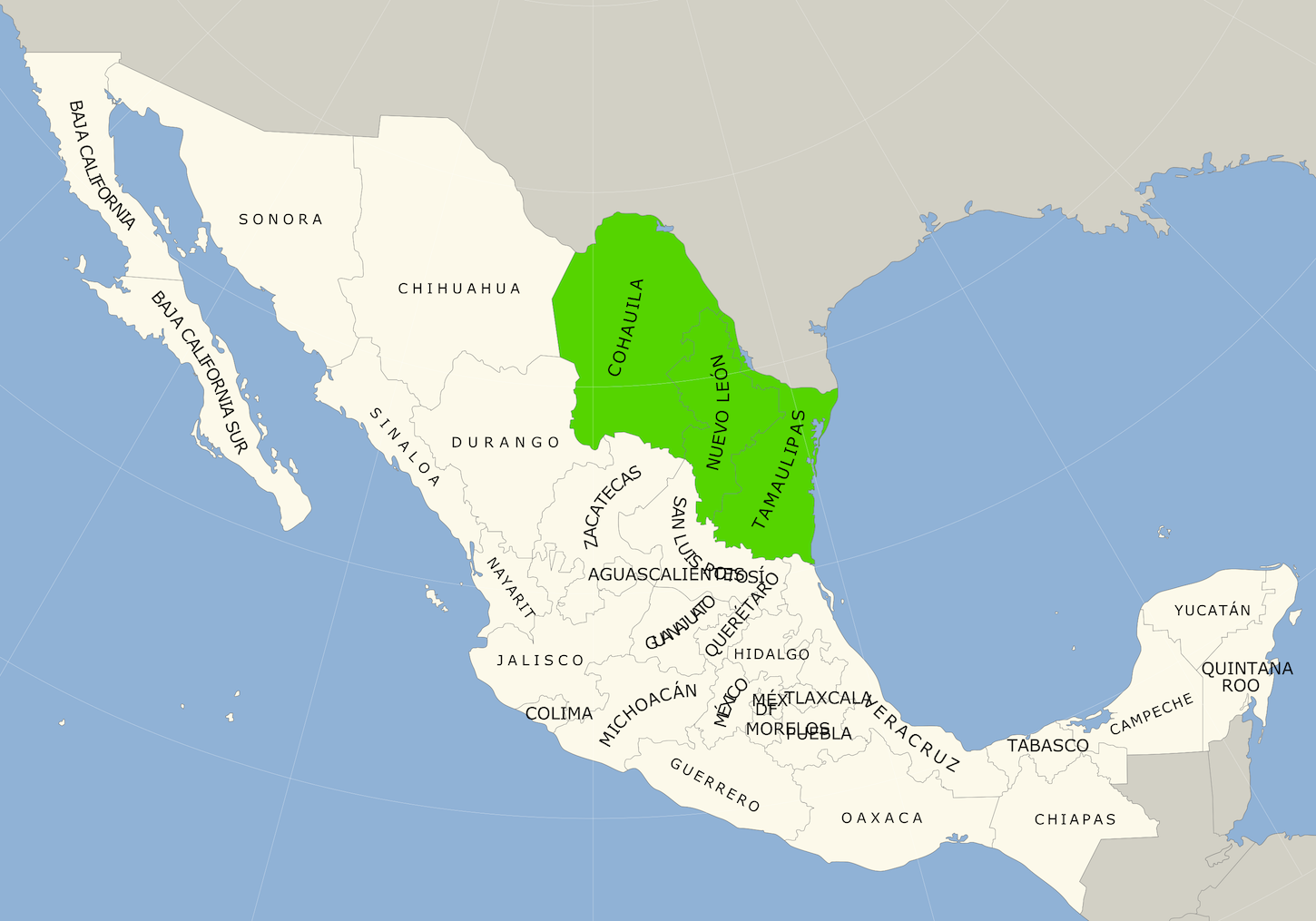
- S. carnerosanum distribution

Synonyms
- Aster carnerosanus S.Watson

= Symphyotrichum carnerosanum =

Species of plant in the aster family

Symphyotrichum carnerosanum (formerly Aster carnerosanus) is a species of flowering plant in the family Asteraceae endemic to the Mexican states of Coahuila, Nuevo León, and Tamaulipas.
