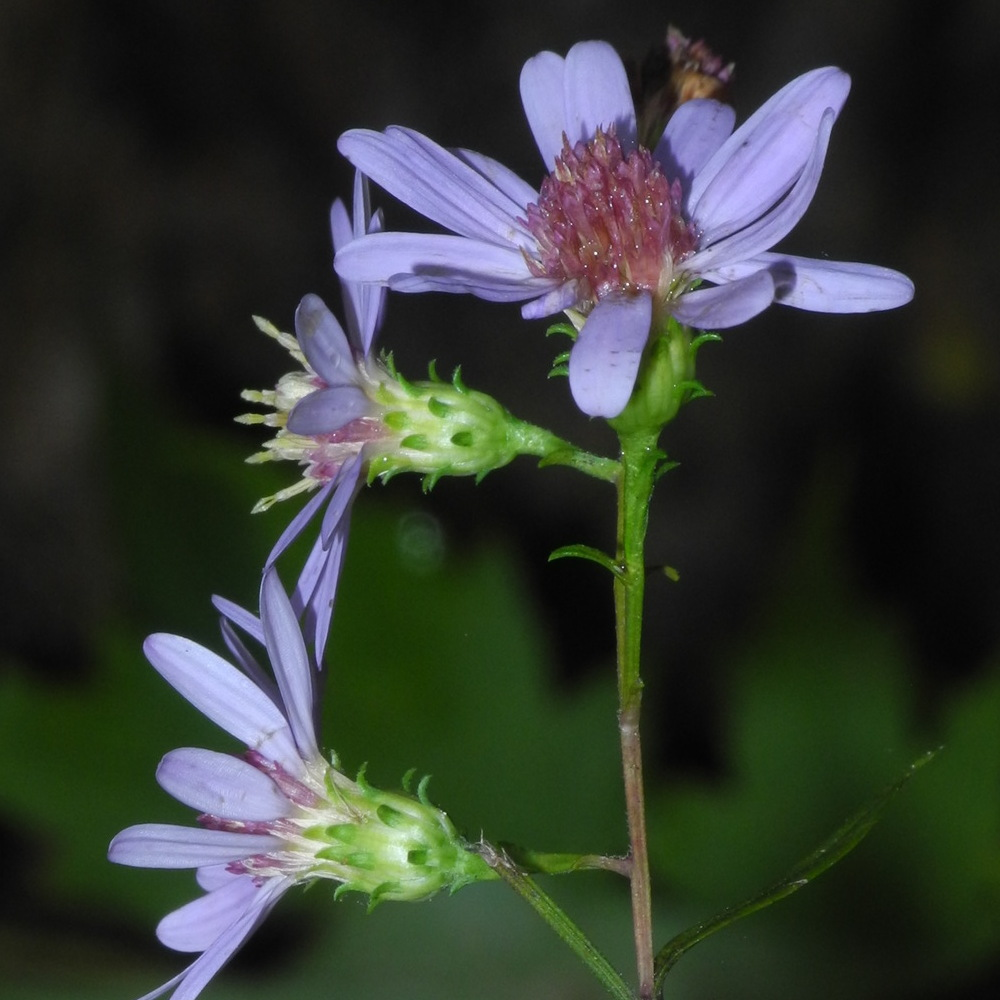
- S. retroflexum, Macon County, North Carolina

Conservation status
- Apparently Secure (NatureServe) (Note: As of September 2021, NatureServe's latest global status review for this species was dated 25 November 1994 with a notation that "Global status needs review.")

Scientific classification
- Kingdom: Plantae
- Clade: Tracheophytes
- Clade: Angiosperms
- Clade: Eudicots
- Clade: Asterids
- Order: Asterales
- Family: Asteraceae
- Tribe: Astereae
- Subtribe: Symphyotrichinae
- Genus: Symphyotrichum
- Subgenus: Symphyotrichum subg. Symphyotrichum
- Section: Symphyotrichum sect. Symphyotrichum
- Species: S. retroflexum

Binomial name
- Symphyotrichum retroflexum (Lindl.) G.L.Nesom
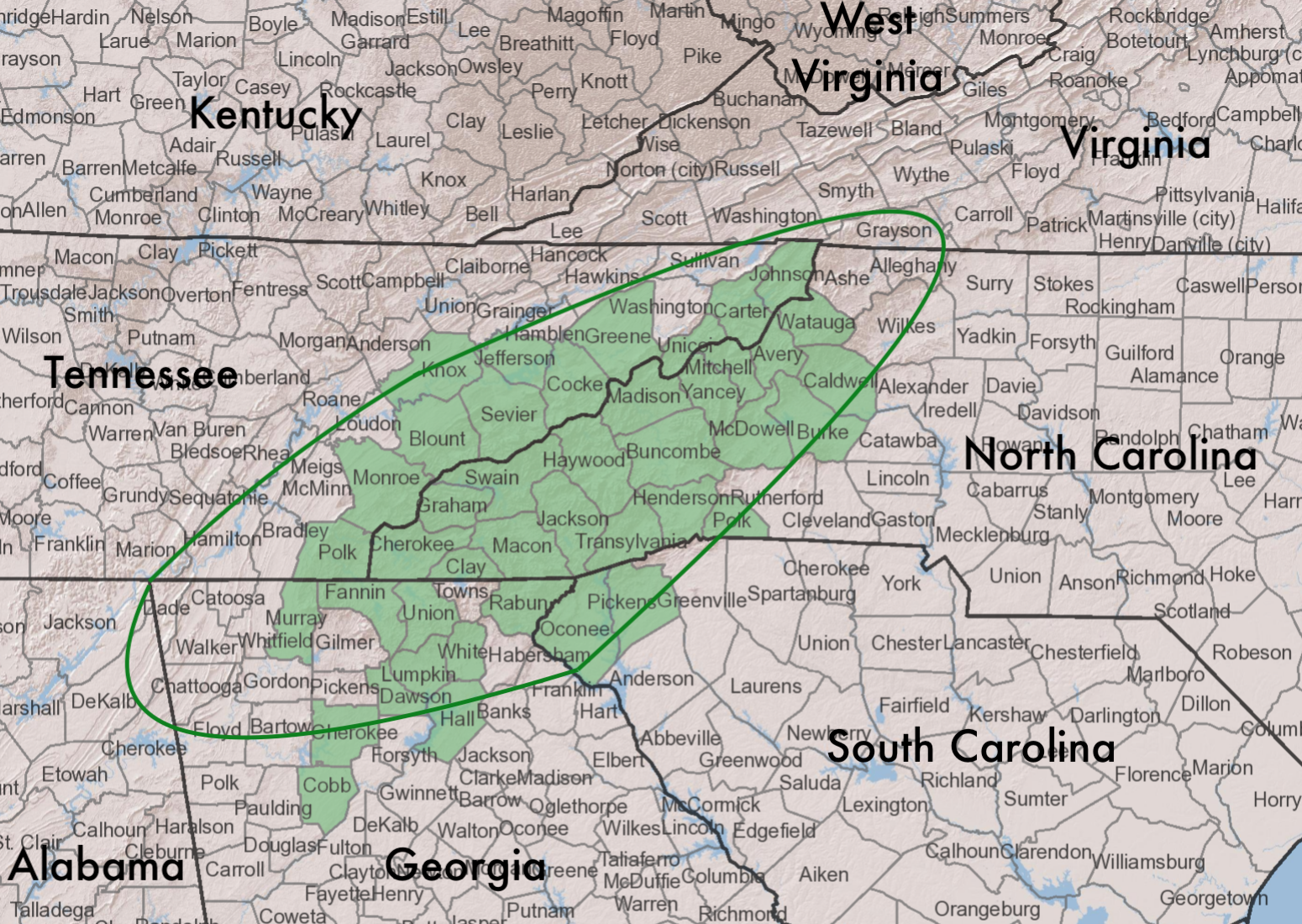
- Native distribution

Synonyms
- Aster curtisii Torr. & A.Gray; Aster retroflexus Lindl.

= Symphyotrichum retroflexum =

Species of flowering plant in the daisy family

Symphyotrichum retroflexum (formerly Aster retroflexus) is a species of flowering plant in the family Asteraceae native to the southeastern United States. Commonly known as rigid whitetop aster, it is a perennial, herbaceous plant that may reach 40 to 100 centimeters (16 to 39 inches) tall. Its flowers have blue to purple ray florets and cream to pale yellow then pinkish disk florets. It is known only from the Blue Ridge Mountains in Alabama, Georgia, North Carolina, South Carolina, Tennessee, and Virginia, where it grows in wooded areas at elevations of 400–1,500 meters (1,300–4,900 feet). As of September 2021, NatureServe classified it as Apparently Secure (G4); it had been reviewed last in 1994 and is marked as "needs review". There is an introduced presence of S. retroflexum in southeast China.

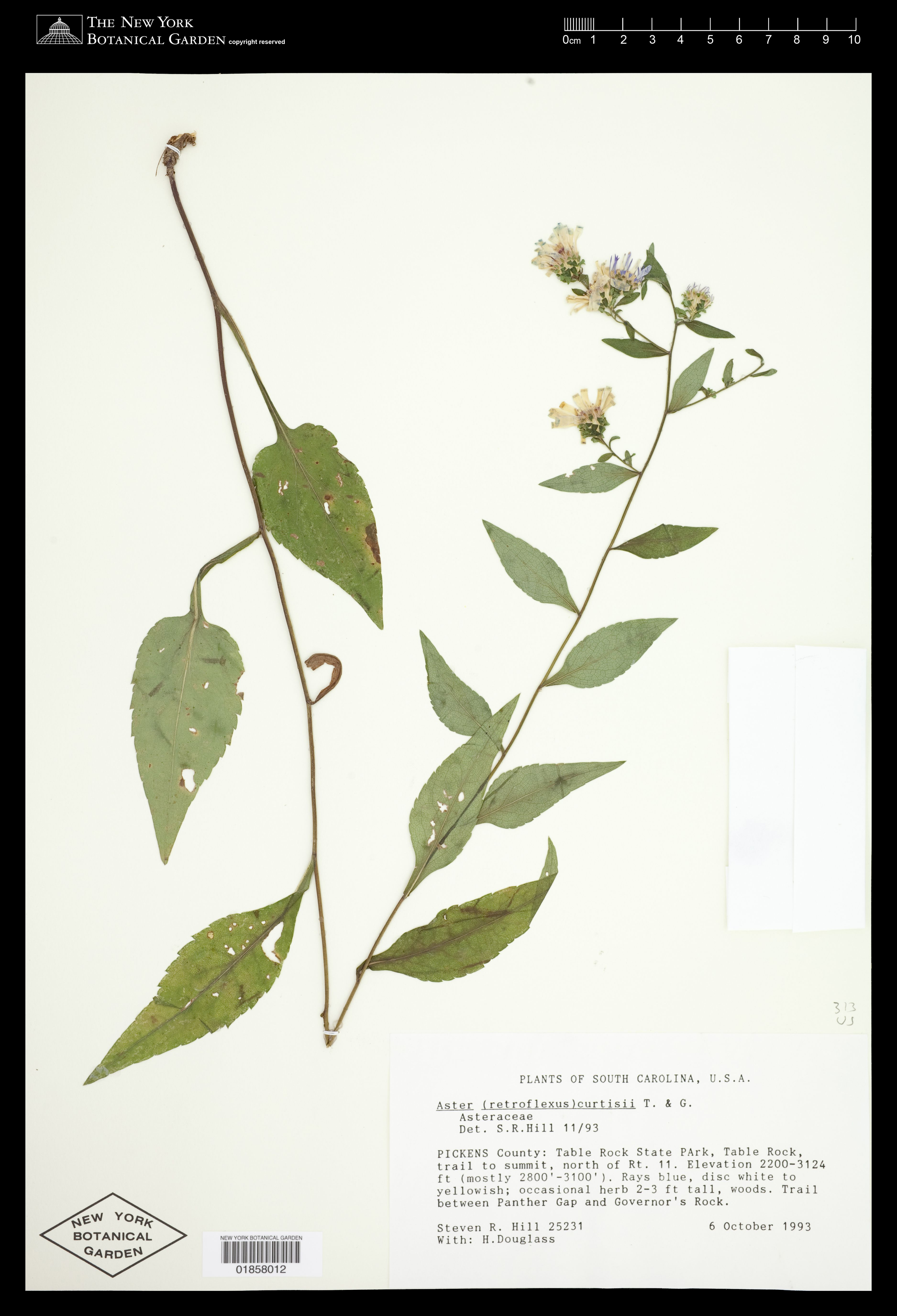
S. retroflexum herbarium specimen
