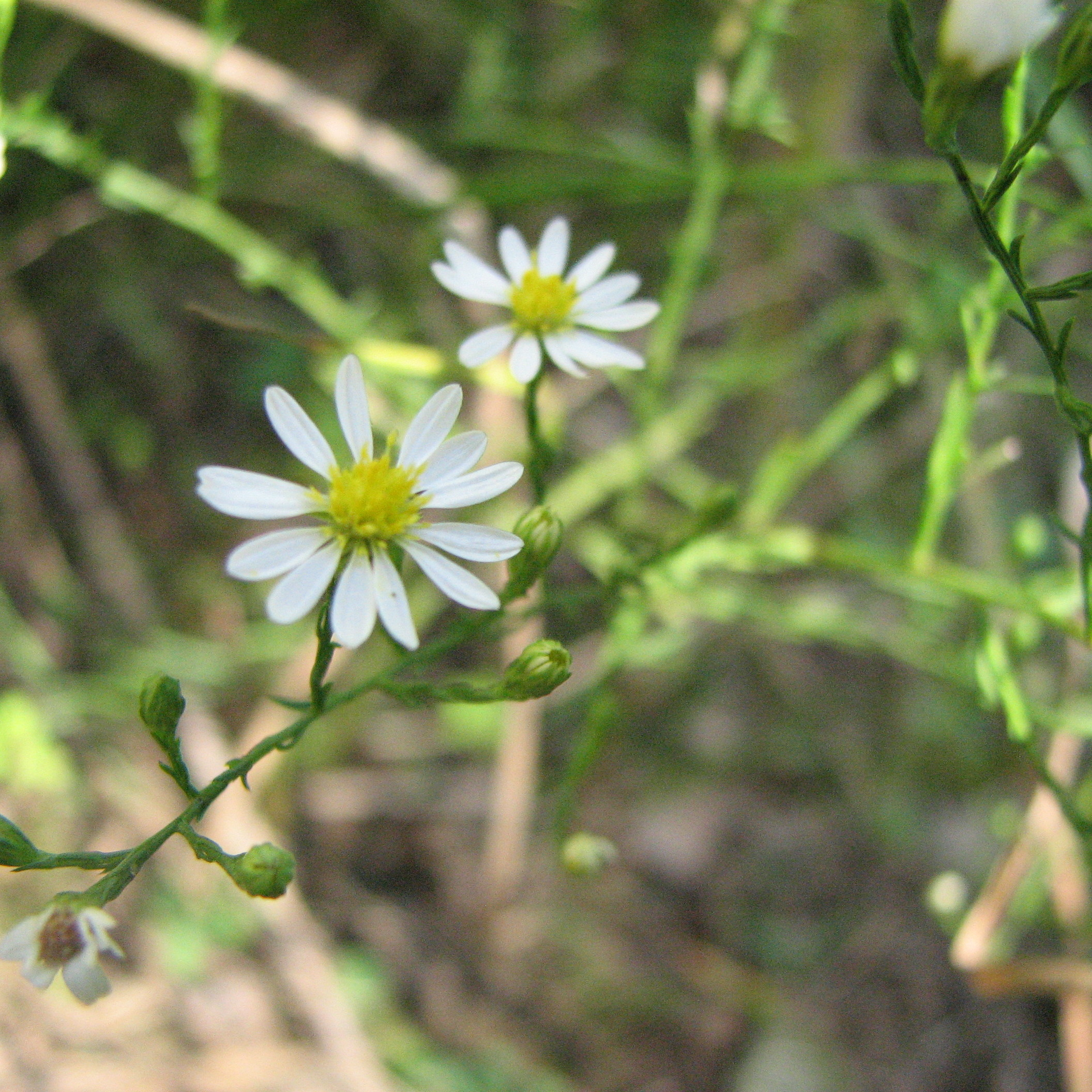
- S. depauperatum from the serpentine grassland demonstration area in Nottingham, Pennsylvania

Conservation status
- Imperiled (NatureServe)

Scientific classification
- Kingdom: Plantae
- Clade: Tracheophytes
- Clade: Angiosperms
- Clade: Eudicots
- Clade: Asterids
- Order: Asterales
- Family: Asteraceae
- Genus: Symphyotrichum
- Section: Symphyotrichum sect. Symphyotrichum
- Species: S. depauperatum

Binomial name
- Symphyotrichum depauperatum (Fernald) G.L.Nesom
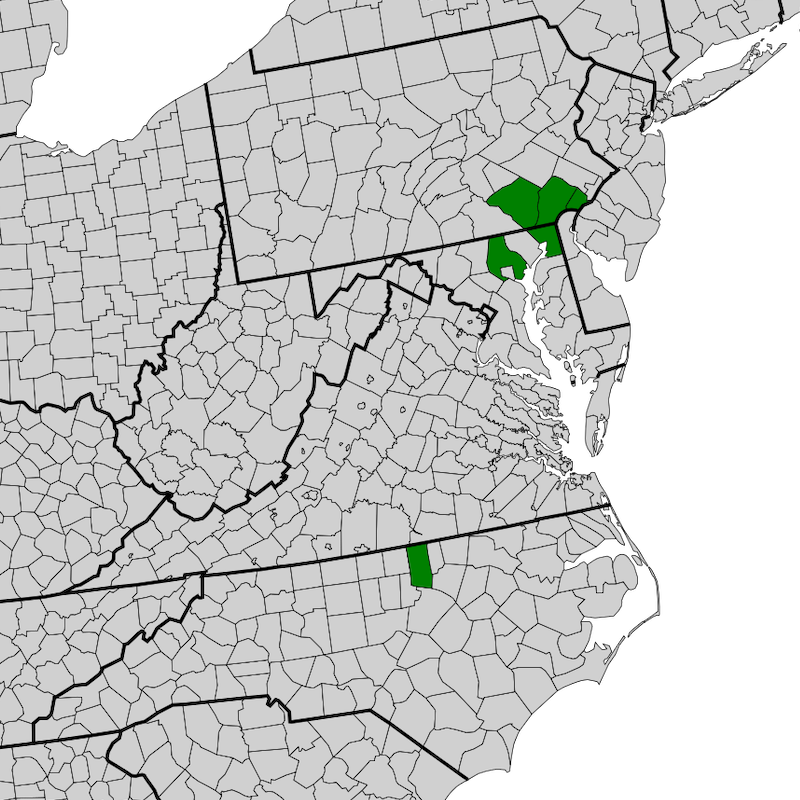
- Endemic distribution

Synonyms
- Basionym: Aster depauperatus Fernald; Alphabetical list: Aster ericoides var. depauperatus Porter; Aster ericoides var. pusillus A.Gray; Aster parviceps var. pusillus Fernald; Aster pilosus var. pusillus (A.Gray) A.G.Jones

= Symphyotrichum depauperatum =

Species of plant in the aster family

Symphyotrichum depauperatum (formerly Aster depauperatus), commonly known as serpentine aster or starved aster, is a rare species in the family Asteraceae adapted to serpentine barrens, an ecosystem with a high concentration of toxic metals in the soil. It has been found in Pennsylvania, Maryland, and on some diabase glades in North Carolina. It grows to 50 centimeters (1 3/4 feet) and has white ray florets surrounding a center of yellow disk florets.

== Description ==
Symphyotrichum depauperatum is a perennial, herbaceous plant that may reach up to 50 centimeters (1 3/4 feet) tall, with 1–3 stems. The leaves are narrow and generally 2–4 centimeters (3/4–1 1/2 inches) long. The plant produces numerous flower heads in branched arrays, each head with 7–14 white or, rarely, pink ray florets surrounding 7–17 yellow disk florets.

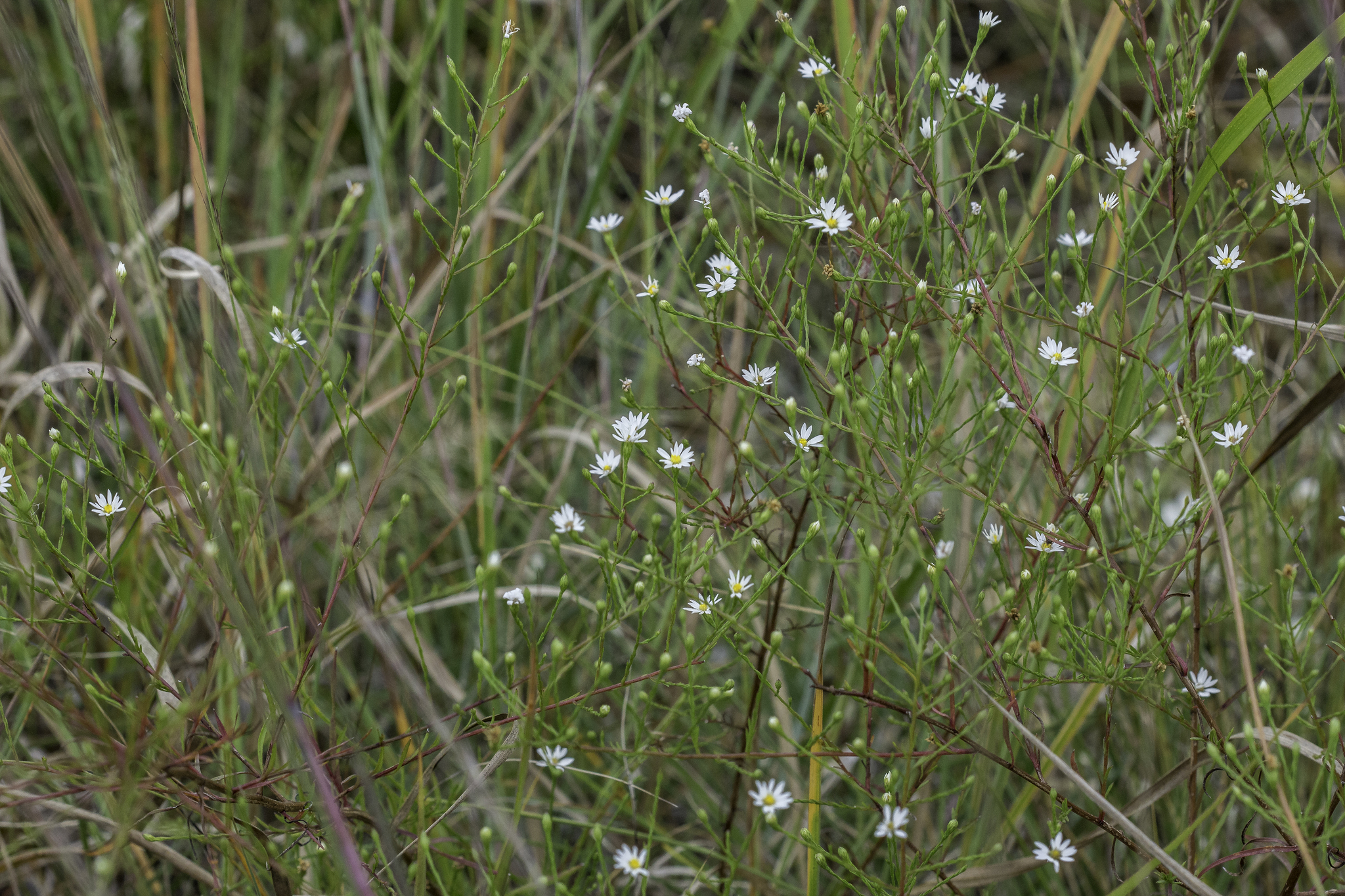
A plant in flower

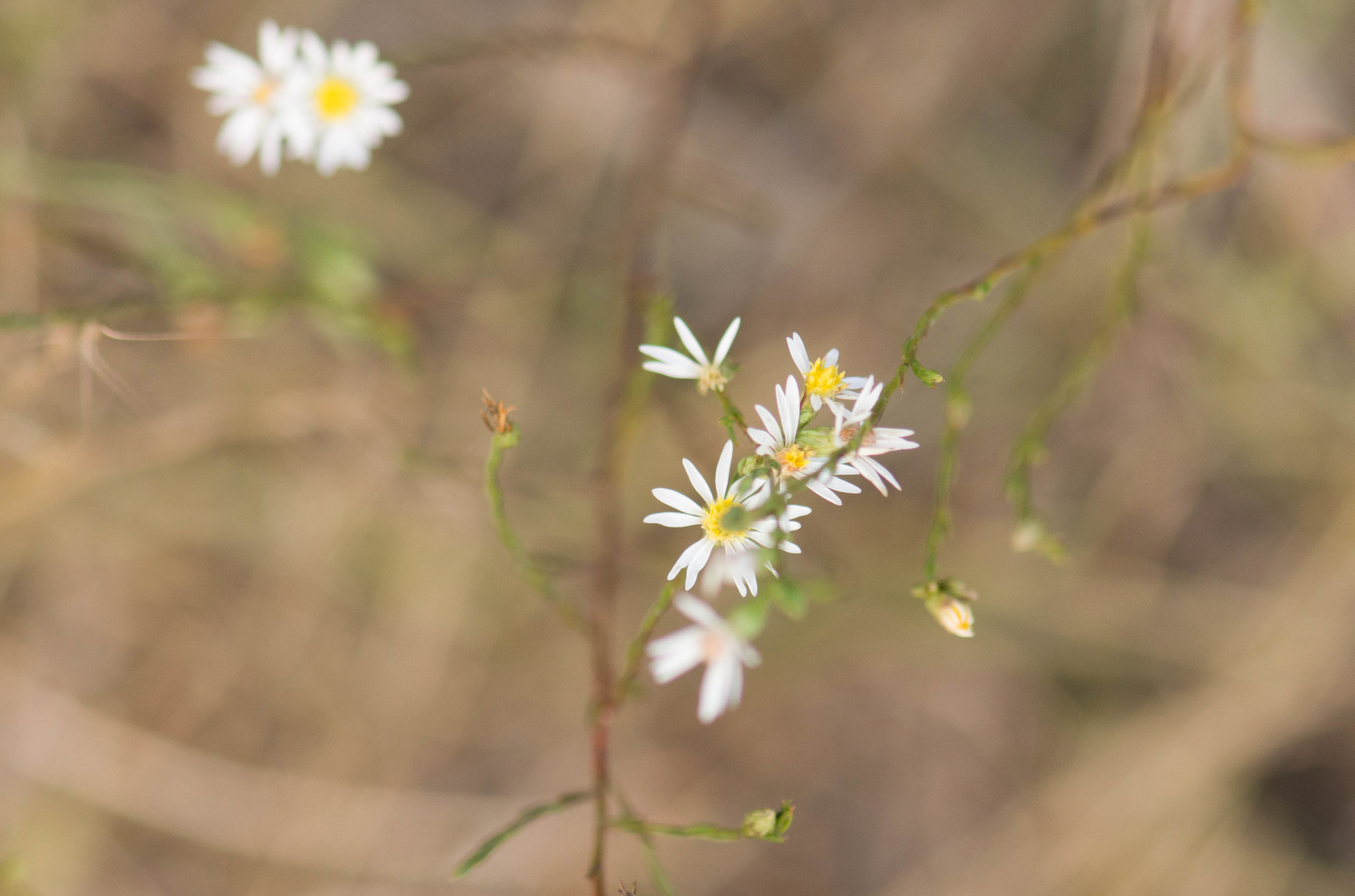
Flowers

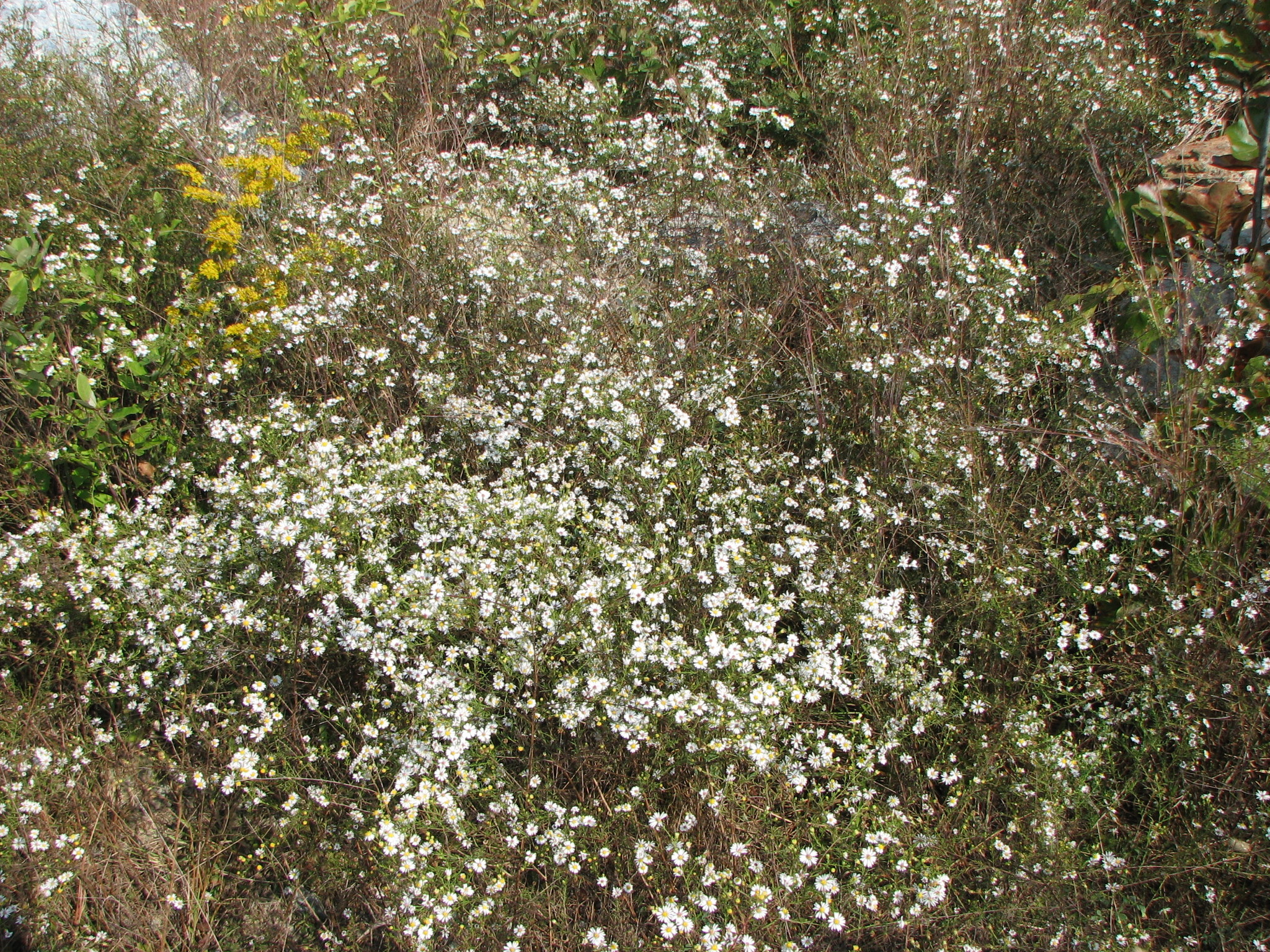
Growth habit

== Taxonomy ==
Within the genus Symphyotrichum, S. depauperatum has been classified in subgenus Symphyotrichum section Symphyotrichum subsection Porteriani. Its full name with author citation is Symphyotrichum depauperatum (Fernald) G.L.Nesom. It was first described by American botanist Merritt Lyndon Fernald in 1908 as Aster depauperatus.

== Distribution and habitat ==
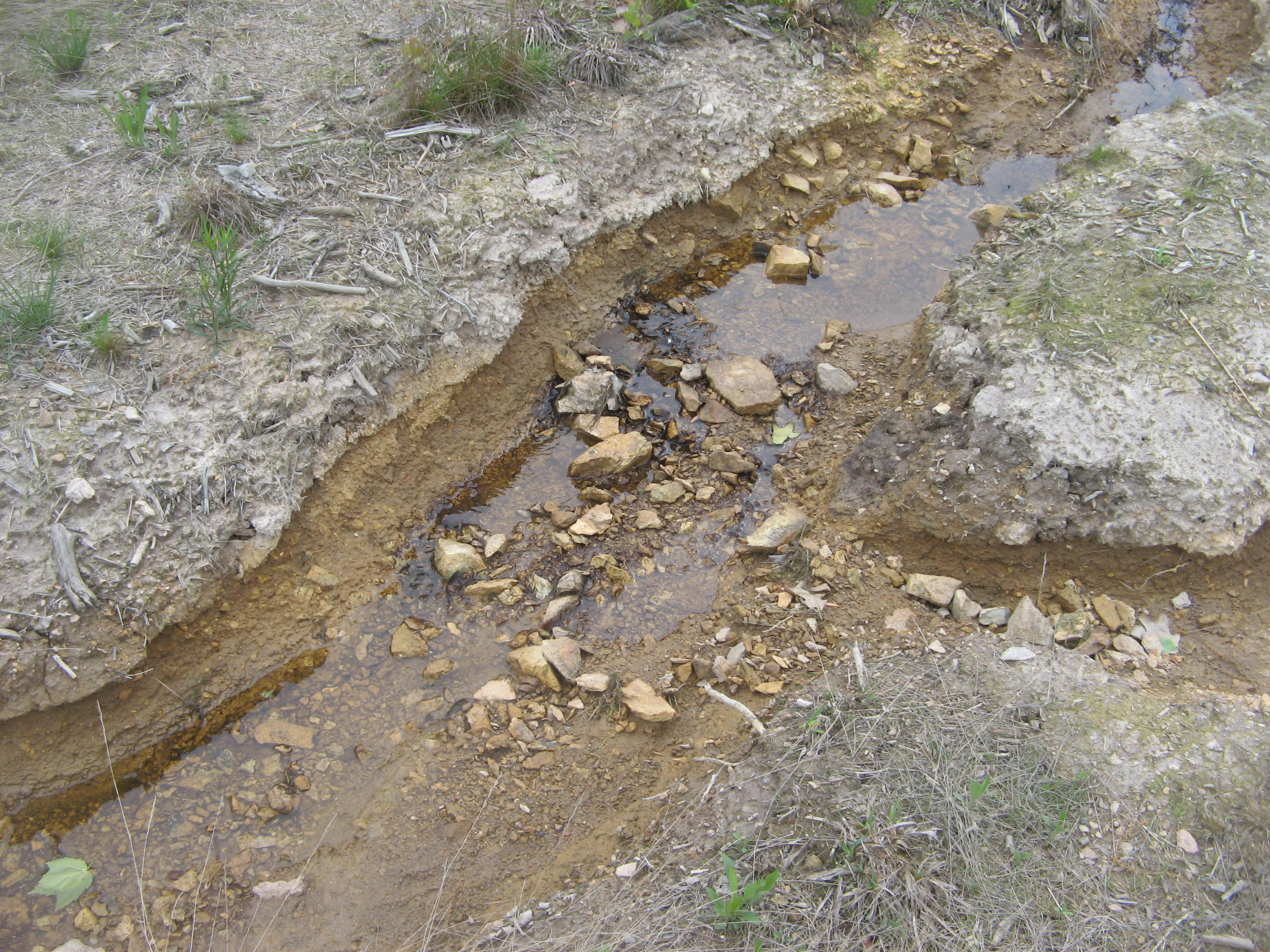
A stream in a serpentine barren in Lancaster County, Pennsylvania

S. depauperatum is adapted to serpentine barrens, an ecosystem with a high concentration of toxic metals in the soil. It has been found in Baltimore and Cecil Counties, Maryland; Granville County, North Carolina; and, Chester, Delaware, and Lancaster Counties, Pennsylvania.

Serpentine aster has been called a "flagship species" of the unique serpentine ecosystem and was once thought to be endemic to these barrens, but it also has been found to occur in a disjoint population on diabase glades in Granville County, North Carolina.

== Conservation ==
Symphyotrichum depauperatum is classified by the state of Pennsylvania as a threatened species because its range is restricted to a few limited areas, and the majority of its populations occur on sites threatened by quarrying, housing development, and industrial development.

As of August 2022, NatureServe listed it as Globally Imperiled (G2); Critically Imperiled (S1) in Maryland and North Carolina; and, Imperiled (S2) in Pennsylvania. NatureServe's most recent review of S. depauperatum's global status was 3 October 1997.
