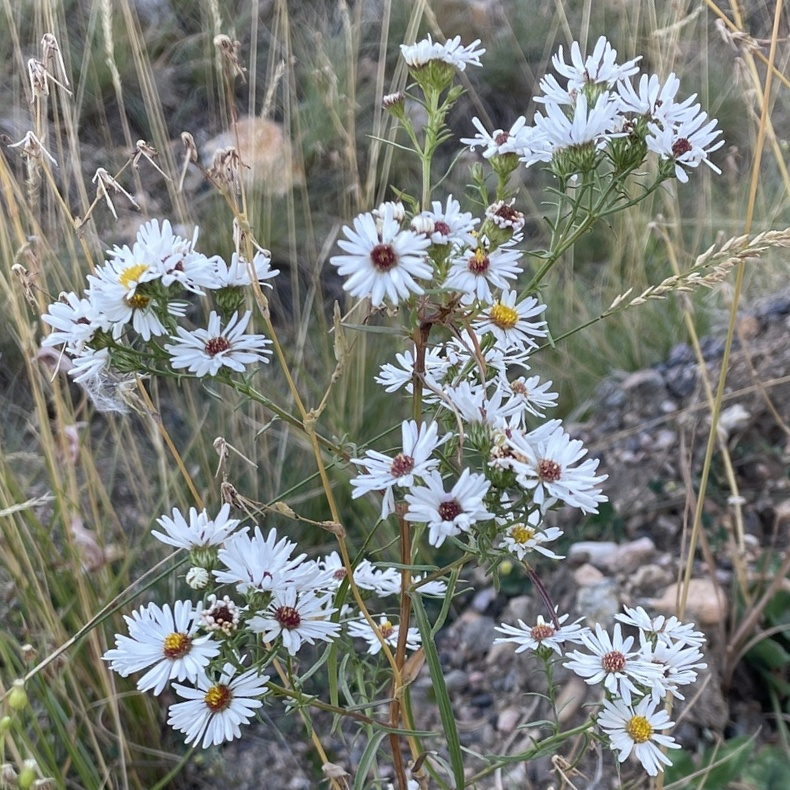
- S. porteri, Larimer County, Colorado

Conservation status
- Vulnerable (NatureServe)

Scientific classification
- Kingdom: Plantae
- Clade: Tracheophytes
- Clade: Angiosperms
- Clade: Eudicots
- Clade: Asterids
- Order: Asterales
- Family: Asteraceae
- Tribe: Astereae
- Subtribe: Symphyotrichinae
- Genus: Symphyotrichum
- Subgenus: Symphyotrichum subg. Symphyotrichum
- Section: Symphyotrichum sect. Symphyotrichum
- Species: S. porteri

Binomial name
- Symphyotrichum porteri (A.Gray) G.L.Nesom
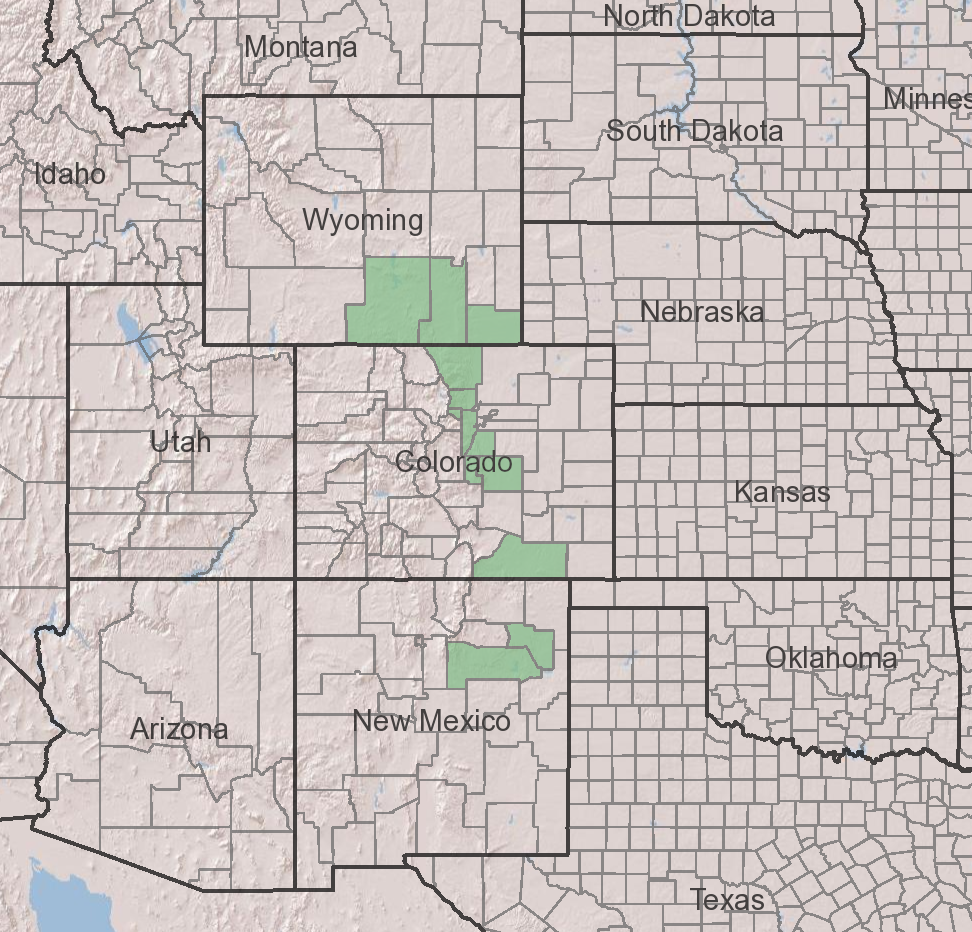
- Native distribution

Synonyms
- Aster ericoides var. strictus Porter; Aster porteri A.Gray

= Symphyotrichum porteri =

Species of flowering plant in the aster family

Symphyotrichum porteri (formerly Aster porteri) is a species of flowering plant in the family Asteraceae endemic to the foothills of the Rocky Mountains in the U.S. states of Wyoming, Colorado, and New Mexico. Commonly known as Porter's aster, it is a perennial, herbaceous plant that may reach 10 to 50 centimeters (4 to 20 inches) tall. Its flowers have white, rarely pinkish, ray florets and yellow, becoming pink then brown, disk florets. S. porteri grows at elevations of 1,800–2,900 meters (5,900–9,500 feet). Its limited range makes it a NatureServe Vulnerable (G3) species, and it is classified Critically Imperiled (S1) in Wyoming.

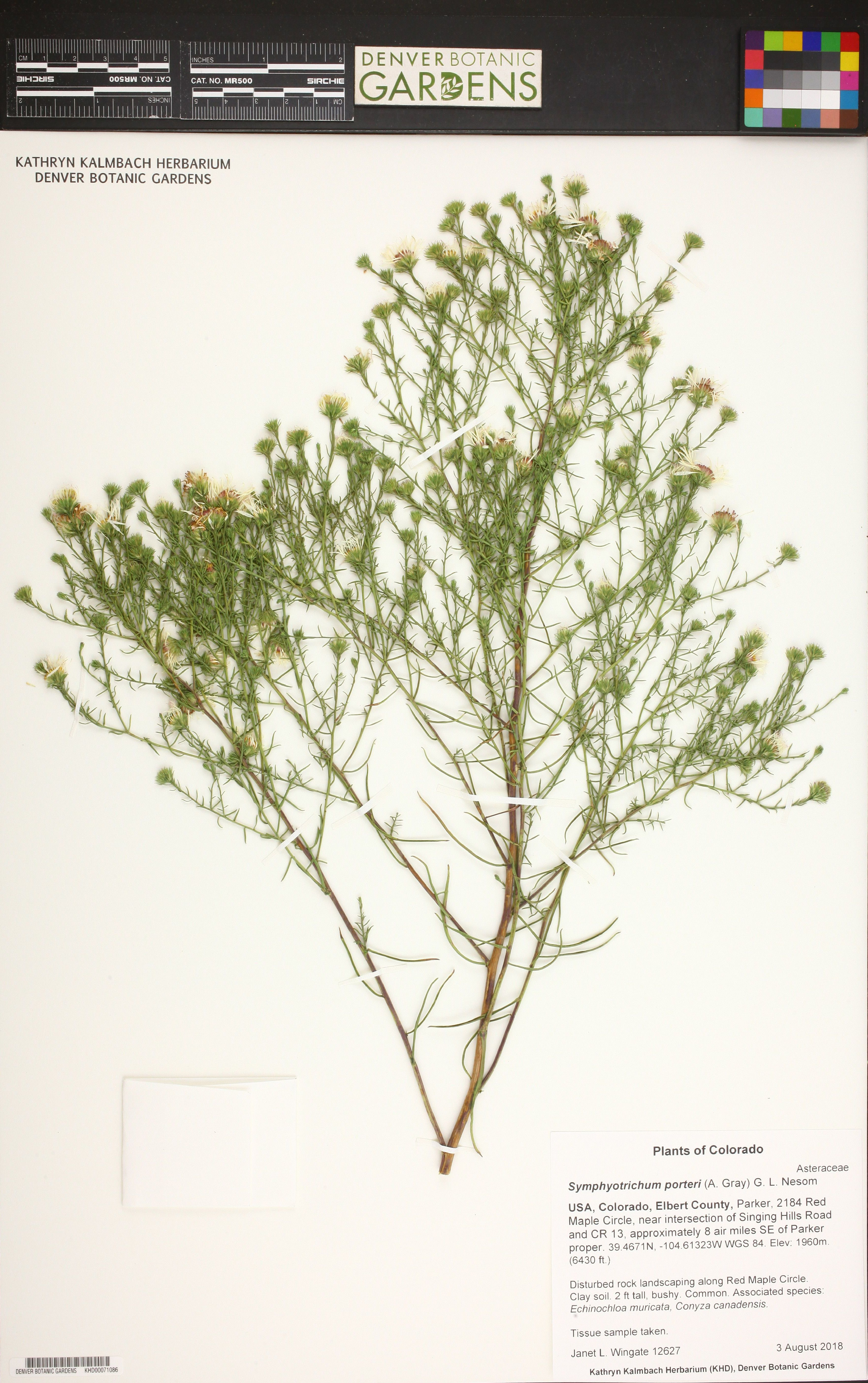
S. porteri herbarium specimen
