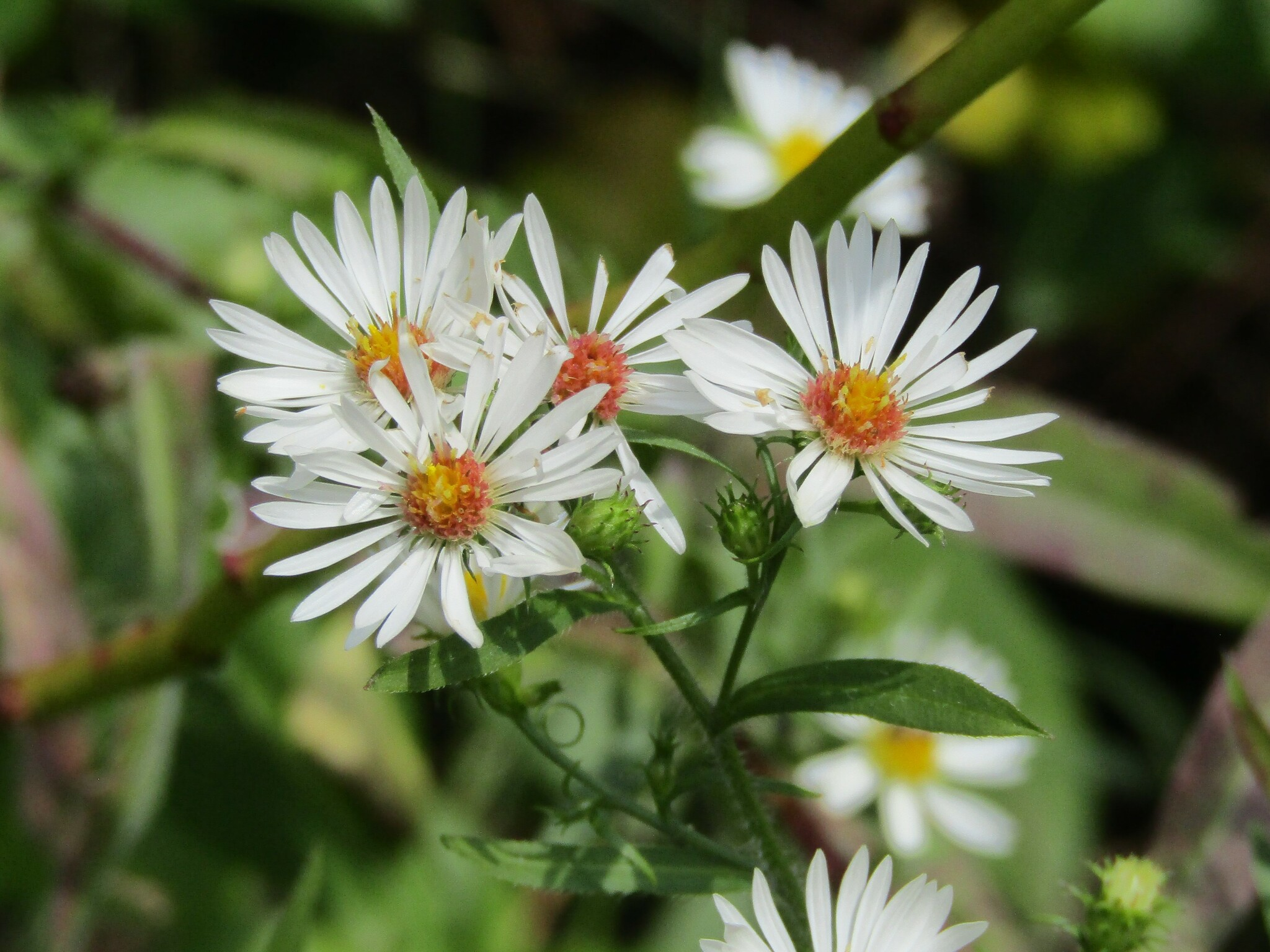
- S. pilosum var. pilosum
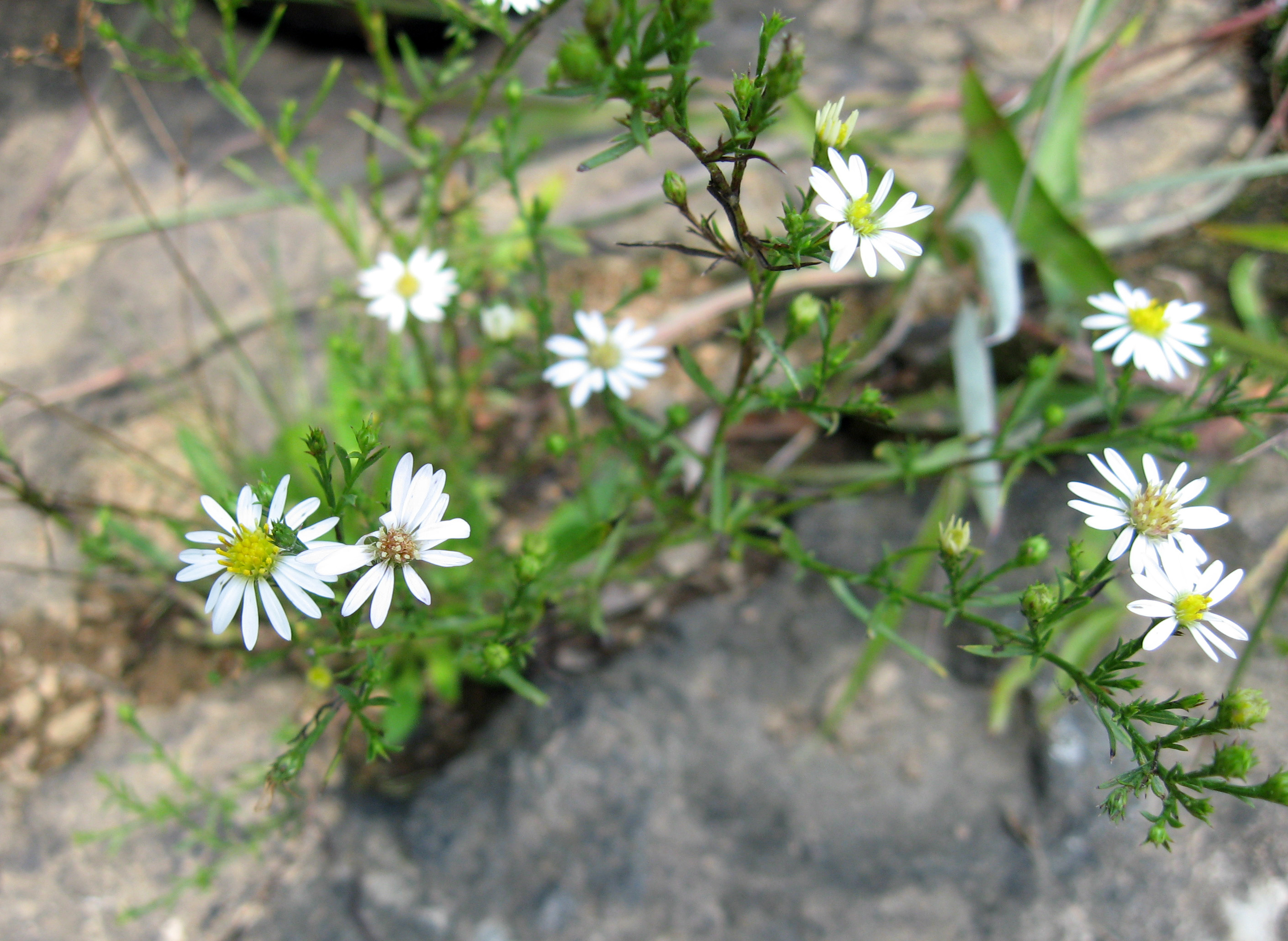
- S. pilosum var. pringlei

Conservation status
- Secure (NatureServe)

Scientific classification
- Kingdom: Plantae
- Clade: Tracheophytes
- Clade: Angiosperms
- Clade: Eudicots
- Clade: Asterids
- Order: Asterales
- Family: Asteraceae
- Genus: Symphyotrichum
- Species: S. pilosum

Binomial name
- Symphyotrichum pilosum (Willd.) G.L.Nesom

Varieties
- S. pilosum var. pilosum; S. pilosum var. pringlei (A.Gray) G.L.Nesom
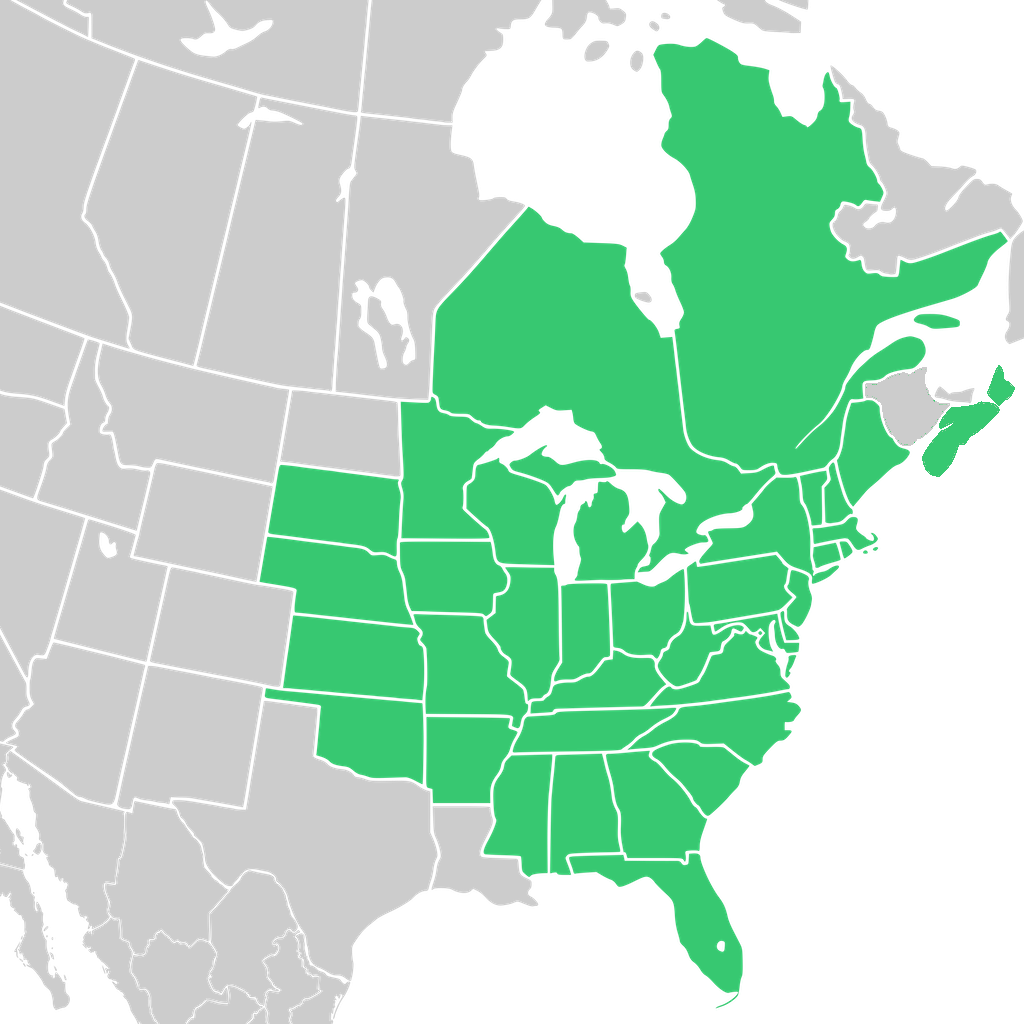
- Native distribution of both varieties of S. pilosum. See text for varietal maps.

Synonyms
- Basionym: Aster pilosus Willd.; Species: Aster chrysogonii Sennen; Aster ericoides var. pilosus (Willd.) Porter; Aster ericoides var. platyphyllus Torr. & A.Gray; Aster ericoides f. villosus (Torr. & A.Gray) Voss; Aster ericoides var. villosus Torr. & A.Gray; Aster juniperinus E.S.Burgess; Aster pilosus var. demotus S.F.Blake; Aster pilosus var. platyphyllus S.F.Blake; Aster pilosus f. pulchellus Benke; Aster villosus Michx., nom. illeg.; Variety pringlei: Aster ericoides var. pringlei A.Gray; Aster faxonii Porter; Aster pilosus var. pringlei S.F.Blake; Aster polyphyllus Willd., nom. illeg.; Aster pringlei Britton

= Symphyotrichum pilosum =

Species of flowering plant in the daisy family

Symphyotrichum pilosum (formerly Aster pilosus) is a perennial, herbaceous, flowering plant in the Asteraceae family native to central and eastern North America. It is commonly called hairy white oldfield aster, frost aster, white heath aster, heath aster, hairy aster, common old field aster, old field aster, awl aster, nailrod, and steelweed. There are two varieties: Symphyotrichum pilosum var. pilosum, known by the common names previously listed, and Symphyotrichum pilosum var. pringlei, known as Pringle's aster. Both varieties are conservationally secure globally and in most provinces and states where they are native.

The varieties differ in morphology, distribution, and habitat; S. pilosum var. pilosum is hairy, and S. pilosum var. pringlei is hairless, or nearly so. S. pilosum var. pilosum is the more widespread of the two and grows in various dry habitats, often with weeds. S. pilosum var. pringlei grows in higher-quality calcium-rich ecosystems, often with many non-weedy companion flora. S. pilosum has been introduced to several European and Asian countries.

The species usually reaches heights between 20 centimeters (8 inches) and 120 cm (4 feet). It blooms late summer to late fall with composite flowers that are 13 to 19 millimeters (0.5 to 0.75 in) wide and have white ray florets and yellow disk florets. S. pilosum var. pringlei has been used in the cultivar industry, and it and its cultivar 'Ochtendgloren' have won the Royal Horticultural Society's Award of Garden Merit.

== Description ==
Symphyotrichum pilosum is a perennial, herbaceous, flowering plant that reaches heights between 20 cm (8 in) and 120 cm (4 ft); some plants can be as short as 5 cm (2 in) and others up to or taller than 150 cm (5 ft). It flowers late summer to late fall, in the north ending in October and farther south in December.

There are two varieties: Symphyotrichum pilosum var. pilosum and S. pilosum var. pringlei. They differ in morphology, chromosome count, distribution, and habitat. S. pilosum var. pilosum is the autonym, with hairy stems and leaves. It is widespread and often weedy. S. pilosum var. pringlei is hairless, less common, and often grows in high-quality habitats.

=== Roots and stems ===
The roots of S. pilosum have bulky and branched caudices that sometimes have long rhizomes which store nutrients for the next year's flowering. The plant is cespitose with one to five straight stems. The two varieties have different stem surfaces: S. pilosum var. pilosum has hairy stems (pilose to densely hirsute), and S. pilosum var. pringlei has stems with no hair (glabrous) or at most, they are hairy in vertical lines.

=== Leaves ===
S. pilosum has thin, alternate, and simple leaves. Those of S. pilosum var. pilosum are hairy, and those of S. pilosum var. pringlei are hairless or nearly hairless. Leaves grow at the base, on the stem, and in the inflorescence branches. The ground leaves (basal leaves) are either sessile or have very short leafstalks with sheathing wings fringed with hairs on the margins (edges), meaning they are ciliate. They are oblanceolate or obovate to spatulate with obtuse to rounded tips, and their bases are attenuate. (Note: Attenuate base is defined as "[h]aving leaf tissue taper down the petiole to a narrow base, always having some leaf material on each side of the petiole". (Copied definition from Glossary of leaf morphology; see that page's history for attribution.)) Their margins are slightly wavy or saw-toothed, mostly near the tips. Basal leaves range in lengths from 10 to 60 mm (0.4 to 2 in) and widths from 5 to 15 mm (0.2 to 0.6 in). They grow in a rosette and develop prior to flowering, then wither or die during plant growth. At the time of flowering, another rosette of basal leaves forms.

Lower stem leaves usually wither by flowering, and they often have small leaves in clusters at the stem nodes. These stem leaves are entire (smooth on the margins) to saw-toothed and have soft cilia. Their tips are attenuate, and the leaves are elliptic-oblanceolate, elliptic-oblong, linear-lanceolate, or linear-oblanceolate. The leaf bases can be petiolate or subpetiolate to subsessile, and they clasp the stem with attenuate to cuneate bases (Note: Cuneate base is defined as "[t]riangular, wedge-shaped" where the leaf attaches to the stem. (Part of this definition was copied from Glossary of leaf morphology; see that page's history for attribution.)) with wings. Lengths are from 40 to 102 mm (1.6 to 4.0 in) and widths from 5 to 25 mm (0.2 to 1 in), getting progressively smaller as they approach the upper portion of the stem.

Distal leaves, higher on the stem and on the branches with the flower heads, are lance-oblong, linear-lanceolate, linear, linear-oblanceolate, or linear-subulate. Their margins are entire or saw-toothed, and they are sessile with cuneate bases. Lengths range from 10 to 100 mm (0.4 to 4 in) and widths are 1 to 8 mm (0.04 to 0.3 in). The leaves get progressively smaller near the inflorescences; closest to the flower heads, their sizes are abruptly reduced.

Stem and leaf morphology
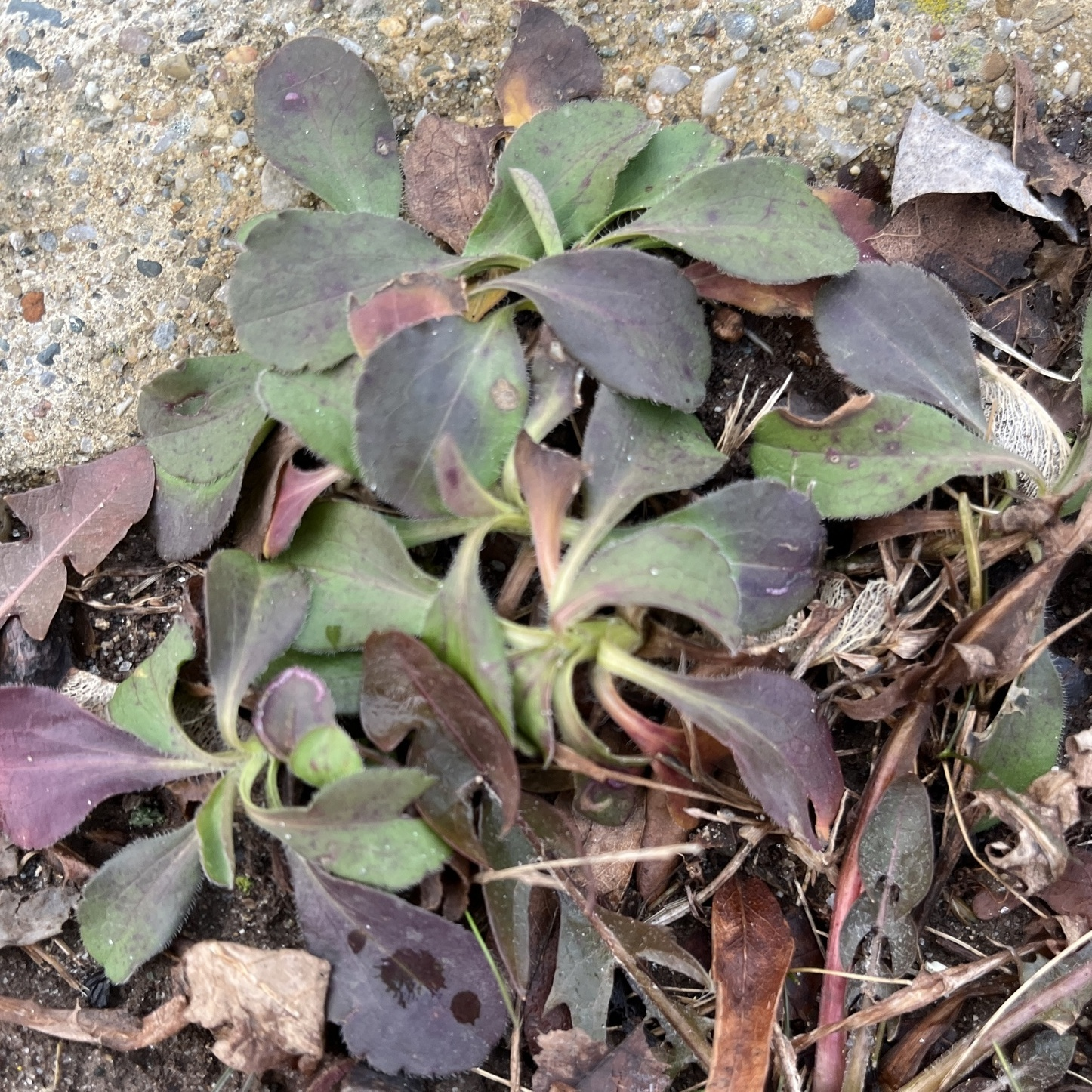
Basal leaf rosettes

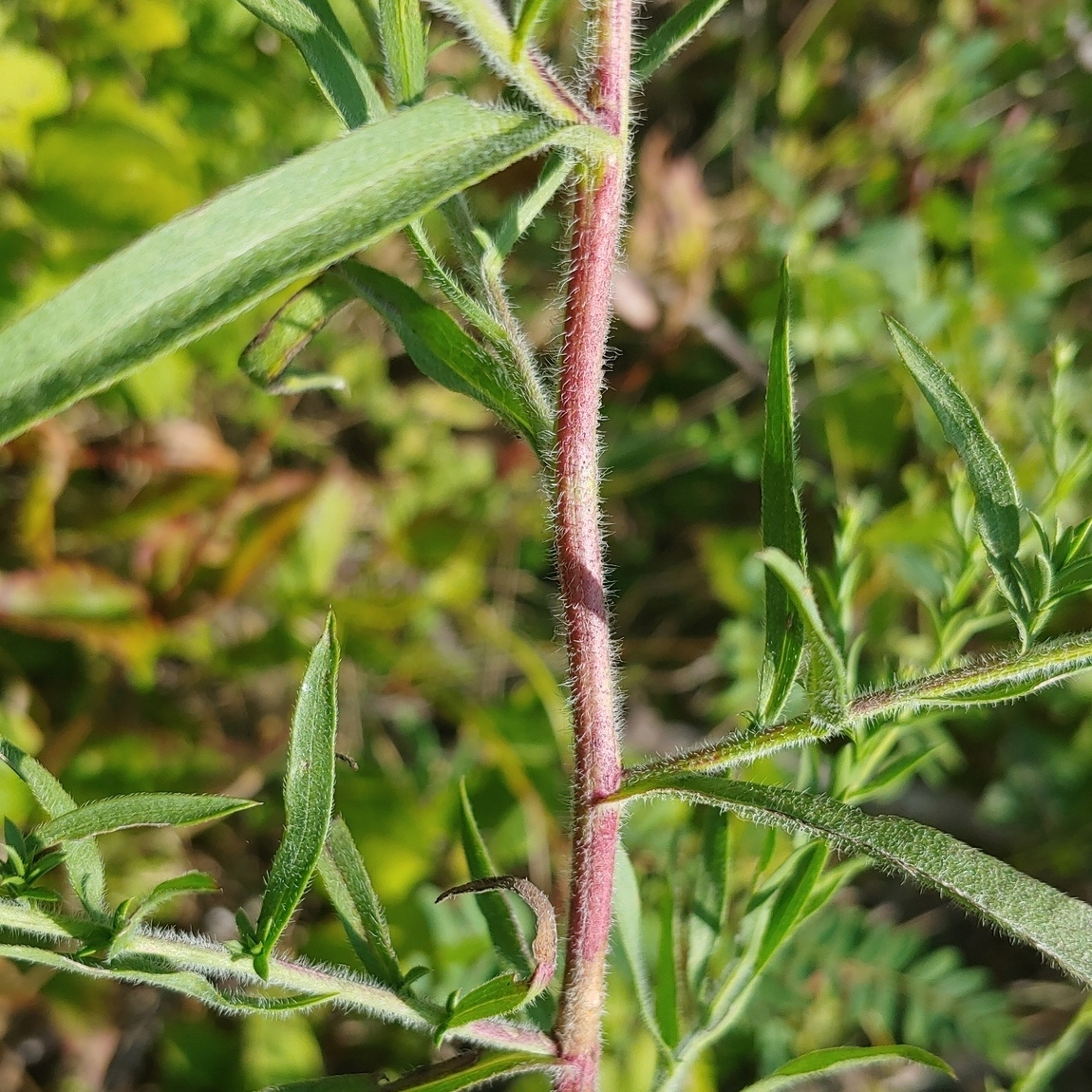
Stem and leaves

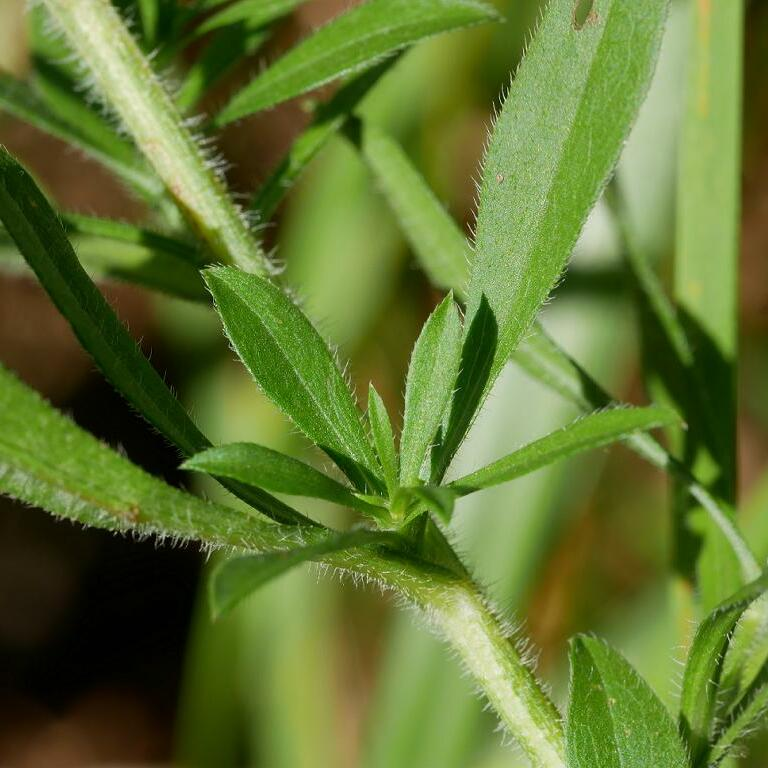
Cluster of small leaves at a stem node

=== Flowers ===
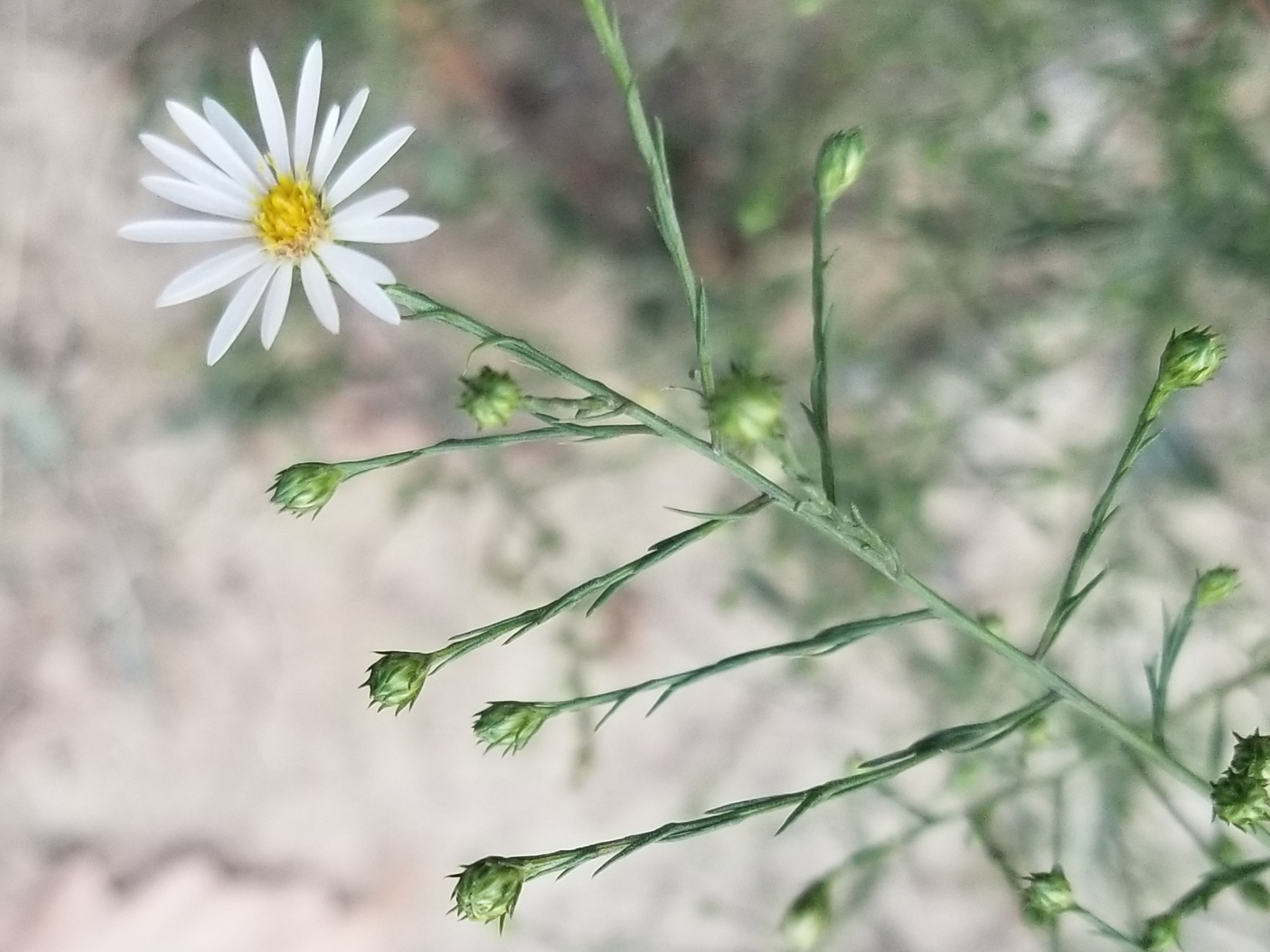
S. pilosum var. pringlei inflorescence showing a branch with many peduncles, each with its own flower head. The inflorescence is in the shape of a pyramid.

The flower heads of Symphyotrichum pilosum are 13 to 19 mm (0.5 to 0.75 in) wide and grow on branches that are 100 mm (4 in) or less at wide angles off the stem (divaricate). They also may be ascending and arching. They are open, generally not crowded, and have many small leaves. Each flower head is on a peduncle that is usually 5 to 30 mm (0.20 to 1.2 in), sometimes as long as 50 mm (2 in). They get shorter the farther up the branch they grow which then causes the inflorescence to look like a pyramid. The peduncles of S. pilosum var. pilosum have dense and bristly hairs (hispid), and those of S. p. var. pringlei are hairless (glabrous). Both varieties have from 7 to 25 or more bracts that are glabrous and may have cilia.

==== Involucres and phyllaries ====
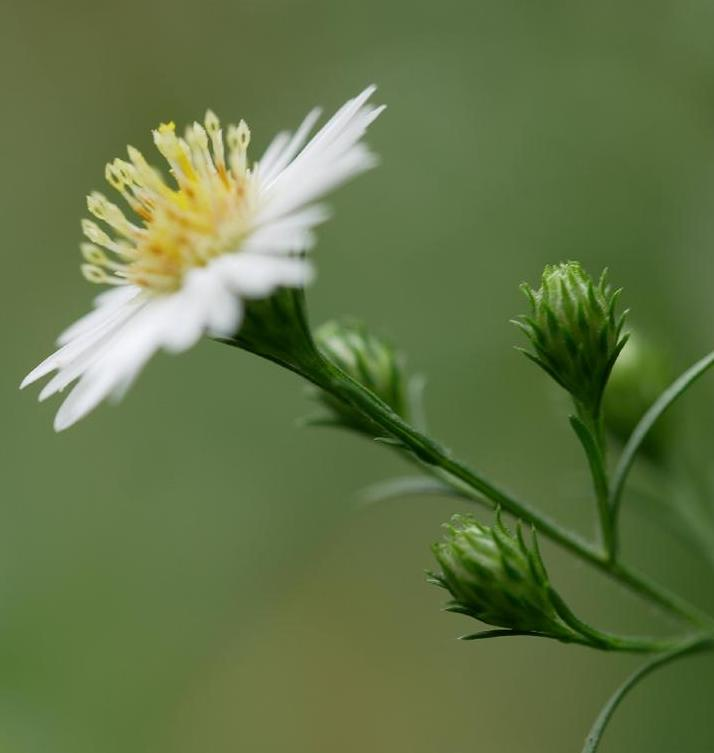
Flower heads

Flower heads of all members of the Asteraceae family have phyllaries which are small, specialized leaves that look like scales. Together they form the involucre that protects the individual flowers in the head before they open. (Note: See Asteraceae § Flowers for more detail.) The involucres of Symphyotrichum pilosum are campanulate to cylindro-campanulate in shape (bell to cylinder-bell) and usually 3.5 to 5.1 mm (0.14 to 0.20 in) in length, although they can be as short as 2.5 mm (0.1 in) and as long as 6.5 mm (0.26 in).

The phyllaries of S. pilosum var. pilosum have small and sparse hairs, meaning they are hirsutulous, and those of variety pringlei are glabrous. Both varieties have phyllaries in 4 to 6 rows that are unequally aligned, and rarely subequally aligned. The phyllaries are appressed or slightly spreading, and the outer ones are oblong-lanceolate in shape, while the inner are linear. They have green chlorophyllous zones that are lanceolate to lance-rhombic with apices (tips) that have either short and sharp points (acute) or taper to long points (acuminate). Their margins appear white or light green, but they are actually translucent and may appear nibbled or worn away (in botanical terms, they are scarious and erose). They are inrolled at the tips.

==== Florets ====
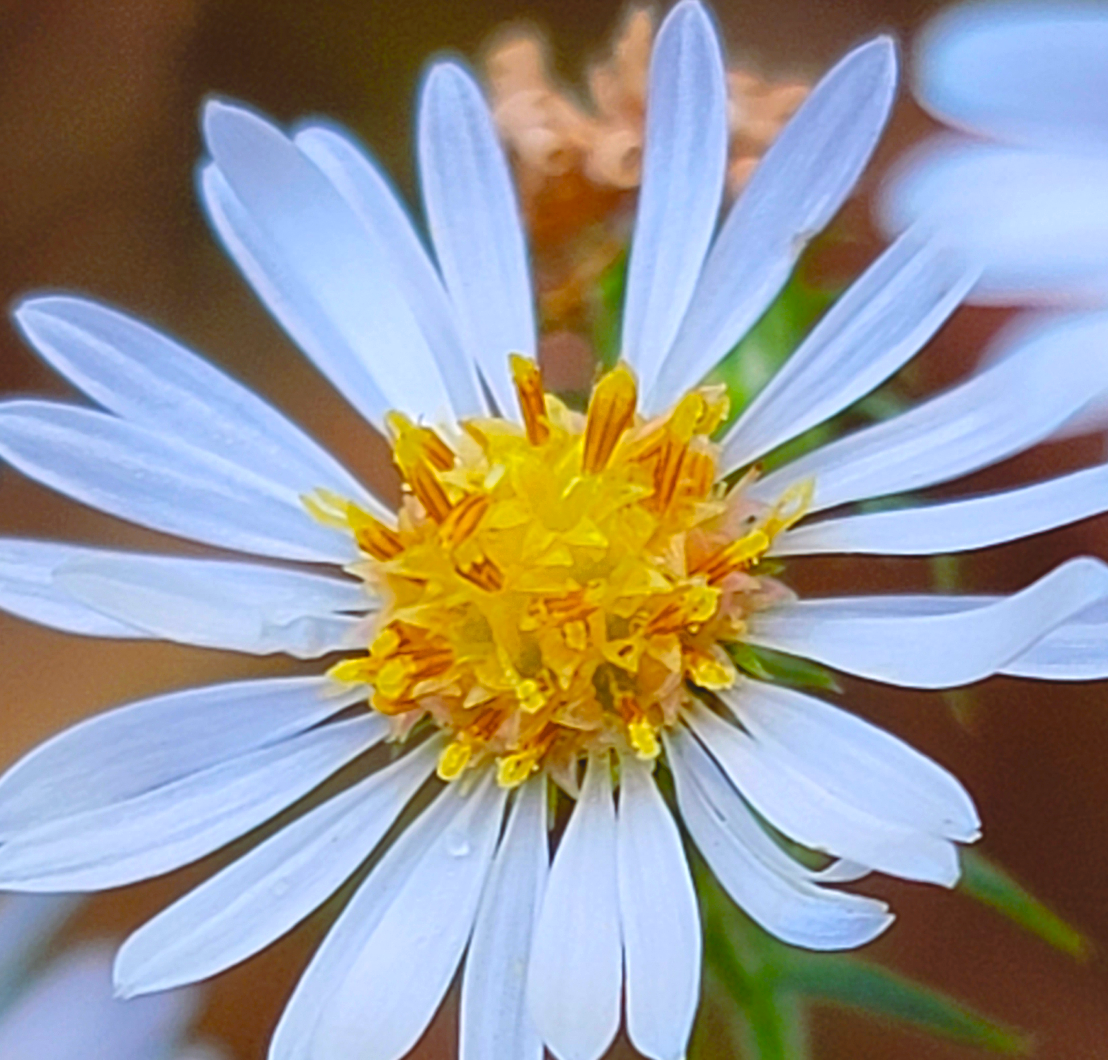
Close-up of flower head showing open and closed disk florets with elongated stamens, some with pollen still attached

Each flower head is made up of ray florets and disk florets. The 16 to 28 (Note: Outside range 10 to 38) ray florets grow in one series and are usually white, rarely pinkish or bluish. They are usually between 5.4 and 7.5 mm (0.21 and 0.30 in) in length, but can be as short as 4 mm (0.16 in) and as long as 11 mm (0.43 in). They are 0.4 to 1.7 mm (0.016 to 0.067 in) wide and they make up about 45% of the total number of florets on a flower head.

The disks have 17 to 39 (Note: Outside range 13 to 67) florets that start out as yellow and after opening, turn reddish purple or brown after pollination. Each disk floret is 3.4 to 4.1 mm (0.13 to 0.16 in) in depth, sometimes up to 5.5 mm (0.22 in), and is made up of 5 petals, collectively a corolla, which open into 5 lanceolate lobes comprising 0.4 to 1 mm (0.02 to 0.04 in) of the depth of the floret.

=== Fruit ===
The fruits of Symphyotrichum pilosum are not true achenes but are cypselae, resembling an achene and surrounded by a calyx sheath. This is true for all members of the Asteraceae family. After pollination, they become off-white or gray with an oblong-obovoid shape, 1 to 1.5 mm (0.04 to 0.06 in) in length, and 0.5 to 0.7 mm (0.02 to 0.03 in) in width. They have 4 to 6 nerves and a few stiff, slender bristles on their surfaces (strigillose). Their pappi (tufts of hairs) are white and 3.5 to 4 mm (0.14 to 0.16 in) in length. The seeds mature late in the season but cannot germinate at low temperatures. They are dispersed by the fall and winter winds and germinate when temperatures become warm in the spring.

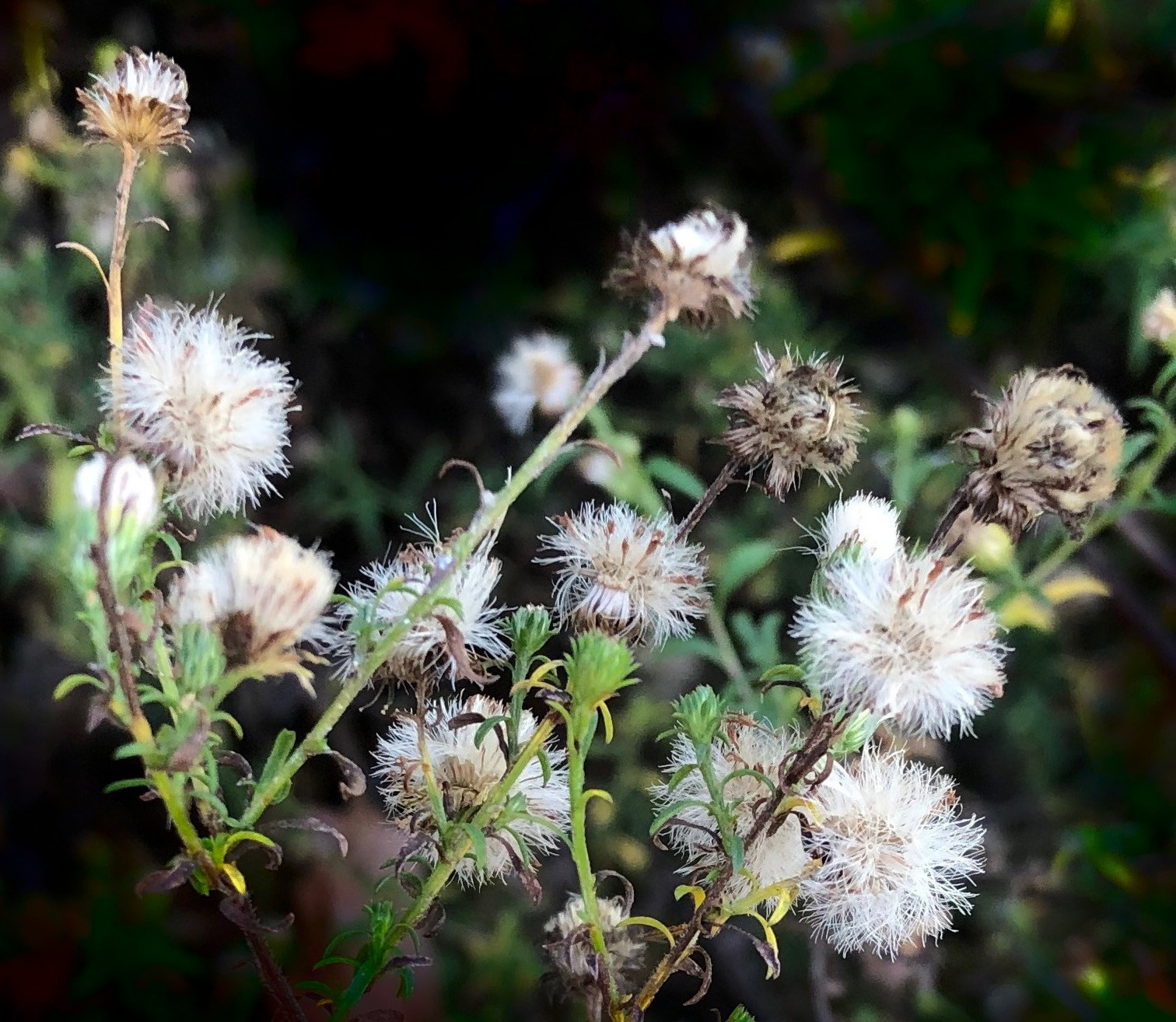
Fruiting plant showing many cypselae with pappi

=== Chromosomes ===
S. pilosum has a monoploid number (also called base number) of eight chromosomes (x = 8). There are plants of S. pilosum var. pilosum with four and six sets of the chromosomes, tetraploid with 32 total and hexaploid with 48 total, respectively. These cytotypes occur regularly, with occasional pentaploids (five sets) that have 40 in total. S. pilosum var. pringlei is hexaploid with a total chromosome count of 48.

Differences in morphology have been found between tetraploids and hexaploids of S. pilosum var. pilosum in southwestern Ontario, including involucre and floret sizes, branch length, leaf sizes, and others; they are consistently smaller on tetraploids than on hexaploids. Additionally, the leaf hair on tetraploids is denser than on hexaploids.

== Taxonomy ==
=== Etymology ===
The specific epithet, second part of the scientific name, pilosum is from Latin pilosus meaning "with long soft hairs". The species has the common names of hairy white oldfield aster, frost aster, white heath aster, heath aster, hairy aster, common old field aster, and steelweed. Symphyotrichum pilosum var. pringlei is commonly known as Pringle's aster and was named for American botanist Cyrus Guernsey Pringle.

=== Type specimens ===
As of November 2022, the holotype of Symphyotrichum pilosum, as Aster pilosus, was stored at the Herbarium Berolinense, Berlin Botanical Garden and Botanical Museum, Germany, and the Symphyotrichum pilosum var. pringlei, as Aster ericoides var. pringlei, holotype was stored at the United States National Herbarium, National Museum of Natural History, Smithsonian Institution, Washington, D.C. Images of both specimen sheets are shown in this section and were available at that time for more detailed viewing at the virtual online collection websites of their respective herbaria.

Holotypes of Aster pilosus Willd. and Aster ericoides var. pringlei A.Gray
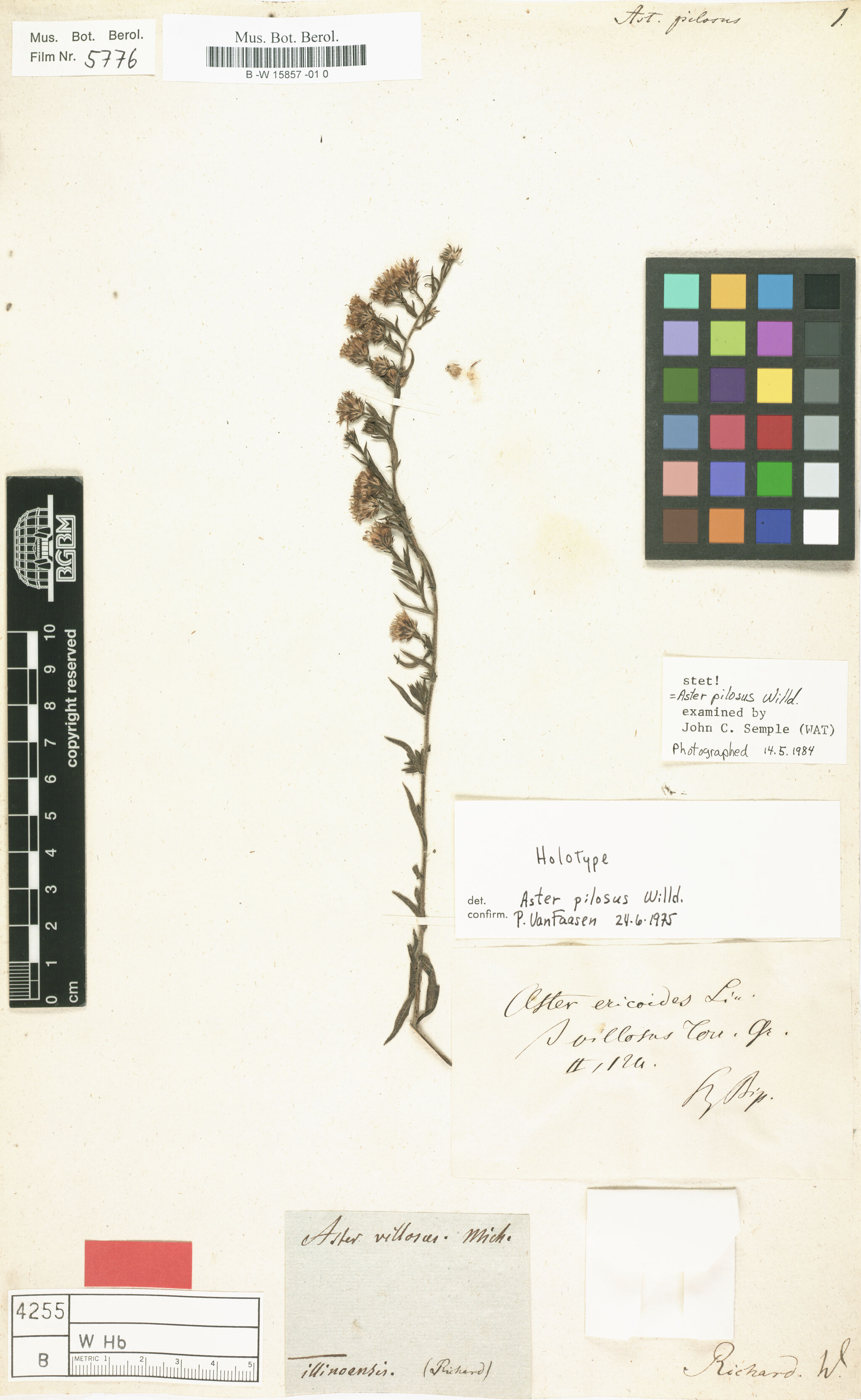
Aster pilosus Willd.
holotype stored at the Berlin Botanical Garden and Botanical Museum

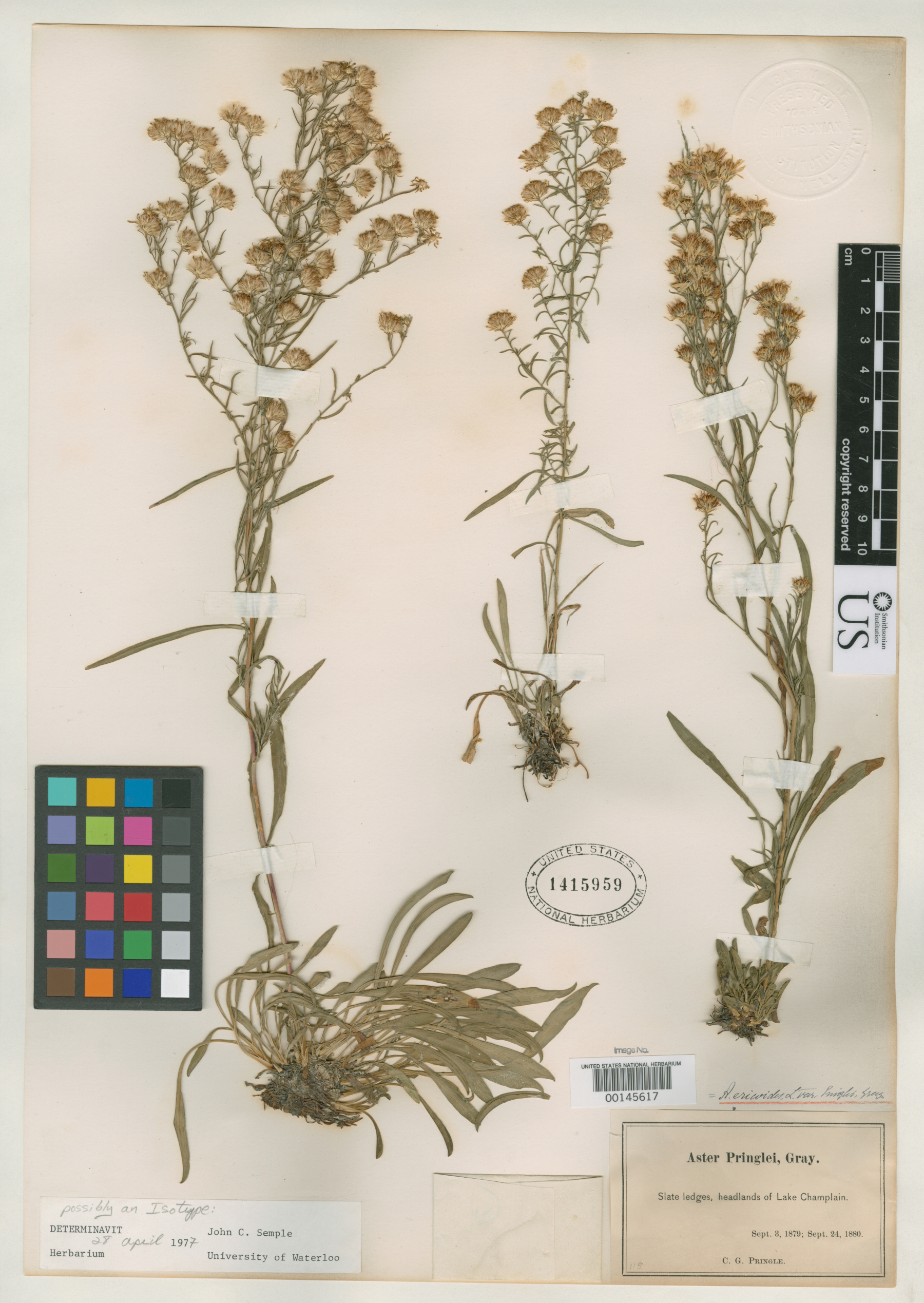
Aster ericoides var. pringlei A.Gray
holotype stored at the National Museum of Natural History, Smithsonian Institution

=== Classification ===
Symphyotrichum pilosum is classified in subgenus Symphyotrichum section Symphyotrichum subsection Porteriani. This subsection contains four species in addition to S. pilosum: S. depauperatum (serpentine aster), S. kentuckiense (Kentucky aster), S. parviceps (smallhead aster), and S. porteri (Porter's aster). Two commonalities among the five species are their revolute phyllaries and their summer- and fall-forming basal leaf rosettes.

Symphyotrichum cladogram
- - Symphyotrichum
    - subg. Chapmaniana
      S. chapmanii
    - subg. Astropolium
      - S. divaricatum
      - S. glabrifolium
      - S. graminifolium
      - S. martii
      - S. parviflorum
      - S. patagonicum
      - S. peteroanum
      - S. potosinum
      - S. regnellii
      - S. subulatum
      - S. tenuifolium
      - S. vahlii
    - subg. Virgulus
      - sect. Ericoidei
        - S. ericoides
        - S. falcatum
      - sect. Patentes
        - ssect. Brachyphylli
          - S. adnatum
          - S. walteri
        - ssect. Patentes
          - S. georgianum
          - S. patens
          - S. phlogifolium
      - sect. Grandiflori
        - ssect. Mexicanae
          - S. bimater
          - S. chihuahuense
          - S. hintonii
          - S. moranense
          - S. purpurascens
          - S. trilineatum
          - S. turneri
        - ssect. Grandiflori
          - S. campestre
          - S. estesii
          - S. fendleri
          - S. fontinale
          - S. grandiflorum
          - S. oblongifolium
          - S. pygmaeum
          - S. yukonense
      - sect. Polyliguli
        S. novae-angliae
      - sect. Concolores
        - S. concolor
        - S. lucayanum
        - S. plumosum
        - S. pratense
        - S. sericeum
    - subg. Ascendentes (Note: Sugbenus Ascendentes is made up of two allopolyploid species with historic parents from subg. Virgulus and subg. Symphyotrichum.)
      - S. ascendens
      - S. defoliatum
    - subg. Symphyotrichum
      - sect. Conyzopsis
        - S. ciliatum
        - S. frondosum
        - S. laurentianum
      - sect. Occidentales
        - S. chilense
        - S. eatonii
        - S. foliaceum
        - S. greatae
        - S. hallii
        - S. hendersonii
        - S. jessicae
        - S. lentum
        - S. molle
        - S. spathulatum
        - S. subspicatum
      - sect. Turbinelli
        S. turbinellum
      - sect. Symphyotrichum
        - ssect. Dumosi
          - S. boreale
          - S. bullatum
          - S. burgessii
          - S. carnerosanum
          - S. dumosum
          - S. eulae
          - S. lanceolatum
          - S. lateriflorum
          - S. leone
          - S. nahanniense
          - S. ontarionis
          - S. praealtum
          - S. racemosum
          - S. schaffneri
          - S. simmondsii
          - S. tradescantii
          - S. welshii
        - ssect. Heterophylli
          - ser. Concinni
            - S. laeve
            - S. oolentangiense
          - ser. Cordifolii
            - S. anomalum
            - S. ciliolatum
            - S. cordifolium
            - S. drummondii
            - S. shortii
            - S. undulatum
            - S. urophyllum
        - ssect. Porteriani
          - S. depauperatum
          - S. kentuckiense
          - S. parviceps
          - S. pilosum
          - S. porteri
        - ssect. Symphyotrichum
          - ser. Punicei
            - S. elliottii
            - S. firmum
            - S. prenanthoides
            - S. puniceum
            - S. rhiannon
          - ser. Symphyotrichum
            - S. anticostense
            - S. novi-belgii
            - S. retroflexum
            - S. robynsianum
  Cladogram references

=== Varieties ===
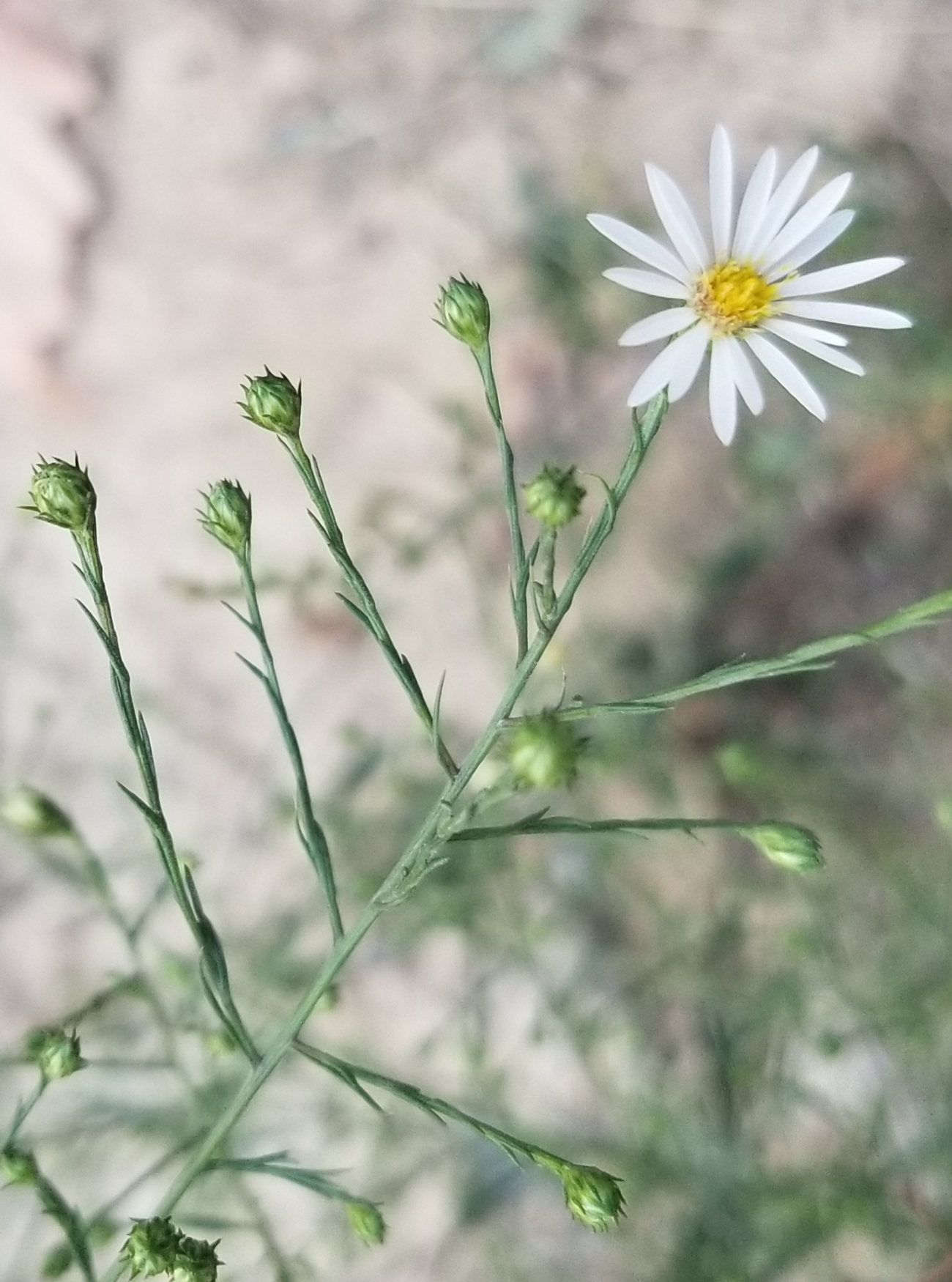
Symphyotrichum pilosum var. pringlei in Rothrock State Forest near Huntingdon, Pennsylvania

Two varieties are accepted by Plants of the World Online (POWO). Determining the best taxonomy for this group has been difficult due to polyploidy and hybridization. The two currently recognized varieties are

- S. pilosum var. pilosum (autonym), with hairy stems and leaves, widespread, and often weedy; and,
- S. pilosum var. pringlei, commonly called Pringle's aster and named for American botanist Cyrus Guernsey Pringle.

=== Hybridization ===
Putative hybridization of Symphyotrichum pilosum var. pilosum with twelve species of the genus has been reported: S. cordifolium (common blue wood aster), S. drummondii (Drummond's aster), S. dumosum (bushy aster), S. laeve (smooth aster), S. lanceolatum (panicled aster), S. novi-belgii (New York aster), S. oolentangiense (skyblue aster), S. parviceps (smallhead aster), S. praealtum (willowleaf aster), S. racemosum (small white aster), S. tradescantii (shore aster), and S. urophyllum (arrowleaf aster). Additionally, it has been determined that pollination has occurred between the two varieties or between the tetraploid and hexaploid cytotypes of S. p. var. pilosum based on the discovery of pentaploids of that variety.

== Distribution ==
=== Native ===
Both varieties of Symphyotrichum pilosum are native to central and eastern Canada and the United States, with the more common being S. pilosum var. pilosum.

==== Variety pilosum ====
Sources differ slightly on the distribution of S. pilosum var. pilosum. According to Flora of North America (FNA), it is native from west starting in Minnesota, then east to Maine, including Ontario and Québec; south along the Atlantic Seaboard including most southern and eastern states; the entire Midwest; the states bordering the Mississippi River except Louisiana; then with a northwest border to Arkansas; and, four Great Plains states, from south to north, Oklahoma, Kansas, Nebraska, and South Dakota. States on the Atlantic Seaboard with no reported presence are Connecticut, Delaware, Maryland, Rhode Island, and Vermont, plus West Virginia. FNA reports that it has been introduced to the Canadian provinces of British Columbia, New Brunswick, and Nova Scotia.

POWO and NatureServe provide slightly different distribution information on this variety. According to POWO, it also is present in and native to Maryland, New Brunswick, and Nova Scotia. Like FNA, however, POWO reports that it is an introduced species in British Columbia. NatureServe's map for S. pilosum var. pilosum differs from FNA's with an additional introduced presence on Prince Edward Island; no presence in New Hampshire, Nebraska, or South Dakota; and, a presence in Connecticut, Delaware, Louisiana, Maryland, Rhode Island, and Washington, D.C.

==== Variety pringlei ====
S. pilosum var. pringlei is an east-central and northeastern North American variety, and according to FNA and POWO, it is native to the area encompassing Minnesota in the northwest then east to Québec and Nova Scotia, in the United States on the Atlantic Seaboard south to North Carolina, then northwest to Kentucky, Illinois, and then north to Wisconsin. NatureServe differs and includes a presence for this variety in Arkansas, Georgia, South Carolina, and Tennessee.

Varietal native distributions by province and state
as reported in Flora of North America (FNA)
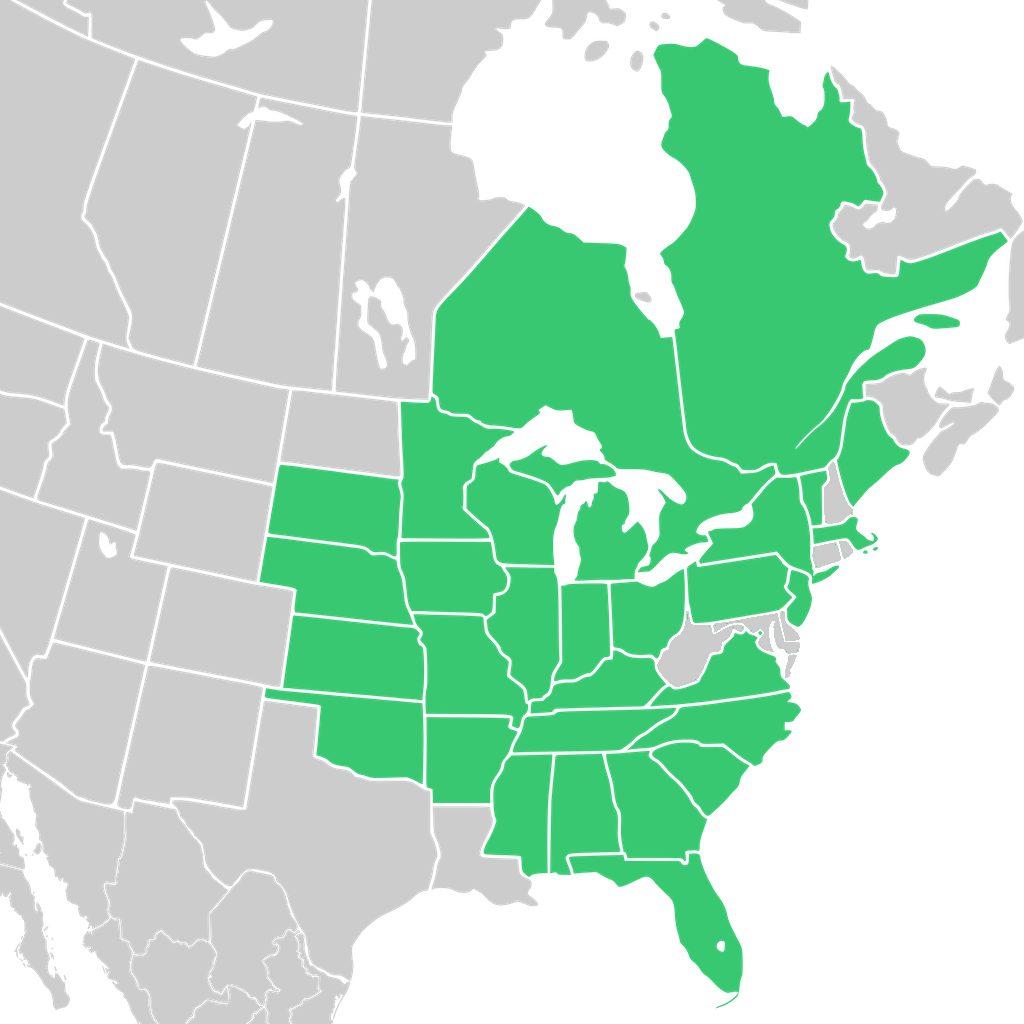
S. pilosum var. pilosum

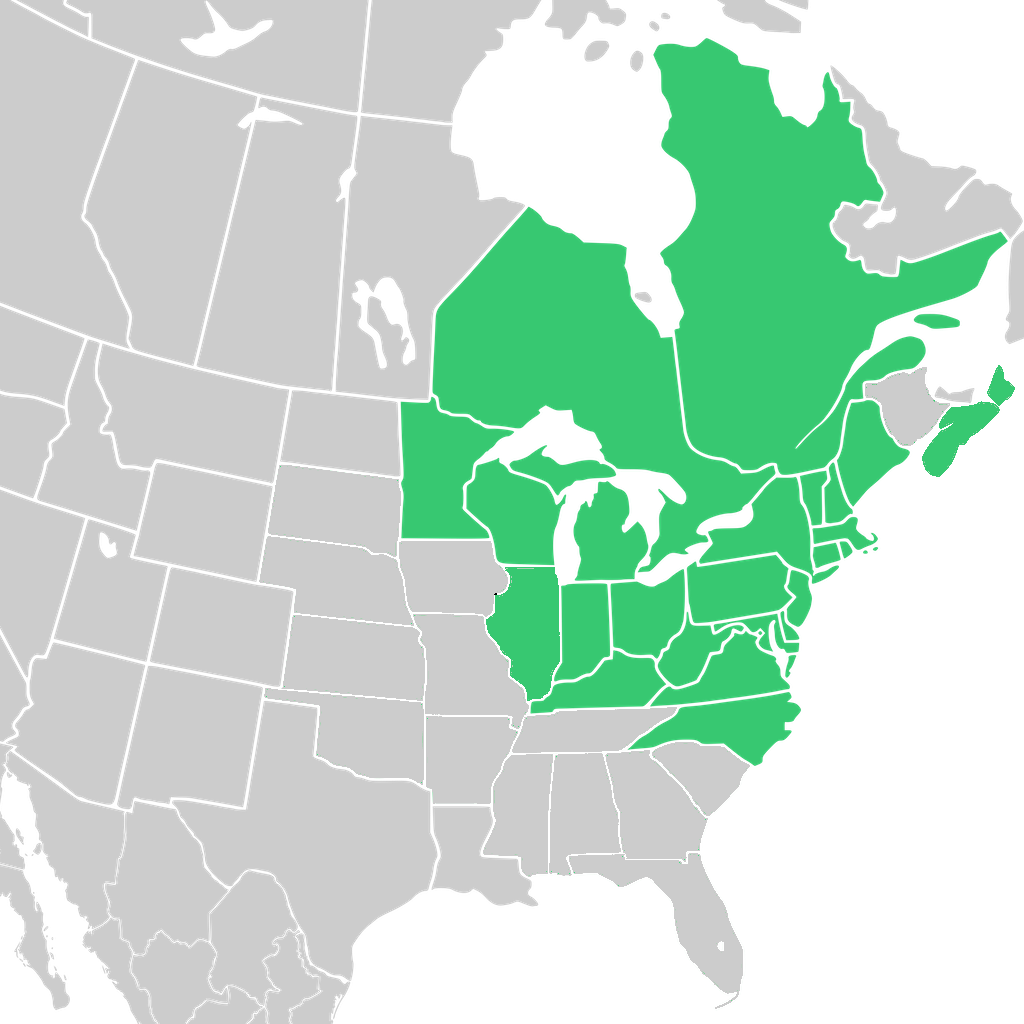
S. pilosum var. pringlei

=== Introduced ===
As of November 2022, S. pilosum var. pilosum was reported by NatureServe as an introduced species in the Canadian provinces of British Columbia, New Brunswick, Nova Scotia, and Prince Edward Island; and, by POWO in the countries of Belgium, France, Germany, Great Britain, India, Italy, Korea, Netherlands, and Spain. As of August 2022, it was not on the European Union's List of invasive alien species of Union concern.

== Habitat ==
=== Variety pilosum habitat ===
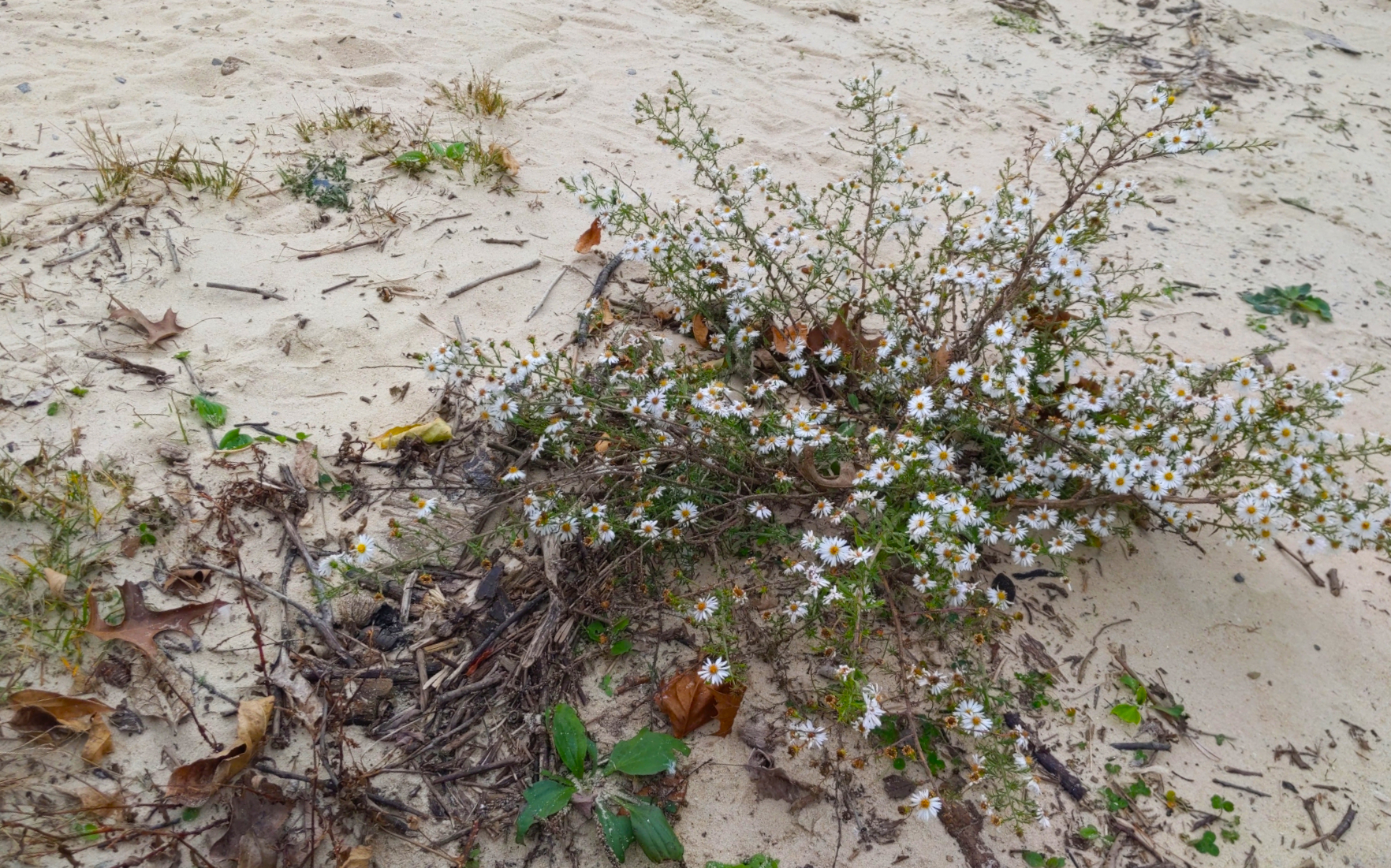
S. p. var. pilosum growing in the sand near Blue Marsh Lake, Berks County, Pennsylvania, United States

S. pilosum var. pilosum is tolerant of harsh growing conditions. It usually is found at elevations between sea level and 1,000 meters (3,300 feet) in disturbed areas such as fallowed land, old fields, roadsides, salted roadsides, railroads, pastures, landfills, and quarries. It occurs less frequently in natural prairies, open deciduous woods, limestone outcrops, and, very uncommonly, wetlands. Hexaploids of this variety are usually founds in habitats that were once covered in glaciers.

=== Variety pringlei habitat ===
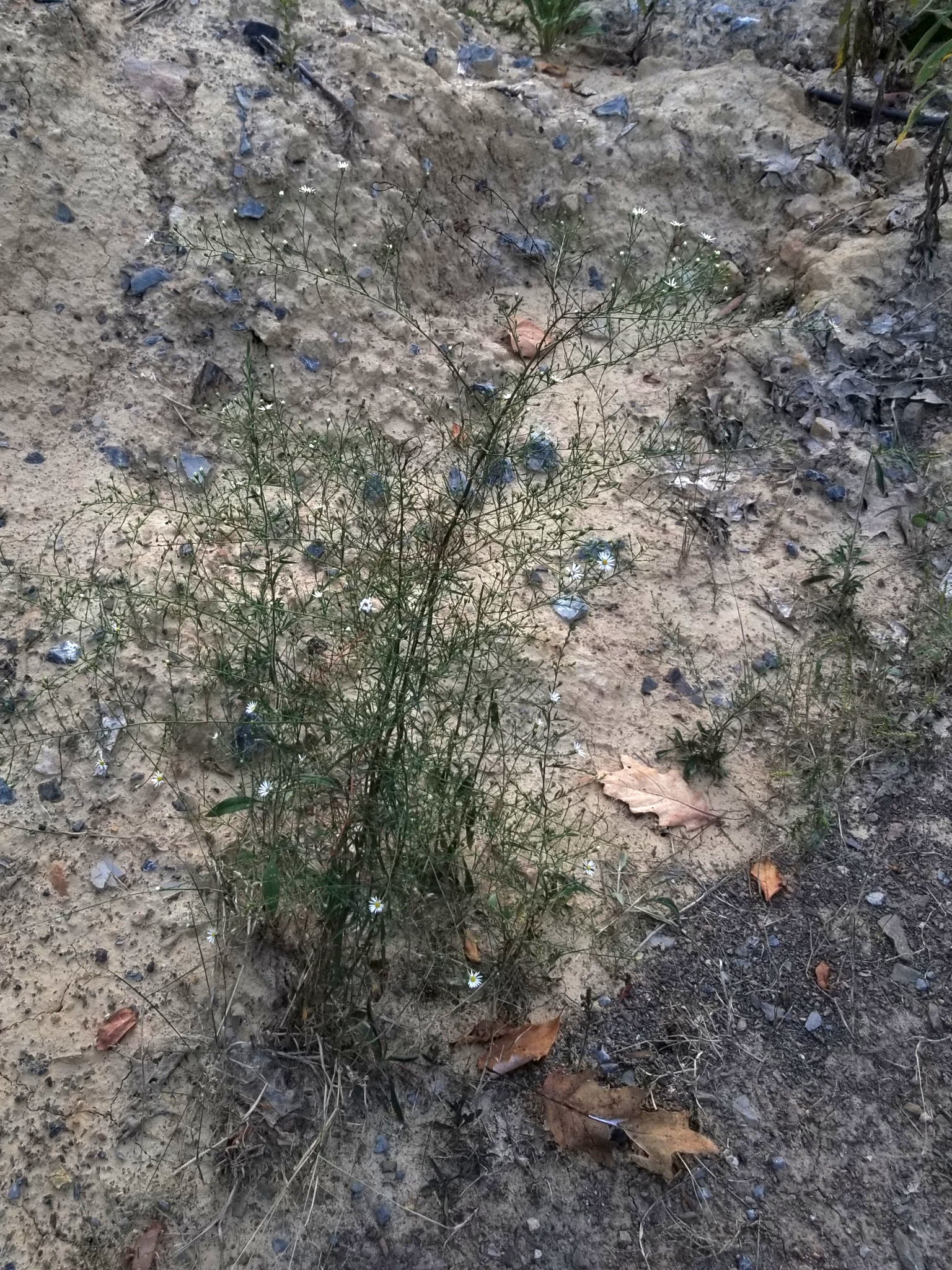
S. pilosum var. pringlei at Rocky Ridge Natural Area, Rothrock State Forest, Huntingdon County, Pennsylvania, United States, which has exposures of limestone and Oriskany sandstone

S. pilosum var. pringlei is common in calcium-rich ecosystems such as calcareous grasslands and fens, limestone alvars, shale outcrops, and marly pannes. (Note: Marl is "carbonate-rich mud or mudstone which contains variable amounts of clays and silt". (Copied definition from Marl; see that page's history for attribution.) A panne is a "wetland consisting of a small depression, with or without standing water". (Copied definition from the Wiktionary English noun ecology entry for panne; see that page's history for attribution.)) It also has been found in various partially-sandy or sandy areas, on moraine cliffs along lakes in woodland openings, and in environments similar to these. It can be found in habitats attractive to S. pilosum var. pilosum almost as equally as in the higher-quality ones previously mentioned. Elevations of occurrences are from sea level to 1,100 meters (3,600 feet), sometimes higher.

=== Wetland indicator statuses ===
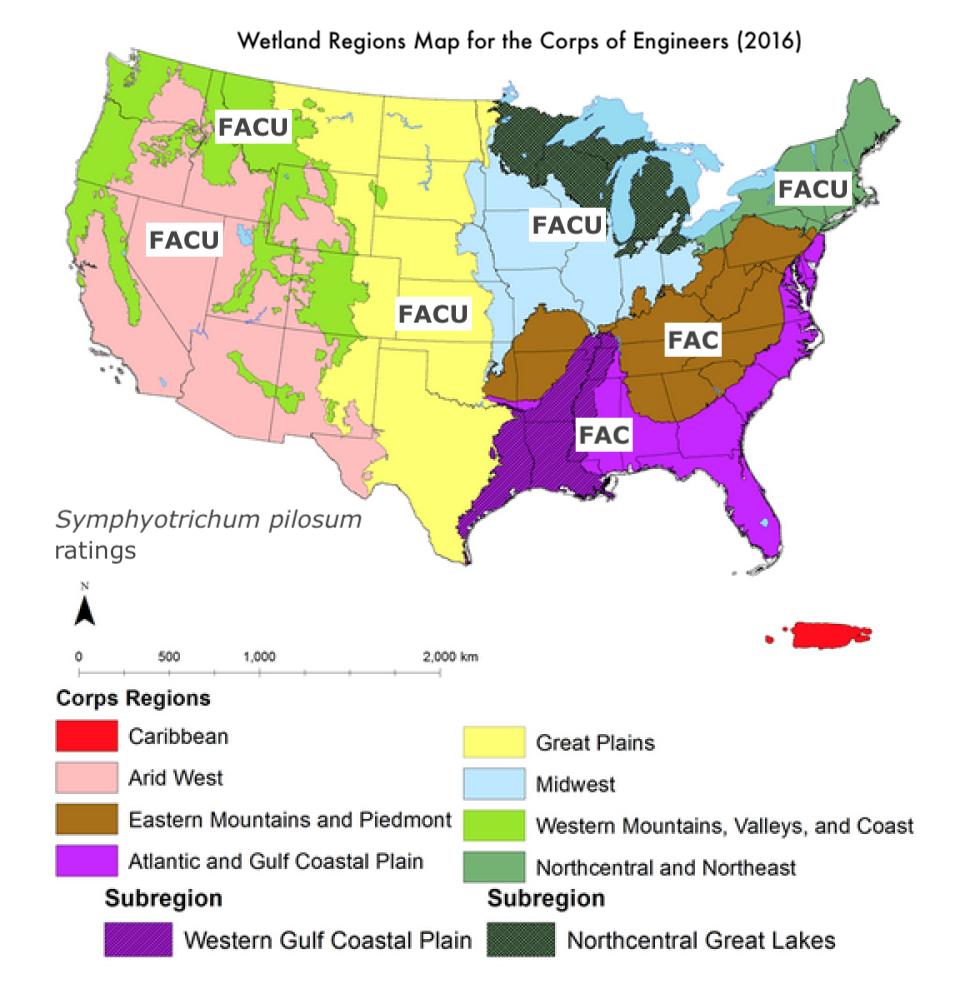
US Army Corps of Engineers wetland regions map (2016) labeled with the 2020 wetland indicator status ratings for S. pilosum

Symphyotrichum pilosum is categorized on the United States National Wetland Plant List (NWPL) with the wetland indicator status rating of Facultative (FAC) in the Atlantic and Gulf Coastal Plain (AGCP) and the Eastern Mountains and Piedmont (EMP) regions. The FAC rating means that S. pilosum is likely to occur either in wetlands or non-wetlands. It is categorized Facultative Upland (FACU) in the Arid West (AW), Great Plains (GP), Midwest (MW), Northcentral and Northeast (NCNE), and Western Mountains, Valleys, and Coast (WMVC) regions. Rating FACU means that it usually occurs in non-wetlands within its range, but can occasionally be found in wetlands.

== Conservation ==
NatureServe lists the species and its varieties with various conservation statuses, and some states and provinces within range do not have statuses. As of November 2022, S. pilosum was listed as Globally Secure (G5); and, State Secure (S5) in Ontario, Delaware, Georgia, Iowa, Mississippi, New York, North Carolina, Virginia, and West Virginia.

S. pilosum var. pilosum was listed as a Globally Secure Variety (T5); Secure (S5) in Ontario, Delaware, Georgia, New Jersey, New York, Virginia, and West Virginia; and, Vulnerable (S3) in Québec and Minnesota. S. pilosum var. pringlei also was listed as a Globally Secure Variety (T5); Secure (S5) in Delaware, New Jersey, and Virginia; Apparently Secure (S4) in Ontario and New York; Vulnerable (S3) in Minnesota; Imperiled (S2) in Québec and West Virginia; and, Critically Imperiled (S1) in Arkansas. The global statuses were last reviewed in 2016.

== Cultivation ==
Symphyotrichum pilosum var. pringlei and its cultivar 'Ochtendgloren' have both won the Royal Horticultural Society's Award of Garden Merit.
