= White heath aster =

White heath aster is a common name for several plants native to North America and may refer to:

- Symphyotrichum ericoides
- Symphyotrichum pilosum
