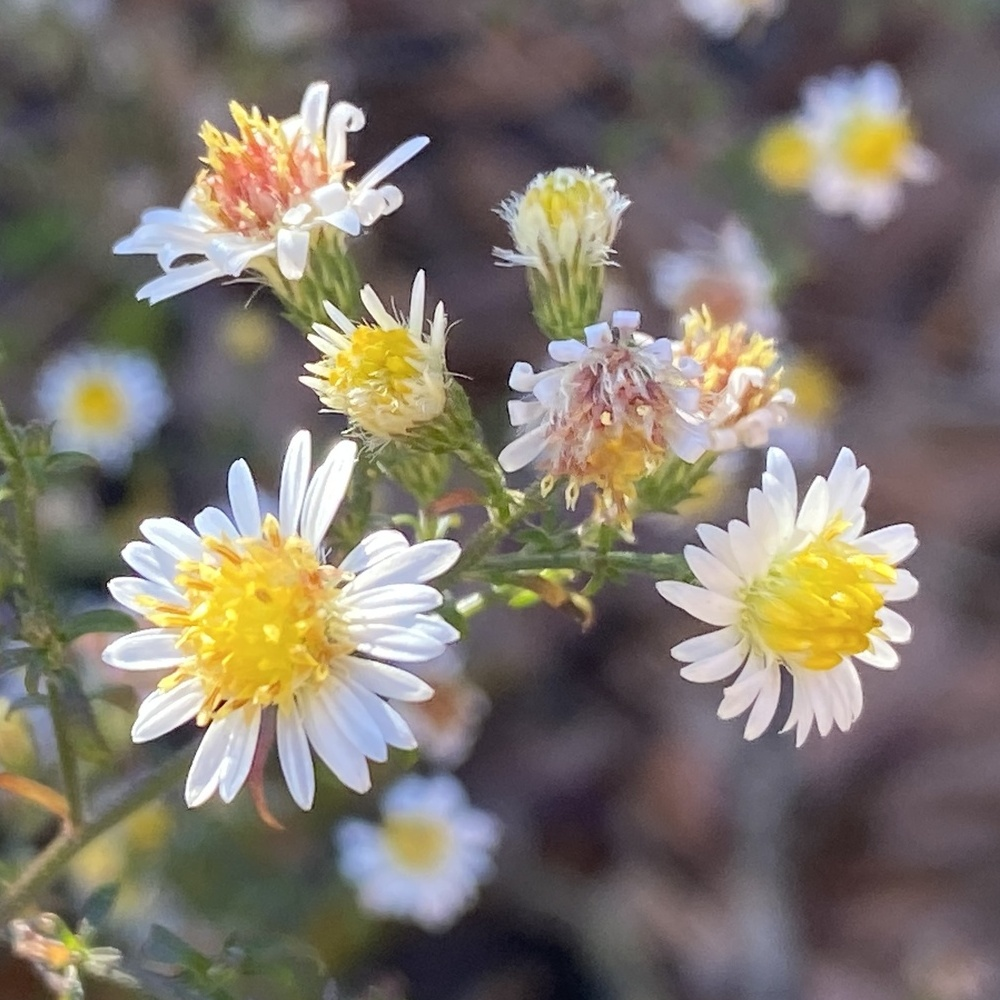

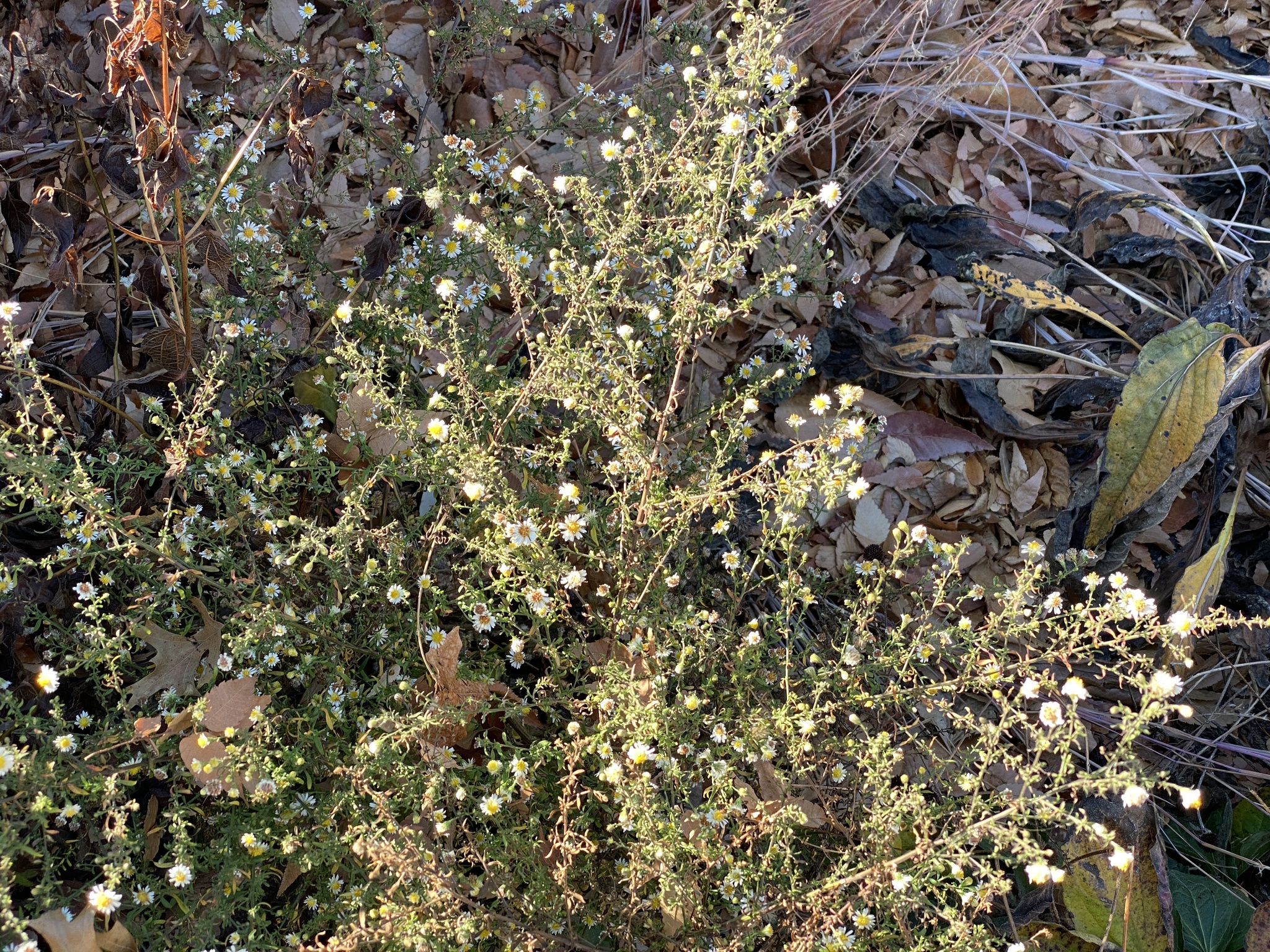
- S. parviceps, St. Charles County, Missouri

Conservation status
- Apparently Secure (NatureServe)

Scientific classification
- Kingdom: Plantae
- Clade: Tracheophytes
- Clade: Angiosperms
- Clade: Eudicots
- Clade: Asterids
- Order: Asterales
- Family: Asteraceae
- Tribe: Astereae
- Subtribe: Symphyotrichinae
- Genus: Symphyotrichum
- Subgenus: Symphyotrichum subg. Symphyotrichum
- Section: Symphyotrichum sect. Symphyotrichum
- Species: S. parviceps

Binomial name
- Symphyotrichum parviceps (E.S.Burgess) G.L.Nesom
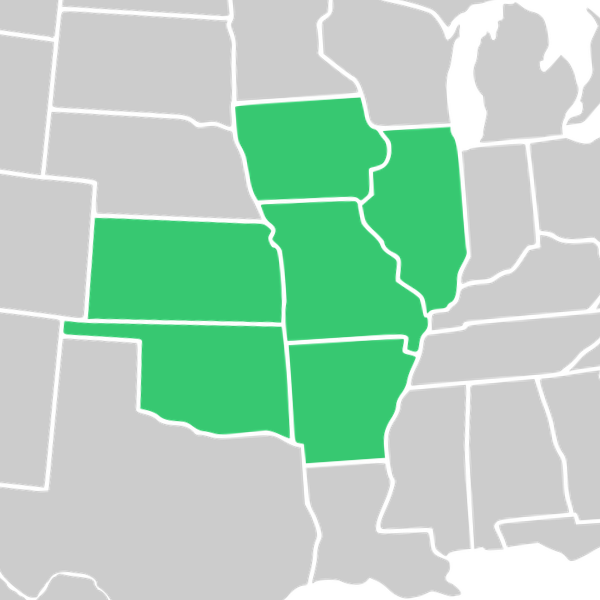
- Native distribution

Synonyms
- Aster depauperatus var. parviceps Fernald; Aster ericoides var. parviceps E.S.Burgess; Aster parviceps Mack. & Bush; Aster pilosus subsp. parviceps (E.S.Burgess) A.G.Jones

= Symphyotrichum parviceps =

Species of plant in the aster family

Symphyotrichum parviceps (formerly Aster parviceps) is a species of flowering plant in the family Asteraceae. It is native to the central United States, and it has the common names of smallhead aster and small white aster. A usually short-lived herbaceous perennial plant, it may reach 30 to 100 centimeters (1 to 3 1/4 feet) in height. Its flowers have white ray florets and pale yellow disk florets that turn purplish.

== Description ==
A usually short-lived herbaceous perennial plant, Symphyotrichum parviceps may reach 30 to 100 centimeters (1 to 3 1/4 feet) in height. Its flowers have white ray florets and pale yellow disk florets that turn purplish.

== Distribution and habitat ==
S. parviceps is native to Arkansas, Illinois, Iowa, Kansas, Missouri, and Oklahoma in the United States. It is found at elevations between 200 and 400 meters (700 and 1,300 feet) in open, dry areas with sandy and loamy soils. It has been introduced to the Transcaucasus.

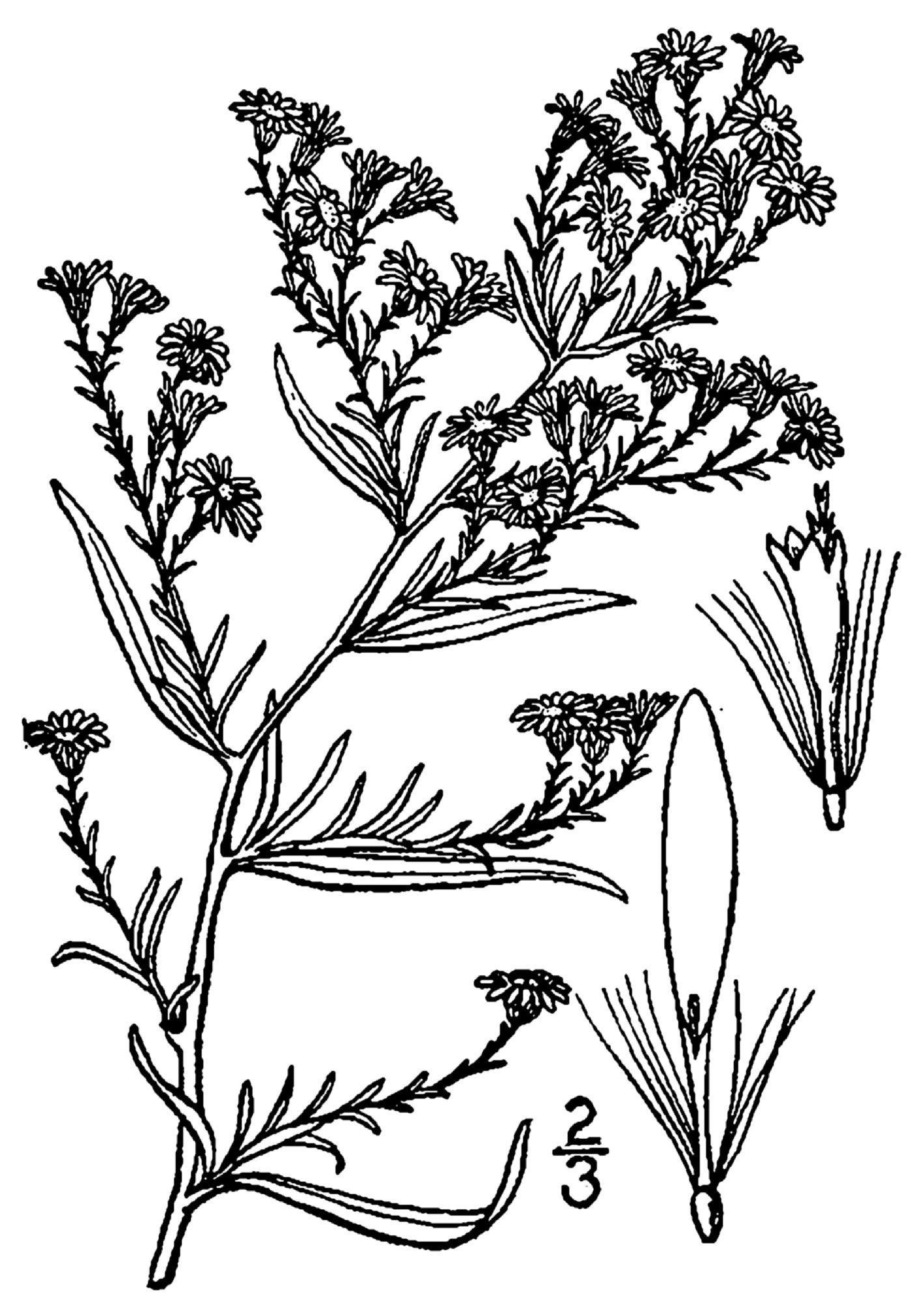
Botanical illustration of Aster parviceps from Britton and Brown (1913) An Illustrated Flora of the Northern United States, Canada and the British Possessions

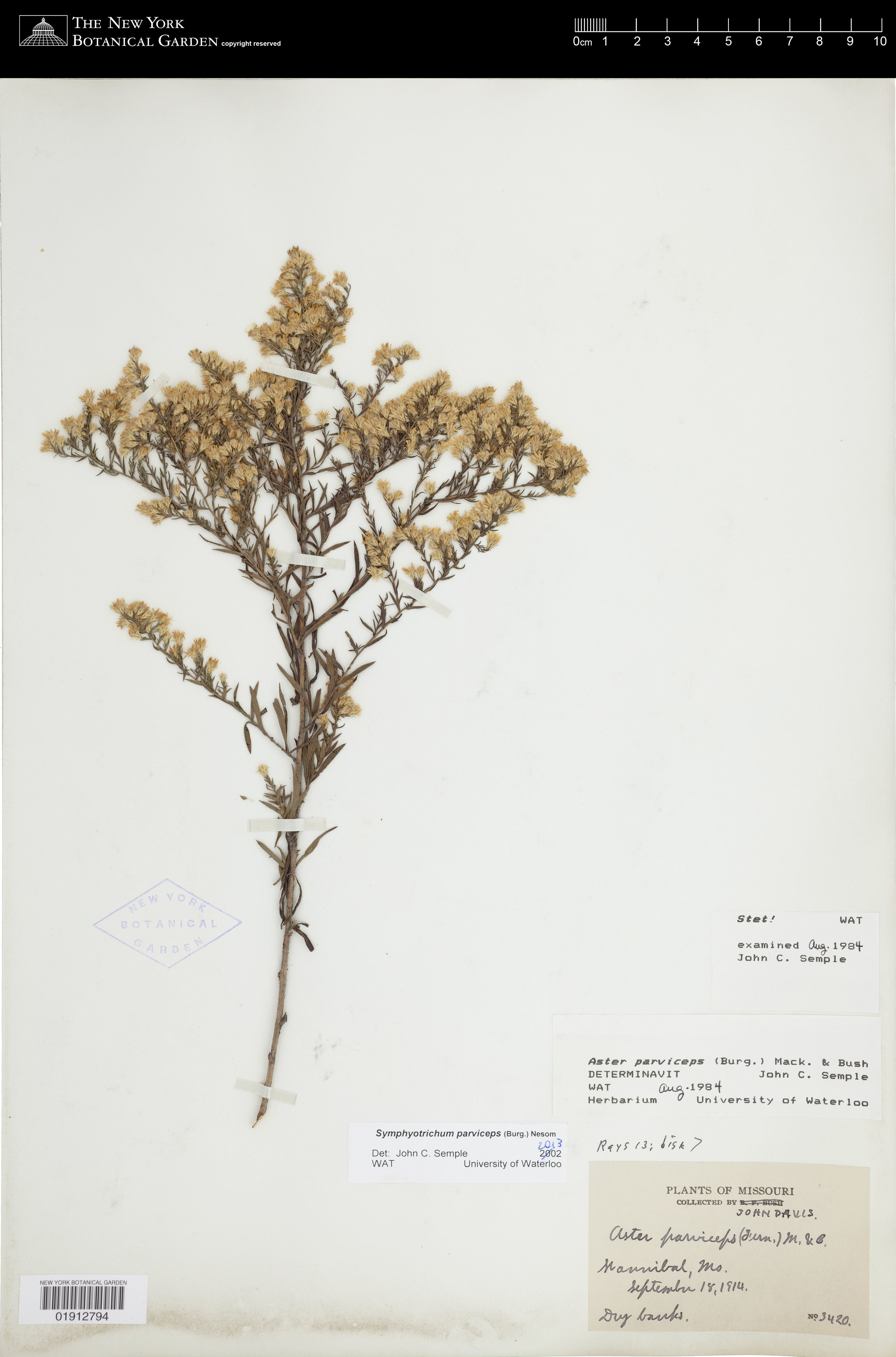
Herbarium specimen of Aster parviceps collected 18 September 1914 by John Davis at Hannibal, Missouri. It is stored at the New York Botanical Garden Steere Herbarium.

== Conservation ==
As of February 2023, NatureServe listed S. parviceps as Apparently Secure (G4) globally and Vulnerable (S3) in Illinois and Missouri. The species' global status was last reviewed on 29 April 1997.
