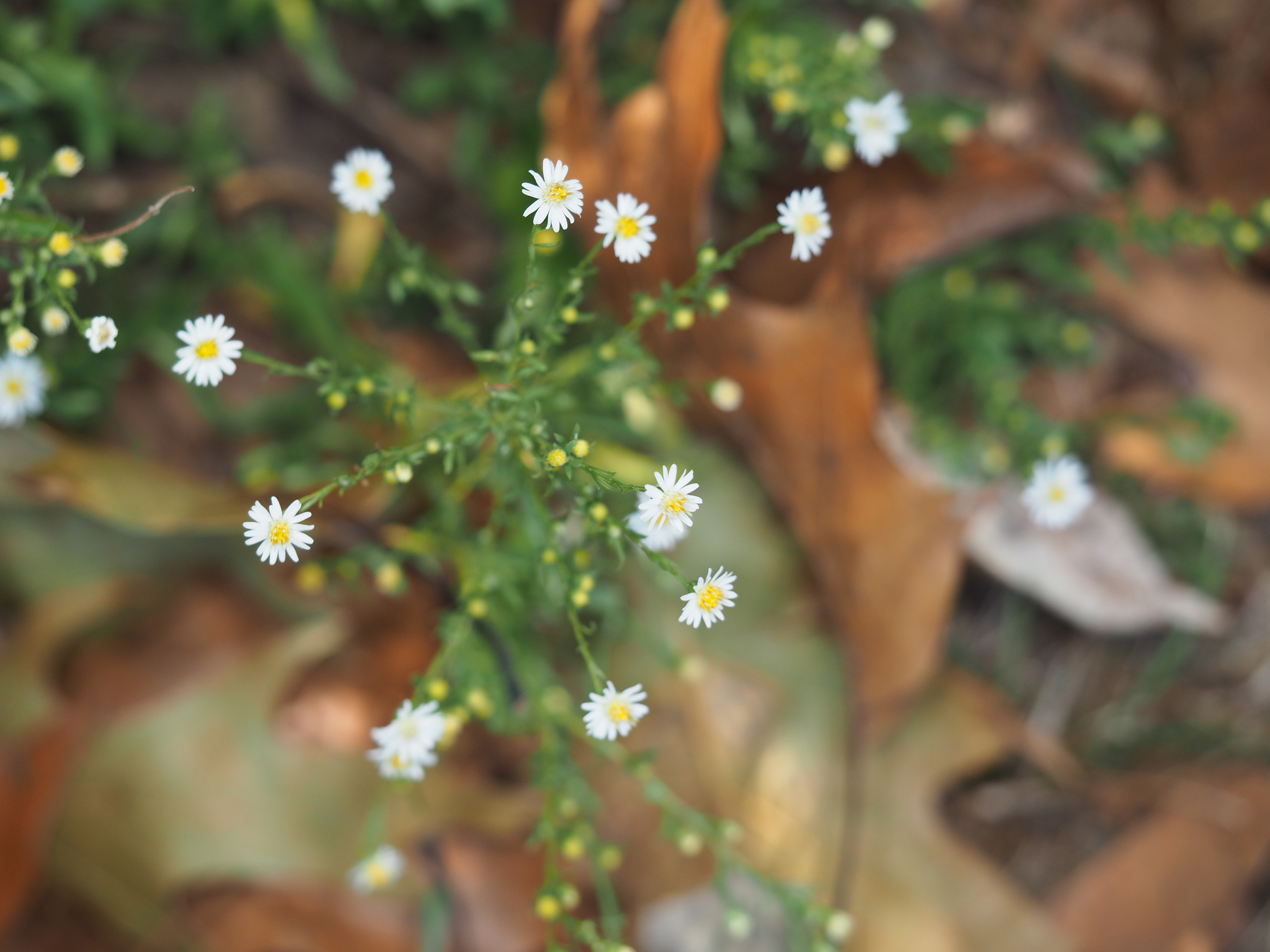

Conservation status
- Apparently Secure (NatureServe)

Scientific classification
- Kingdom: Plantae
- Clade: Tracheophytes
- Clade: Angiosperms
- Clade: Eudicots
- Clade: Asterids
- Order: Asterales
- Family: Asteraceae
- Tribe: Astereae
- Subtribe: Symphyotrichinae
- Genus: Symphyotrichum
- Subgenus: Symphyotrichum subg. Symphyotrichum
- Section: Symphyotrichum sect. Symphyotrichum
- Species: S. racemosum

Binomial name
- Symphyotrichum racemosum (Elliott) G.L.Nesom
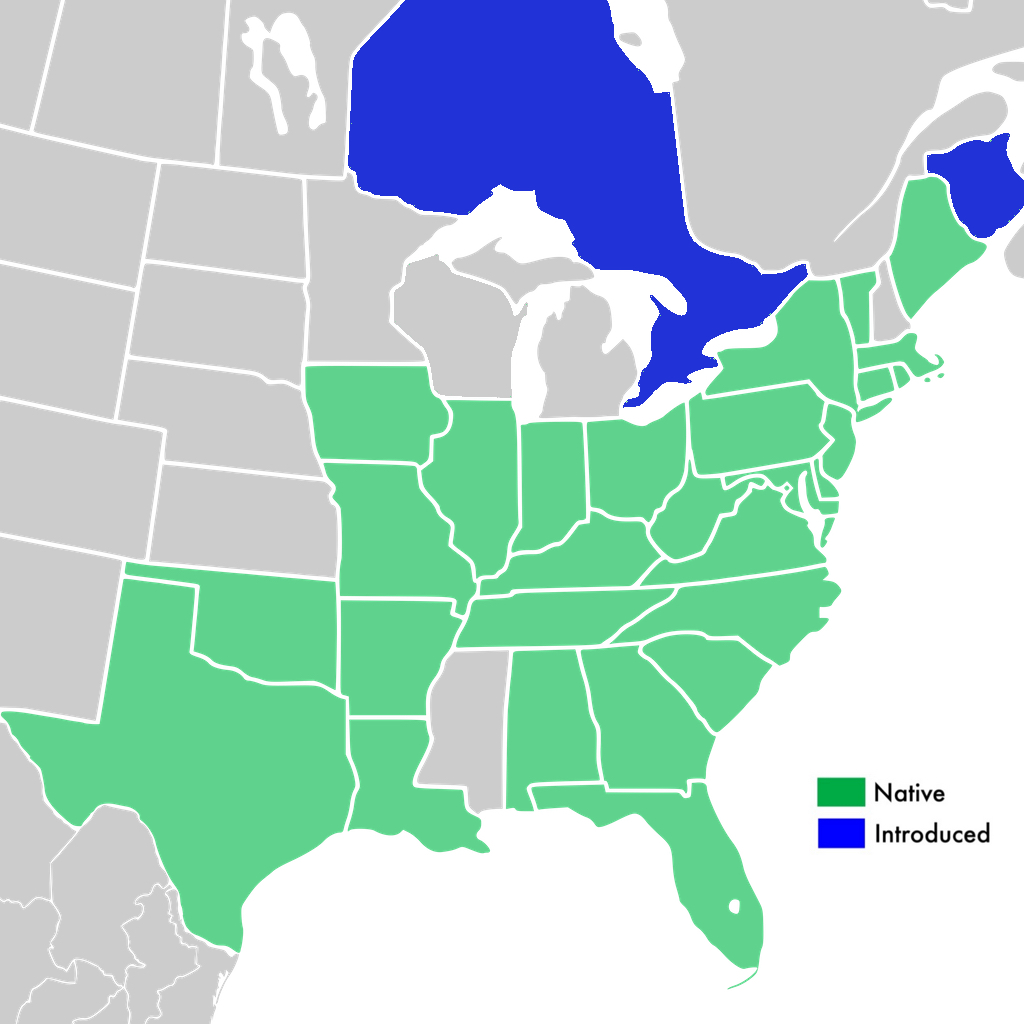
- Native (green) and introduced (blue) distribution

Synonyms
- Basionym: Aster racemosus Elliott; Alphabetical list: Anactis glabra Raf.; Aster brachypholis Small; Aster foliolosus Aiton; Aster fragilis Nees; Aster fragilis var. brachypholis (Small) A.G.Jones; Aster fragilis var. subdumosus (Wiegand) A.G.Jones; Aster fragilis var. subinteger DC.; Aster fragilis var. tenuiculus (W.P.C.Barton) W.P.C.Barton; Aster glaber E.Mey. ex Nees; Aster multiflorus Nutt.; Aster secundiflorus Desf.; Aster tenuiculus W.P.C.Barton; Aster tenuifolius Elliott; Aster vimineus Lam.; Aster vimineus var. foliolosus (Aiton) A.Gray; Aster vimineus var. subdumosus Wiegand; Leiachenis foliolosus Raf.; Symphyotrichum racemosum var. subdumosum (Wiegand) G.L.Nesom

= Symphyotrichum racemosum =

Species of flowering plant

Symphyotrichum racemosum (formerly Aster racemosus) is a species of flowering plant native to parts of the United States and introduced in Canada. It is known as smooth white oldfield aster and small white aster. It is a perennial, herbaceous plant in the family Asteraceae. It is a late-summer and fall blooming flower.

== Description ==
Symphyotrichum racemosum is a perennial herbaceous plant that reaches 30–90 centimeters (12–35 inches) (rarely to 100 cm (39 in)). It can grow in clumps with woody caudices or form colonies if its root system has developed long rhizomes. There are usually from one to three (1–3) upright glabrous (hairless) or glabrate (almost hairless) stems growing from the root base. If glabrate, the hair will be in vertical lines.

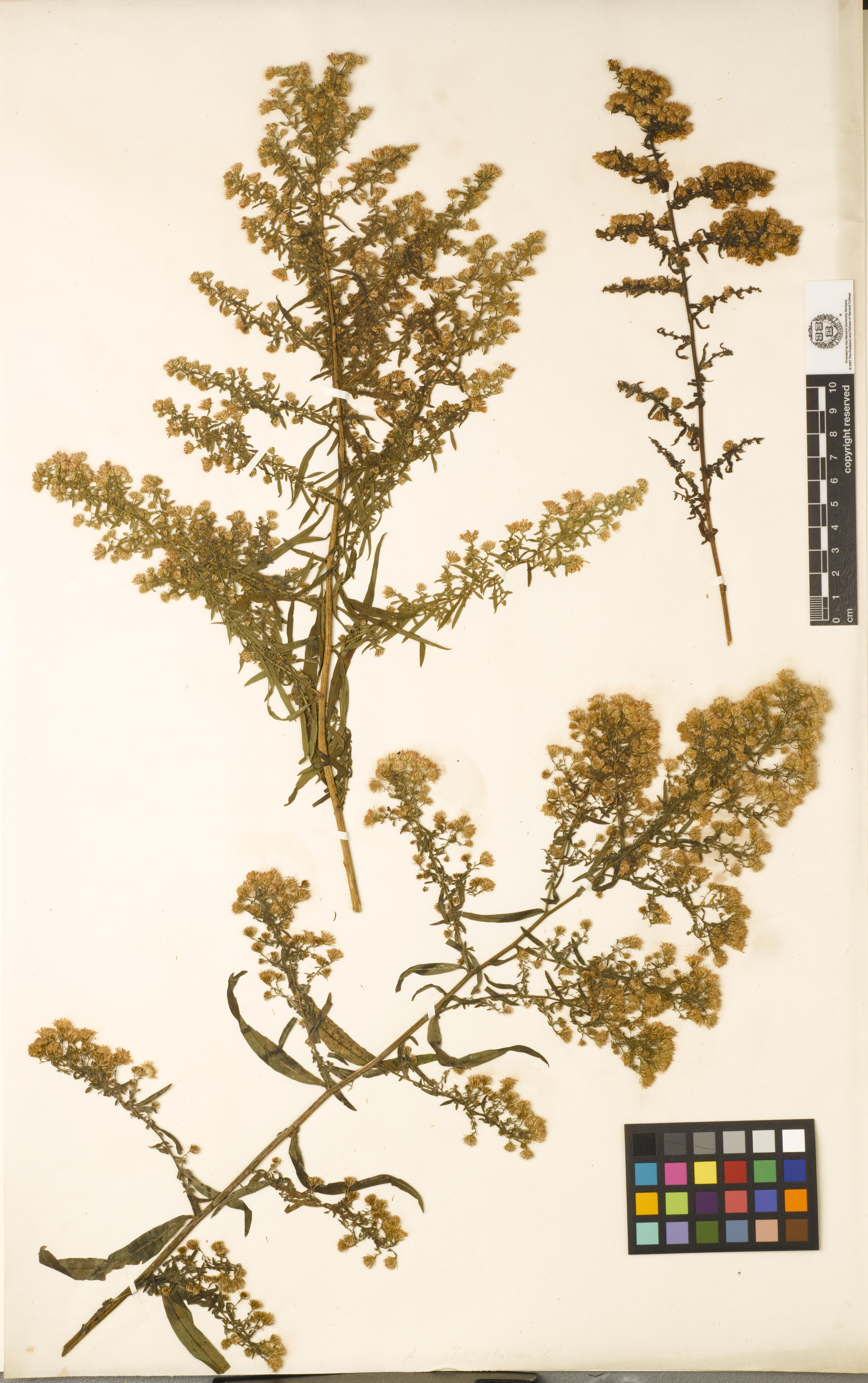
Symphyotrichum racemosum Harvard University Herbaria specimen

=== Leaves ===
The alternate and simple leaves of Symphyotrichum racemosum are thin, slightly rough to the touch (scabrous), and their edges are rolled downward (called revolute). They are various sizes depending on their locations on the stems and branches. The leaf faces are glabrous, or possibly have slight hair on the abaxial face (underside). Often in the axils where the leaves meet the stem are clusters of smaller leaves. Basal (bottom) and proximal cauline (stem) leaves are usually withering by the time the plant is flowering.

The basal leaves are spatulate to oblanceolate in shape with sizes ranging 0.5–4 cm long by 0.5–1.5 cm wide. They have sheathed petioles with narrow wings, and their margins (edges) are crenate to serrate.

The proximal cauline leaves are in some form of elliptic to lanceolate shape, 2–7 cm long by 0.3–2 cm wide, and sessile or petioled with wings. The proximalmost leaves are often subpetiolate (with an extremely short petiole). Cauline leaves become progressively smaller the further away from the base they grow. Petioles have clasping bases and a sparse number of long cilia or are strigose.

Distal leaves are usually sessile, but also sometimes have tiny petioles (subpetiolate). They are linear-lanceolate to linear in shape, 0.5–6 cm long by 1–8 mm wide, and unequal in size. They get smaller the further from the base they grow, abruptly so on the inflorescence branches. Their bases are cuneate to attenuate, and their margins are serrulate or entire.

=== Flowers ===
Symphyotrichum racemosum is a late-summer and fall blooming perennial, with flower heads opening as early as August and as late as October. Flower heads grow in spread out racemose, or sometimes pyramidal, paniculiform arrays, horizontally spreading or arching, and are often crowded together. They tend to cluster along one side of each branch.

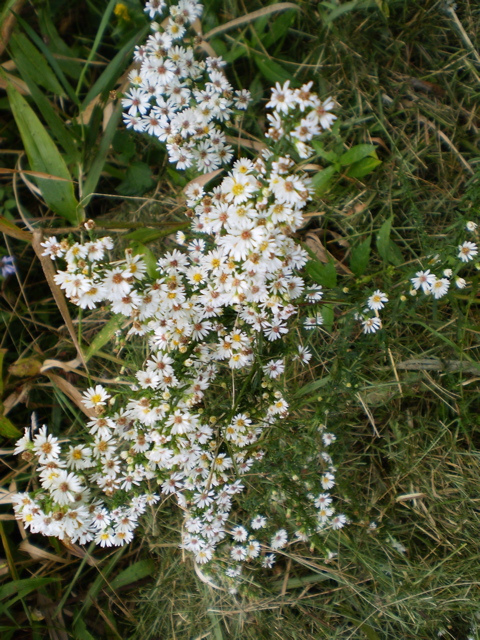
Large Symphyotrichum racemosum inflorescence

Each flower head is about 13 millimeters (1/2 inch) in diameter and has its own slender peduncle which can be anywhere from 2 mm to over 3 cm long. The peduncles look like skinny branches (they technically are). They are hairy in vertical lines and have 5–15 bracts that are linear-elliptic to acicular in shape and very small, only 1–2 mm in length. These bracts are glabrous, and they grade into the phyllaries.

At the base of the head and surrounding the unopened flowers of all members of the family Asteraceae is a bundle of sepal-like bracts or scales called phyllaries, which together form the involucre that protects the individual flowers in the head before they open. The involucres of Symphyotrichum racemosum are shaped like cylinders and are usually 3.5–4.5 mm long (though they can be as short as 2.5 mm and as long as 5.5 mm).

The phyllaries are appressed or the outer ones may be spreading. The shape of the outer phyllaries is oblong-lanceolate, and the inner phyllaries are linear. They are in 4–6 unequal rows, meaning they are staggered and do not end at the same point, and they are glabrous (with no hairs). The margins of each phyllary may appear white or light green, but are translucent. The phyllaries have green zones (chlorophyllous zones) that are oblanceolate to linear-oblanceolate and sometimes lightly purple-tinged.

Each flower head is made up of ray florets (petals) and disk florets (disks are the flower centers). There are 16–20 ray florets (sometimes as few as 12) which are usually white, but may rarely be pink. The ray florets are 5–8 mm long and 0.5–1.2 mm wide. Ray florets in the Symphyotrichum genus are exclusively female, each having a pistil (with style, stigma, and ovary), but no stamen. Thus, ray florets accept pollen and each can develop a seed, but they produce no pollen.

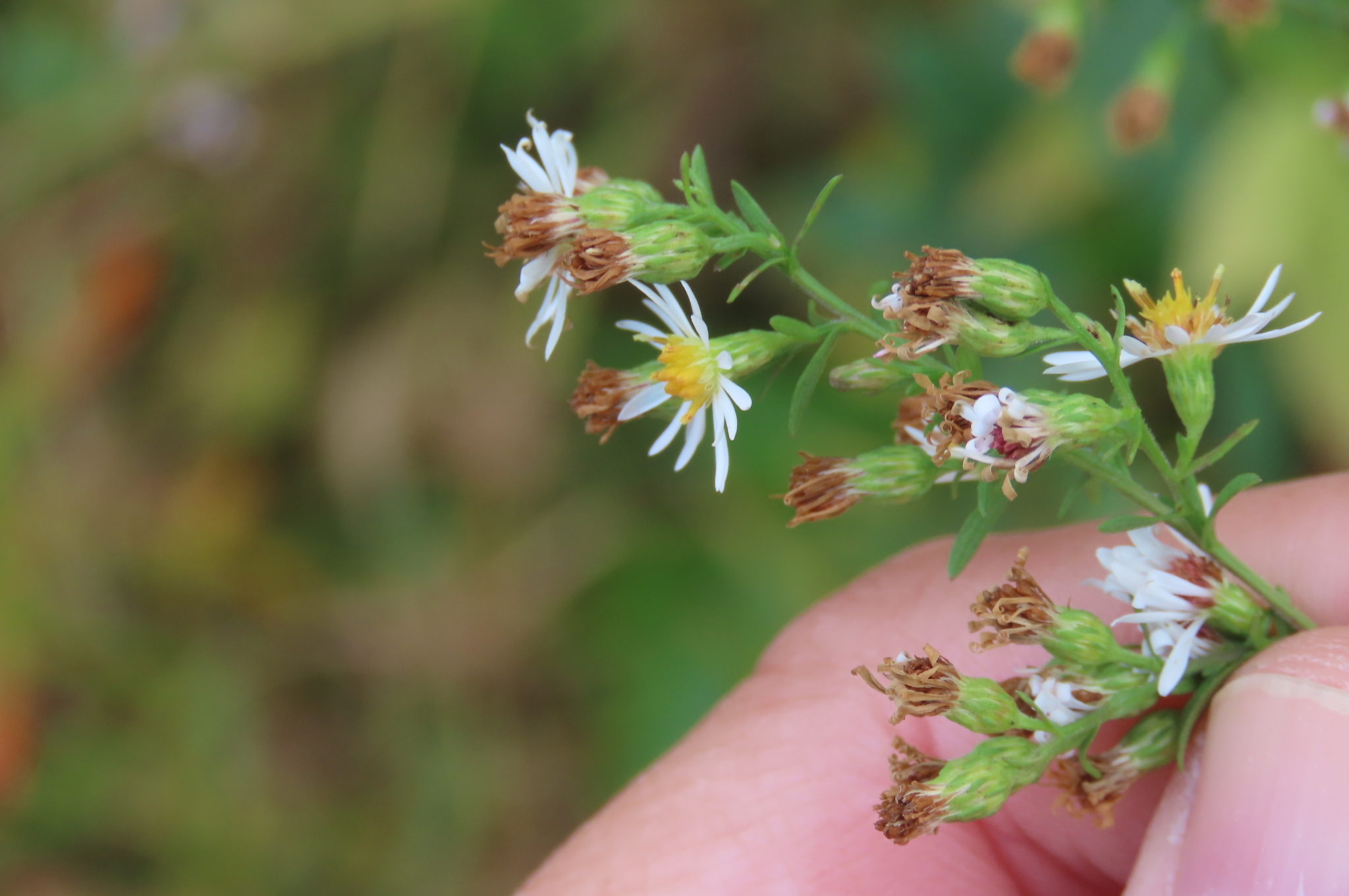

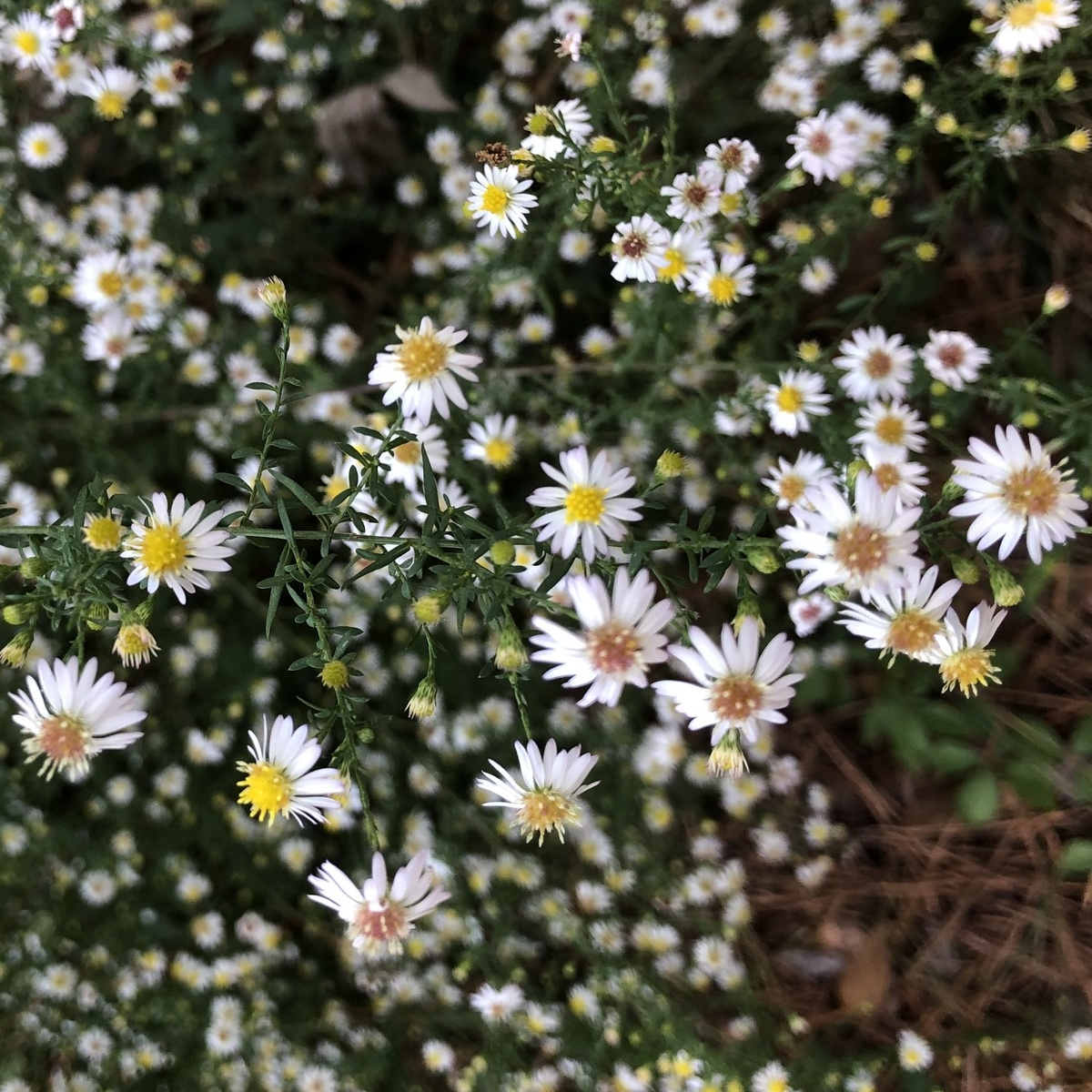

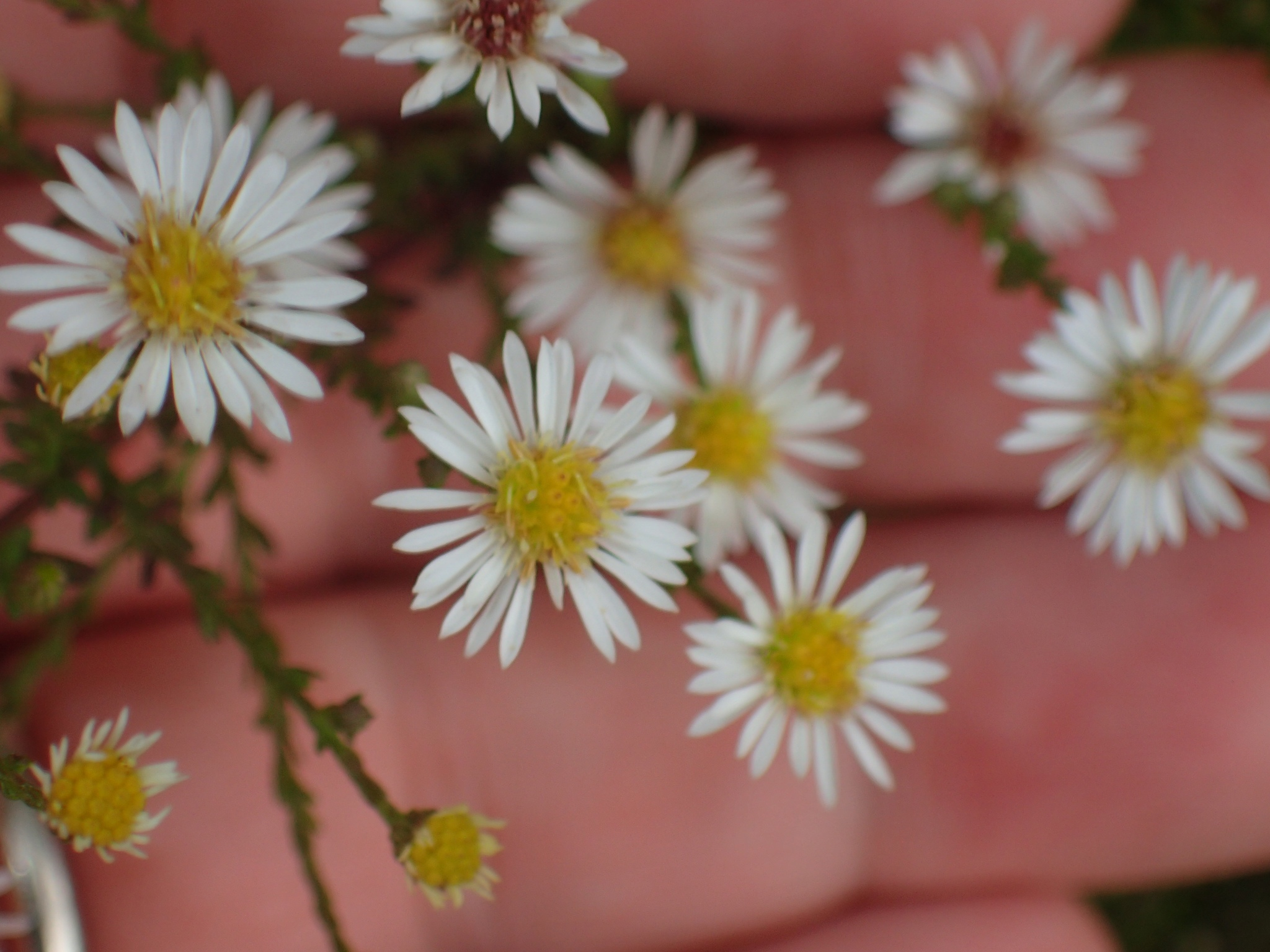

The disks have 10–20 (sometimes as many as 25) florets that start out as cream or pale yellow and once opened, may turn pink or red after pollination. Each disk floret is made up of 5 petals, collectively a corolla, which open into 5 lanceolate lobes that are recurved to upright. Disk florets in the Symphyotrichum genus are androgynous, each with both male (stamen, anthers, and filaments) and female reproductive parts. Thus, a disk floret produces pollen and can develop a seed.

=== Fruit ===
The fruits (seeds) of Symphyotrichum racemosum are not true achenes, but are cypselae, resembling an achene and surrounded by a calyx sheath. This is true for all members of the Asteraceae family. After pollination, they mature and become gray or tan with an obovoid shape (like an egg), 1–1.8 mm long with 4–5 faint nerves, and sparsely strigillose (with a few stiff, slender bristles) or sericeous (silky-looking) on their surface. They also have pappi (tufts of hairs) which are white in color and 2.5–3.5 mm long.

=== Chromosomes ===
Symphyotrichum racemosum has a base number of x = 8 and a diploid chromosome count of 2n = 16.

== Taxonomy ==
Symphyotrichum racemosum is one of the "bushy asters and relatives" within Symphyotrichum subsection Dumosi. It was first formally described in 1823 by Stephen Elliott and named Aster racemosus. However, this broad circumscription of the genus Aster was polyphyletic, and the North American asters are now mostly classified in Symphyotrichum and several other genera.

== Distribution and habitat ==
S. racemosum is native to most of the eastern and east-central United States and has been introduced in Canada. It generally grows at elevations between 0 and 200 meters (0 and 656 feet). It is a wetland species found in alluvial soils, brackish marshes, savannas, and bogs. It is known from wet meadows, swamps and swamp borders, and prairie swales. Other habitats include those on open coastal pond shores.

== Conservation ==
NatureServe lists it as Apparently Secure (G4) worldwide and Critically Imperiled (S1) in Oklahoma, Imperiled (S2) in Vermont and New Brunswick, and Vulnerable (S3) in Pennsylvania. The Database of Vascular Plants of Canada (VASCAN), however, reports that it is an introduced species in New Brunswick. Flora of North America reports it as introduced in Canada.
