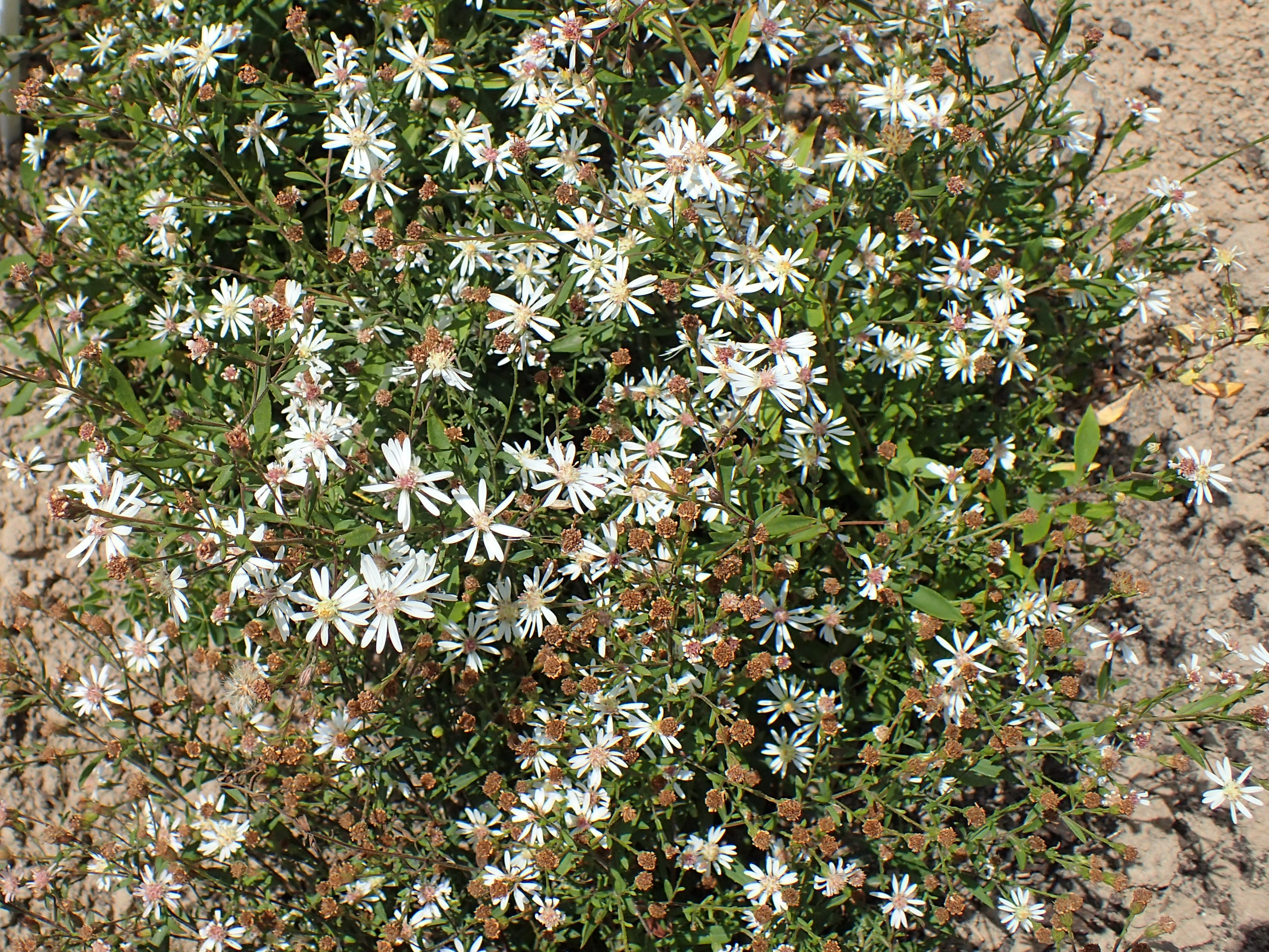

Conservation status
- Apparently Secure (NatureServe)

Scientific classification
- Kingdom: Plantae
- Clade: Tracheophytes
- Clade: Angiosperms
- Clade: Eudicots
- Clade: Asterids
- Order: Asterales
- Family: Asteraceae
- Subtribe: Symphyotrichinae
- Genus: Symphyotrichum
- Subgenus: Symphyotrichum subg. Symphyotrichum
- Section: Symphyotrichum sect. Symphyotrichum
- Species: S. tradescantii

Binomial name
- Symphyotrichum tradescantii (L.) G.L.Nesom
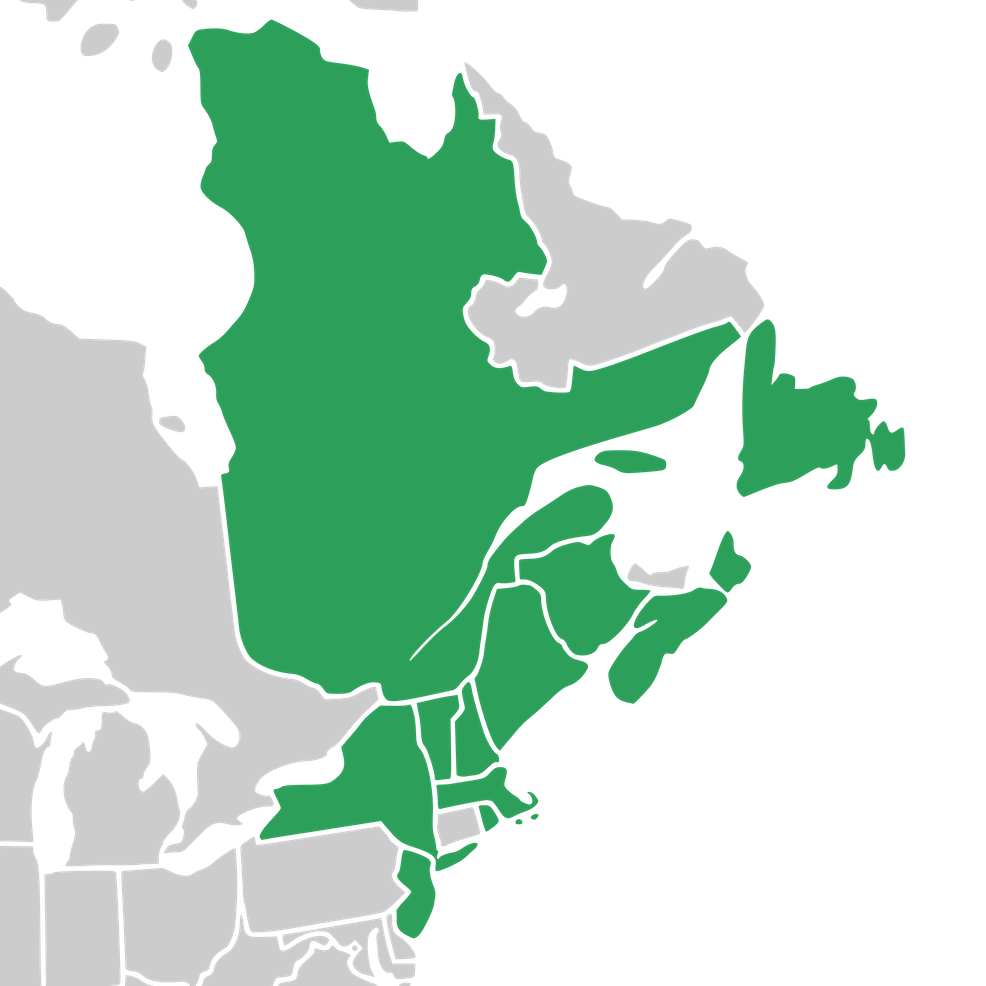
- Native distribution

Synonyms
- Basionym: Aster tradescantii L.; Alphabetical list: Aster artemisiiflorus Poir.; Aster dumosus var. strictior Torr. & A.Gray; Aster fragilis Willd.; Aster leucanthemus Desf.; Aster miser Dryand. ex Aiton; Aster parviflorus Nees; Aster recurvatus Pursh; Aster saxatilis (Fernald) Blanch.; Aster tradescantii var. saxatilis (Fernald) House; Aster vimineus var. saxatilis Fernald

= Symphyotrichum tradescantii =

Species of plant in the aster family

Symphyotrichum tradescantii (formerly Aster tradescantii) is a species of flowering plant in the family Asteraceae native to northeastern North America. Common names include Tradescant's aster and shore aster.

== Description ==
Symphyotrichum tradescantii is a perennial, herbaceous plant that may reach 5 to 70 centimeters (2 to 28 inches) tall. Its flowers have white ray florets and pale yellow to purple disk florets.

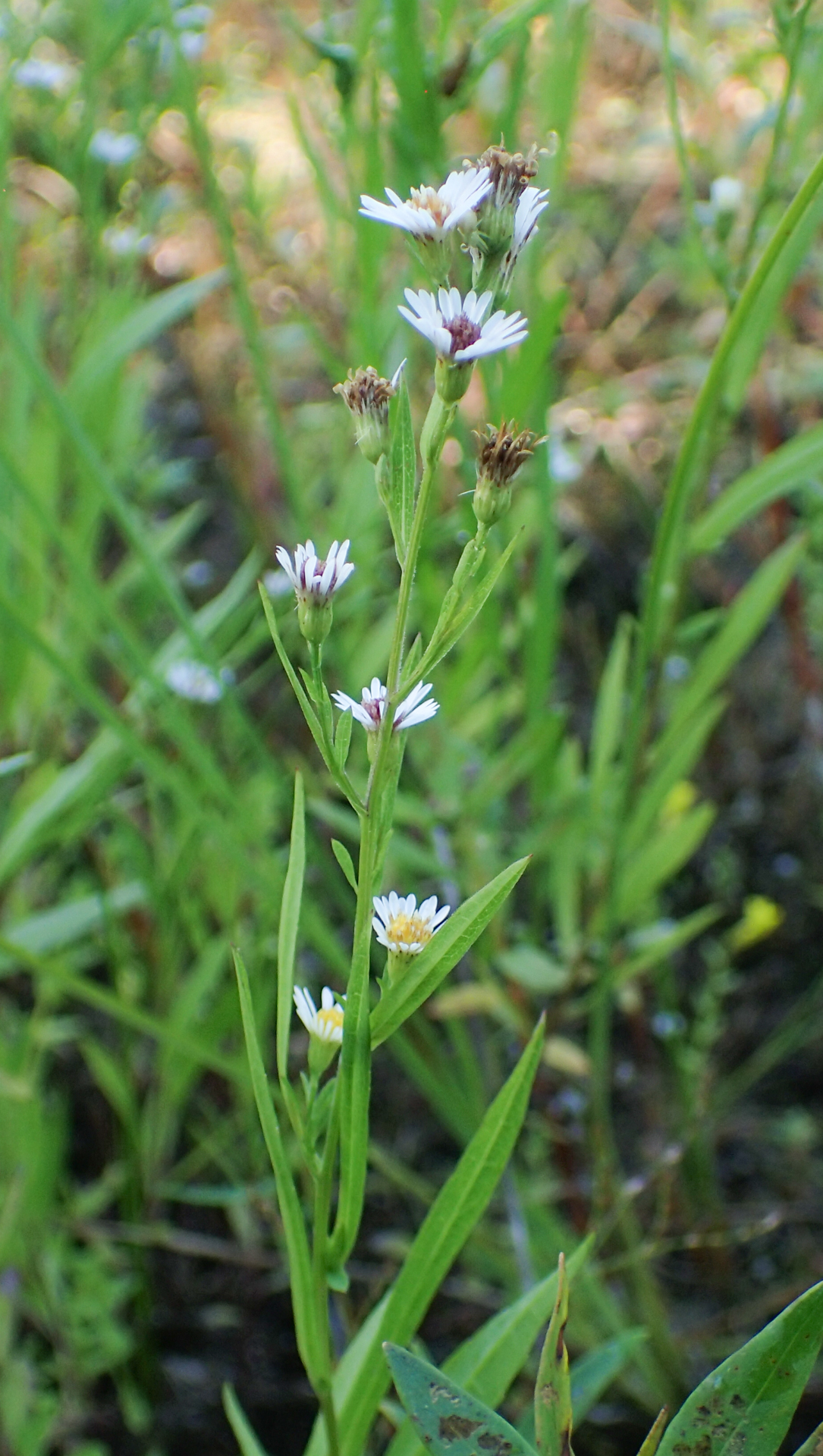

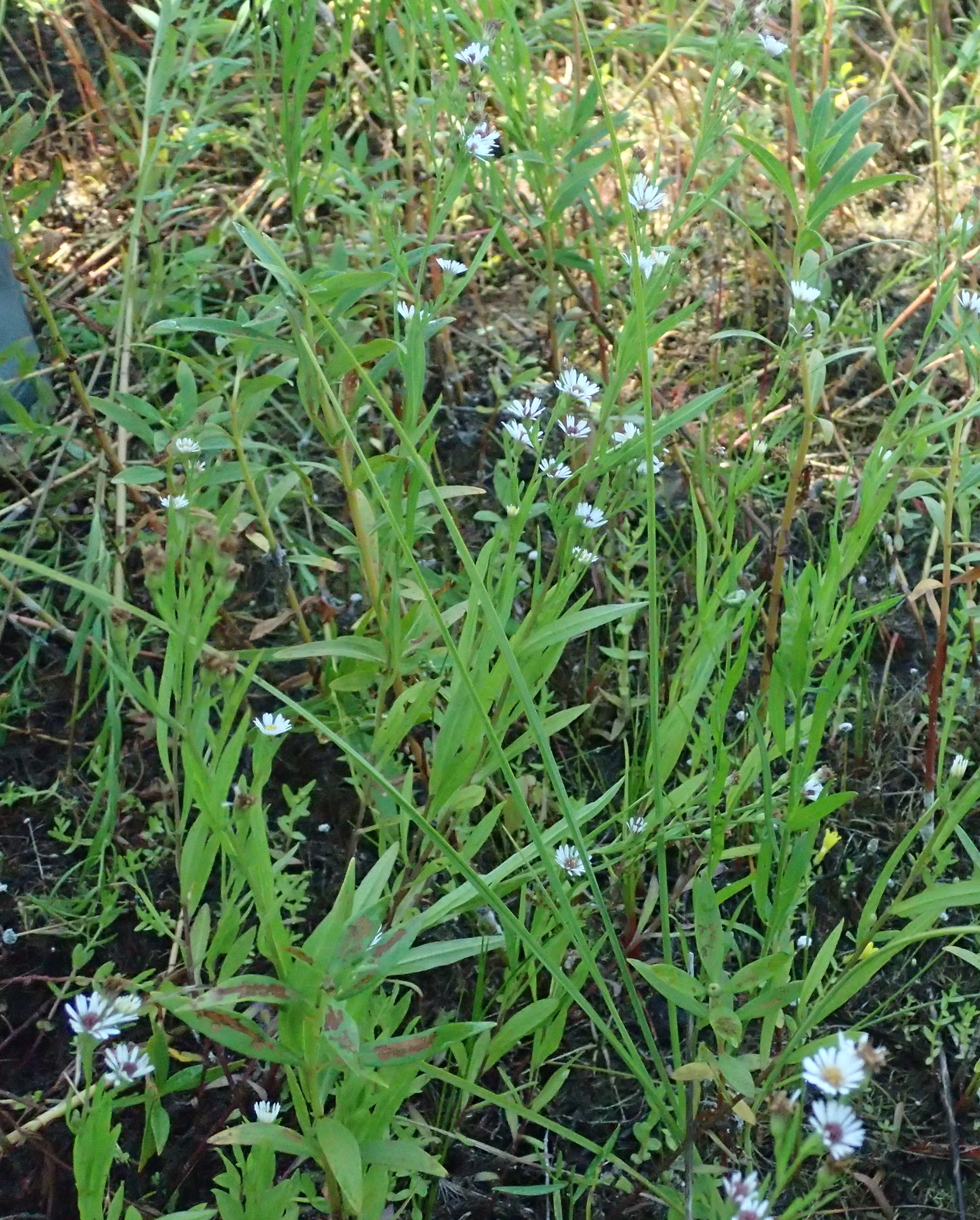

== Distribution and habitat ==
=== Native ===
Symphyotrichum tradescantii is native to northeastern North America in Canada (New Brunswick, Newfoundland, Nova Scotia, and Québec) and the United States (Maine, Massachusetts, New Hampshire, New Jersey, New York, Rhode Island, and Vermont).

=== Introduced ===
It is an introduced species in the Czech Republic, Slovakia, Slovenia, and Croatia.

=== Habitat ===
S. tradescantii is found in wet and rocky habitats such as shores, streams, and freshwater estuaries.
