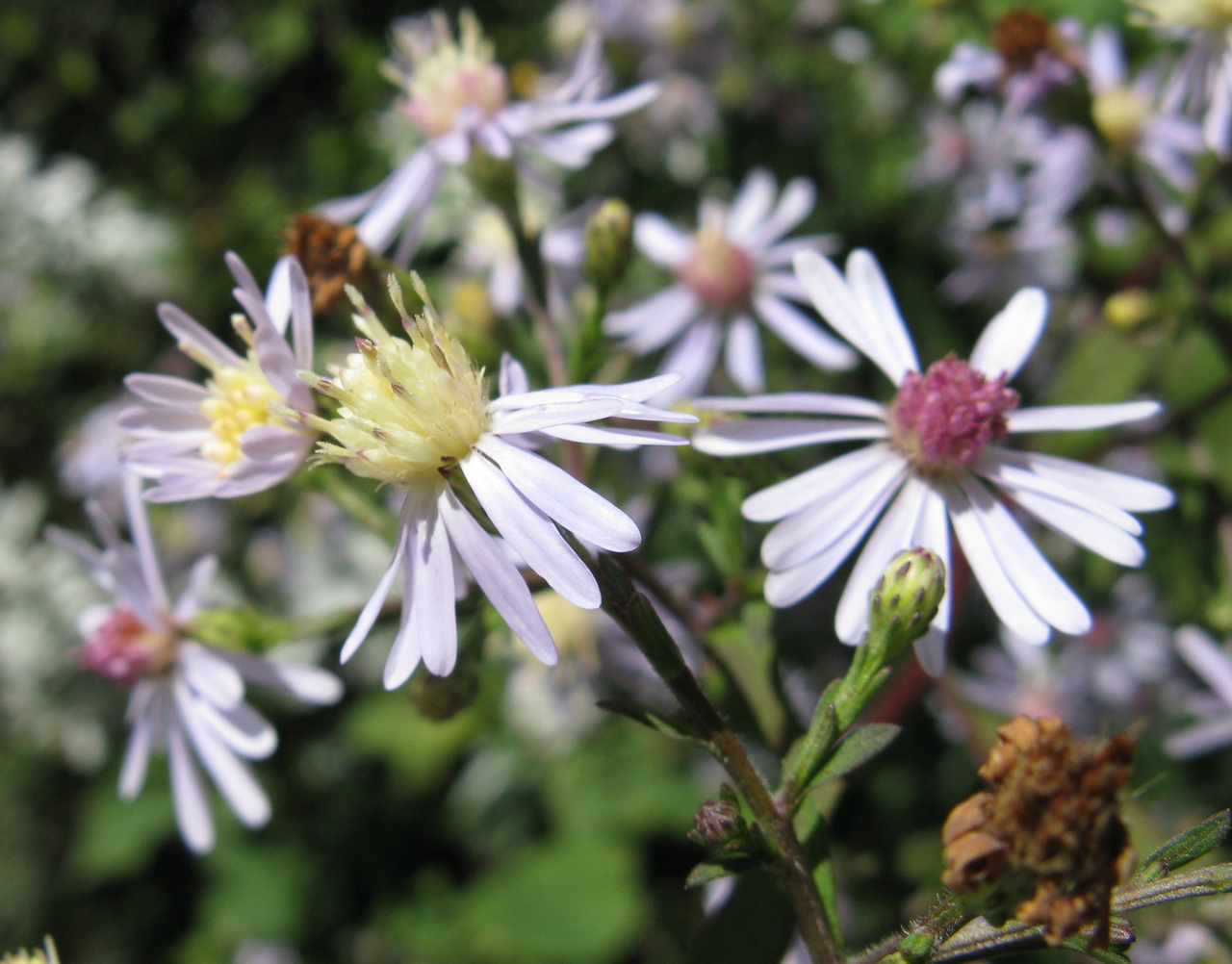
- Heartleaf aster

Conservation status
- Secure (NatureServe)

Scientific classification
- Kingdom: Plantae
- Clade: Tracheophytes
- Clade: Angiosperms
- Clade: Eudicots
- Clade: Asterids
- Order: Asterales
- Family: Asteraceae
- Genus: Symphyotrichum
- Subgenus: Symphyotrichum subg. Symphyotrichum
- Section: Symphyotrichum sect. Symphyotrichum
- Species: S. cordifolium

Binomial name
- Symphyotrichum cordifolium (L.) G.L.Nesom
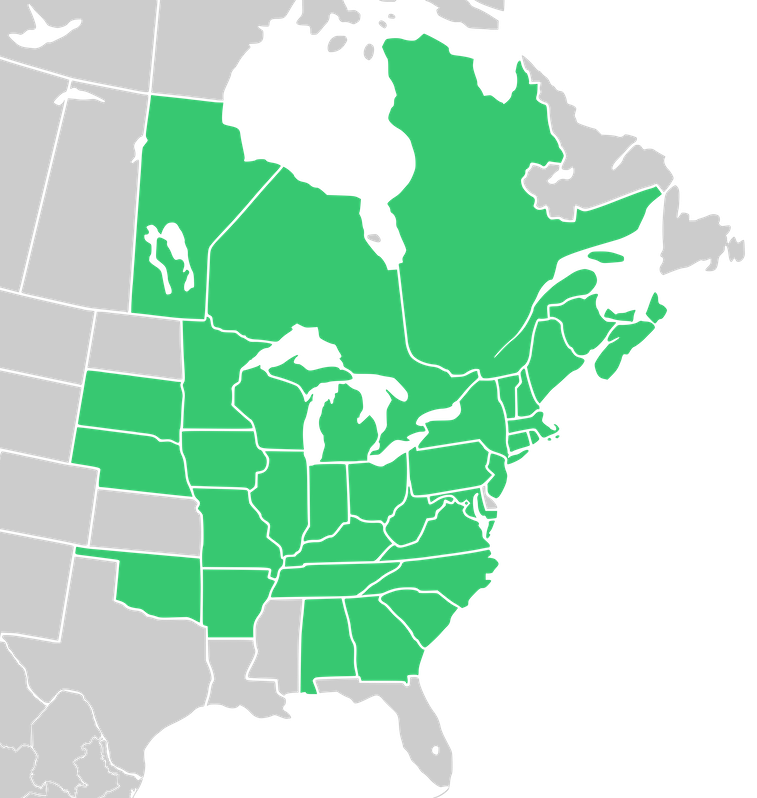
- Native distribution

Synonyms
- Basionym: Aster cordifolius L.; Alphabetical list: Aster cordifolius var. alvearius E.S.Burgess; Aster cordifolius var. furbishiae Fernald; Aster cordifolius var. glabratus Hollick & Britton; Aster cordifolius var. incisus Britton; Aster cordifolius var. laevigatus Porter; Aster cordifolius subsp. laevigatus (Porter) A.G.Jones; Aster cordifolius var. lanceolatus Porter; Aster cordifolius var. moratus Shinners; Aster cordifolius var. pedicellatus E.S.Burgess; Aster cordifolius var. polycephalus Porter; Aster cordifolius var. racemiflorus Fernald; Aster cordifolius var. sagittifolius (Willd.) A.G.Jones; Aster cordifolius subsp. sagittifolius (Wedem. ex Willd.) A.G.Jones; Aster finkii var. moratus Shinners; Aster heterophyllus Willd.; Aster heterophyllus var. glabriusculus DC.; Aster heterophyllus var. scaber DC.; Aster leiophyllus Porter; Aster leiophyllus var. incisus Porter; Aster leiophyllus var. lanceolatus Porter; Aster lowrieanus Porter; Aster lowrieanus var. bicknellii Porter; Aster lowrieanus var. incisus Porter; Aster lowrieanus var. lanceolatus Porter; Aster lowrieanus var. lancifolius Porter; Aster pallidulus B.Vogel; Aster plumarius E.S.Burgess; Aster pubescens Nees; Aster sagittifolius Wedem. ex Willd.; Aster sagittifolius f. albiflorus Moldenke; Leiachenis cordifolia Raf.; Solidago cordifolia Moench; Symphyotrichum cordifolium var. furbishiae (Fernald) G.L.Nesom; Symphyotrichum cordifolium var. lanceolatum (Porter) G.L.Nesom; Symphyotrichum cordifolium var. moratum (Shinners) G.L.Nesom; Symphyotrichum cordifolium var. polycephalum (Porter) G.L.Nesom; Symphyotrichum cordifolium var. racemiflorum (Fernald) G.L.Nesom; Symphyotrichum lowrieanum (Porter) G.L.Nesom; Symphyotrichum sagittifolium (Wedem. ex Willd.) G.L.Nesom

= Symphyotrichum cordifolium =

Species of plant in the aster family

Symphyotrichum cordifolium (formerly Aster cordifolius), commonly known as common blue wood aster, heartleaf aster, and blue wood-aster, is a perennial herbaceous flowering plant in the family Asteraceae native to central and eastern North America. It reaches heights of up to 1.2 meters (4 feet) and has bluish daisy-like flowers which bloom late-summer and fall in its range.

== Description ==
Symphyotrichum cordifolium reaches heights of up to 1.2 meters (4 feet). The lower leaves are heart-shaped, while leaves higher on the stem tend to be sessile with more rounded bases. The composite flowers, which have bluish to rarely white ray florets and light yellow disc florets that eventually turn purple, emerge in August and persist into October.

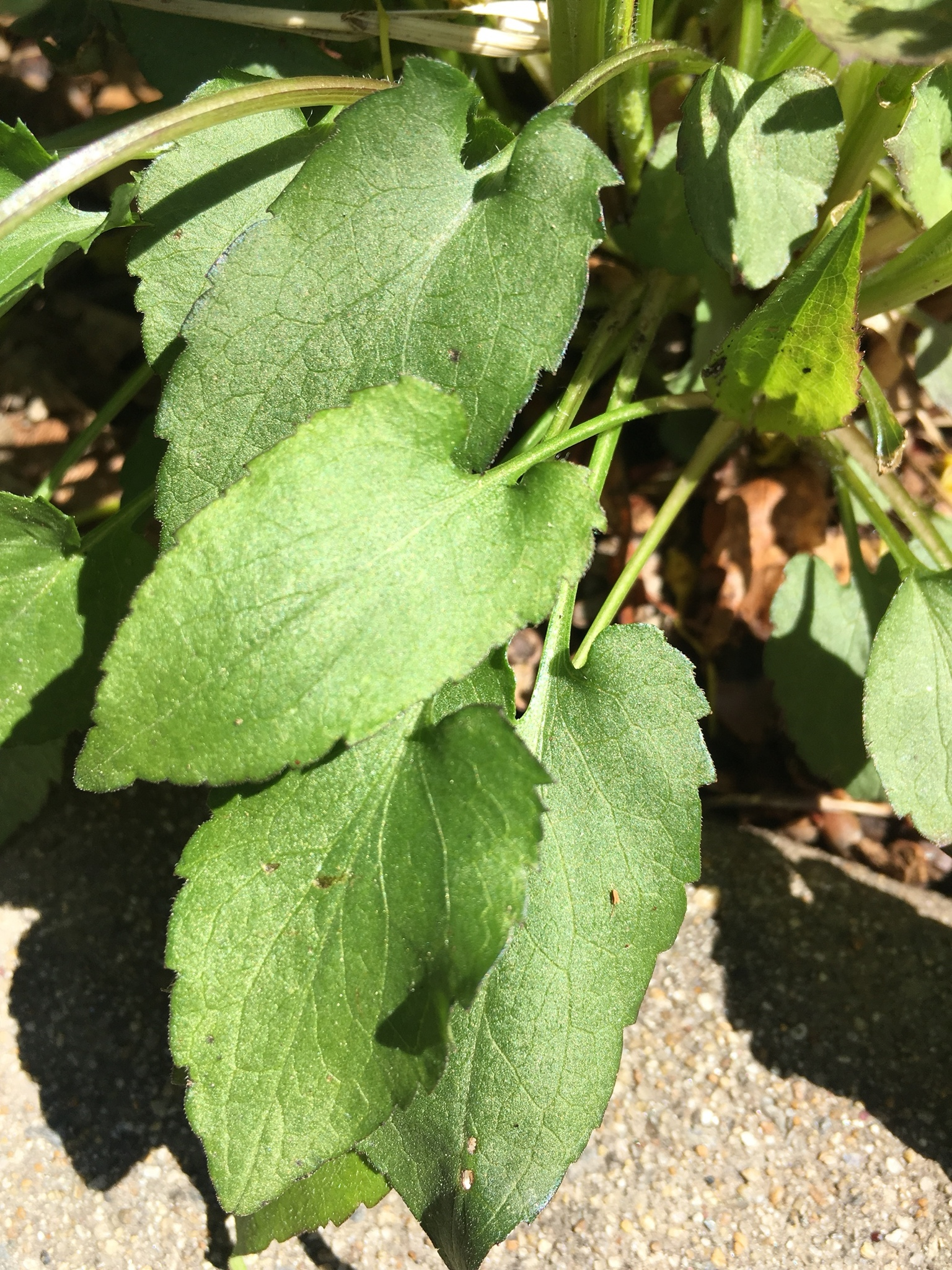
Symphyotrichum cordifolium leaves

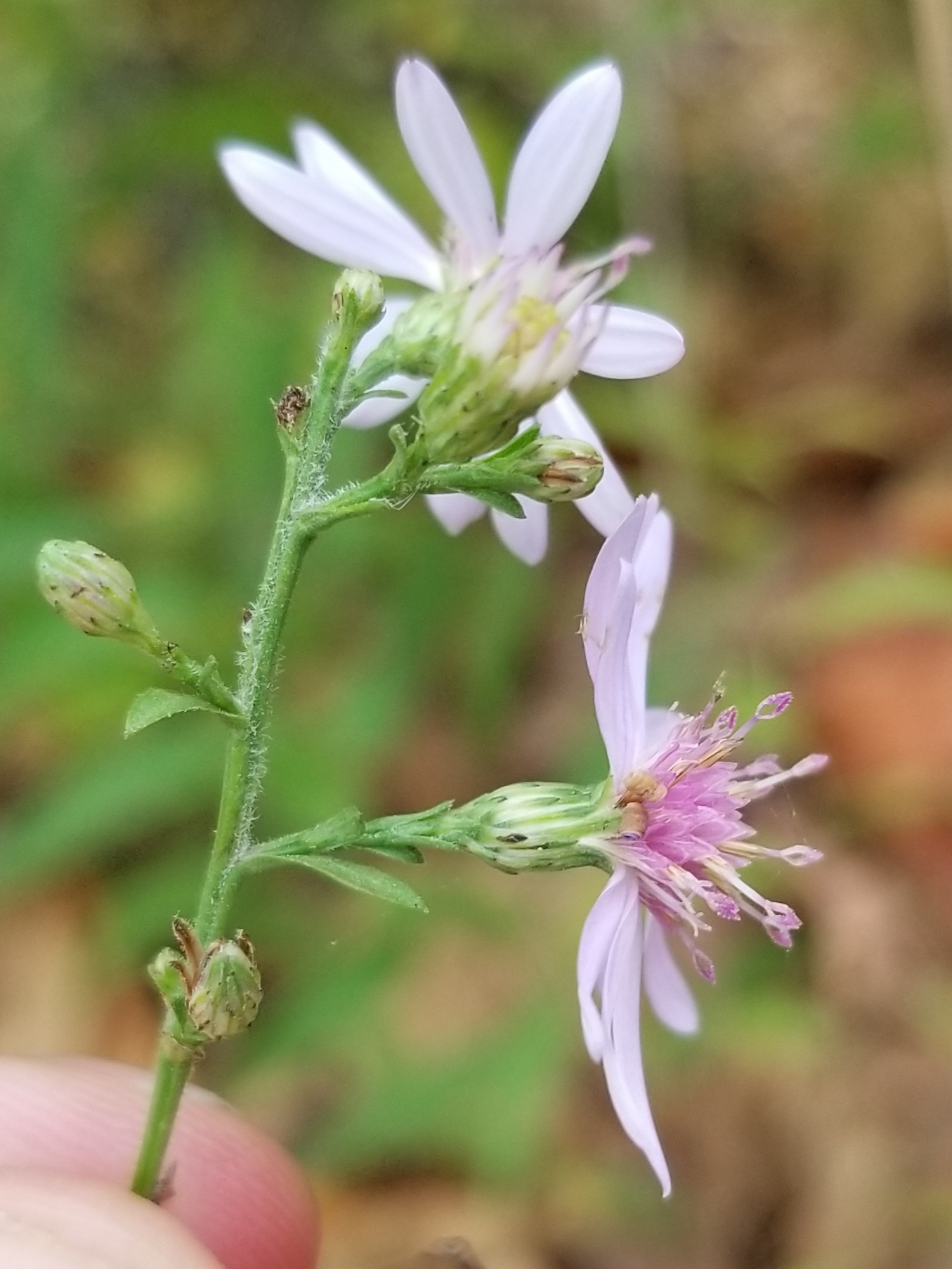
Flower heads showing involucres

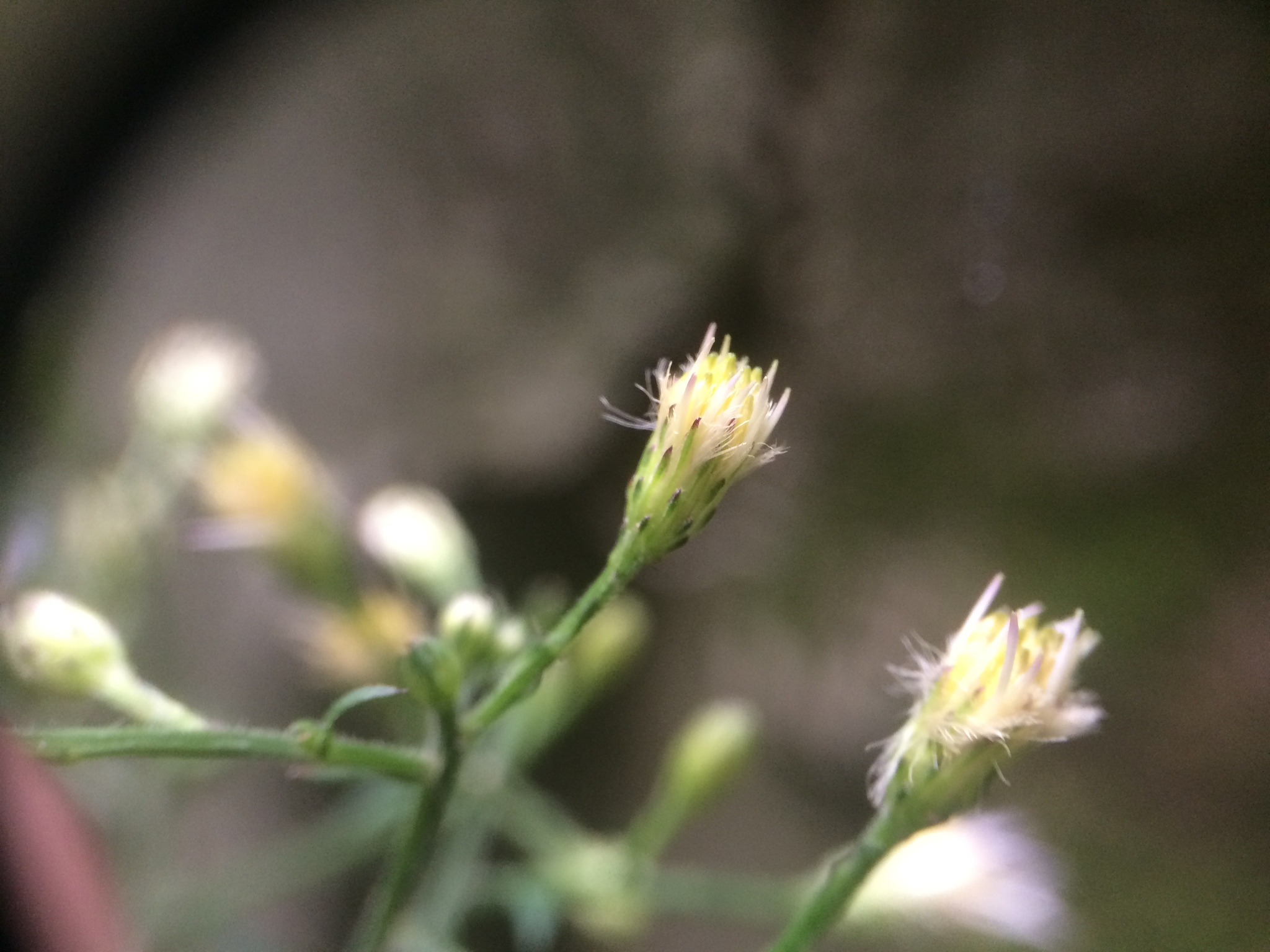
Close-up of an involucre showing phyllaries

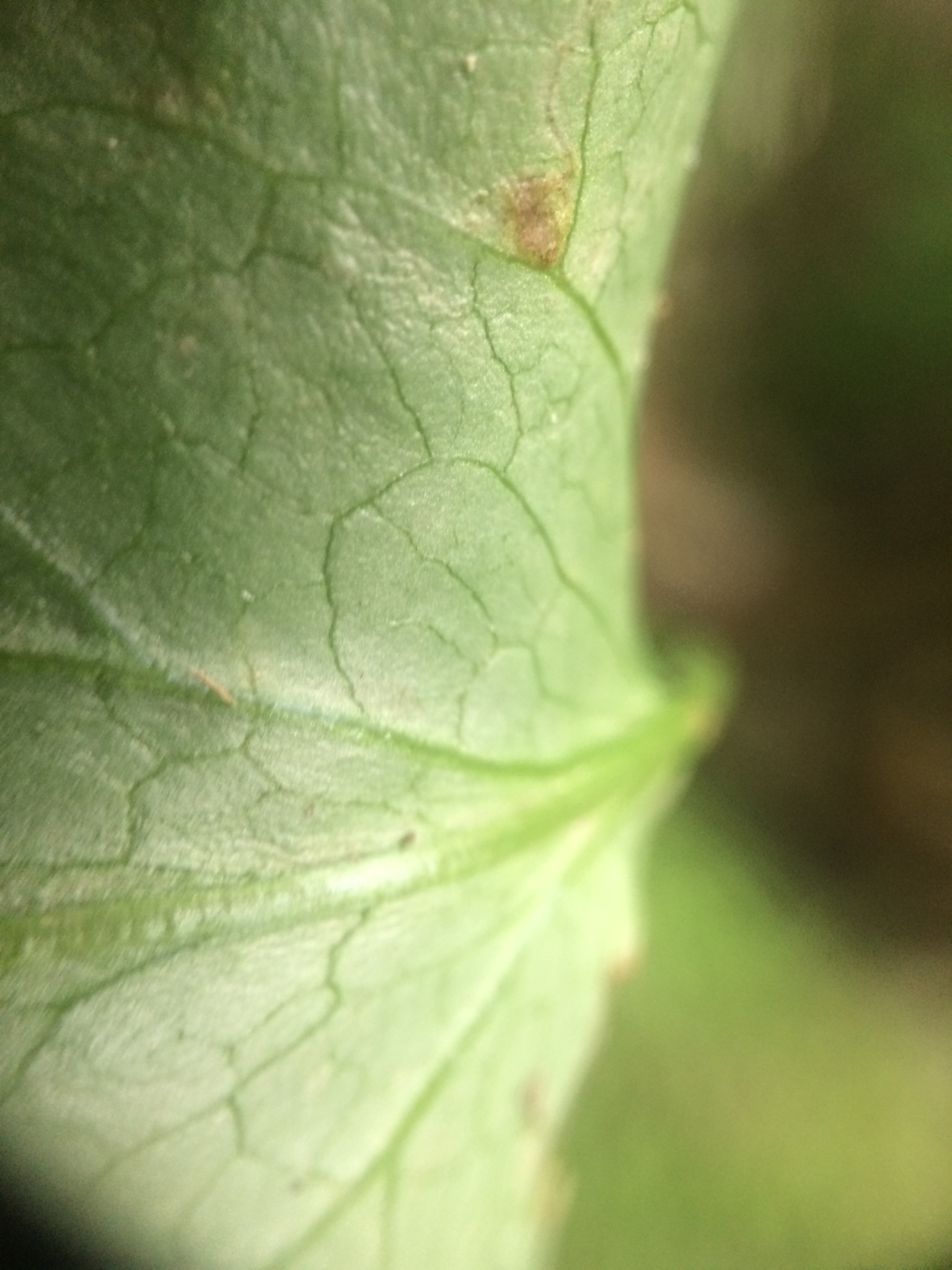
Abaxial side of a leaf

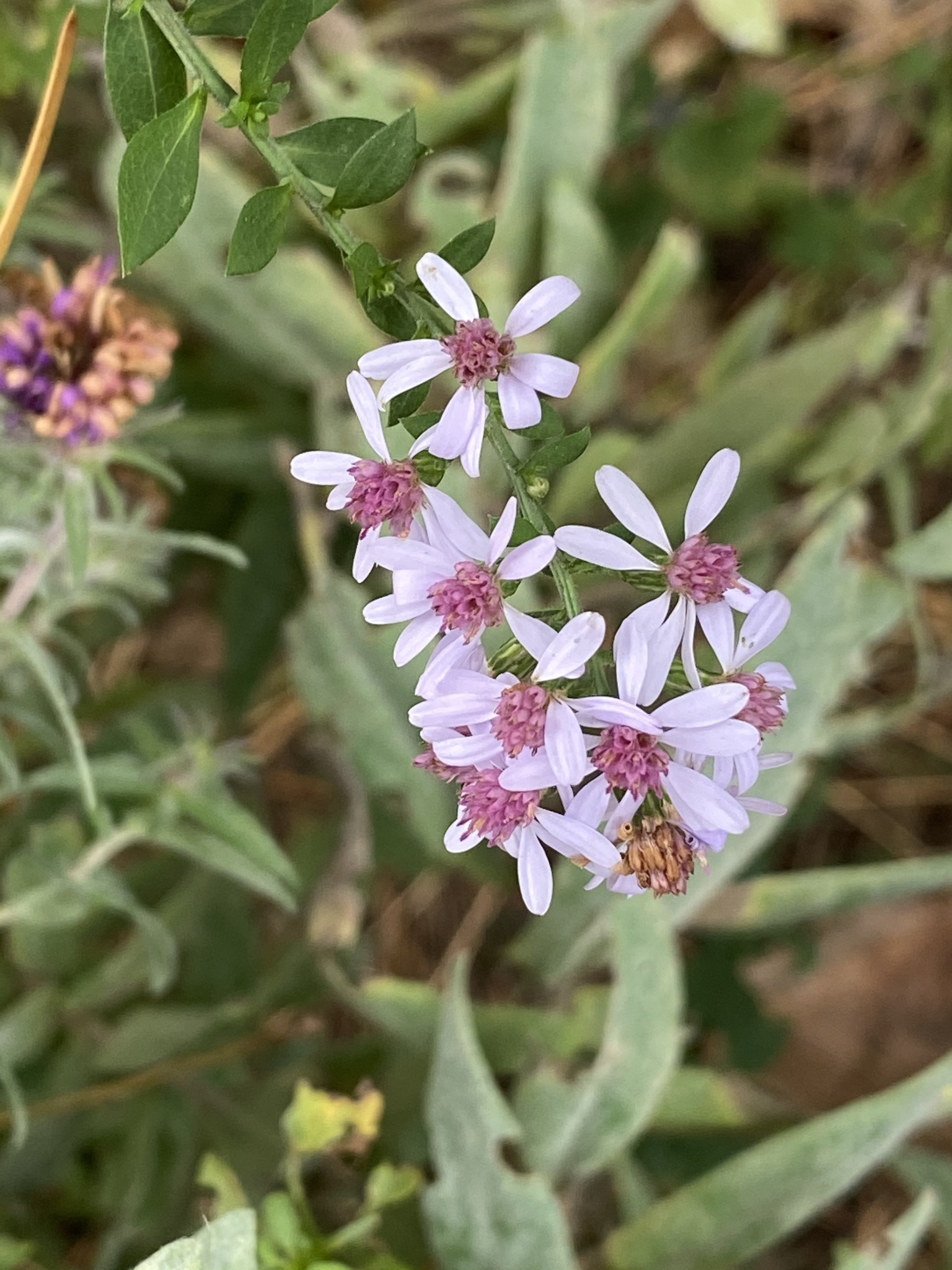
Flower heads

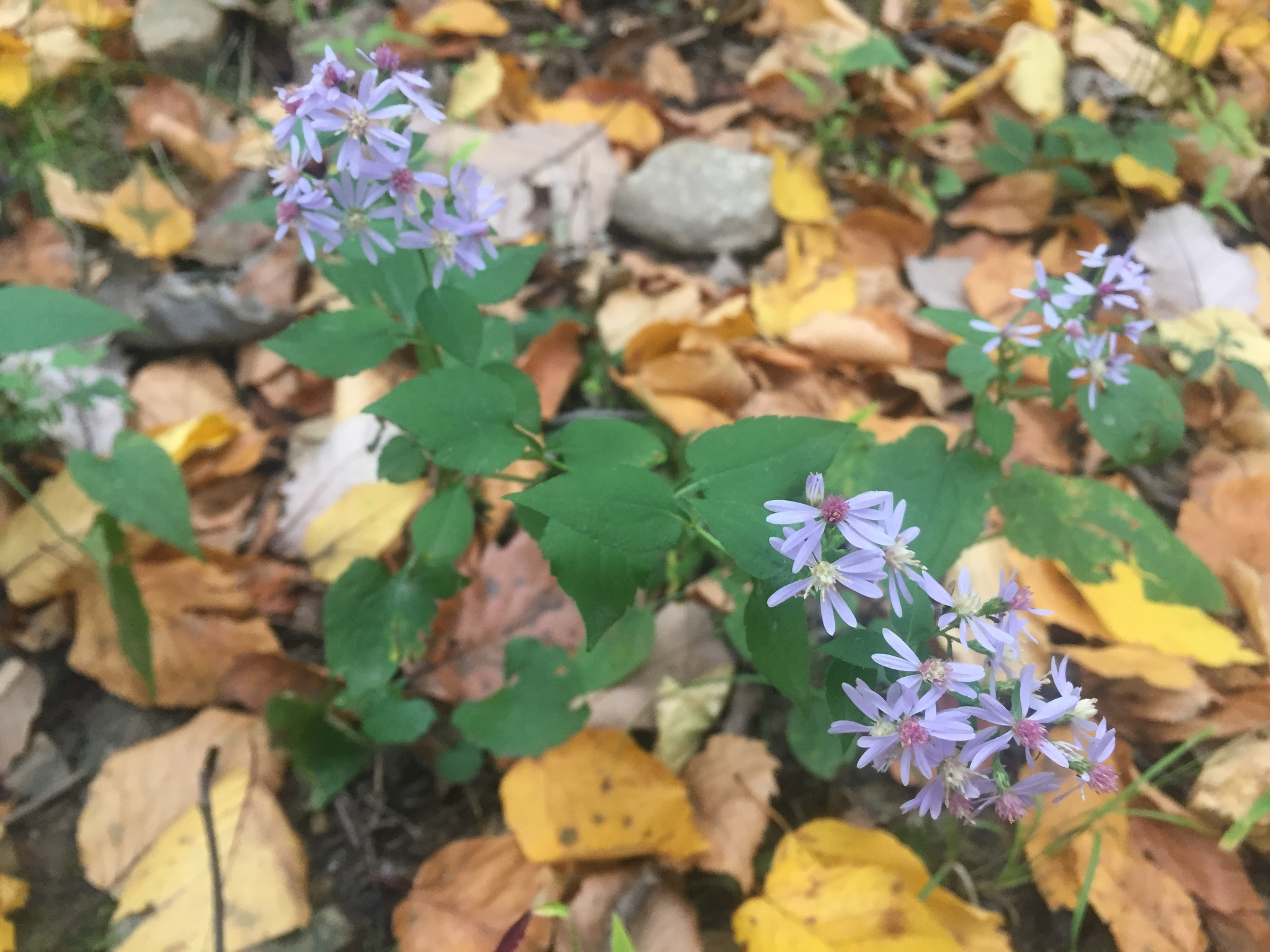
Showing light blue rays

=== Chromosomes ===
S. cordifolium has a chromosome base number of x = 8. Diploid and tetraploid cytotypes with respective counts of 16 and 32 have been reported.

== Taxonomy ==
Symphyotrichum cordifolium is classified in the subgenus Symphyotrichum, section Symphyotrichum. The species was first formally described by Carl Linnaeus in 1753 as Aster cordifolius.

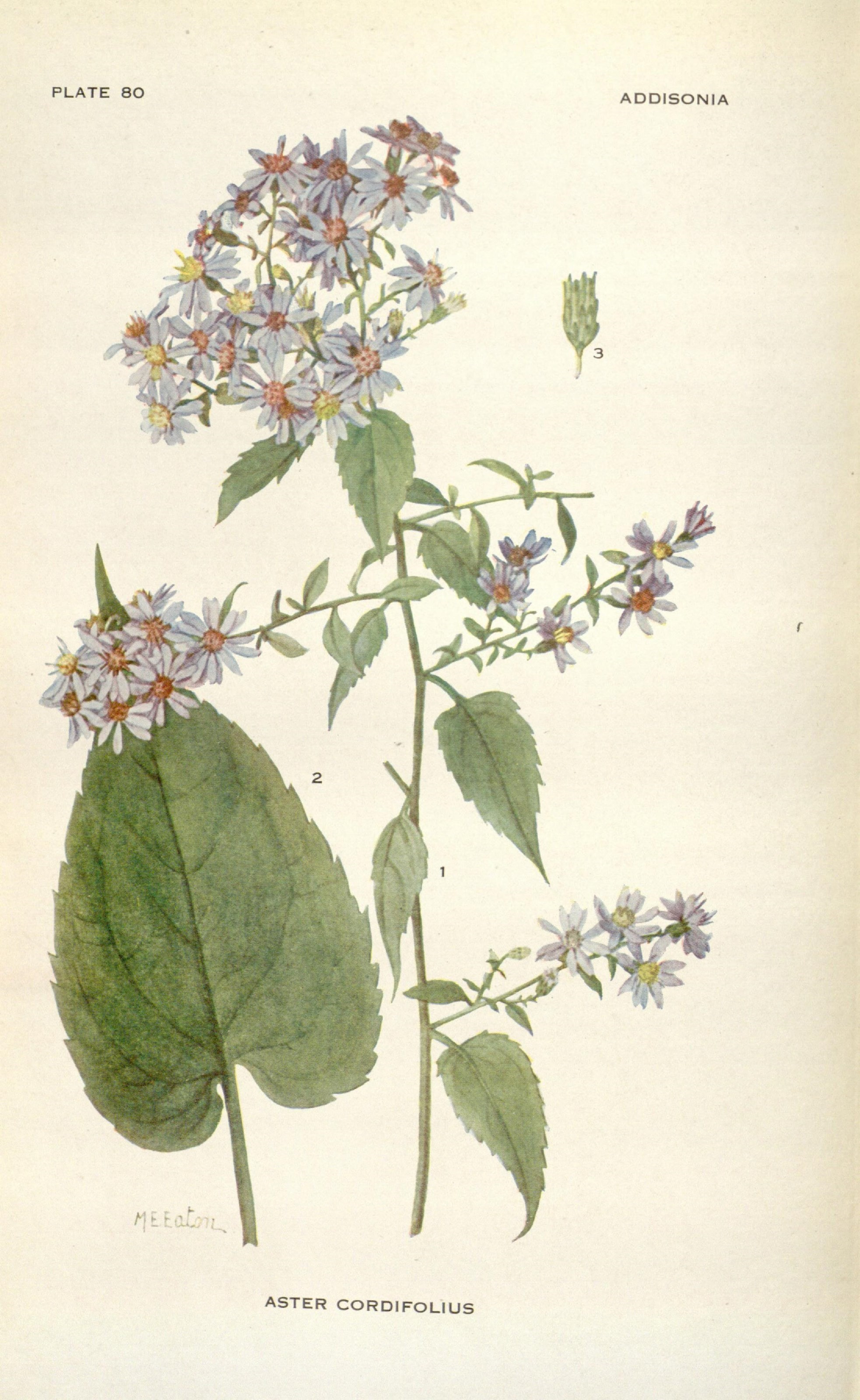
S. cordifolium botanical illustration from Addisonia, New York Botanical Garden (1917)

=== Hybrids ===
Where the range of Symphyotrichum cordifolium overlaps with that of S. puniceum, the F1 hybrid named Symphyotrichum × tardiflorum can occur. Symphyotrichum × schistosum is the hybrid of S. cordifolium and S. laeve var. laeve.

A hybrid of S. cordifolium and S. shortii may occur, and this has been named Symphyotrichum × finkii. Hybrids with S. drummondii and S. urophyllum have been reported but not confirmed.

Species classifications
- - Symphyotrichum
    - subg. Chapmaniana
      S. chapmanii
    - subg. Astropolium
      - S. divaricatum
      - S. glabrifolium
      - S. graminifolium
      - S. martii
      - S. parviflorum
      - S. patagonicum
      - S. peteroanum
      - S. potosinum
      - S. regnellii
      - S. subulatum
      - S. tenuifolium
      - S. vahlii
    - subg. Virgulus
      - sect. Ericoidei
        - S. ericoides
        - S. falcatum
      - sect. Patentes
        - ssect. Brachyphylli
          - S. adnatum
          - S. walteri
        - ssect. Patentes
          - S. georgianum
          - S. patens
          - S. phlogifolium
      - sect. Grandiflori
        - ssect. Mexicanae
          - S. bimater
          - S. chihuahuense
          - S. hintonii
          - S. moranense
          - S. purpurascens
          - S. trilineatum
          - S. turneri
        - ssect. Grandiflori
          - S. campestre
          - S. estesii
          - S. fendleri
          - S. fontinale
          - S. grandiflorum
          - S. oblongifolium
          - S. pygmaeum
          - S. yukonense
      - sect. Polyliguli
        S. novae-angliae
      - sect. Concolores
        - S. concolor
        - S. lucayanum
        - S. plumosum
        - S. pratense
        - S. sericeum
    - subg. Ascendentes (Note: Sugbenus Ascendentes is made up of two allopolyploid species with historic parents from subg. Virgulus and subg. Symphyotrichum.)
      - S. ascendens
      - S. defoliatum
    - subg. Symphyotrichum
      - sect. Conyzopsis
        - S. ciliatum
        - S. frondosum
        - S. laurentianum
      - sect. Occidentales
        - S. chilense
        - S. eatonii
        - S. foliaceum
        - S. greatae
        - S. hallii
        - S. hendersonii
        - S. jessicae
        - S. lentum
        - S. molle
        - S. spathulatum
        - S. subspicatum
      - sect. Turbinelli
        S. turbinellum
      - sect. Symphyotrichum
        - ssect. Dumosi
          - S. boreale
          - S. bullatum
          - S. burgessii
          - S. carnerosanum
          - S. dumosum
          - S. eulae
          - S. lanceolatum
          - S. lateriflorum
          - S. leone
          - S. nahanniense
          - S. ontarionis
          - S. praealtum
          - S. racemosum
          - S. schaffneri
          - S. simmondsii
          - S. tradescantii
          - S. welshii
        - ssect. Heterophylli
          - ser. Concinni
            - S. laeve
            - S. oolentangiense
          - ser. Cordifolii
            - S. anomalum
            - S. ciliolatum
            - S. cordifolium
            - S. drummondii
            - S. shortii
            - S. undulatum
            - S. urophyllum
        - ssect. Porteriani
          - S. depauperatum
          - S. kentuckiense
          - S. parviceps
          - S. pilosum
          - S. porteri
        - ssect. Symphyotrichum
          - ser. Punicei
            - S. elliottii
            - S. firmum
            - S. prenanthoides
            - S. puniceum
            - S. rhiannon
          - ser. Symphyotrichum
            - S. anticostense
            - S. novi-belgii
            - S. retroflexum
            - S. robynsianum
  Cladogram references

== Distribution and habitat ==
Symphyotrichum cordifolium occurs from Manitoba, east to Nova Scotia and Maine, south to Georgia and Alabama, and west to Oklahoma. It was once introduced in British Columbia but did not persist. It is an introduced species in Great Britain and Norway.

It grows primarily in mesic sites with soils that are rocky to loamy but generally rich, at heights ranging from sea level along the coastal plain up to 1,200 m (3,900 ft) in the Appalachian Mountains. It can be found on open wooded slopes, along the banks of streams, on moist ledges, in swampy woods, along the borders of beech–maple forests and oak–hickory forests, as well as in clearings, thickets, and along roadsides and ditches. It also can be found in urban areas where it is sometimes considered a weed species.

== Ecology ==
=== Reproduction ===
Symphyotrichum cordifolium reproduces vegetatively via short rhizomes, as well as via wind-dispersed seeds. The ray florets of species in the Symphyotrichum genus are exclusively female, each having a pistil but no stamen, while disk florets are bisexual, each with both male and female reproductive parts.

=== Pests and diseases ===
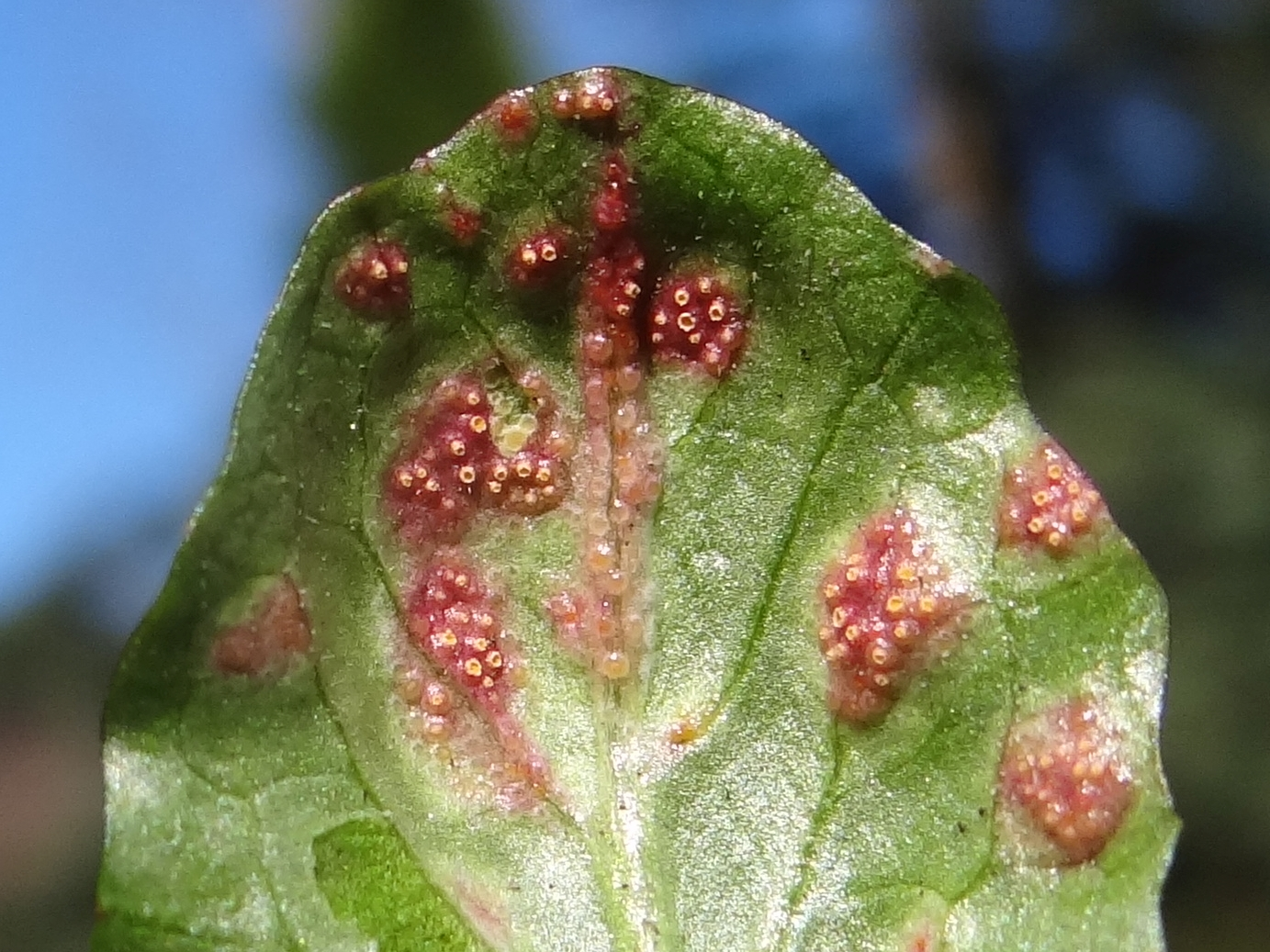
Puccinia dioicae on a leaf of Taraxacum officinale

Two rusts have been recorded on S. cordifolium: the brown rust Puccinia dioicae and the red rust Coleosporium asterum.

== Conservation ==
Symphyotrichum cordifolium has coefficients of conservatism (C-values) in the Floristic Quality Assessment (FQA) that range from 2 to 8 depending on evaluation region. The lower the C-value, the higher tolerance the species has for disturbance and the lesser the likelihood that it is growing in a presettlement natural community. In the Dakotas, for example, S. cordifolium has a C-value of 8, meaning its populations there are found in high-quality remnant natural areas with little environmental degradation but can tolerate some periodic disturbance. In contrast, in the Laurentian plains and hills of Maine and New Brunswick, it has been given a C-value of 2, meaning its presence in locations of that ecoregion provides little confidence of a remnant habitat.

As of July 2021, NatureServe listed Symphyotrichum cordifolium as Secure (G5) worldwide, Critically Imperiled (S1) in Kansas, and Vulnerable (S3) in Delaware and Missouri.

== Uses ==
=== Medicinal ===
The Ojibwe have used S. cordifolium to make an incense to attract deer.

=== Gardening ===
Symphyotrichum cordifolium is cultivated as a garden plant under its current name and the older name Aster cordifolius. Several cultivars have been selected for garden use, and the following have achieved the Royal Horticultural Society's Award of Garden Merit:

- 'Chieftain' has "light mauve-blue ray florets".
- 'Little Carlow' (S. cordifolium hybrid) with "abundant violet-blue" rays.
- ‘Photograph’ (S. cordifolium hybrid) has "pale lilac-blue flowers".
- 'Sweet Lavender' with "lavender-blue flowers".
