= Chymsydia =

Scientific classification
- Kingdom: Plantae
- Clade: Tracheophytes
- Clade: Angiosperms
- Clade: Eudicots
- Clade: Asterids
- Order: Apiales
- Family: Apiaceae
- Subfamily: Apioideae
- Tribe: Selineae
- Genus: Chymsydia; Albov
- Species: C. agasylloides

Binomial name
- Chymsydia agasylloides (Albov) Albov

Synonyms
- Agasyllis chymsydia Drude, nom. superfl.; Selinum agasylloidesa Albov

Genus of flowering plants

Chymsydia is a genus of flowering plant in the family Apiaceae with one species, Chymsydia agasylloides, native to the Transcaucasus.
