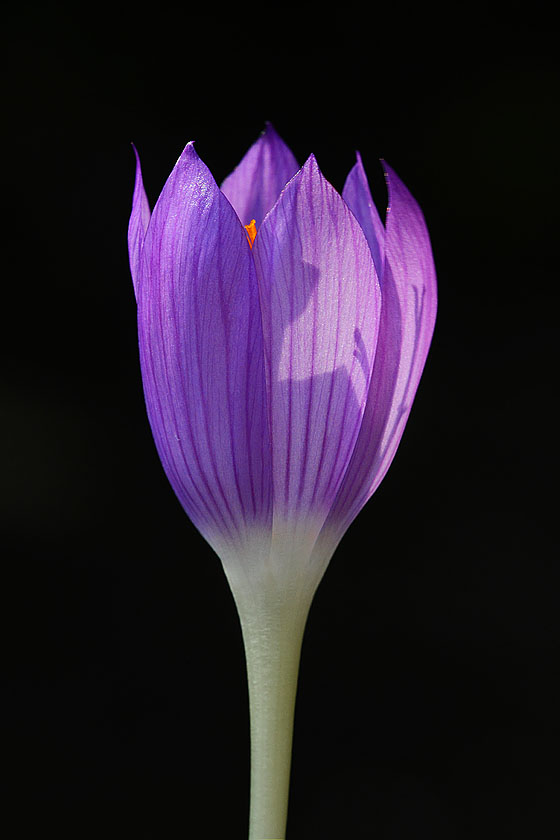

Scientific classification
- Kingdom: Plantae
- Clade: Embryophytes
- Clade: Tracheophytes
- Clade: Angiosperms
- Clade: Monocots
- Order: Asparagales
- Family: Iridaceae
- Genus: Crocus
- Species: C. autranii

Binomial name
- Crocus autranii Albov

= Crocus autranii =

Species of flowering plant

Crocus autranii is a species of flowering plant in the genus Crocus of the family Iridaceae. It is a cormous perennial native to the western Transcaucasus (Abkhazia).
