= Bucculatrix adelpha =

Scientific classification
- Kingdom: Animalia
- Phylum: Arthropoda
- Clade: Pancrustacea
- Class: Insecta
- Order: Lepidoptera
- Family: Bucculatricidae
- Genus: Bucculatrix
- Species: B. adelpha

Binomial name
- Bucculatrix adelpha Braun, 1963

Species of moth

Bucculatrix adelpha is a moth species in the family Bucculatricidae. It was first described in 1963 by Annette Frances Braun, and is found in North America, where it has been recorded in Ontario, Indiana and Maine.

The wingspan is 8–9.4 mm. Adults have been recorded on wing in June and July.

The larvae feed on Aster species, including Aster cordifolius.
