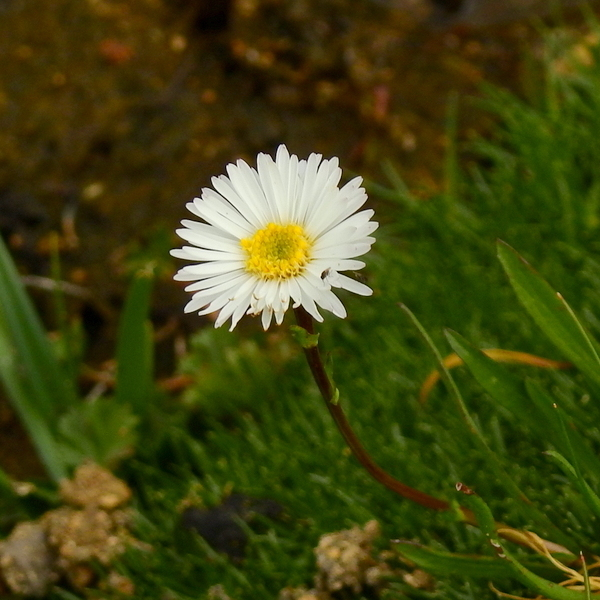
- Malargüe, Mendoza, Argentina

Scientific classification
- Kingdom: Plantae
- Clade: Tracheophytes
- Clade: Angiosperms
- Clade: Eudicots
- Clade: Asterids
- Order: Asterales
- Family: Asteraceae
- Tribe: Astereae
- Subtribe: Symphyotrichinae
- Genus: Symphyotrichum
- Subgenus: Symphyotrichum subg. Astropolium
- Species: S. glabrifolium

Binomial name
- Symphyotrichum glabrifolium (DC.) G.L.Nesom
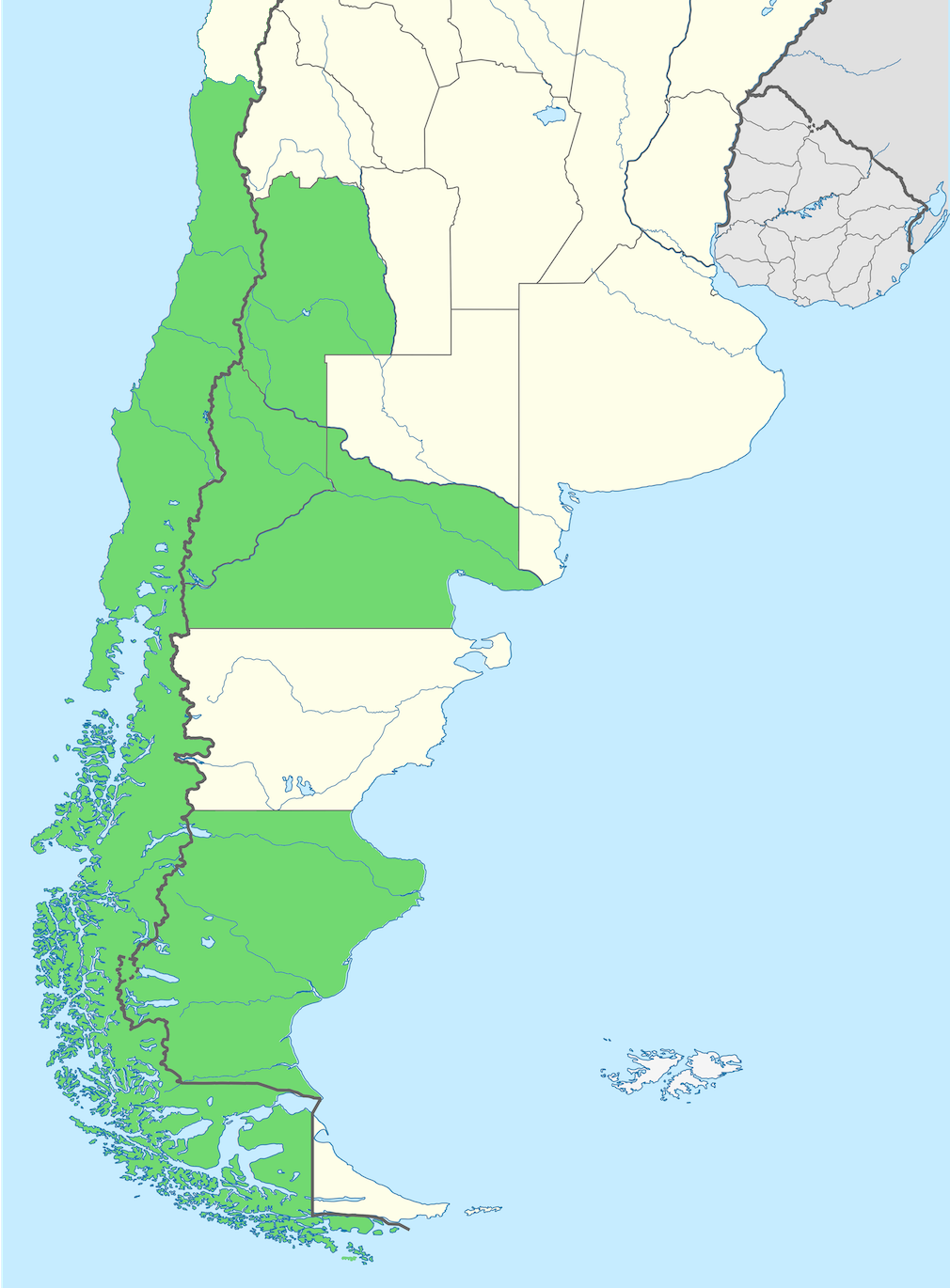
- Native distribution

Synonyms
- Basionym: Erigeron glabrifolius DC.; Alphabetical list: Aster glabrifolius (DC.) Reiche; Aster scorzonerifolius (J.Rémy) Speg.; Aster vahlii var. australis (Phil.) Reiche; Erigeron australis Phil.; Erigeron scorzonerifolius J.Rémy; Erigeron scorzonerifolius var. pumilus Albov; Erigeron semiamplexicaulis var. scorzonerifolius (J.Rémy) Macloskie

= Symphyotrichum glabrifolium =

Species of plant in the aster family

Symphyotrichum glabrifolium (formerly Aster glabrifolius and Erigeron glabrifolius) is a species of flowering plant in the family Asteraceae native to Argentina and Chile where it inhabits wet meadows and stream edges. It is a perennial, herbaceous plant that grows 5 to 25 centimeters (2 to 10 inches) tall. Its flowers have white or lilac ray florets and yellow disk florets.

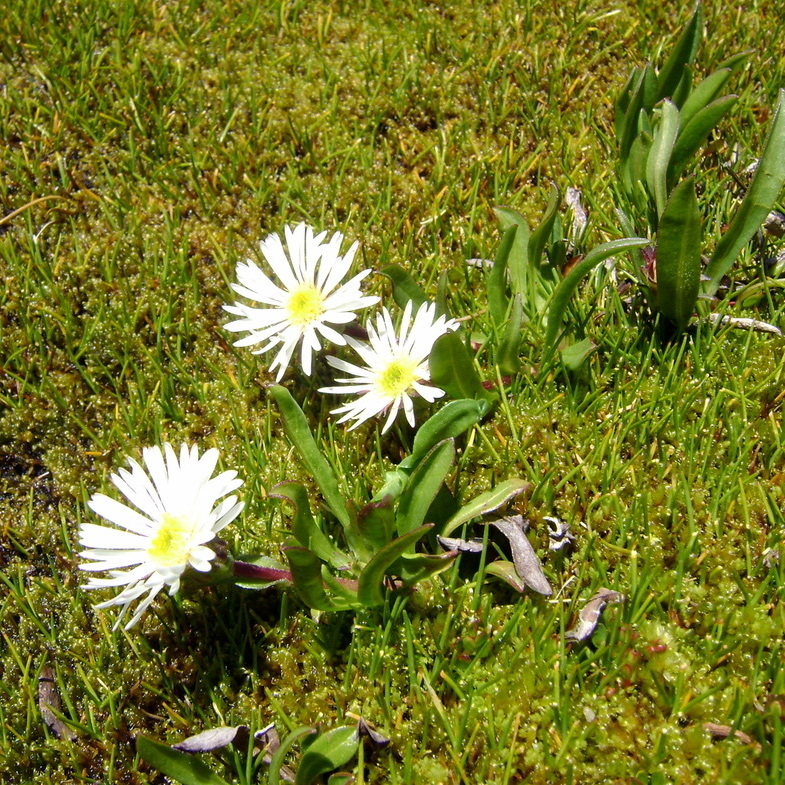
Full plant

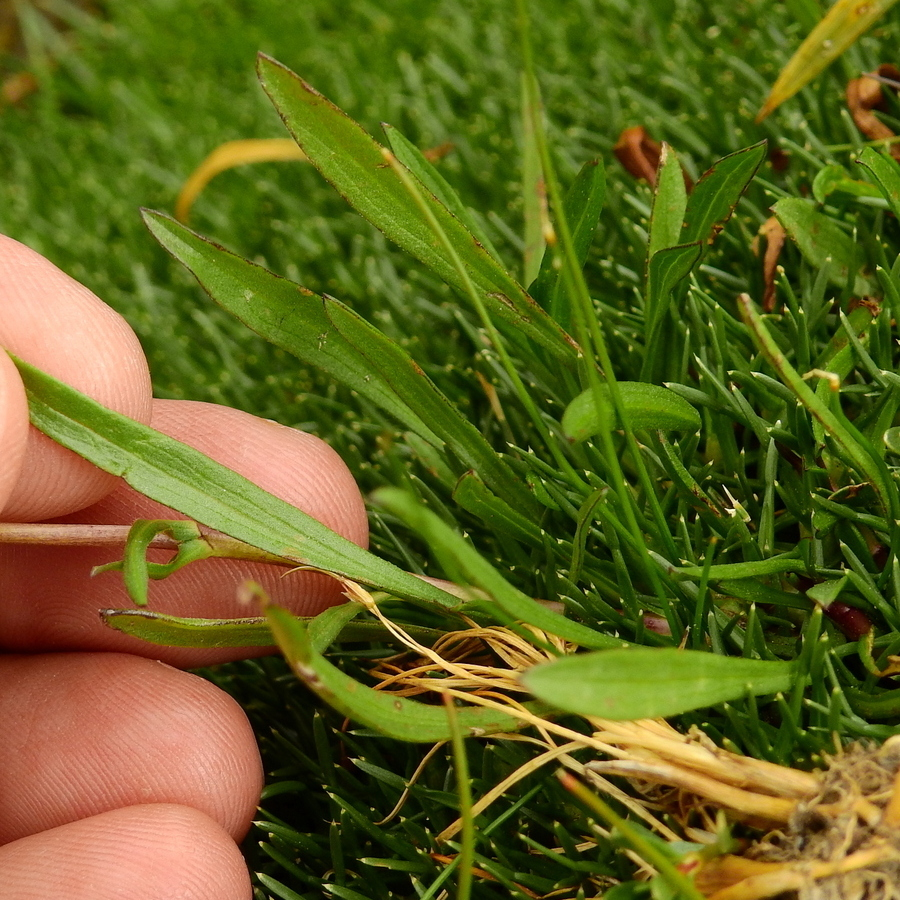
Leaves

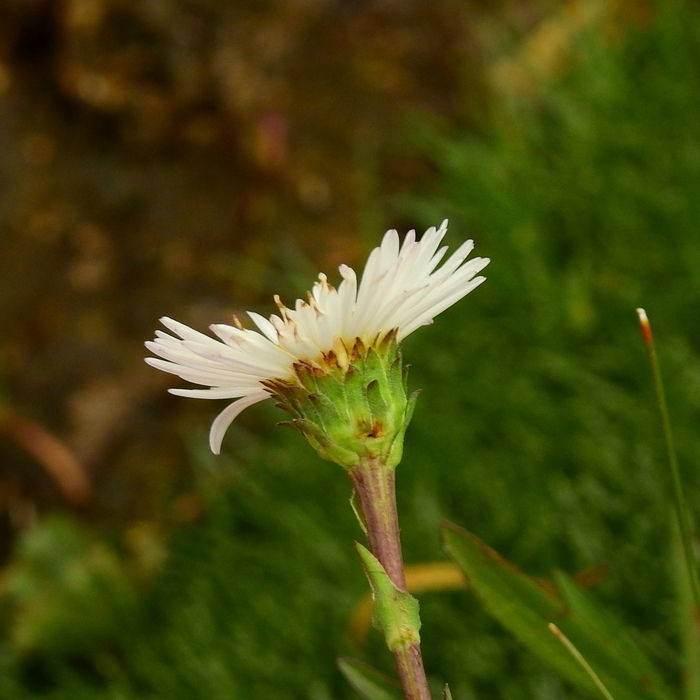
Bracts, involucres, and phyllaries

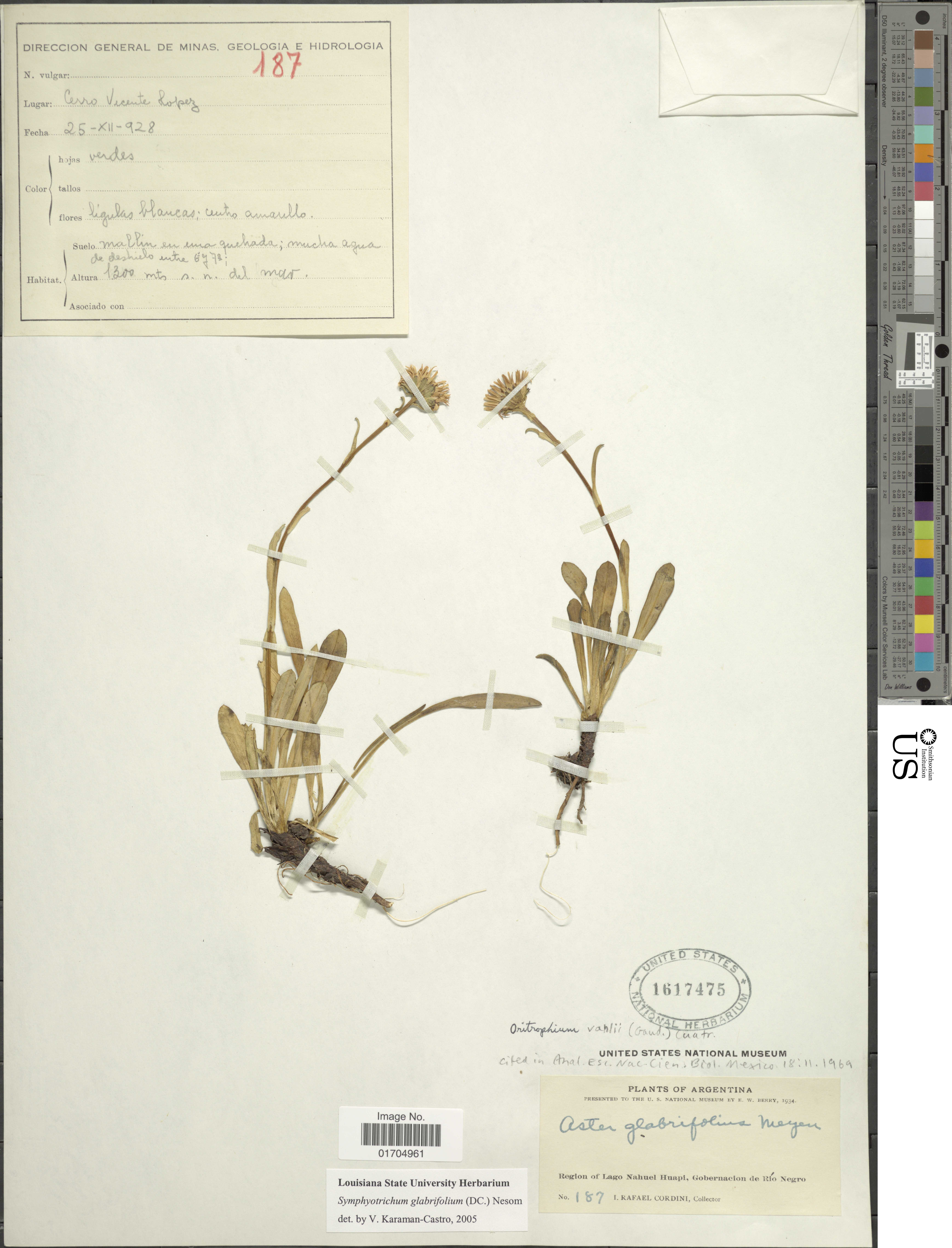
Aster glabrifolius herbarium specimen 01704961 stored at the National Museum of Natural History, Smithsonian Institution; collected 25 December 1928 at Nahuel Huapi Lake, Río Negro Province, Argentina, Cerro Vicente Lopez, 1,300 meters (4,300 feet)
