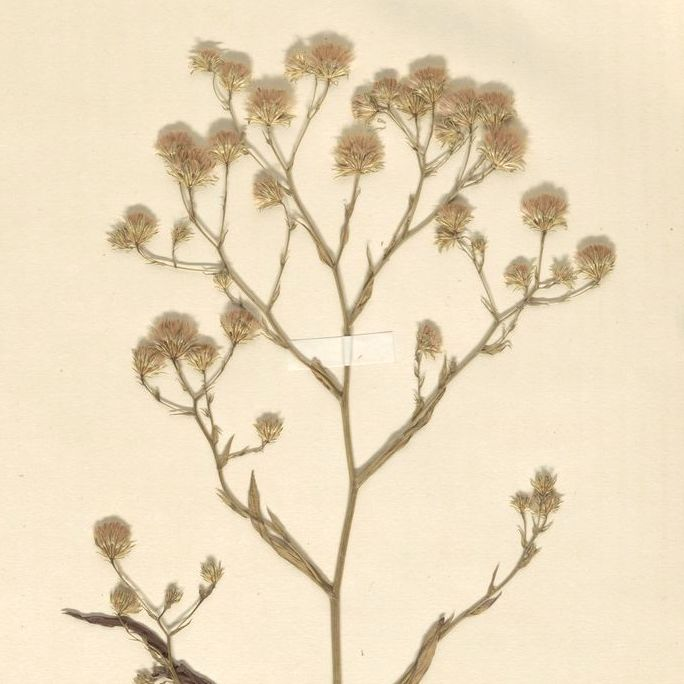

Scientific classification
- Kingdom: Plantae
- Clade: Tracheophytes
- Clade: Angiosperms
- Clade: Eudicots
- Clade: Asterids
- Order: Asterales
- Family: Asteraceae
- Tribe: Astereae
- Subtribe: Symphyotrichinae
- Genus: Symphyotrichum
- Subgenus: Symphyotrichum subg. Astropolium
- Species: S. graminifolium

Binomial name
- Symphyotrichum graminifolium (Spreng.) G.L.Nesom
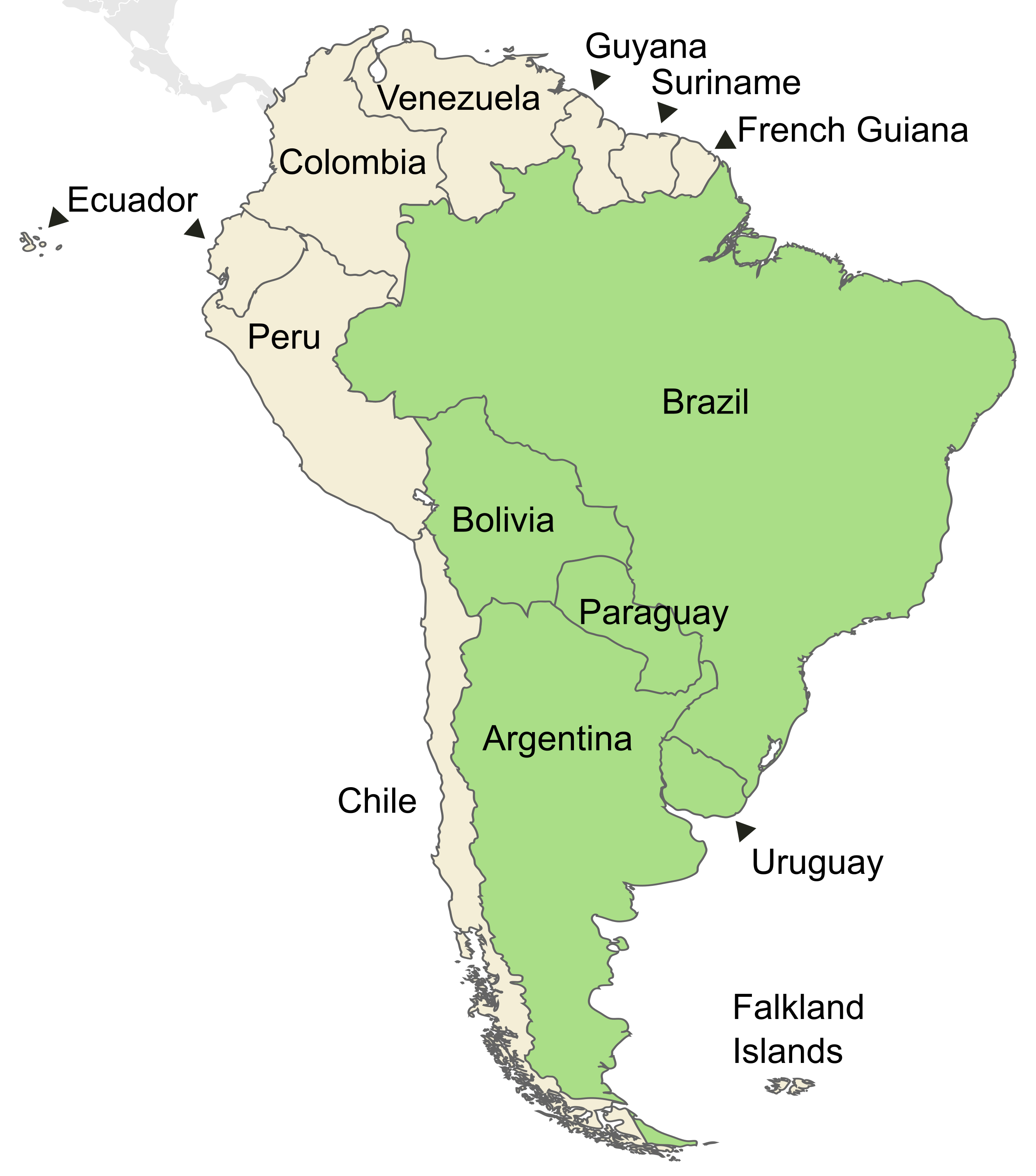
- Native distribution by country

Synonyms
- Basionym: Conyza graminifolia Spreng.; Alphabetical list: Aster cabrerae Ariza; Aster divaricatus var. graminifolius (Spreng.) Baker; Aster exilis var. graminifolius Malme; Aster squamatus var. graminifolius (Spreng.) Hieron.; Conyzanthus graminifolius (Spreng.) Tamamsch.

= Symphyotrichum graminifolium =

Species of flowering plant in the daisy family

Symphyotrichum graminifolium (formerly Conyza graminifolia and Aster cabrerae) is a species of flowering plant in the family Asteraceae native to the South American countries of Argentina, Bolivia, Brazil, Paraguay, and Uruguay. It is a perennial, herbaceous plant that grows to 1.5 meters (5 feet) tall. Its numerous flowers are in broad corymbiform arrays with lilac or bluish ray florets.

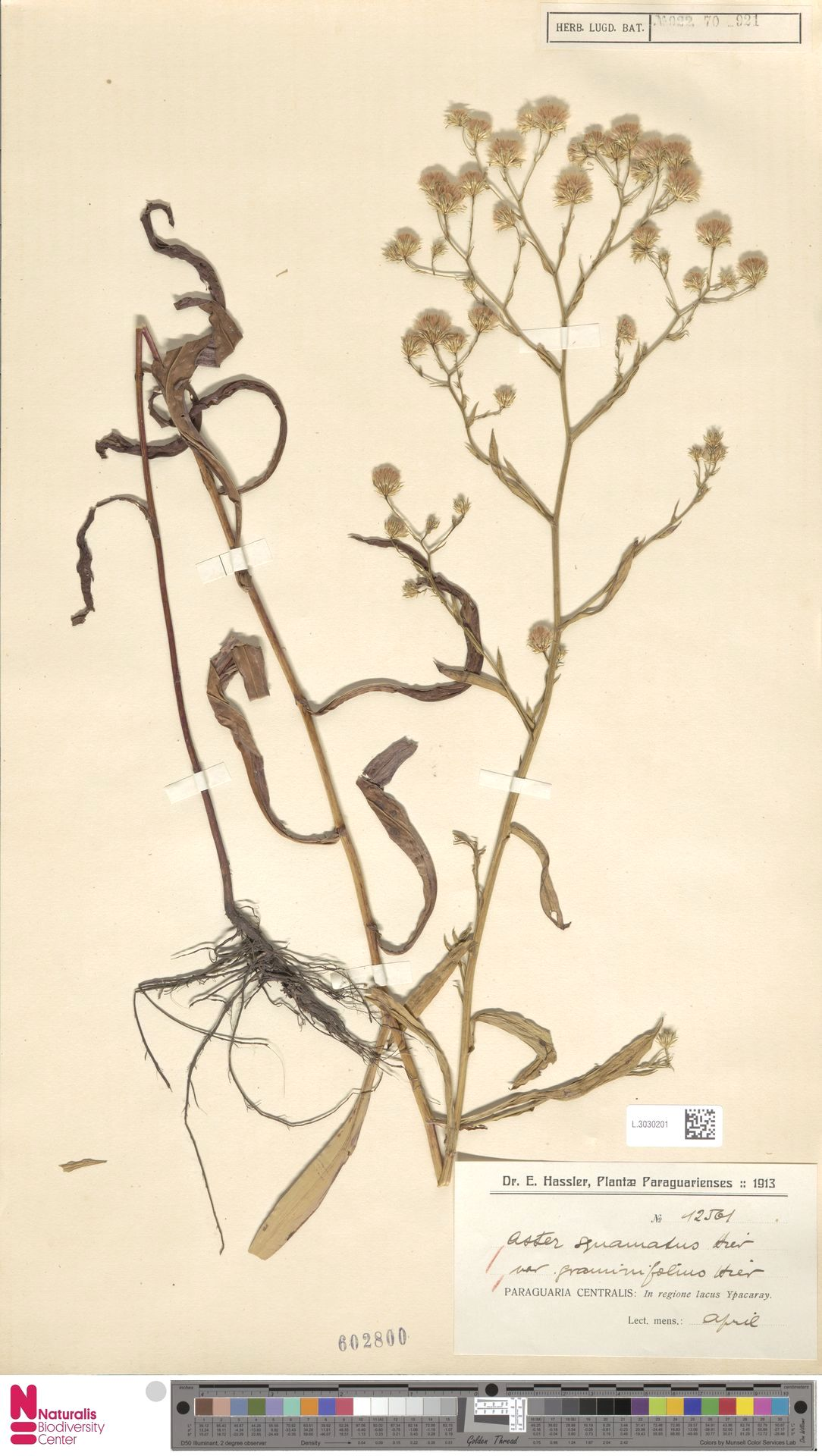
S. graminifolium herbarium specimen (labeled as Aster squamatus var. graminifolius)
