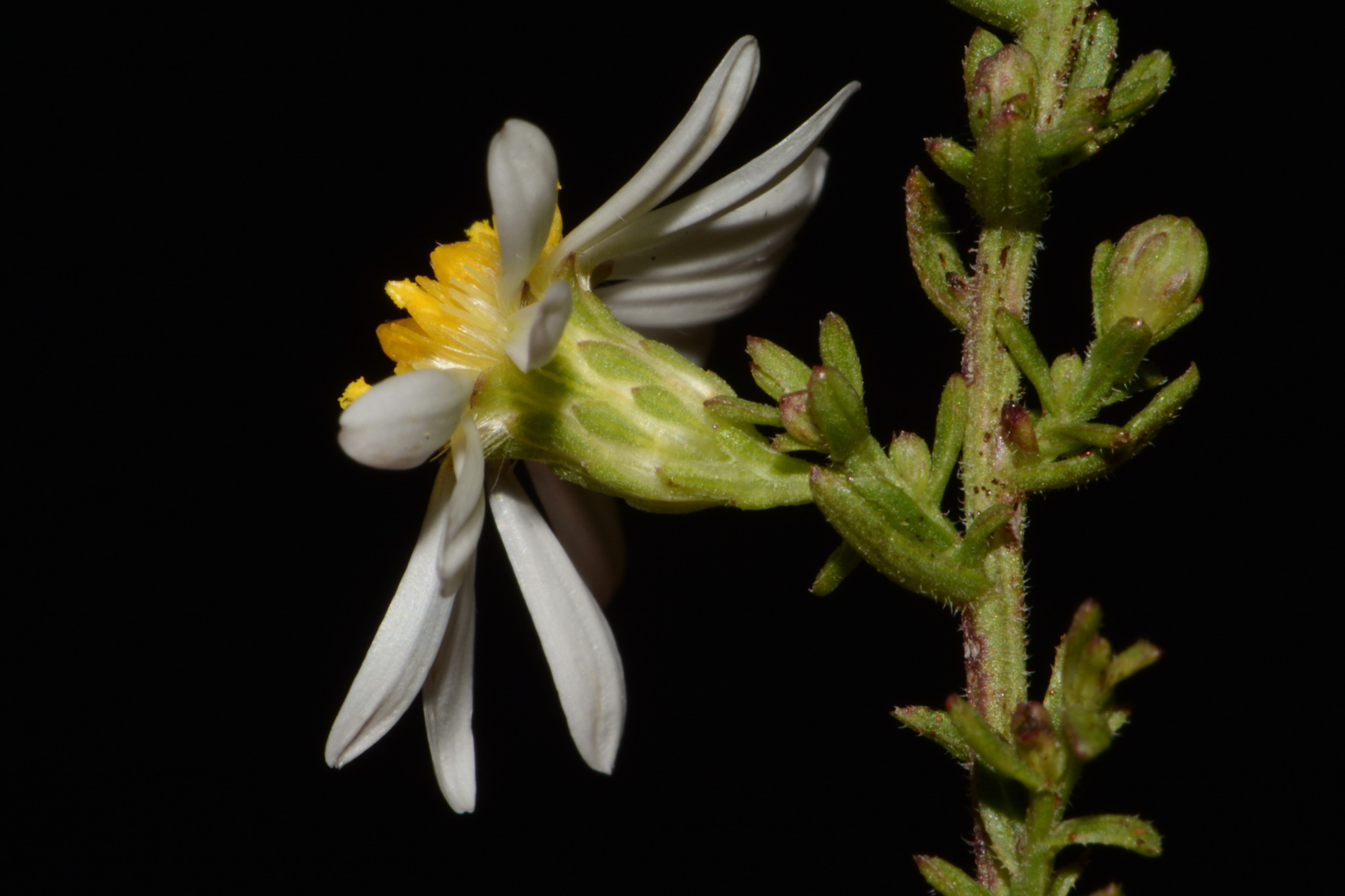

Conservation status
- Critically Imperiled (NatureServe)

Scientific classification
- Kingdom: Plantae
- Clade: Tracheophytes
- Clade: Angiosperms
- Clade: Eudicots
- Clade: Asterids
- Order: Asterales
- Family: Asteraceae
- Tribe: Astereae
- Subtribe: Symphyotrichinae
- Genus: Symphyotrichum
- Subgenus: Symphyotrichum subg. Virgulus
- Section: Symphyotrichum sect. Grandiflori
- Species: S. estesii

Binomial name
- Symphyotrichum estesii Semple
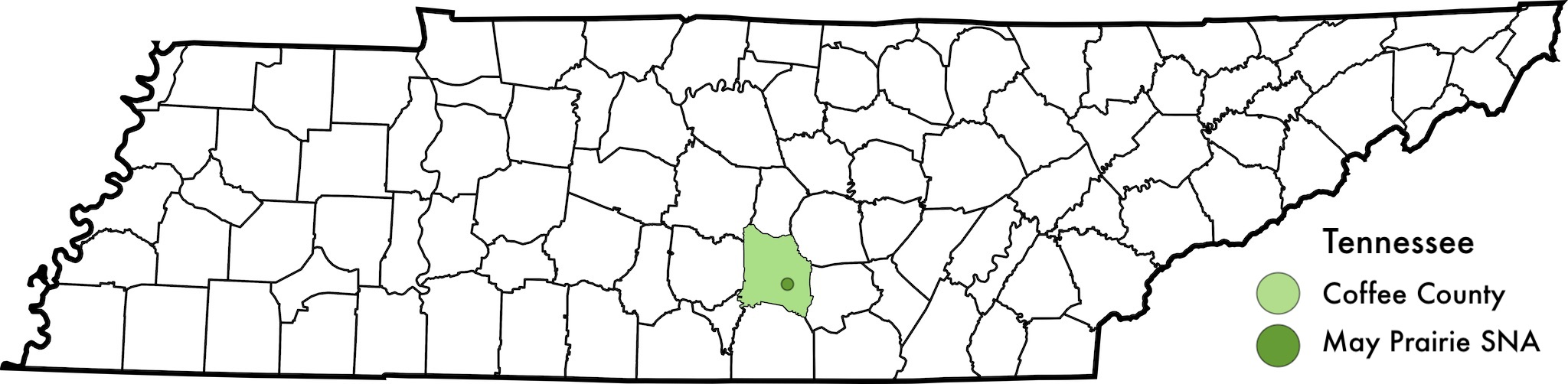
- May Prairie State Natural Area; Coffee County, Tennessee; 35.45°N 86.02°W

= Symphyotrichum estesii =

Species of flowering plant in the aster family

Symphyotrichum estesii is a species of flowering plant in the family Asteraceae, endemic to Coffee County, Tennessee. Commonly called May Prairie aster and Estes's aster, it is a perennial, herbaceous plant that may reach 30 to 85 centimeters (12 to 33 inches) in height. Its flowers have white ray florets and yellow disk florets. It is named in honor of botanist Dwayne Estes who discovered it in 2008.

== Description ==
Symphyotrichum estesii is a perennial plant that blooms August through November. It grows from a long rhizome and forms colonies. Growing on one to several erect stems, the plants reach heights between 30 and 85 centimeters (12 and 33 inches). Its firm, hairy, green leaves range from lengths 5 to 6.6 cm (2 to 2 1/2 in) at the base to much shorter 1 to 7 millimeters on the higher stems. It has sometimes up to 50 white-rayed flower heads with yellow centers. Each head has approximately 9 to 17 ray florets surrounding 12 to 28 disk florets.

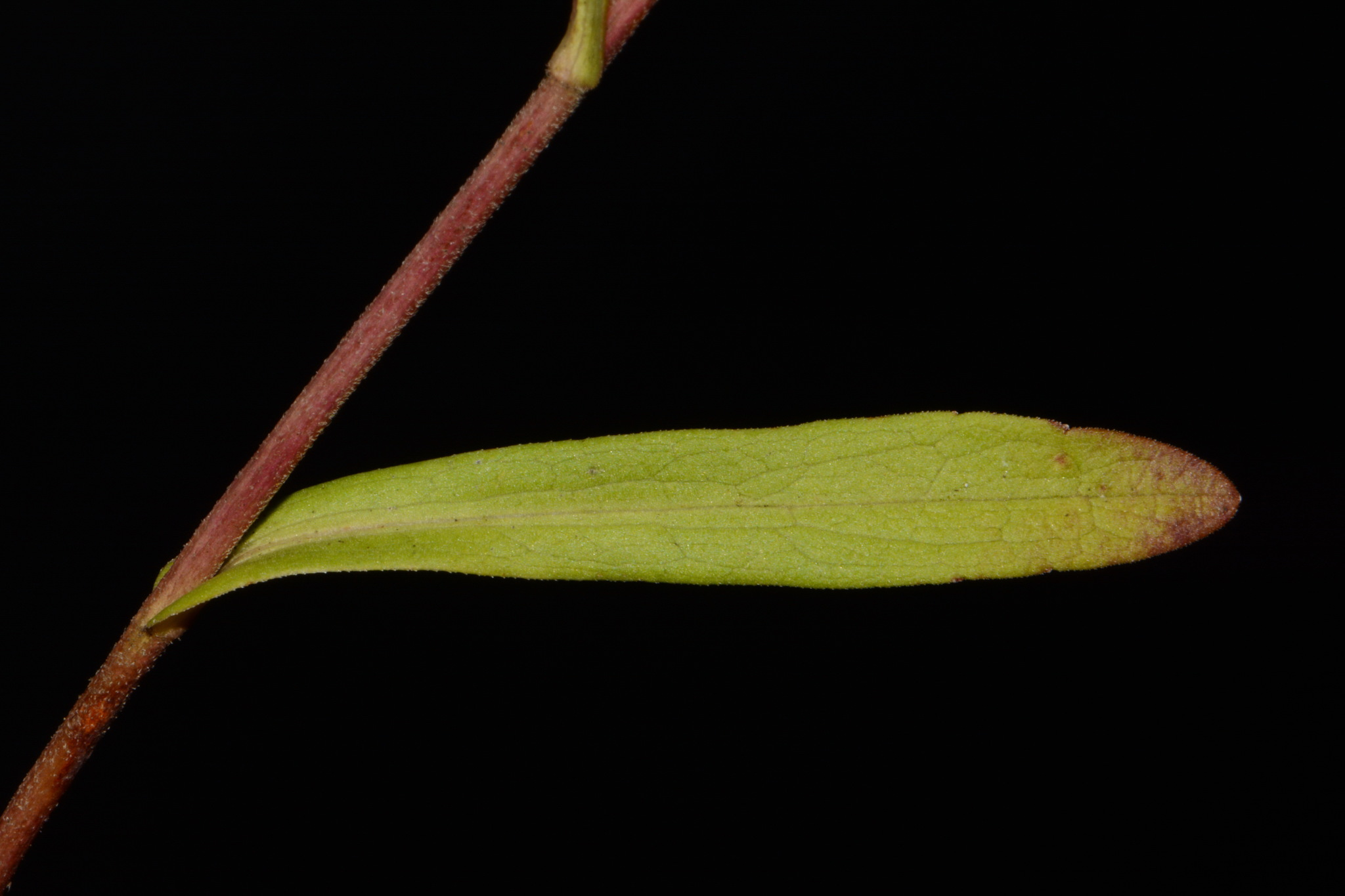
Leaves and stem

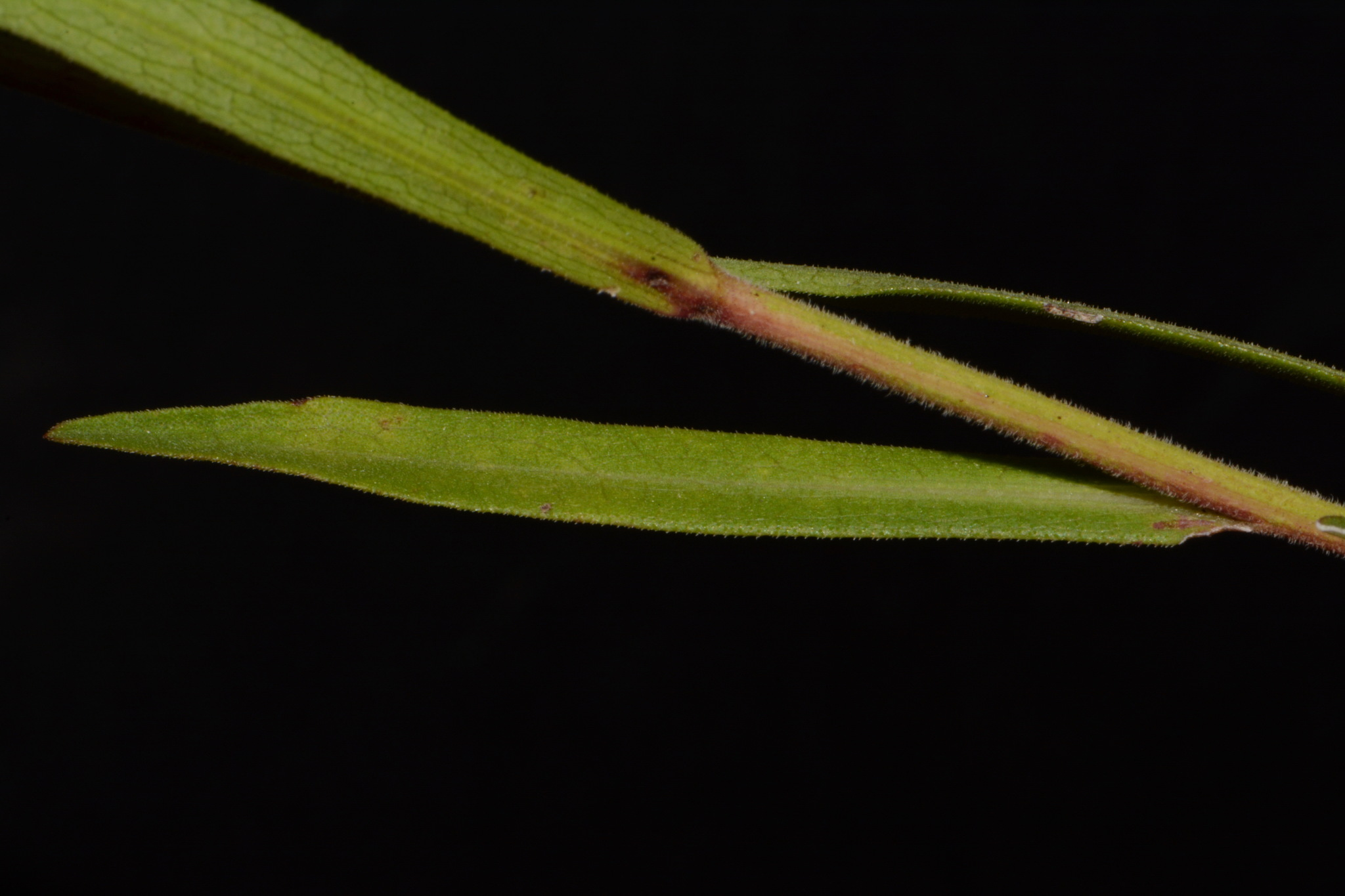
Leaves and stem

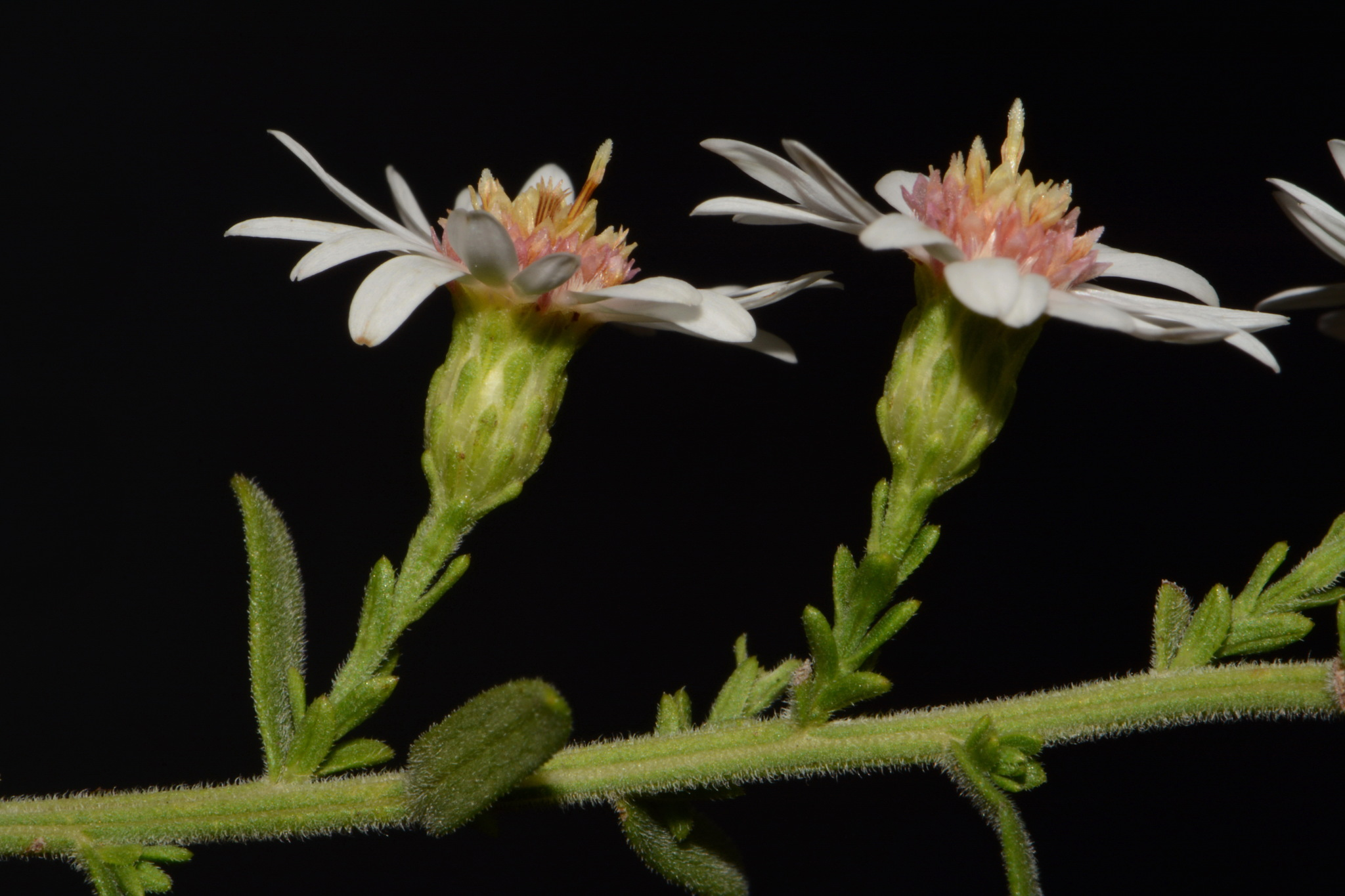
Inflorescence showing bracts, involucres, and phyllaries

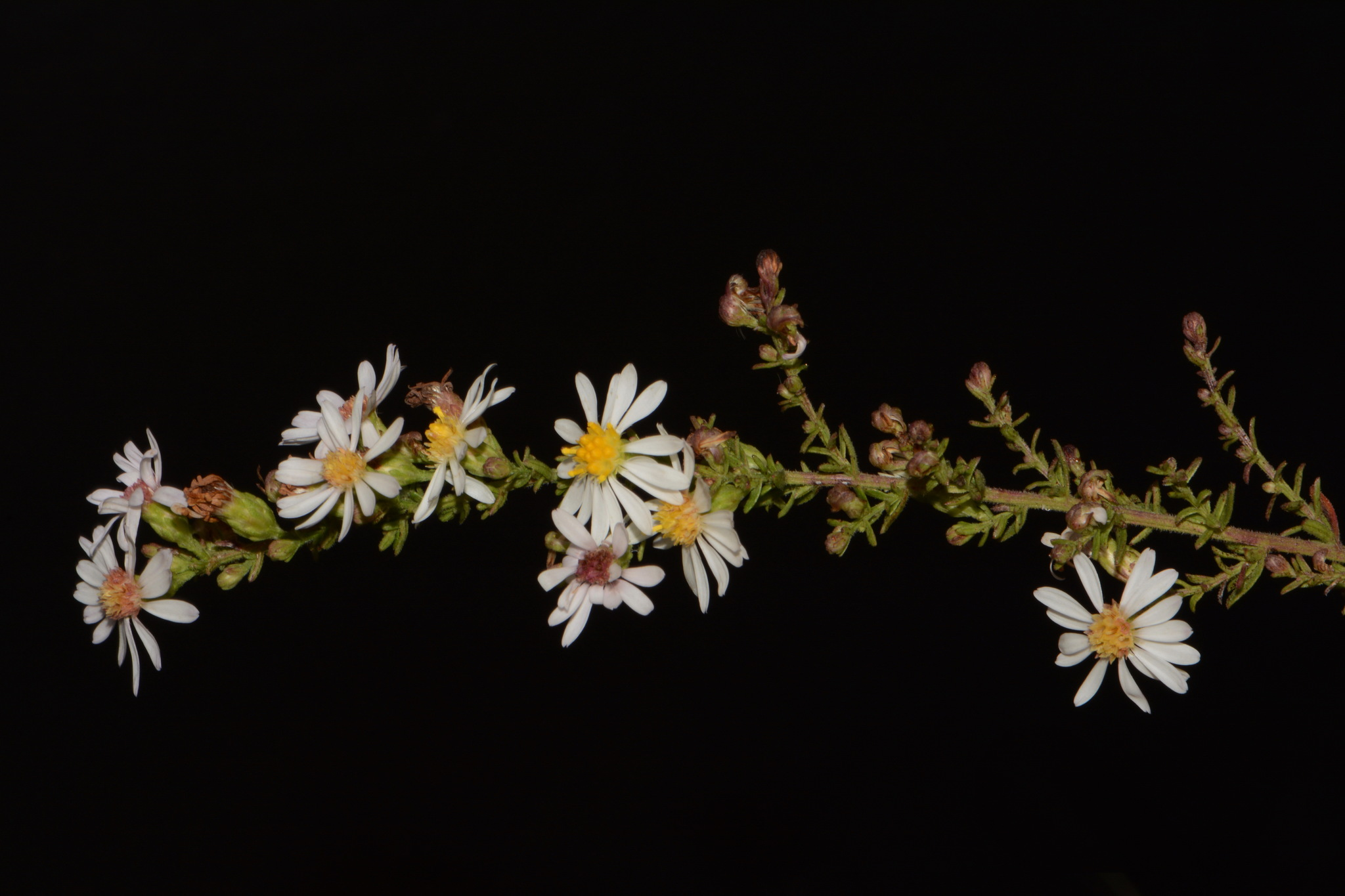
Larger inflorescence

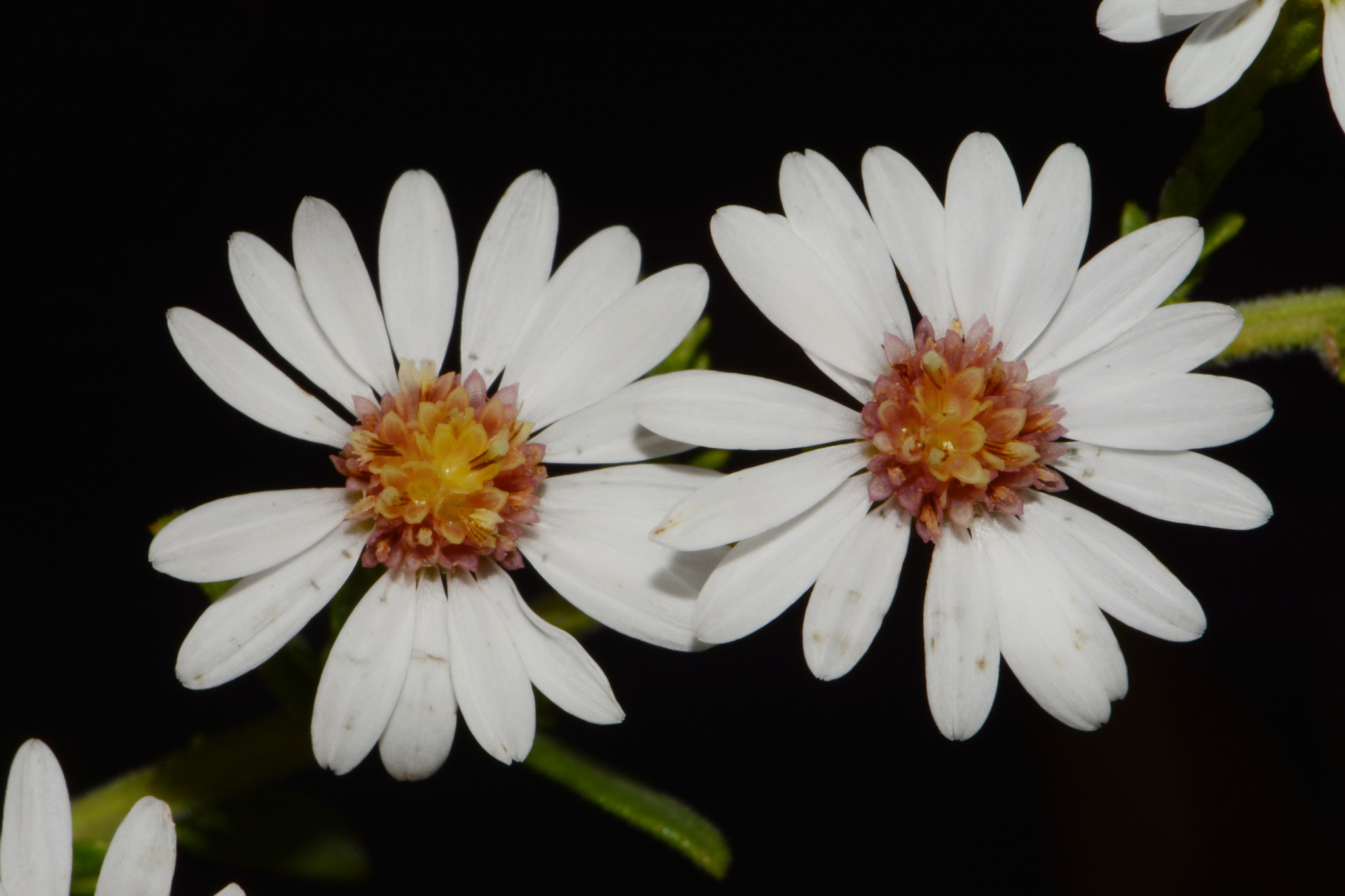
Ray and disk florets

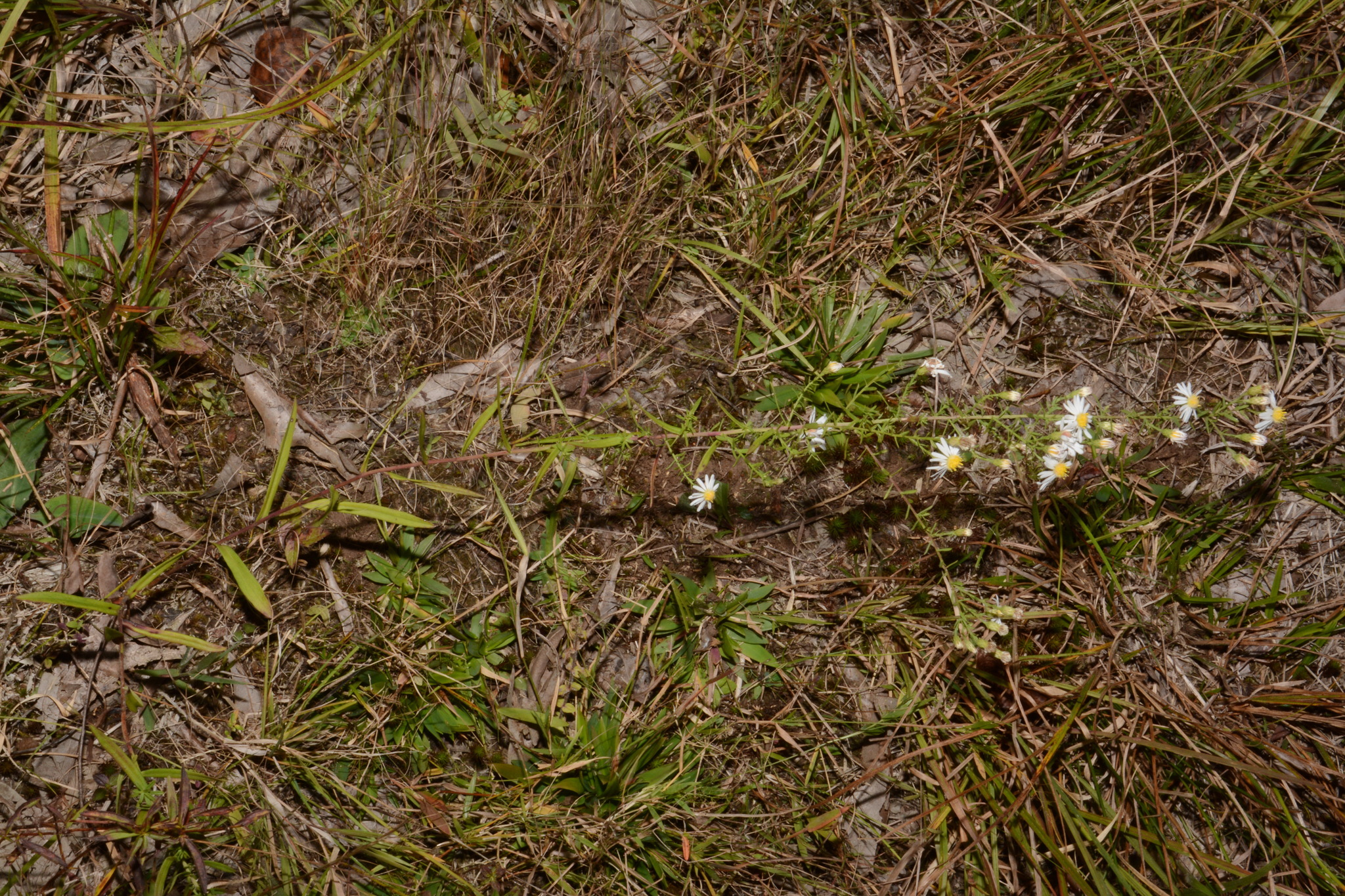
Growth habit in prairie

=== Chromosomes ===
Symphyotrichum estesii has a base number of x = 5 with an octaploid count of 40 determined by using meiosis from multiple pollen mother cells.

== Taxonomy ==
Symphyotrichum estesii is classified in the subgenus Virgulus, section Grandiflori. It is named in honor of Austin Peay State University professor of biology and herbarium director Dwayne Estes who discovered it in 2008.

== Distribution and habitat ==
Symphyotrichum estesii is found only in the May Prairie State Natural Area of Coffee County, Tennessee, within an area of less than 5 hectares (less than approximately 12 acres). May Prairie is located in the Eastern Highland Rim of central Tennessee.

Within May Prairie are an open grassland little bluestem community and a tallgrass prairie community, as well as some sedge meadows. This combined grassland community is surrounded by an oak forest that begins the oak barrens. The Symphyotrichum estesii population thrives in the hydroxeric soils in the open and sunny flat prairie sites. In semi-shaded areas nearer the woods, it can rarely be found.

== Conservation ==
NatureServe lists it as Critically Imperiled (G1) worldwide.
