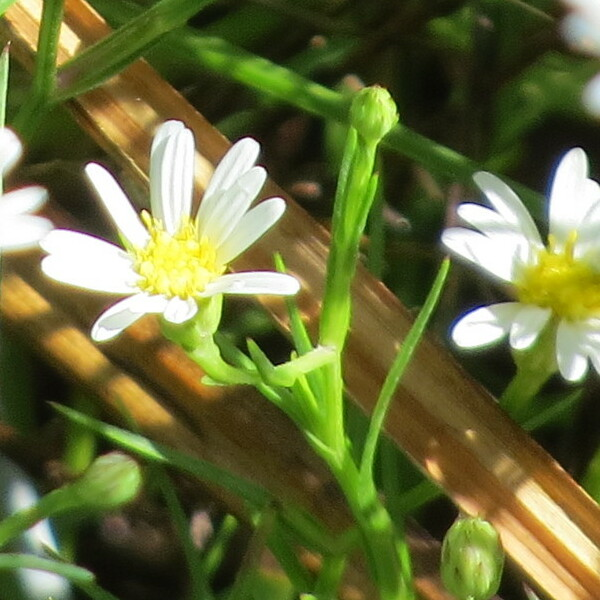
- S. potosinum growing in Cochise County, Arizona, USA

Conservation status
- Imperiled (NatureServe)

Scientific classification
- Kingdom: Plantae
- Clade: Tracheophytes
- Clade: Angiosperms
- Clade: Eudicots
- Clade: Asterids
- Order: Asterales
- Family: Asteraceae
- Tribe: Astereae
- Subtribe: Symphyotrichinae
- Genus: Symphyotrichum
- Subgenus: Symphyotrichum subg. Astropolium
- Species: S. potosinum

Binomial name
- Symphyotrichum potosinum (A.Gray) G.L.Nesom
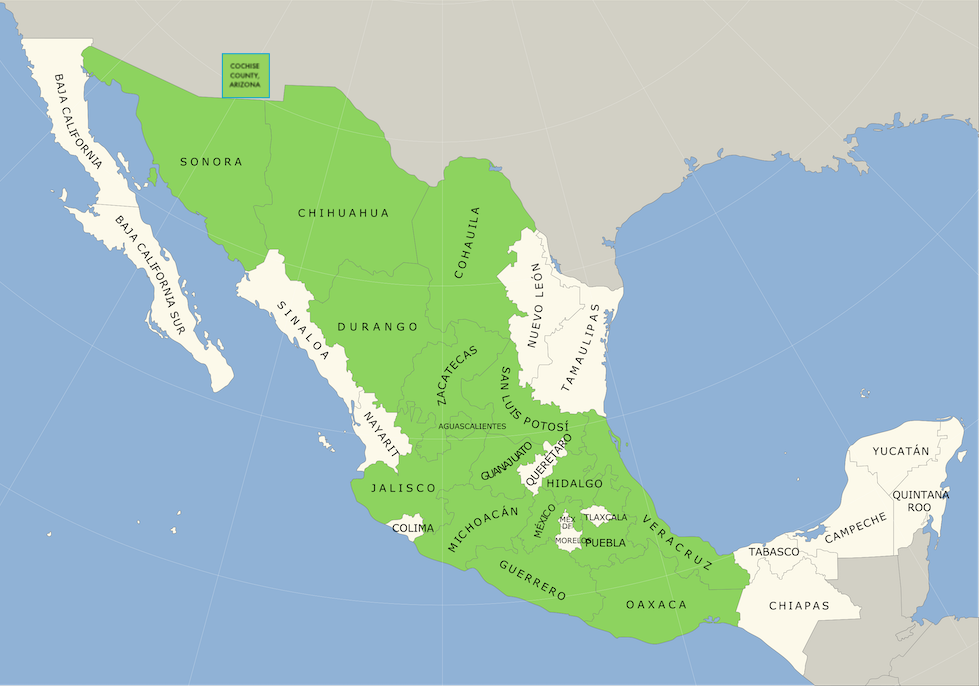
- Native distribution

Synonyms
- Aster lemmonii A.Gray; Aster potosinus A.Gray

= Symphyotrichum potosinum =

Species of flowering plant in the aster family

Symphyotrichum potosinum (formerly Aster potosinus) is a species of flowering plant in the family Asteraceae native to Mexico and the U.S. state of Arizona. Commonly known as Santa Rita Mountain aster, it is a perennial, herbaceous plant that may reach heights of 15 to 45 centimeters (6 to 18 inches).

== Description ==
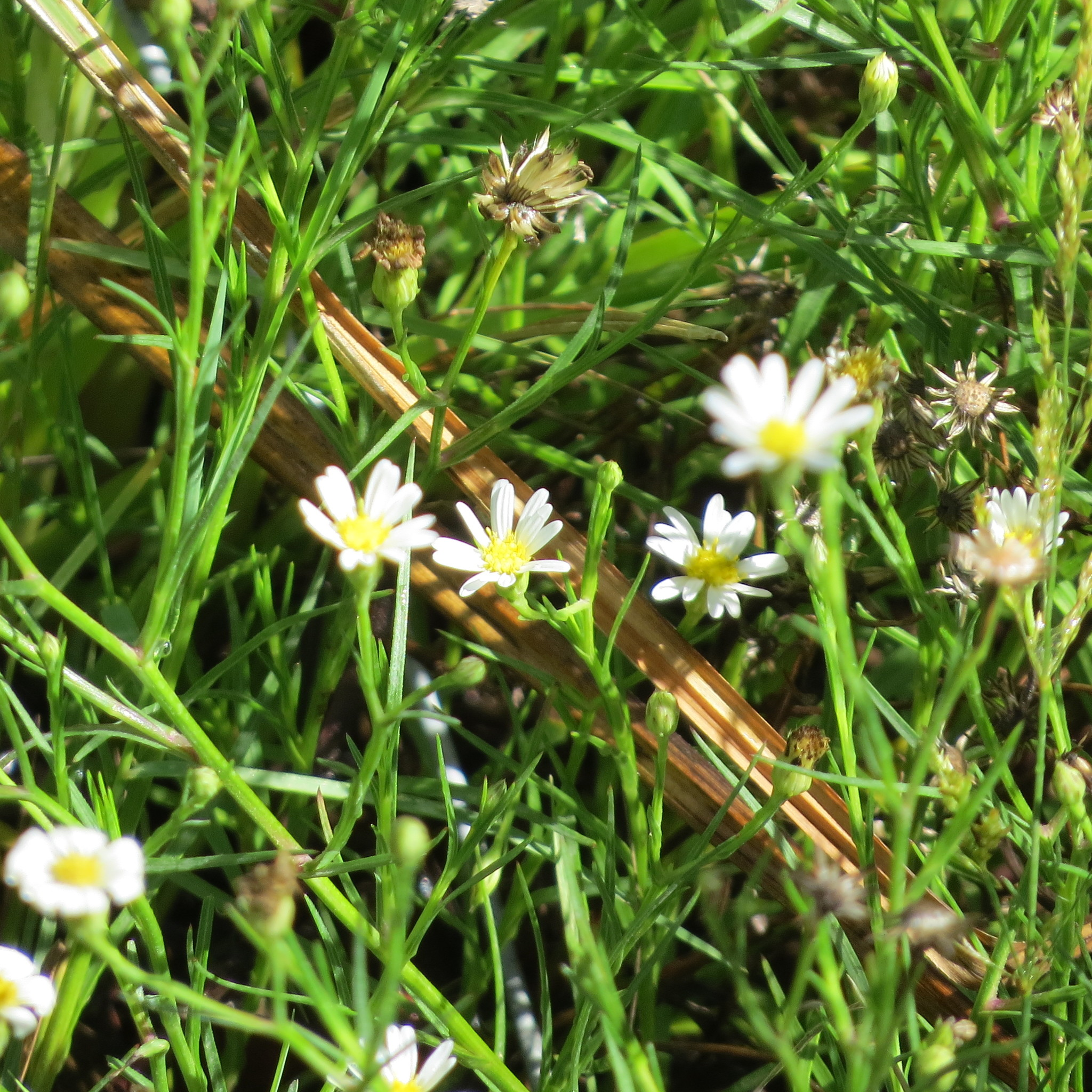
S. potosinum inflorescence growing in Cochise County, Arizona, US

Symphyotrichum potosinum is a perennial, herbaceous plant which blooms June to September. It grows from 15 to 45 centimeters (6 to 18 inches) in height, and can be either clump-forming or colonial with rhizomes in its root system. It has from one to three hairless or mostly hairless stems arising from the root base in an ascending or erect fashion. The stems are green but sometimes purple or purplish-brown. Although hairless or nearly so, the stems do have a small amount of hair at the axils where the leaves meet the stems.

=== Leaves ===
The leaves are thin and grass-like, hairless or nearly so. Those at the base have long, sheathing, sparsely ciliate petioles, and they are from 4 to 11 cm (1.6 to 4.3 in) in length and usually 5–7 millimeters in width. By the time the plant flowers, the basal leaves are usually withered, yet the stem leaves usually remain. The leaves along the stem range in length from 5 to 12 cm (2 to 5 in) and sometimes up to 18 cm (7 in). They are also grass-like and typically not as wide as those at the base, with width measurements from 1–6 mm. The leaves highest on the stem are either grass-like or awl-shaped with a tapering point, shorter from 1 to 5 cm (0.4 to 2.0 in), and very thin at only 1–2 mm wide.

=== Flowers ===
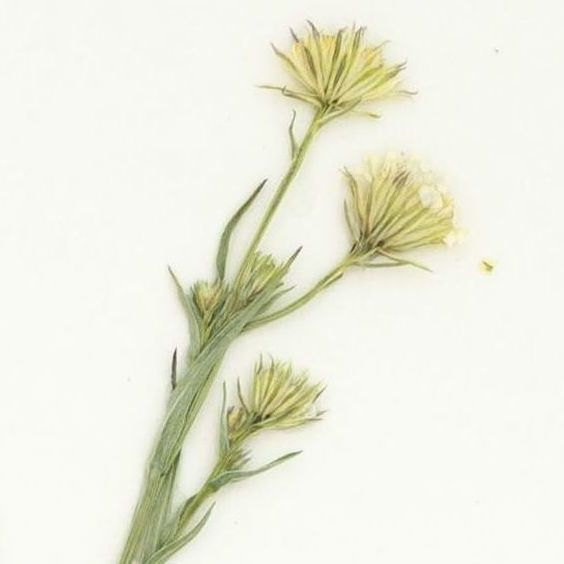
S. potosinum flower heads, pressed and dried

The inflorescences of S. potosinum consist of a usual range of 3 to 20 flower heads in paniculiform arrays with their branches growing at 45–50° angles to the stem. Each head has a 1–4 cm (0.4–1.6 in) hairless peduncle with 1–4 bracts. The involucres are cylindric to hemispheric in shape and 5–7.3 mm in length. The phyllaries are in 2–3, sometimes up to 5, series, and awl-shaped to lanceolate.

Its flowers have 14–27 white ray florets that are from 4.6 to 10.3 mm in length and 1.3–2 mm wide. There are usually 18–35 yellow disk florets with triangular spreading lobes when they bloom.

=== Chromosomes ===
Symphyotrichum potosinum has a base number of five chromosomes (x = 5) with a diploid count of 10.

== Taxonomy ==
=== History and classification ===
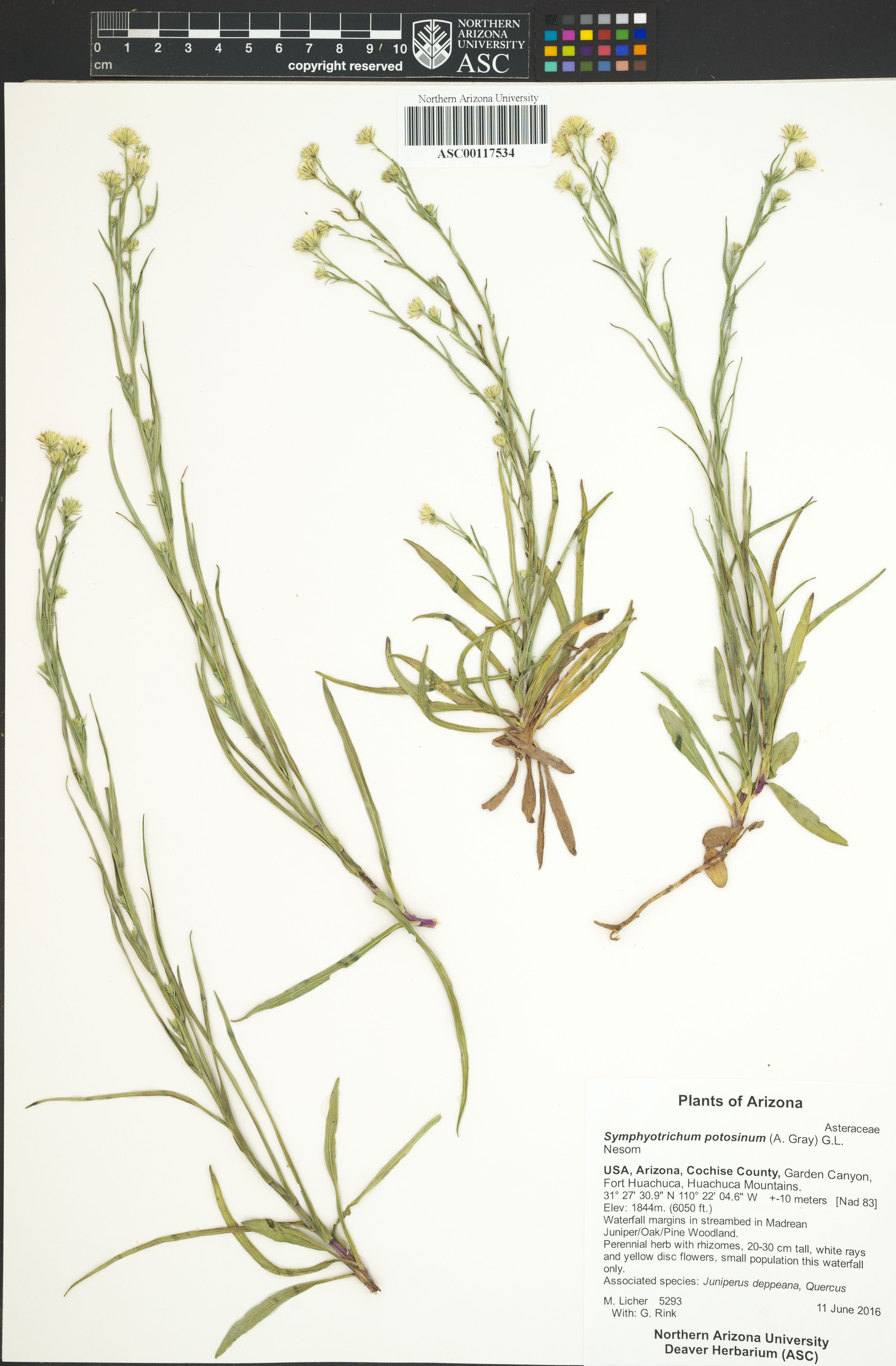
S. potosinum specimen stored at Deaver Herbarium, Northern Arizona University. Collected 11 June 2016, Garden Canyon, Fort Huachuca, Huachuca Mountains, Cochise County, Arizona, at 1,844 m (6,050 ft)

The basionym (original scientific name) of Symphyotrichum potosinum is Aster potosinus A.Gray. Its name with author citations is Symphyotrichum potosinum (A.Gray) G.L.Nesom. The species was formally described in 1880 by American botanist Asa Gray from a specimen collected by E.Palmer and C.C.Parry, (Note: British-American botanists Edward Palmer and Charles Christopher Parry) now the holotype and housed in the Gray Herbarium. It is a member of the genus Symphyotrichum classified in the subgenus Astropolium.

=== Etymology ===
The word Symphyotrichum has as its root the Greek symphysis, which means "junction", and trichos, which means "hair". The specific epithet potosinum is a Latinization of the Spanish word potosino for the Mexican state of San Luis Potosí where the holotype was found.

The species' former genus, Aster, comes from the Ancient Greek word ἀστήρ (astḗr), meaning "star", referring to the shape of the flower. The word "aster" was used to describe a star-like flower as early as 1542 in De historia stirpium commentarii insignes, a book by the German physician and botanist Leonhart Fuchs. An old common name for Astereae species using the suffix "-wort" is "starwort", also spelled "star-wort" or "star wort". An early use of this name can be found in the same work by Fuchs as Sternkraut, translated from German literally as "star herb" (Stern Kraut).

== Distribution and habitat ==
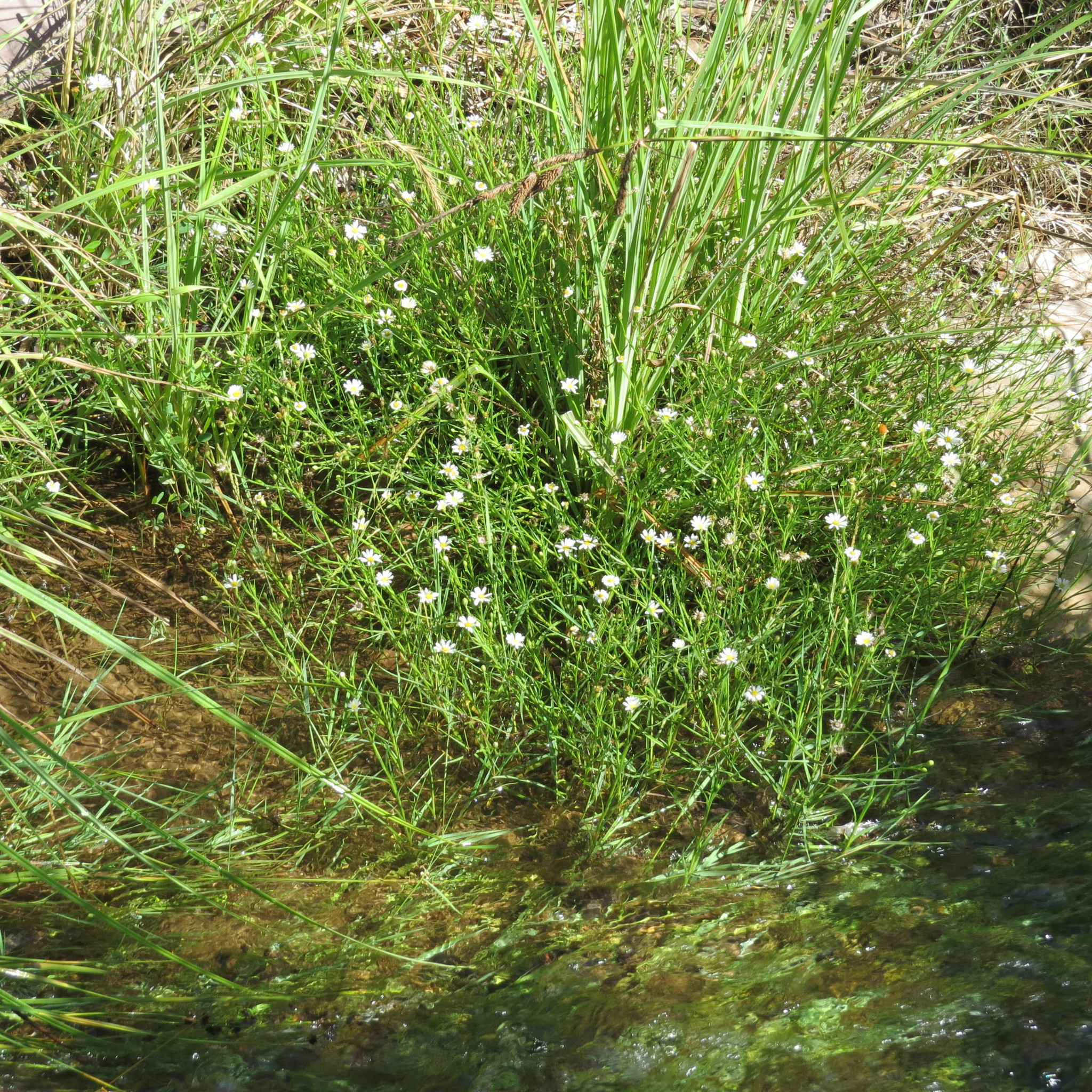
S. potosinum in a wetland habitat in Cochise County, Arizona, US

Santa Rita Mountain aster is native to Arizona and Mexico. As of October 2021, it is known in the United States only from Cochise County, Arizona. In Mexico, it has a recorded presence in the states of Aguascalientes, Chihuahua, Durango, Guanajuato, Guerrero, Hidalgo, Jalisco, México, Michoacan, Oaxaca, Puebla, San Luis Potosí, Sonora, Veracruz, and Zacatecas. It is a wetland species and grows in muddy and wet soils on stream banks in the mountains at elevations of 1,500–1,900 meters (4,900–6,200 feet).

== Conservation ==
NatureServe lists Symphyotrichum potosinum as Imperiled (G2) worldwide, and Critically Imperiled (S1) in Arizona. The species is extirpated from the Santa Rita Mountains and possibly the Chiricahua Mountains. It is threatened by road maintenance, recreation, and habitat and water supply destruction. Its global status was last reviewed by NatureServe on 15 December 2015. The species' status in Mexico is not given.
