= Nikolai Albov =

Russian botanist (1866-1897)

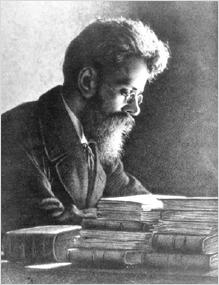
- Born: Nikolai Mikhaylovich Albov; Николай Михайлович Альбов; 15 October 1866; Pavlovo, Nizhny Novgorod Governorate, Russian Empire
- Died: 6 December 1897 (aged 31); La Plata, Argentina
- Other name: Nikolai Alboff
- Occupations: botanist, geographer, explorer.

Nikolai Mikhaylovich Albov (Russian: Николай Михайлович Альбов; 15 October 1866, in Pavlovo, Gorbatov region, Nizhny Novgorod Governorate, Imperial Russia – 6 December 1897, in La Plata, Argentina) was a Russian botanist and geographer. He made his mark first as an explorer of the Caucasus, to which he made several extensive trips financed by the Swiss Botanist Society, and later, after having moved to Argentina in 1895, of the Southern regions of South America. He is credited with being arguably the first European explorer to have traveled extensively over Patagonia and Tierra del Fuego and (writing in Russian and French), described its flora.

He had published 155 names of plant specimens.

The standard author abbreviation Albov is used to indicate this person as the author when citing a botanical name.
