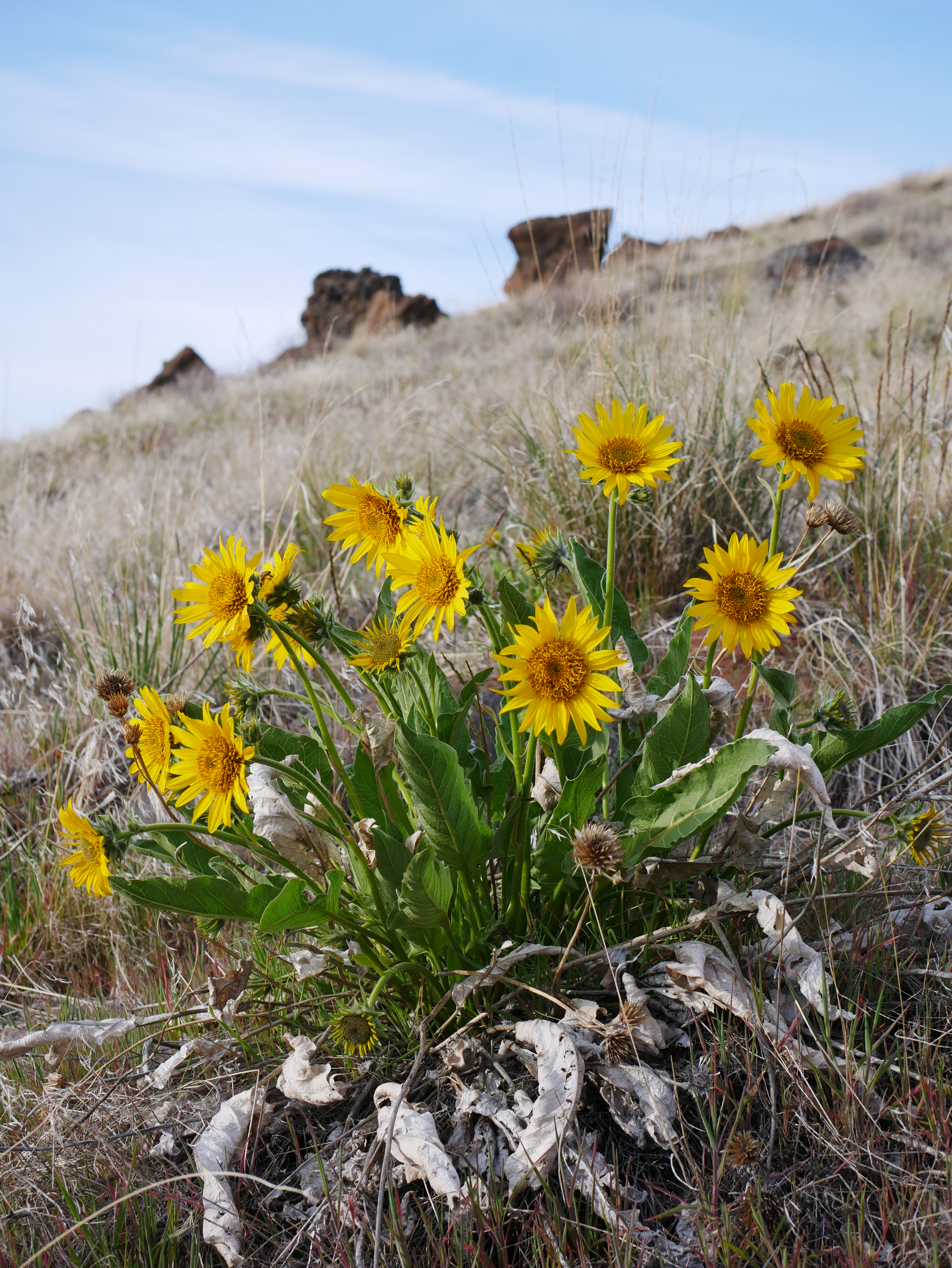
- Balsamorhiza careyana in flower in Douglas County Washington

Scientific classification
- Kingdom: Plantae
- Clade: Tracheophytes
- Clade: Angiosperms
- Clade: Eudicots
- Clade: Asterids
- Order: Asterales
- Family: Asteraceae
- Genus: Balsamorhiza
- Species: B. careyana

Binomial name
- Balsamorhiza careyana A.Gray

= Balsamorhiza careyana =

Species of flowering plant

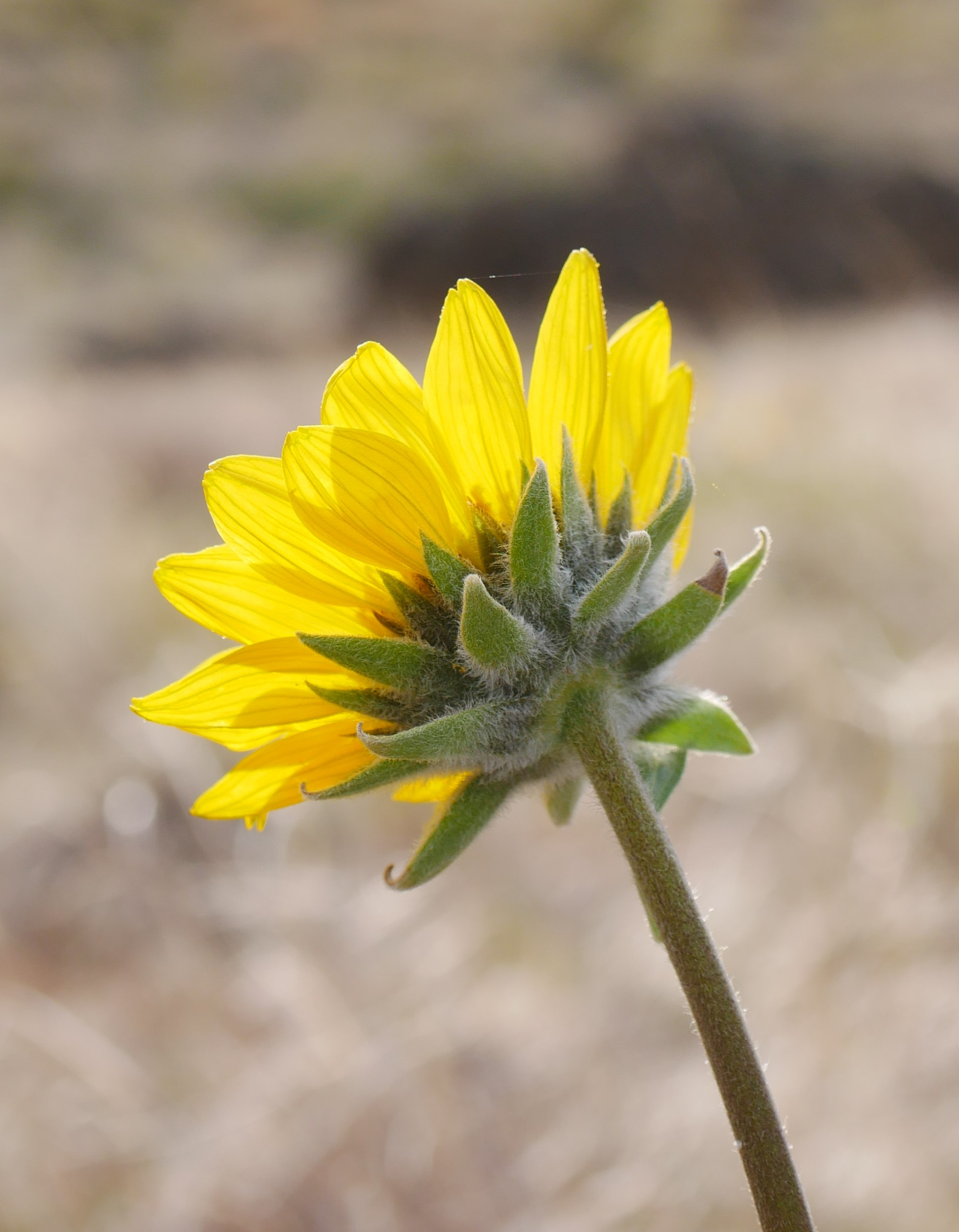
Balsamorhiza careyana- closeup of flower and sepals

Balsamorhiza careyana is a species of flowering plant in the tribe Heliantheae of the family Asteraceae known by the common name Carey's balsamroot. It is native to northwestern United States Washington and Oregon where it grows in arid and desert regions east of the Cascades. It is very similar to a close relative Balsamorhiza sagittata, but its leaves feel more fine sandpaper-like instead of soft and hairy, the involucre (flower bract) is less densely wooly, and it is probably more resistant to drought.
