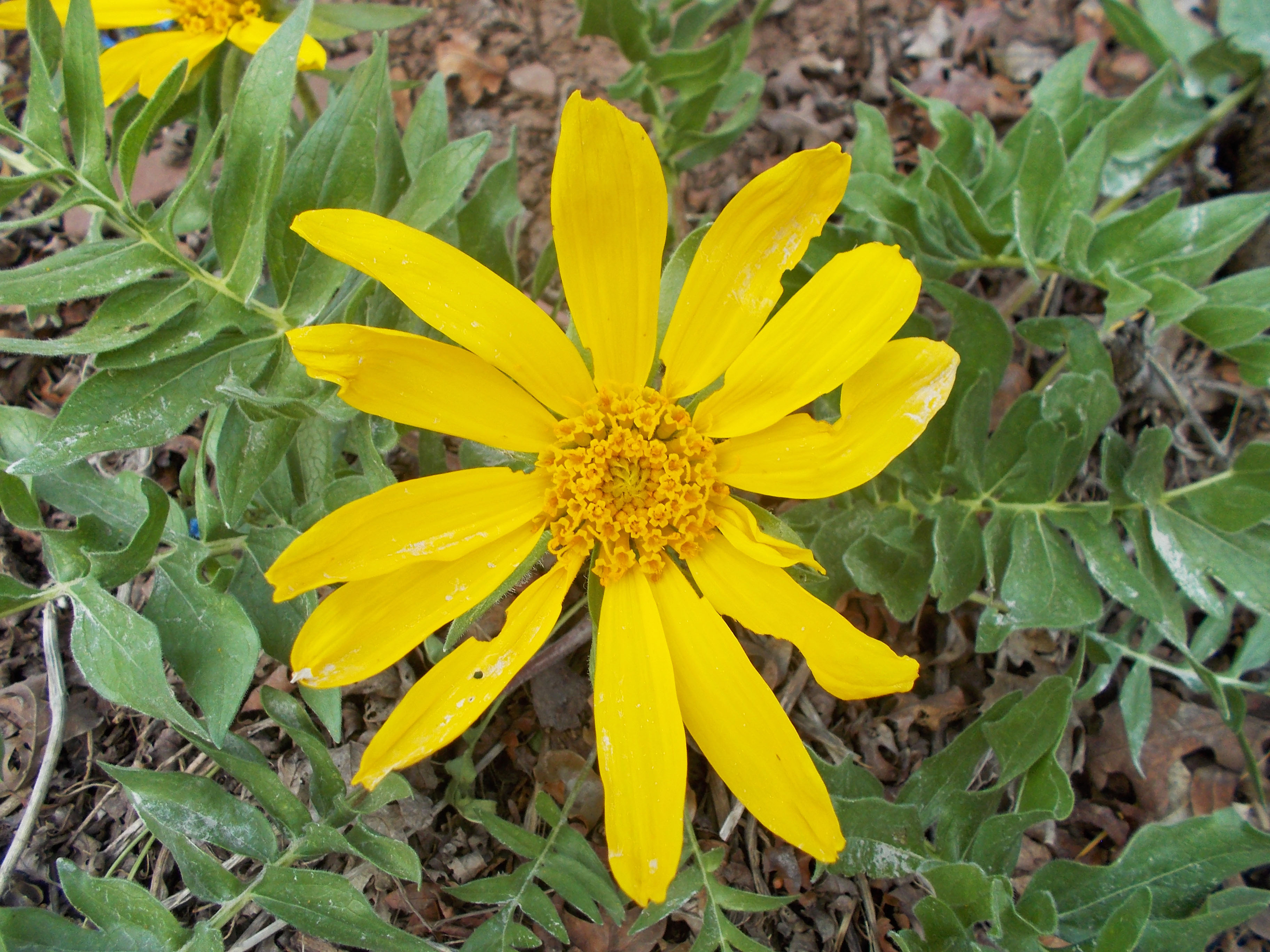

Scientific classification
- Kingdom: Plantae
- Clade: Tracheophytes
- Clade: Angiosperms
- Clade: Eudicots
- Clade: Asterids
- Order: Asterales
- Family: Asteraceae
- Genus: Balsamorhiza
- Species: B. macrophylla

Binomial name
- Balsamorhiza macrophylla Nutt.

Synonyms
- Balsamorhiza macrophylla var. idahoensis W.M.Sharp; Balsamorhiza hookeri Nuttall var. idahoensis (W.M.Sharp) Cronquist

= Balsamorhiza macrophylla =

Species of flowering plant

Balsamorhiza macrophylla (cutleaf balsamroot) is a North American species of plants in the tribe Heliantheae of the family Asteraceae. The species is native to the northwestern United States, in Idaho, Montana, Wyoming, Utah, and Oregon. It grows in sagebrush scrublands and conifer forests. It sometimes hybridizes with Balsamorhiza sagittata.

B. macrophylla grows up to 100 centimetres (39 in) tall, with leaves reaching 60 cm (24 in). It has yellow flower heads about 8–10 cm (3–4 in) in diameter, usually borne one at a time, with both ray florets and disc florets.
