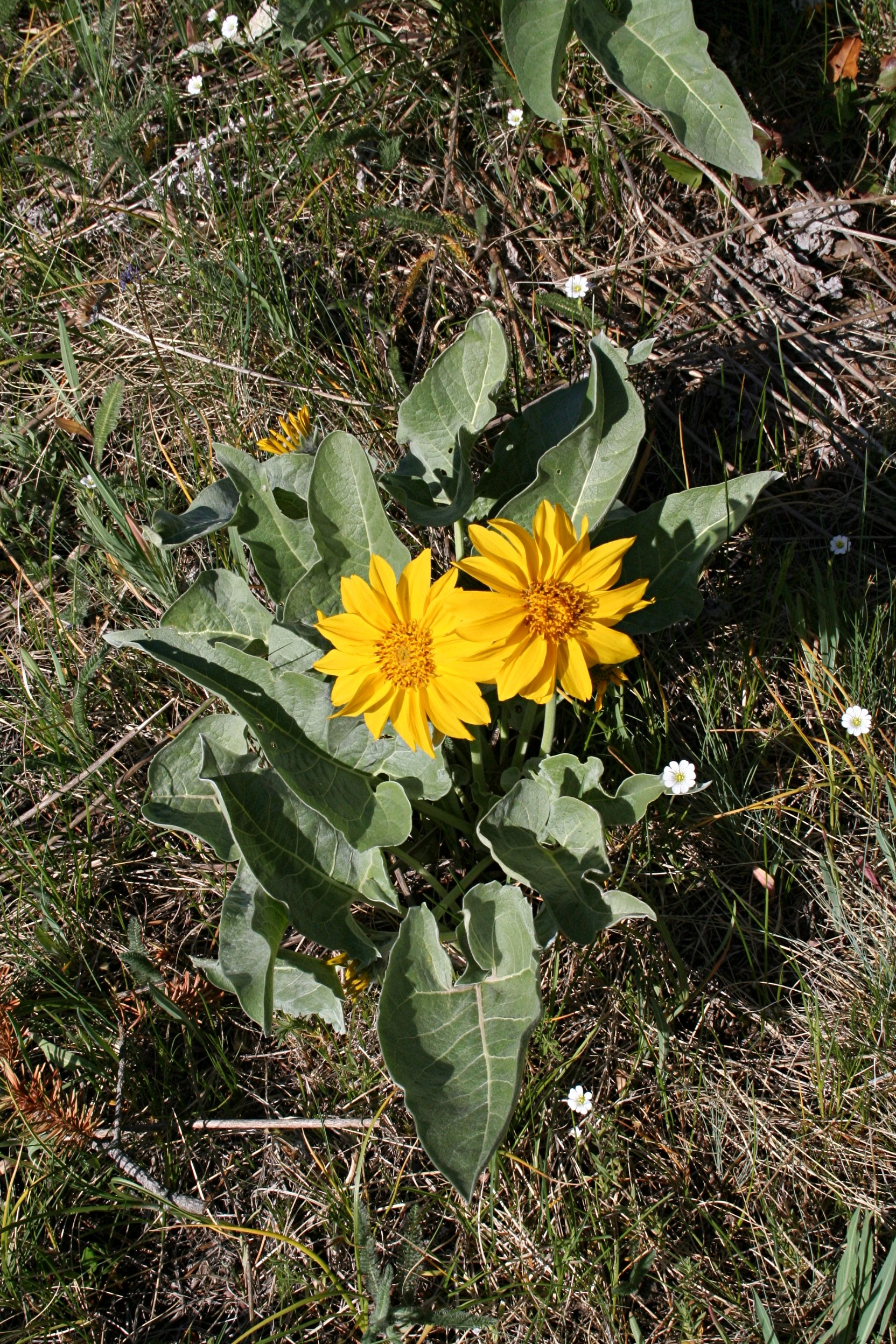
- Balsamorhiza incana

Scientific classification
- Kingdom: Plantae
- Clade: Tracheophytes
- Clade: Angiosperms
- Clade: Eudicots
- Clade: Asterids
- Order: Asterales
- Family: Asteraceae
- Genus: Balsamorhiza
- Species: B. incana

Binomial name
- Balsamorhiza incana Nutt.

Synonyms
- Balsamorhiza hookeri var. incana (Nutt.) A.Gray

= Balsamorhiza incana =

Species of plant

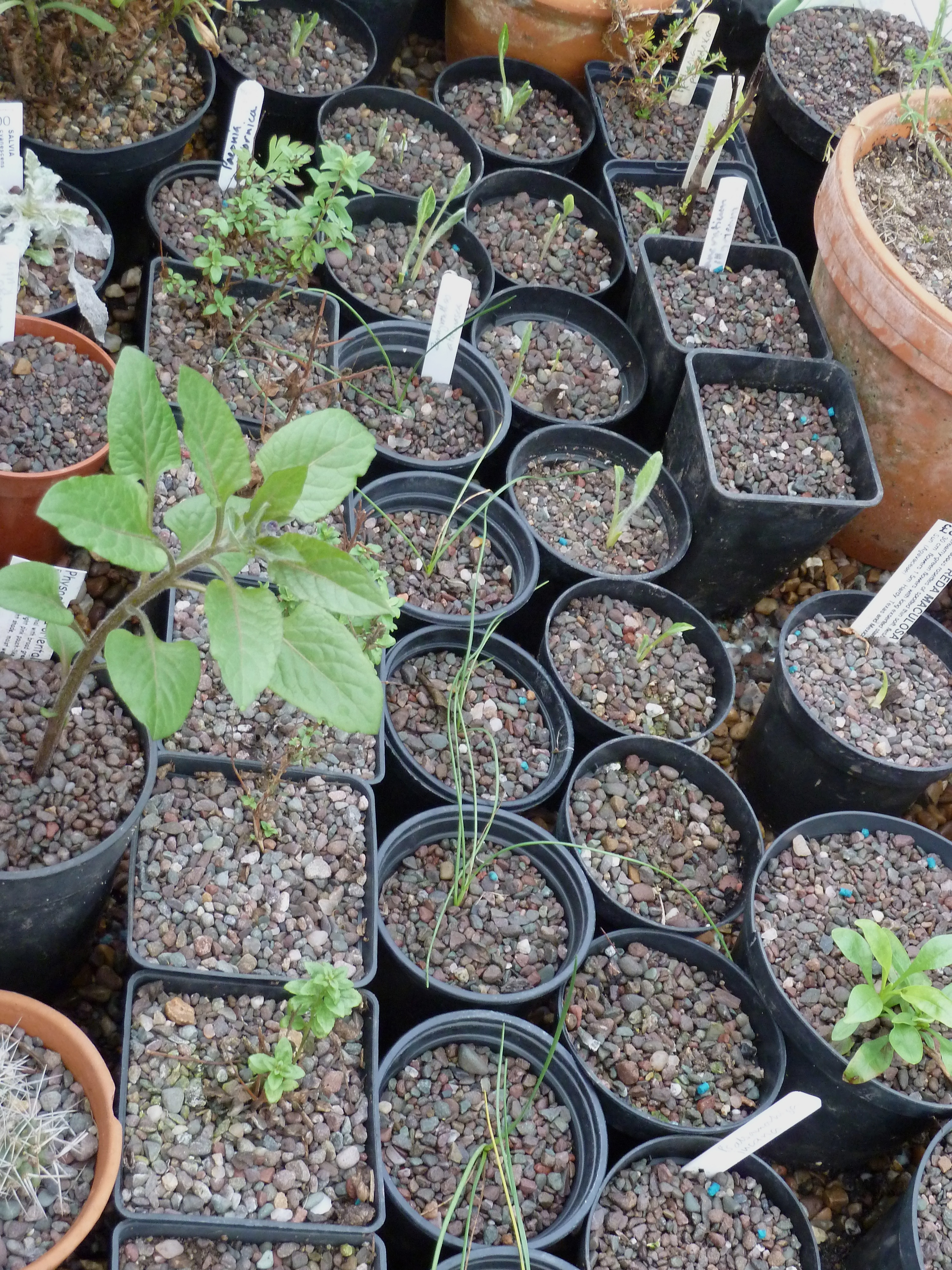
Some babies from last year including Keckiella antirrhinoides, Balsamorrhiza incana and Zephyranthes atamasco. The bigger plant is Physochlaina orientalis.

Balsamorhiza incana (hoary balsamroot) is a North American species of plants in the tribe Heliantheae of the family Asteraceae. It is native to the northwestern United States, in Idaho, Montana, Wyoming, Washington, and Oregon.

Balsamorhiza incana is an herb up to 70 cm (28 inches) tall. It has yellow flower heads, usually borne one at a time, with both ray florets and disc florets. It grows in grassy and rocky sites, often in conifer forests.
