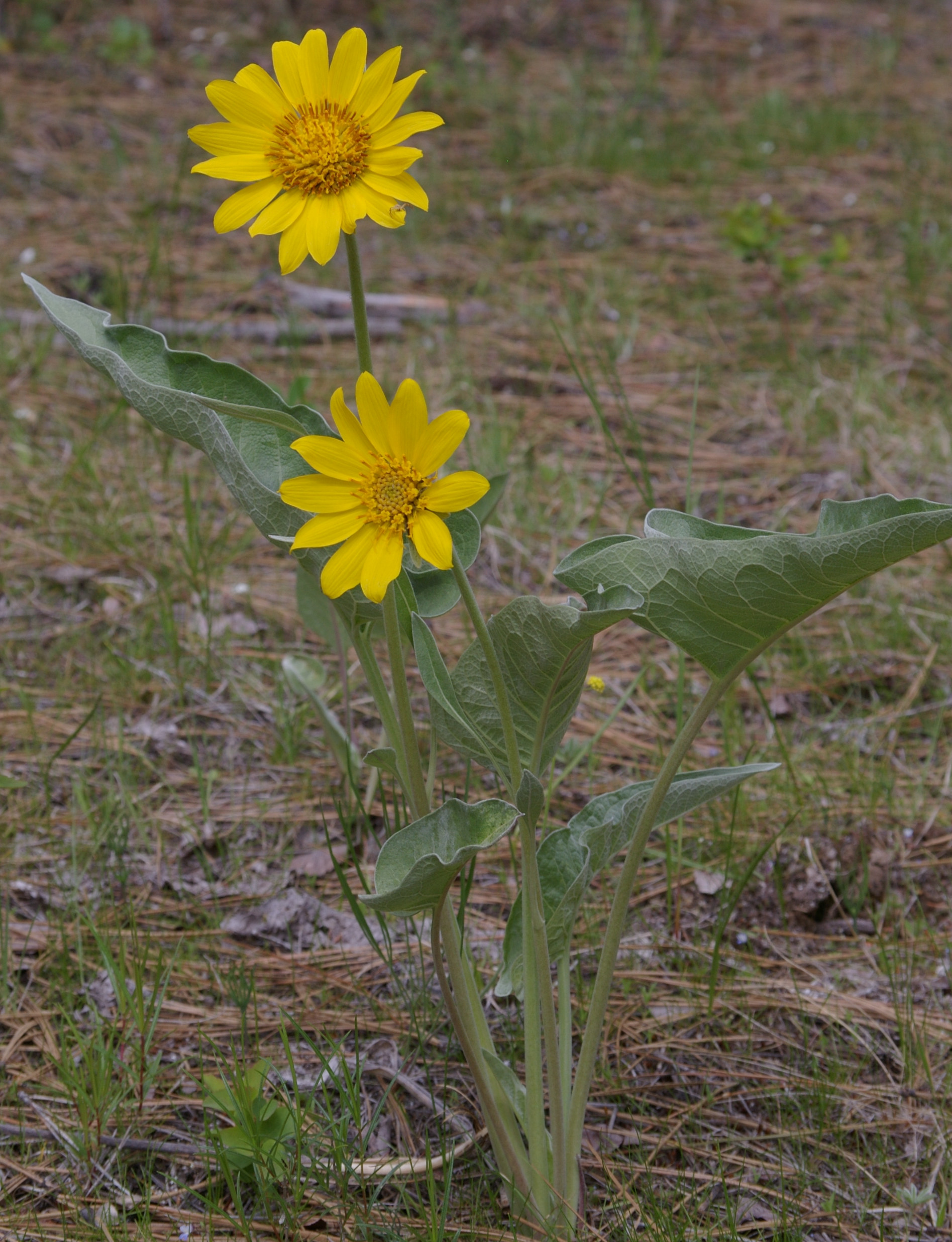
- Balsamorhiza sagittata

Scientific classification
- Kingdom: Plantae
- Clade: Tracheophytes
- Clade: Angiosperms
- Clade: Eudicots
- Clade: Asterids
- Order: Asterales
- Family: Asteraceae
- Tribe: Heliantheae
- Genus: Balsamorhiza; Hook. ex Nutt.

= Balsamorhiza =

Balsamroot

Genus of plants in the sunflower family

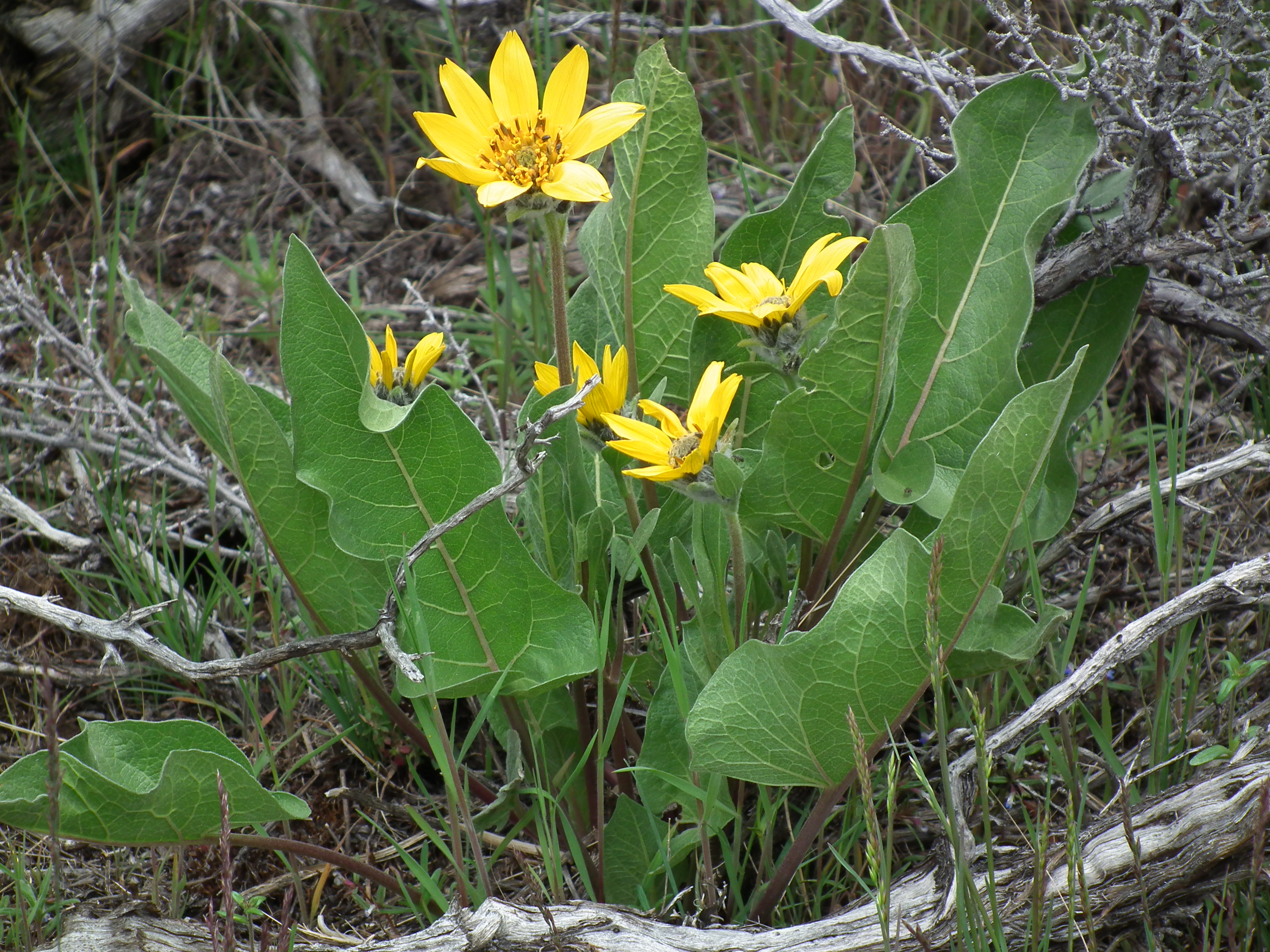
Leaves are mostly basal with long petioles, entire as in this Balsamorhiza careyana individual, or with one to three pinnate lobes

Balsamorhiza is a genus of plants in the family Asteraceae known commonly as balsamroots. These are perennials with fleshy taproots and caudices bearing erect stems and large, basal leaves. Atop the tall stems are showy yellow sunflower-like blooms. Balsamroots are native to western North America (United States and Canada).

Native Americans used the sticky sap of this plant as a topical antiseptic for minor wounds. The entire plant is edible and nutritious, but not necessarily enjoyable because it contains a bitter, strongly pine-scented sap. The large taproots produced by Balsamorhiza sagittata are edible and were harvested, dried, and ground into a starchy flour by Native Americans when other food plants were scarce. The plants' large taproots are reported to be very palatable and far less bitter than the above-ground parts of the plant.

The plant grows on dry hillsides and dry open meadows throughout the Mountain West of North America. The plant can be easily confused with species belonging to the genus Wyethia (mule's ears); and Wyethia and Balsamorhiza tend to have very similar appearances and flowering habits. Balsamorhiza species are easily distinguished from Wyethia due to their very sharply lanced leaves which lack the fuzzy silver gray appearance of Wyethia species. Balsamorhiza sagittata is the most common and widespread species in the genus within the Mountain West of North America.

Palatable to wildlife and livestock, this is a herb that decreases under grazing. Though once covering much of the arid west in spring, this common forb has become uncommon and even disappeared in some areas like the Snake River Plains. The presence of this plant can be used as an indicator of overall range health—fewer plants and flowers indicate over-utilization of pastures and/or allotments. Hillsides covered with these flowers and perennial bunchgrasses and sagebrush can quickly become wastelands of cheatgrass and tumblemustard if cattle or other stock overgraze, consuming the herb and grass energy reserves again and again until the plants individually die, while crushing their only shade.

== Species and nothospecies ==
There are about 13 species and two nothospecies:

- Balsamorhiza × bonseri - Washington State
- Balsamorhiza careyana - Carey's balsamroot - Washington, Oregon
- Balsamorhiza deltoidea - deltoid balsamroot - British Columbia, Washington, Oregon, California
- Balsamorhiza hispidula - Idaho, Montana, Wyoming, Oregon, Nevada, Colorado, Utah, Arizona
- Balsamorhiza hookeri - Hooker's balsamroot - Washington, Oregon, California, Nevada, Utah, Arizona
- Balsamorhiza incana - hoary balsamroot - Idaho, Montana, Wyoming, Oregon, Washington
- Balsamorhiza lanata - lanate balsamroot - Oregon, California
- Balsamorhiza macrolepis - California balsamroot - California
- Balsamorhiza macrophylla - cutleaf balsamroot - Idaho, Montana, Wyoming, Oregon, Utah
- Balsamorhiza rosea - rosy balsamroot - Washington, Oregon
- Balsamorhiza sagittata - arrowleaf balsamroot - British Columbia, Alberta, much of western USA
- Balsamorhiza sericea - silky balsamroot - Oregon, California
- Balsamorhiza serrata - serrate balsamroot or toothed balsamroot - Nevada, Washington, Oregon, California
- Balsamorhiza terebinthacea - Washington, Oregon, California
- Balsamorhiza × tomentosa - Idaho, Montana, Wyoming, Washington, Oregon
