= Balsamorhiza rosea =

Scientific classification
- Kingdom: Plantae
- Clade: Tracheophytes
- Clade: Angiosperms
- Clade: Eudicots
- Clade: Asterids
- Order: Asterales
- Family: Asteraceae
- Genus: Balsamorhiza
- Species: B. rosea

Binomial name
- Balsamorhiza rosea A.Nelson & J.F.Macbr.

Synonyms
- Balsamorhiza hookeri var. rosea (A.Nelson & J.F.Macbr.) W.M.Sharp

Species of flowering plant

Balsamorhiza rosea (rosy balsamroot) is a North American species of plants in the sunflower tribe within the aster family. It is native to the northwestern United States, in Washington and Oregon.

Balsamorhiza rosea is an herb up to 30 cm (12 inches) tall. It has flower heads, usually borne one at a time, with both ray florets and disc florets. Ray florets are yellow at flowering time but turn red as they age. The species grows on dry hillsides.
