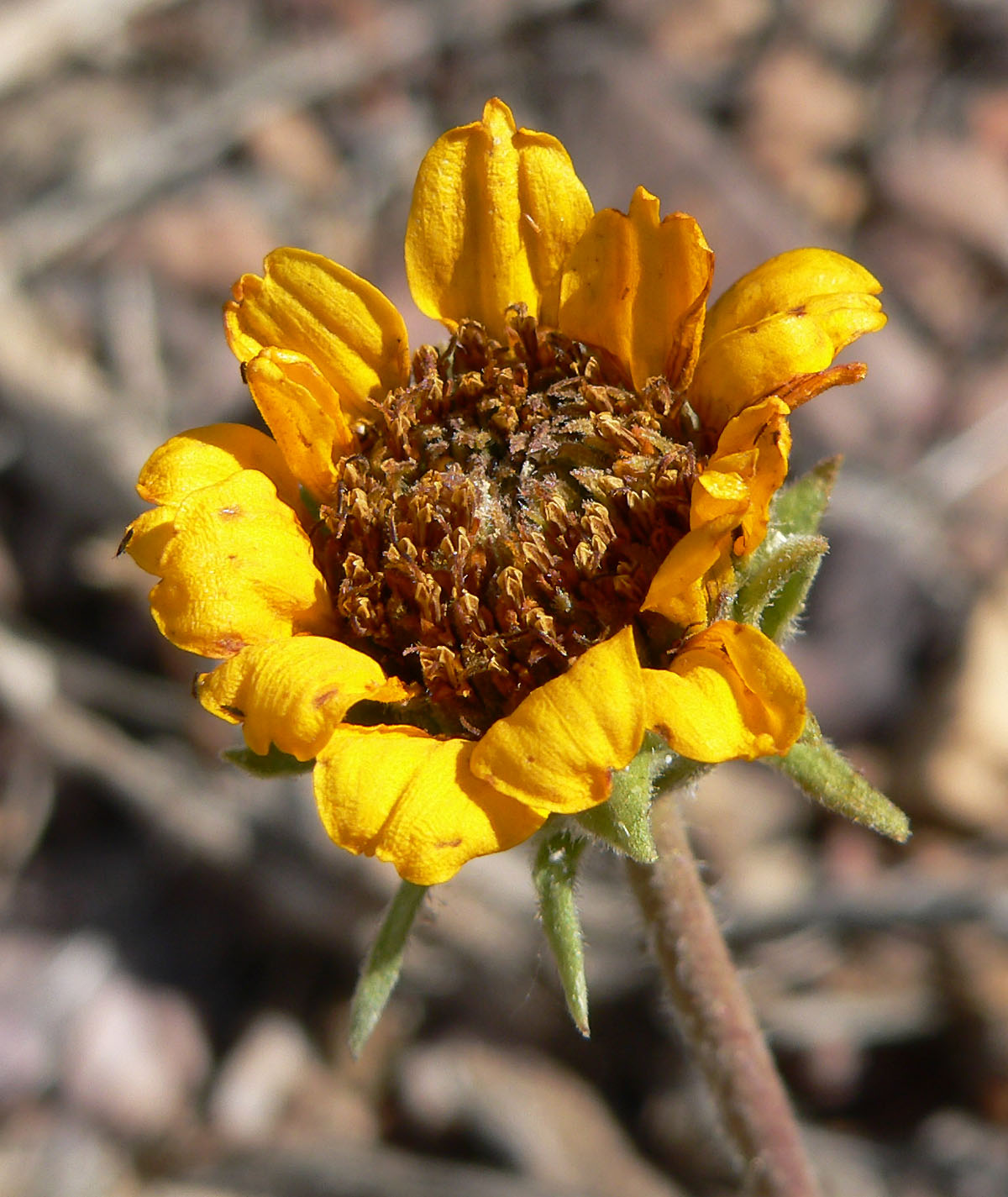

Conservation status
- Apparently Secure (NatureServe)

Scientific classification
- Kingdom: Plantae
- Clade: Tracheophytes
- Clade: Angiosperms
- Clade: Eudicots
- Clade: Asterids
- Order: Asterales
- Family: Asteraceae
- Genus: Balsamorhiza
- Species: B. hispidula

Binomial name
- Balsamorhiza hispidula W.M.Sharp

Synonyms
- Balsamorhiza hookeri var. hispidula Cronquist

= Balsamorhiza hispidula =

Species of flowering plant

Balsamorhiza hispidula is a North American species of plants in the sunflower tribe within the aster family. It is native to western United States, primarily the Great Basin and other dry, relatively flat terrain. It has been found in Idaho, Montana, Wyoming, Oregon, Nevada, Colorado, Utah, and Arizona.

Balsamorhiza hispidula is an herb up to 40 cm (16 inches) tall. It has yellow flower heads, usually borne one at a time, with both ray florets and disc florets.
