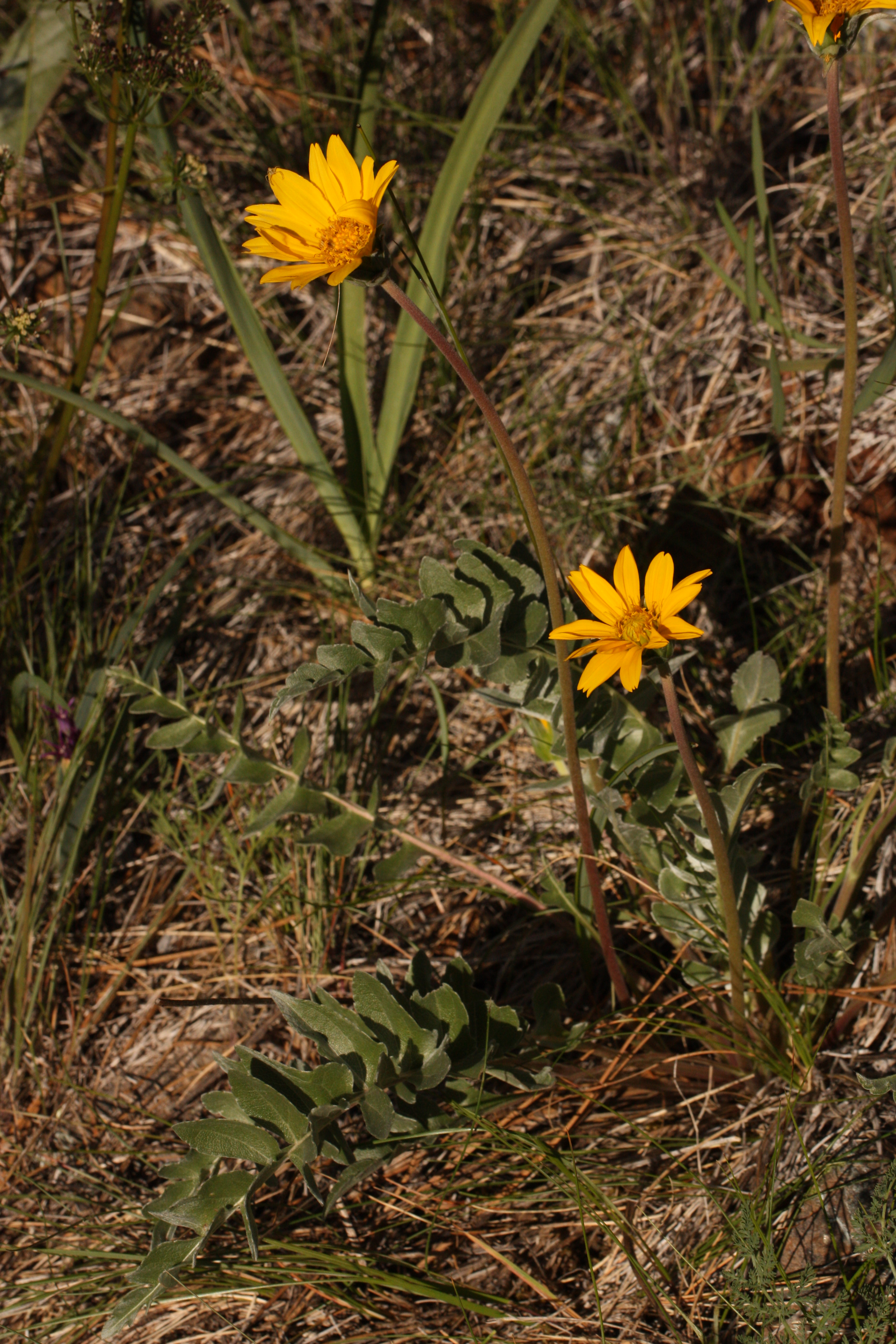

Scientific classification
- Kingdom: Plantae
- Clade: Tracheophytes
- Clade: Angiosperms
- Clade: Eudicots
- Clade: Asterids
- Order: Asterales
- Family: Asteraceae
- Genus: Balsamorhiza
- Species: B. sericea

Binomial name
- Balsamorhiza sericea W.A.Weber

= Balsamorhiza sericea =

Species of flowering plant

Balsamorhiza sericea is a species of flowering plant in the tribe Heliantheae of the family Asteraceae known by the common name silky balsamroot. It is native to the Klamath Mountains of northwestern California and southwestern Oregon, with additional populations in the Blue and Steens Mountains in eastern Oregon. It grows in rocky areas, sometimes on serpentine soils.

== Description ==
Balsamorhiza sericea is a taprooted perennial herb growing erect 20 to 40 centimeters (8-16 inches) tall. The leaves are mostly located at the base of the plant. They are vaguely fern-like, with each leaf being composed of many pairs of oppositely-arranged lobes. Each lobe is oval and coated in silvery hairs.

The inflorescence bears a single flower head with a center of yellow disc florets and a fringe of yellow ray florets each 2 or 3 centimeters long. The fruit is an achene just over half a centimeter long.
