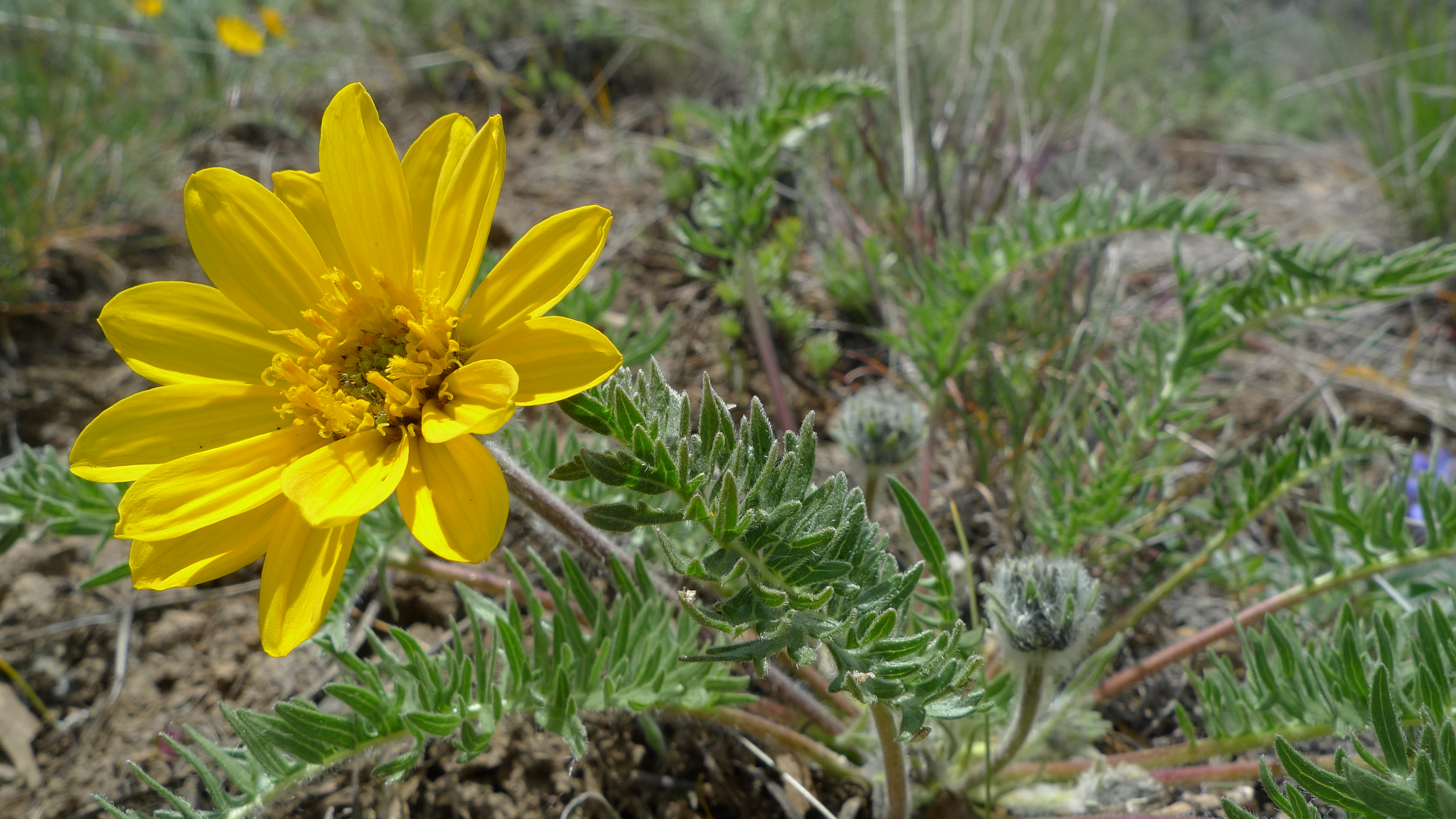
- Balsamorhiza hookeri in flower on Badger Mountain, Douglas County Washington

Scientific classification
- Kingdom: Plantae
- Clade: Tracheophytes
- Clade: Angiosperms
- Clade: Eudicots
- Clade: Asterids
- Order: Asterales
- Family: Asteraceae
- Genus: Balsamorhiza
- Species: B. hookeri

Binomial name
- Balsamorhiza hookeri (Pursh) Nutt.

Synonyms
- Balsamorhiza balsamorhiza (Hook.) A.Heller; Balsamorhiza hirsuta Nutt.; Balsamorhiza platylepis W.M.Sharp; Heliopsis balsamorhiza Hook.

= Balsamorhiza hookeri =

Species of flowering plant

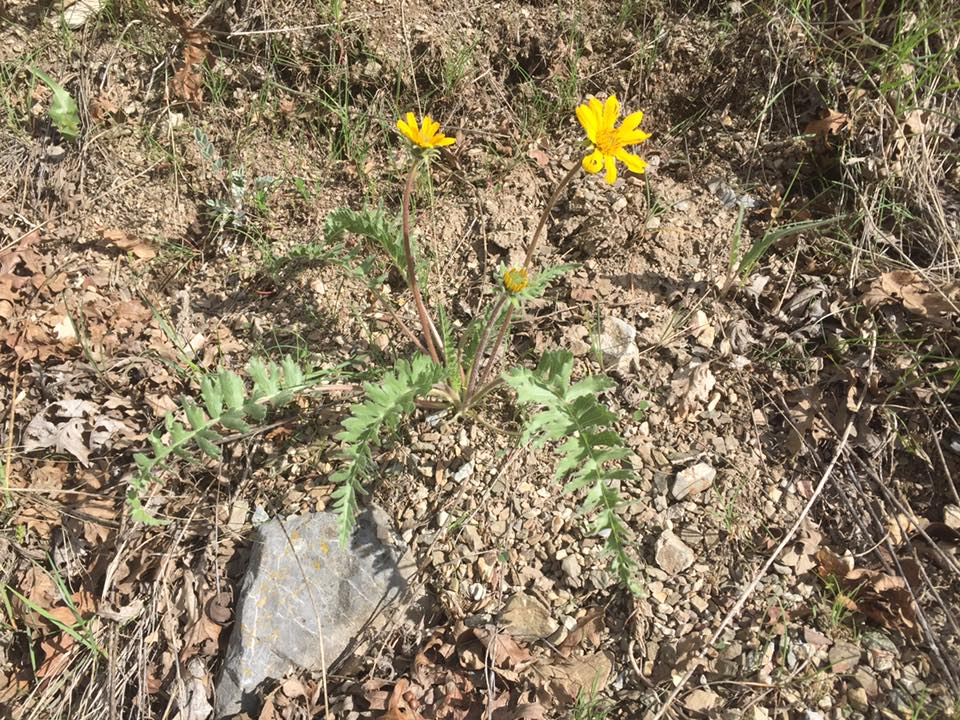
Balsamorhiza hookeri, photographed in the Wasatch foothills, Provo, Utah.

Balsamorhiza hookeri (Hooker's balsamroot) is a North American species of perennial plant in the family Asteraceae. It grows in the Great Basin and neighboring regions in the Western United States. It is found in Washington, Oregon, California, Idaho, Nevada, Utah, and Arizona.

== Description ==
The leaves are compound pinnate, with the leaflet divisions also divided or deeply lobed. Basal leaves are hairy and may be up to 16 inches (41 cm) long. There may be one to several stems, which are leafless and hairy, and topped by one flower each.

It blooms from April to July. Flower heads are 1 to 3 inches (2.5 to 7.6 cm) wide, and sunflower-like, with 10–21 fringe-tipped ray flowers and numerous disc flowers. The flower bract has long hairs.

== Distribution and habitat ==
It grows to 9,000 feet (2,700 m) in dry, grassy meadows in sagebrush steppe and montane plant communities in the Great Basin. It is common at much lower elevations in central Washington State scablands.

== Ecology ==
It tends to grow in rockier habitats than its cousin, arrow-leaf balsamroot (Balsamorhiza sagittata). It hybridizes with arrow-leaf balsamroot, which has arrow shaped leaves. The result is a plant with leaves that are arrow shaped, but also deeply divided.

== Uses ==
Balsamroots have been used as food and medicine by native peoples for many years.

== Gallery ==
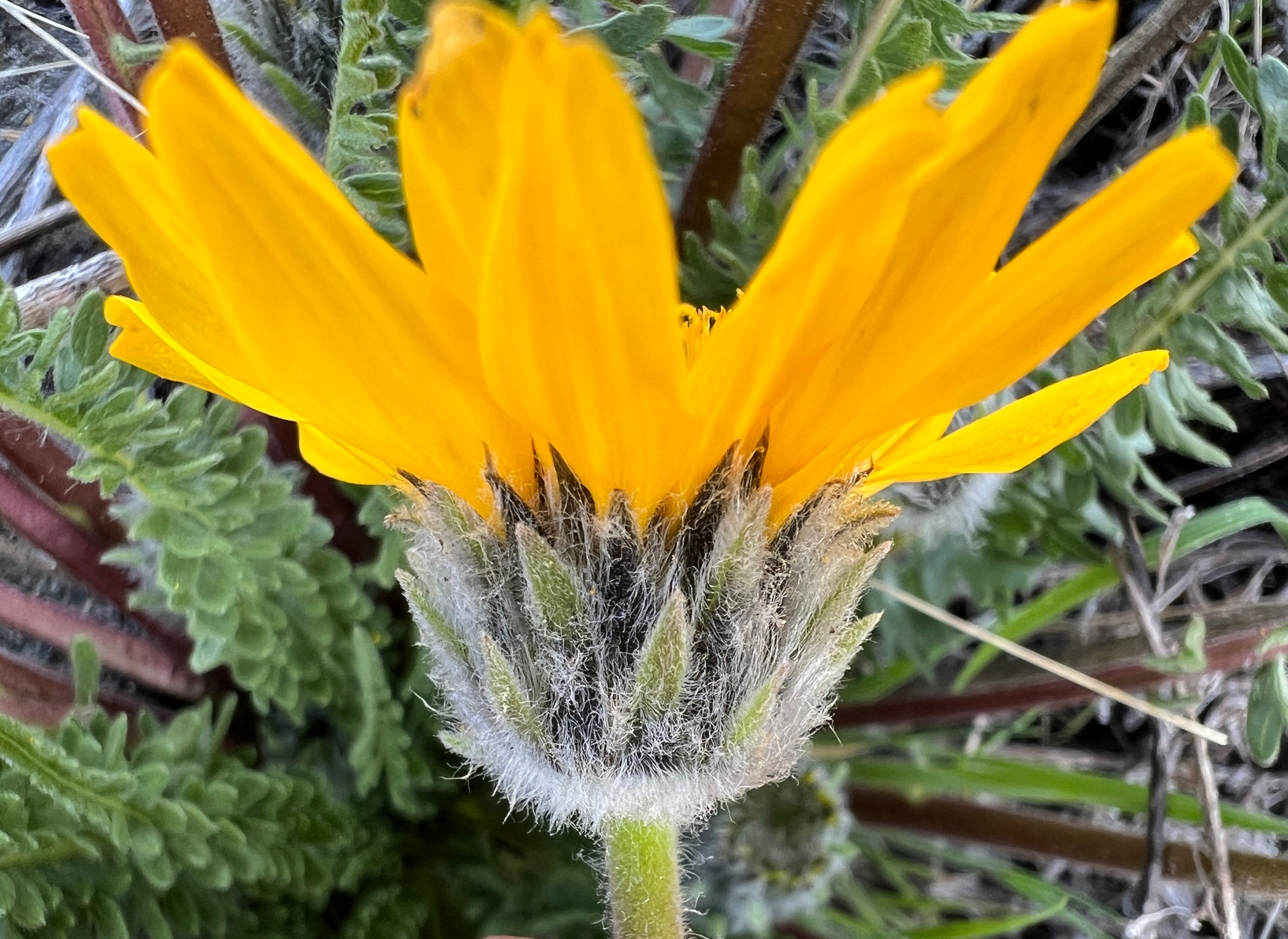
Flower side view

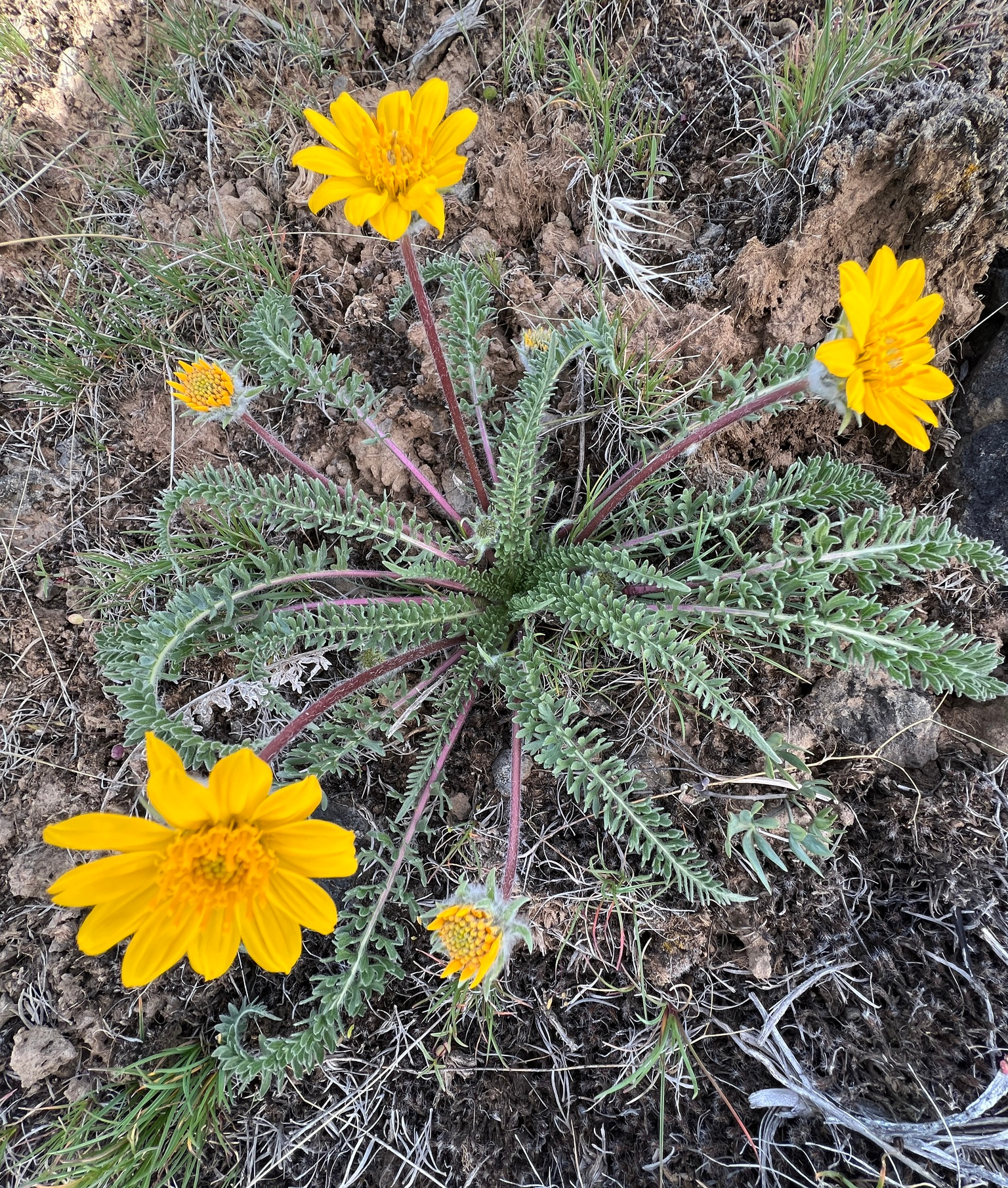
Plant top view
