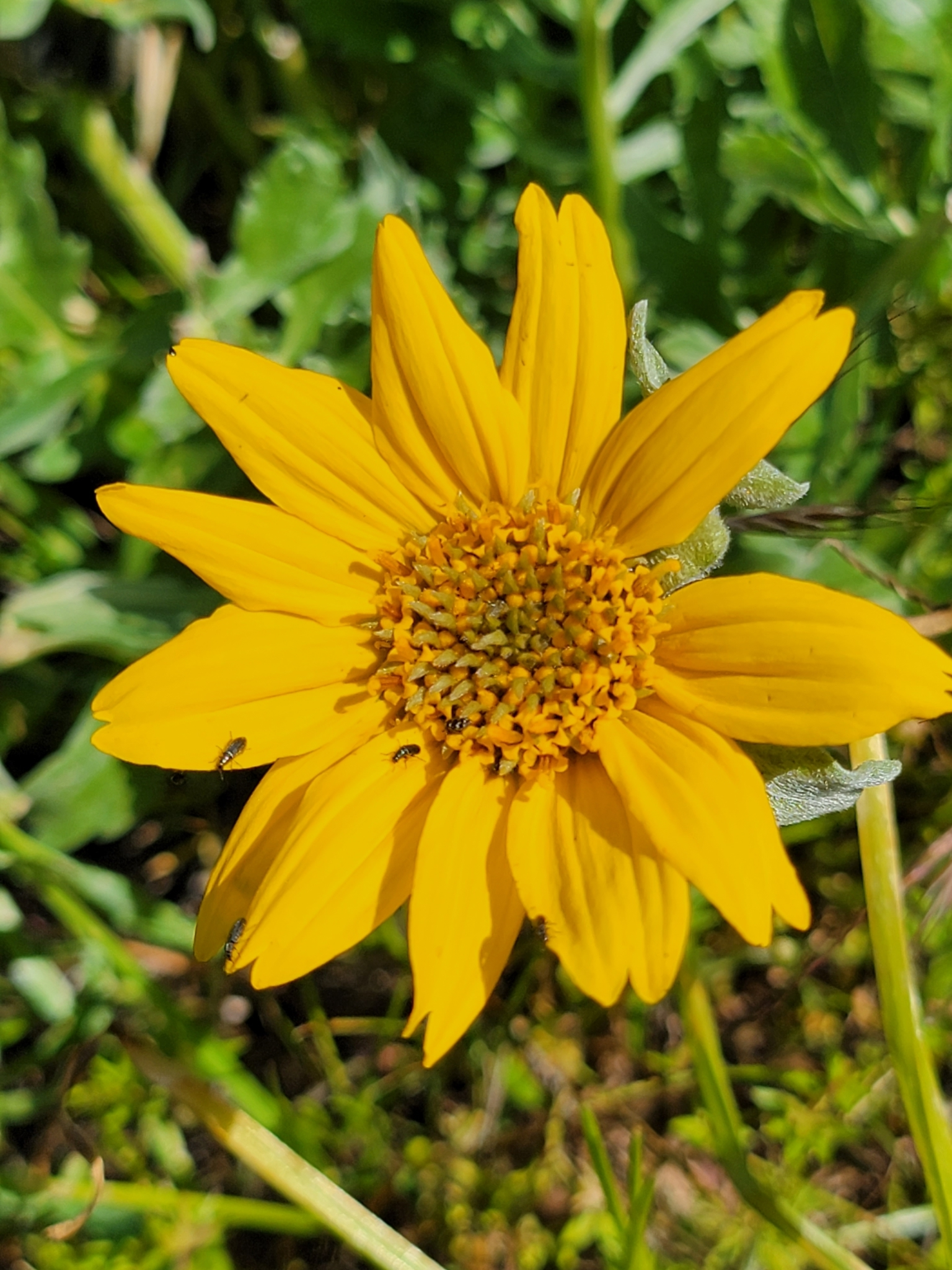

Conservation status
- Imperiled (NatureServe)

Scientific classification
- Kingdom: Plantae
- Clade: Tracheophytes
- Clade: Angiosperms
- Clade: Eudicots
- Clade: Asterids
- Order: Asterales
- Family: Asteraceae
- Genus: Balsamorhiza
- Species: B. macrolepis

Binomial name
- Balsamorhiza macrolepis W.M.Sharp

= Balsamorhiza macrolepis =

Species of flowering plant

Balsamorhiza macrolepis is a species of flowering plant in the tribe Heliantheae of the family Asteraceae, known by the common name California balsamroot. It is found only in California, where it grows in dry, open habitat, mostly in mountainous areas, mostly in the western foothills of the Sierra Nevada and in the eastern Coast Ranges near San Francisco Bay. It is now becoming rare in the Coast Ranges.

== Description ==
Balsamorhiza macrolepis is a taprooted perennial herb growing erect 20-60 centimeters tall. The large lobed leaves are lance-shaped to oval and the largest, generally toward the base of the plant, may approach 50 centimeters (20 inches) in length. They are bright to dull grayish-green and coated in fine hairs.

The inflorescence bears a single flower head lined with hairy, glandular phyllaries up to 4 centimeters long. The head has a center of yellowish disc florets and a fringe of pointed yellow ray florets each 2-3 centimeters long.
