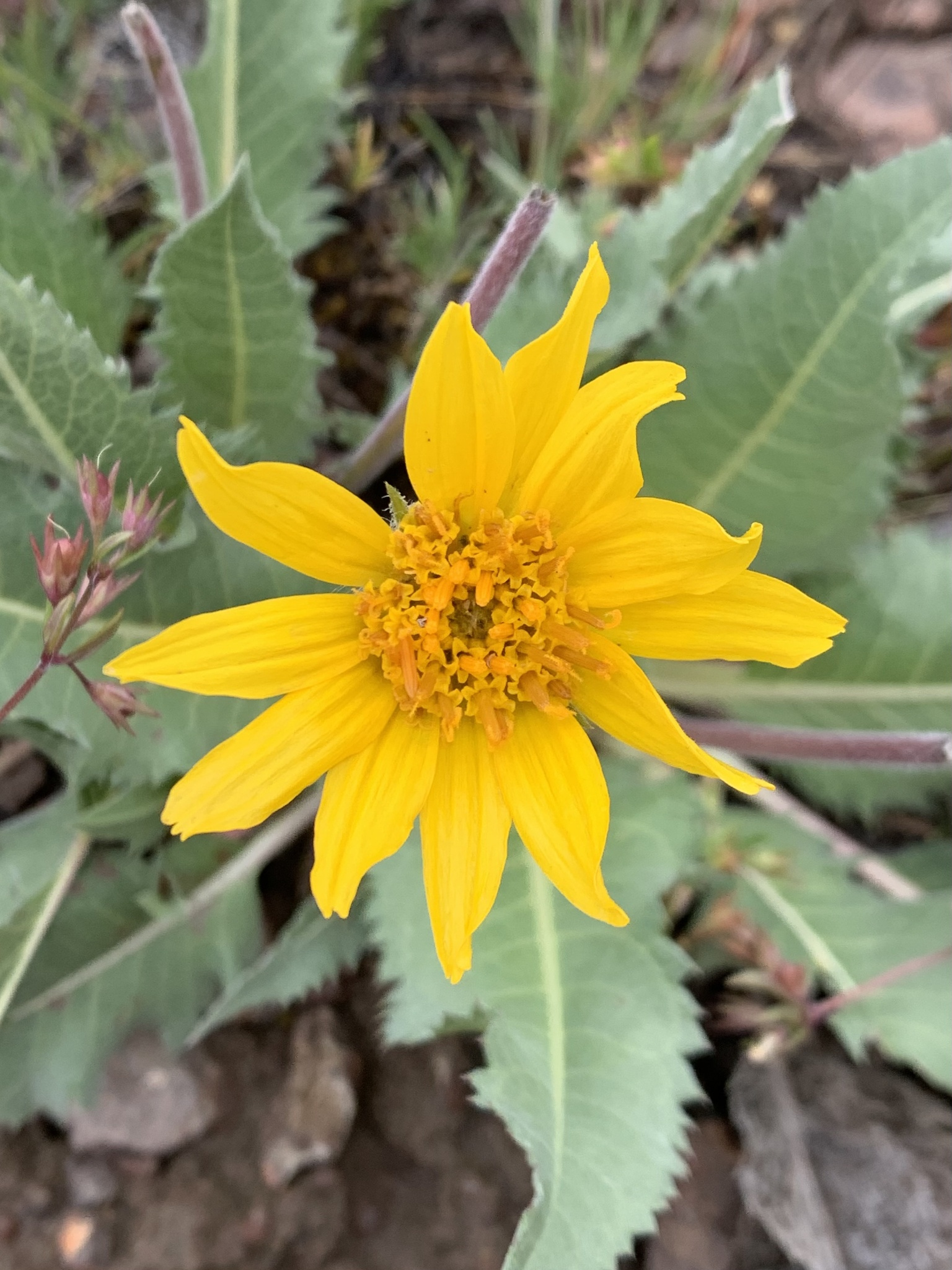

Scientific classification
- Kingdom: Plantae
- Clade: Tracheophytes
- Clade: Angiosperms
- Clade: Eudicots
- Clade: Asterids
- Order: Asterales
- Family: Asteraceae
- Genus: Balsamorhiza
- Species: B. serrata

Binomial name
- Balsamorhiza serrata Nutt.

= Balsamorhiza serrata =

Species of flowering plant

Balsamorhiza serrata, the serrate balsamroot, is a North American species of plants in the tribe Heliantheae of the family Asteraceae.

== Distribution and habitat ==
The plant is native to the Western United States, including the Great Basin region.

It has been found in Washington, Oregon, northern Nevada, and the Modoc Plateau in Modoc County of northeastern California. It grows in dry, rocky knolls and rock outcrops.

== Description ==
Balsamorhiza serrata is an herb up to 30 cm (12 inches) tall. Leaves have teeth along the edges, hence the name "serrata."

It has yellow flower heads, usually borne one at a time, with both ray florets and disc florets.
