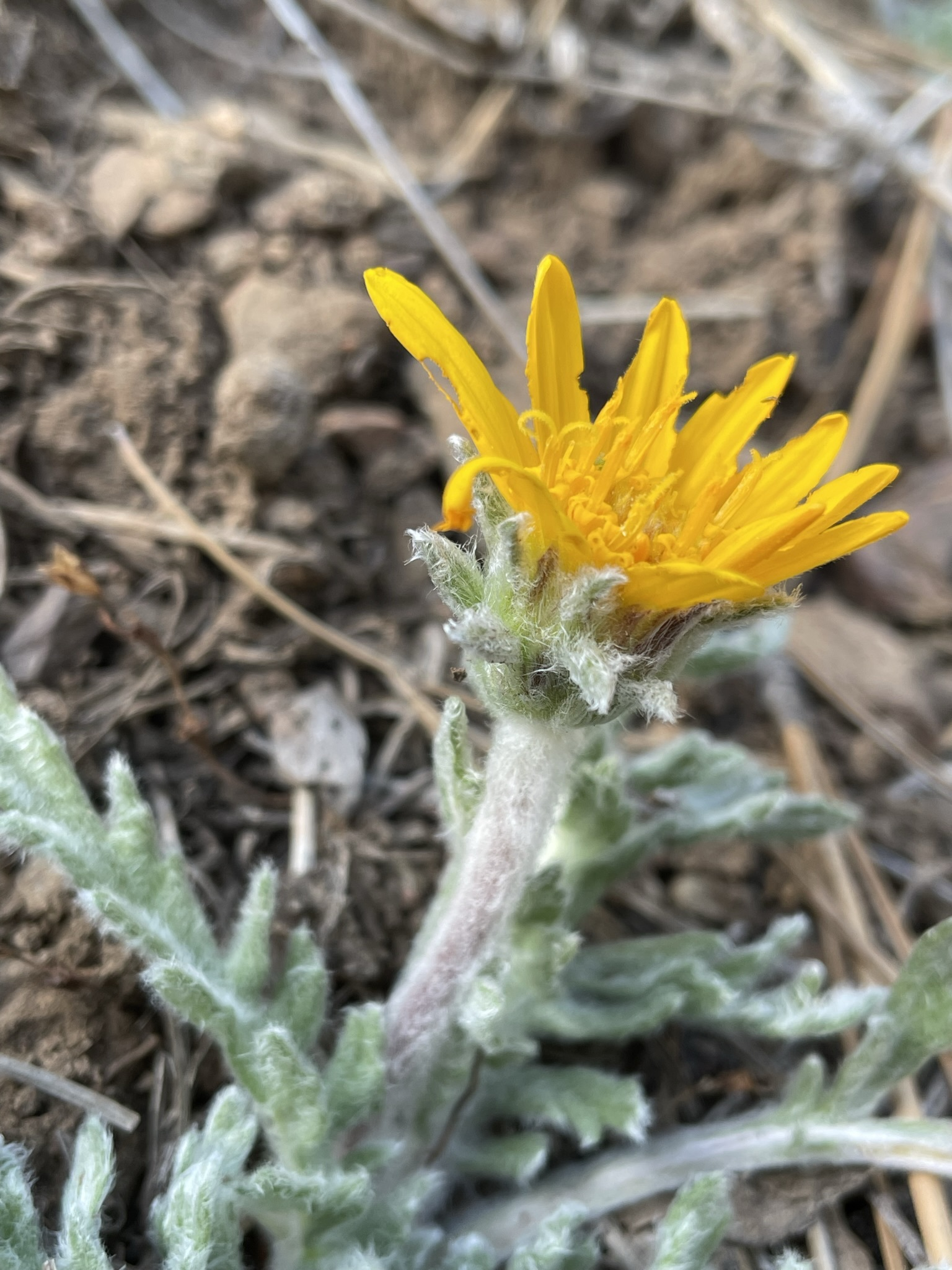

Conservation status
- Vulnerable (NatureServe)

Scientific classification
- Kingdom: Plantae
- Clade: Tracheophytes
- Clade: Angiosperms
- Clade: Eudicots
- Clade: Asterids
- Order: Asterales
- Family: Asteraceae
- Genus: Balsamorhiza
- Species: B. lanata

Binomial name
- Balsamorhiza lanata (W.M.Sharp) W.A.Weber

Synonyms
- Balsamorhiza hookeri var. lanata W.M.Sharp

= Balsamorhiza lanata =

Species of flowering plant

Balsamorhiza lanata, with the common name lanate balsamroot, is a species of plant in the tribe Heliantheae of the family Asteraceae native to California.

== Distribution ==
The plant is endemic to Northern California. It is only found within Siskiyou County, in the Scott Mountains of the Klamath Range, and the Shasta Valley Mountains of the southern Cascade Range.

The species grows on grassy areas on hillsides and road embankments

== Description ==
Balsamorhiza lanata is an herb up to 30 cm (12 inches) tall. Leaves are covered with dense hairs resembling wool, so they look white.

It has yellow flower heads, usually borne one at a time, with both ray florets and disc florets.
