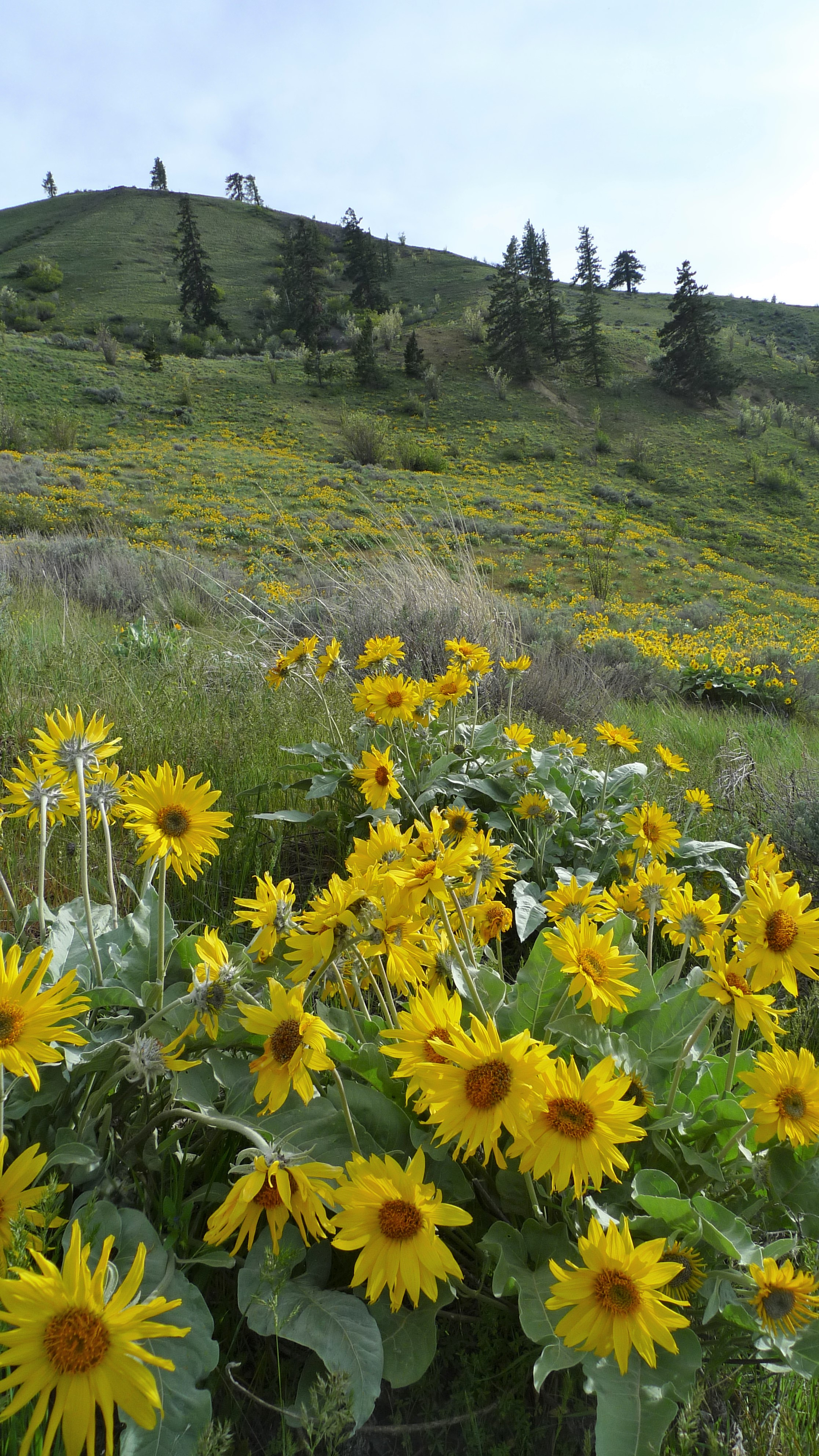
- Balsamorhiza sagittata (near Horselake, Chelan County, Washington)

Conservation status
- Secure (NatureServe)

Scientific classification
- Kingdom: Plantae
- Clade: Tracheophytes
- Clade: Angiosperms
- Clade: Eudicots
- Clade: Asterids
- Order: Asterales
- Family: Asteraceae
- Tribe: Heliantheae
- Genus: Balsamorhiza
- Species: B. sagittata

Binomial name
- Balsamorhiza sagittata (Pursh) Nutt.
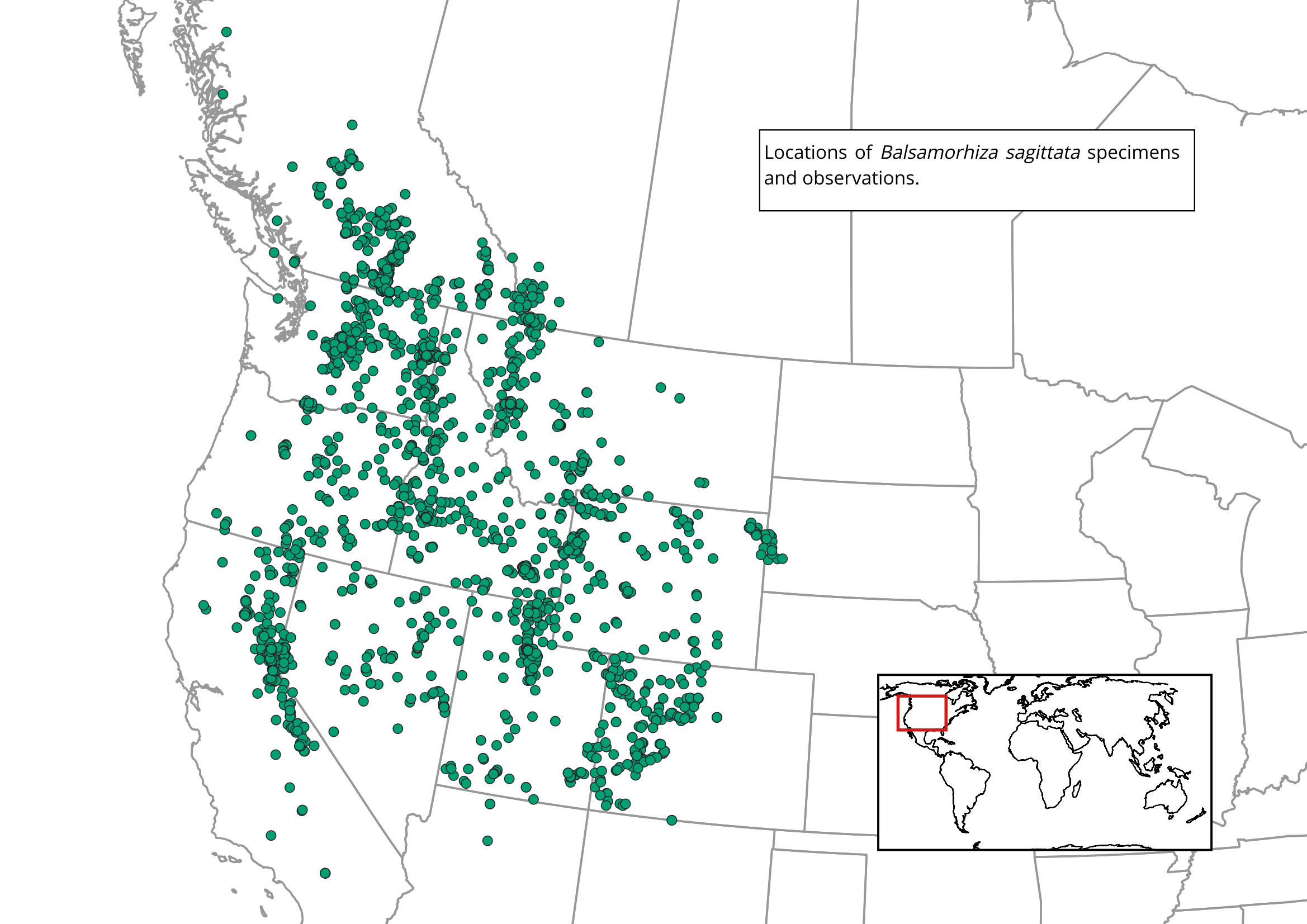
- Distribution in North America

Synonyms
- Balsamorhiza helianthoides (Nutt.) Nutt.; Buphthalmum sagittatum Pursh; Espeletia helianthoides Nutt.; Espeletia sagittata (Pursh) Nutt.

= Balsamorhiza sagittata =

Species of flowering plant

Balsamorhiza sagittata is a North American species of flowering plant in the tribe Heliantheae of the family Asteraceae known by the common name arrowleaf balsamroot. Also sometimes called Oregon sunflower or Okanagan Sunflower, it is widespread across western Canada and much of the western United States.

== Description ==
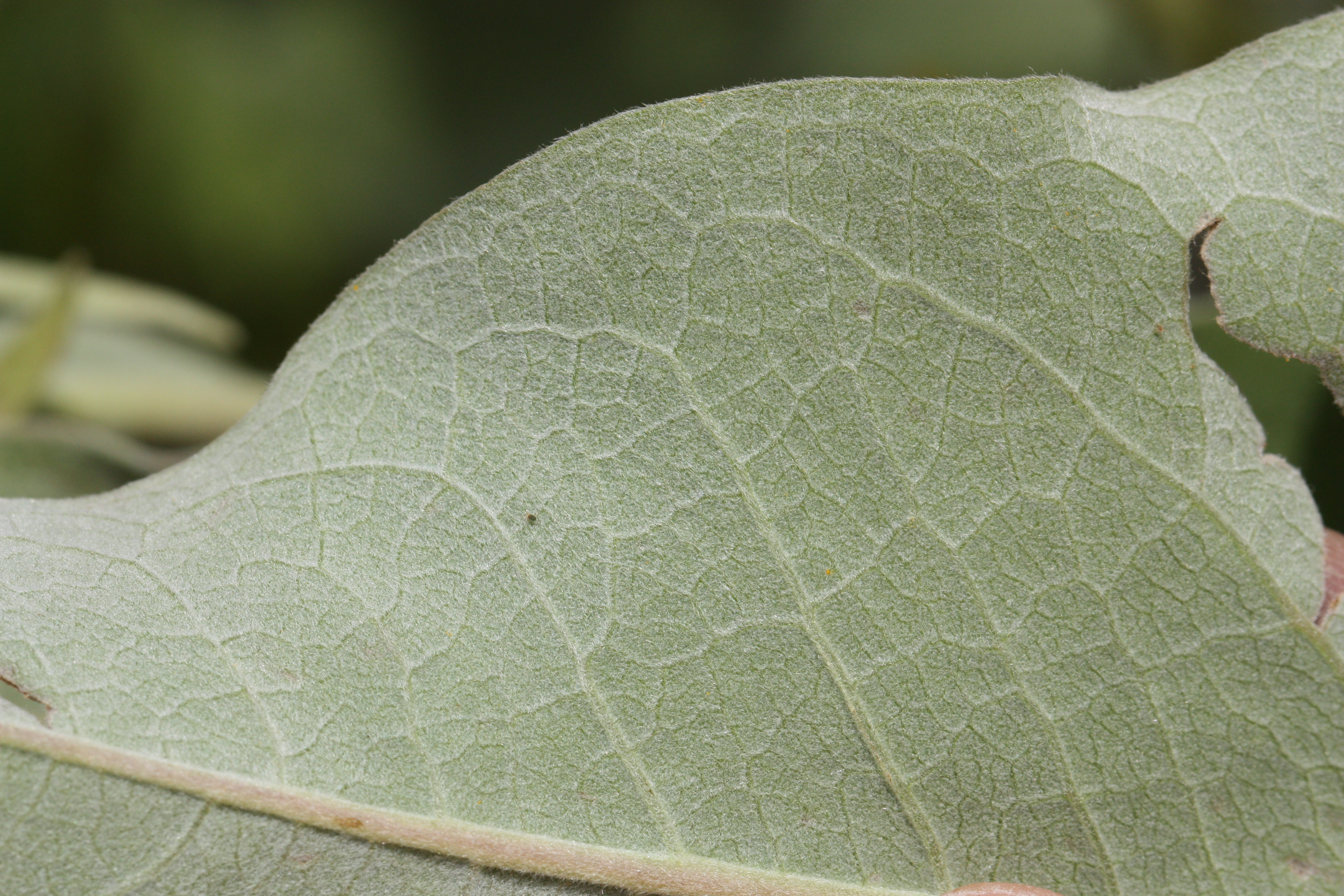
The leaves are entire and covered with fine to rough hairs, especially on the undersides.

This is a taprooted perennial herb growing a hairy, glandular stem 20 to 60 centimetres (7 3/4 to 23 1/2 inches) tall, with the plant's total height up to 80 cm (31 in). The branching, barky root may extend over 2 metres (6 1/2 feet) deep into the soil. The silvery-gray basal leaves are generally triangular in shape and large, approaching 50 cm (20 in) in maximum length. Leaves higher up the stem are linear to narrowly oval in shape and smaller. The leaves have untoothed edges and are coated in fine to rough hairs, especially on the undersides.

The inflorescence bears one or more flower head, sometimes multiple on the same stem, blooming from May to July. Each head has a center of yellowish tubular disc florets and a fringe of 8–25 bright yellow ray florets, each up to 4 cm (1 1/2 in) long. The fruit is a hairless achene approximately 8 millimetres (3/8 in) long.

B. deltoidea is similar, but is greener, less hairy, and does not retain its ray flowers for long.

== Distribution and habitat ==
The plant's native range extends from British Columbia and Alberta in the north, southward as far as northern Arizona and the Mojave Desert of California, and as far east as the Black Hills of South Dakota. It grows in many types of habitats such as forests, grasslands, and deserts. It is drought tolerant.

== Ecology ==
The species hybridizes with Balsamorhiza hookeri.

Grazing animals find the plant palatable, especially the flowers and developing seed heads. Elk and deer browse the leaves. Sheep also find them very palatable.

== Uses ==
Coming into season in late spring, all of the plant can be eaten—particularly the leaves (raw or cooked), roots (cooked), and the seeds, raw or pounded into flour. It can be bitter and pine-like in taste. The leaves are best collected when young and can carry a citrus flavor.

Many Native American groups, including the Nez Perce, Kootenai, Cheyenne, and Salish, utilized the plant as a food and medicine. The seeds were particularly valuable as food or used for oil. In 1806, William Clark collected a specimen near the White Salmon River, and both he and Frederick Pursh noted that the stem was eaten raw by the American natives.

Nlaka'pamux traditional knowledge holds that when arrowleaf balsamroot starts blooming, bitterroot is ready to be dug up and harvested.

Because of its beauty and its slow-growing taproot, they are often used in slope restoration projects.

== Culture ==
A specimen was collected by explorer and botanist Meriwether Lewis near Lewis and Clark Pass in 1806.

Under the name Okanagan Sunflower, it is the official flower emblem of the city of Kelowna, British Columbia, Canada.

== Gallery ==
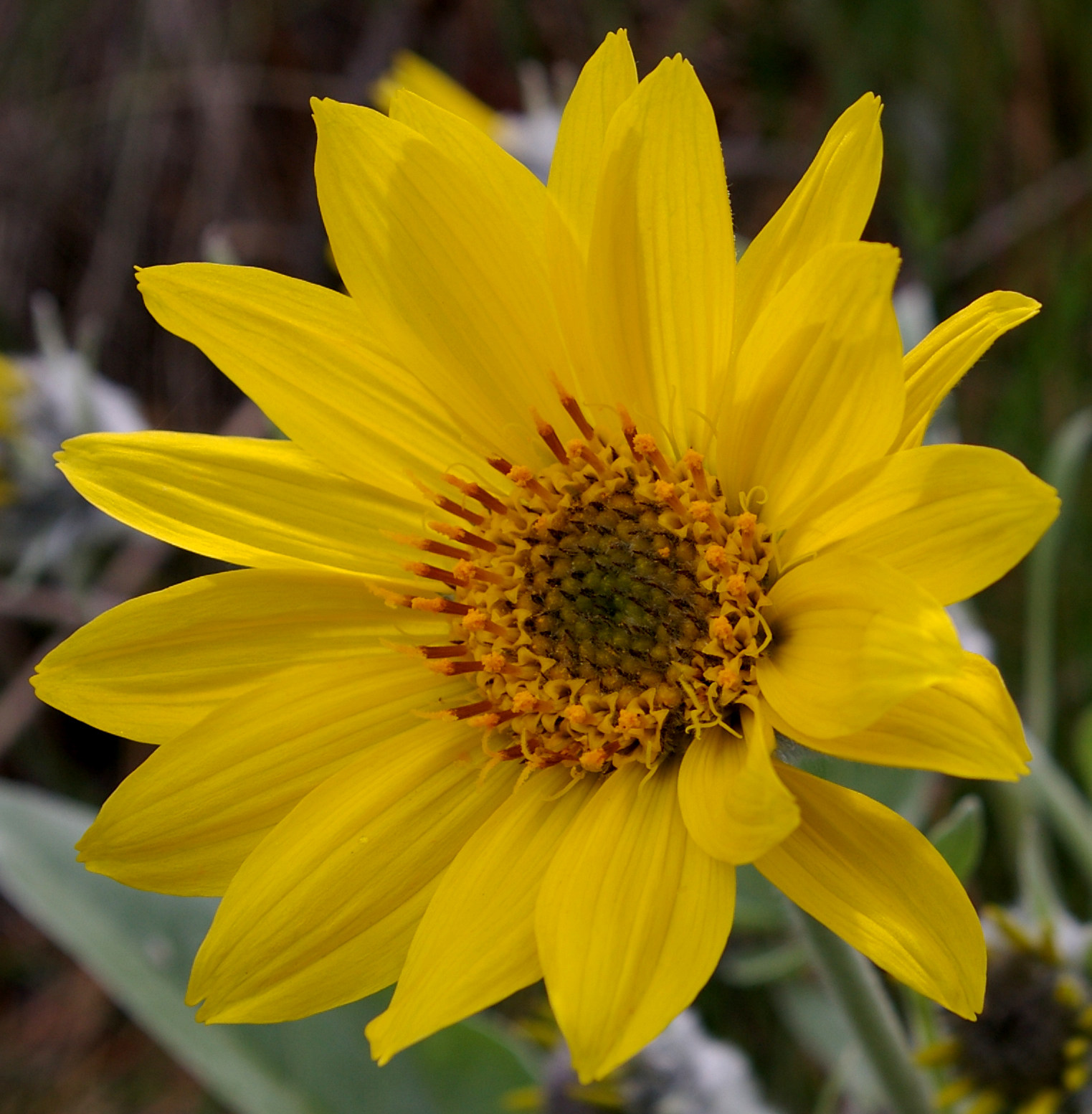
Balsamorhiza sagittata flower head

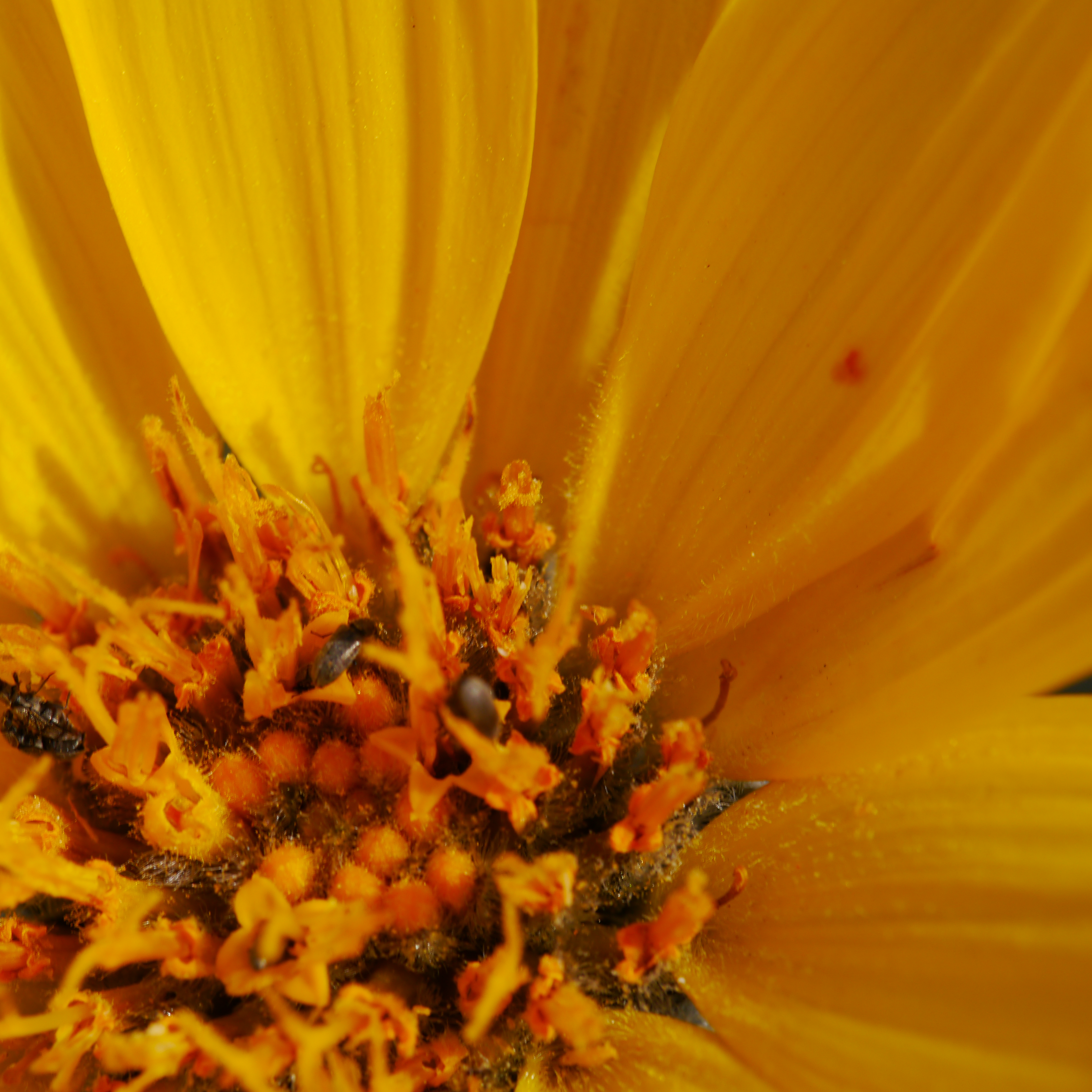
Balsamorhiza sagittata insect predation

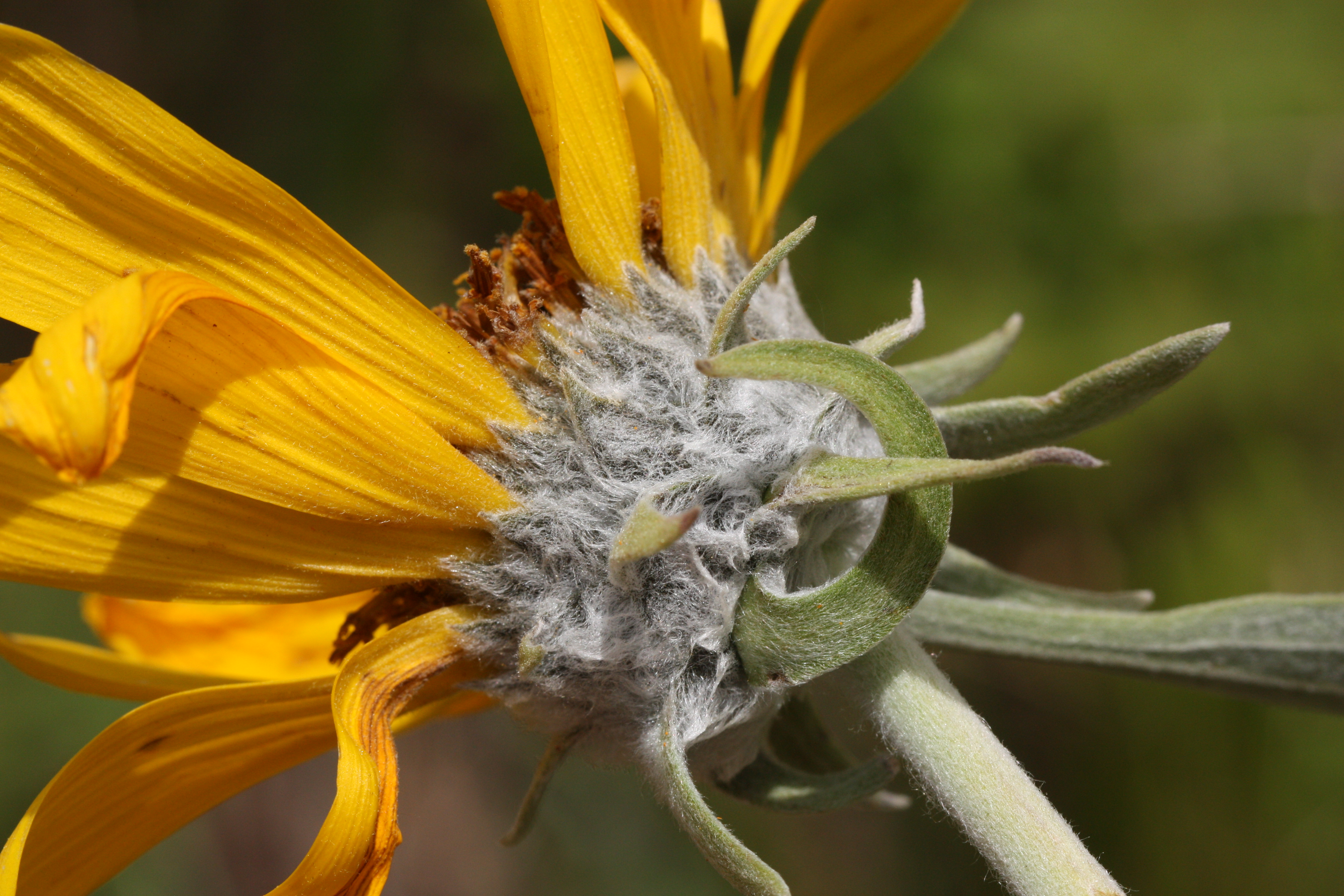
Balsamorhiza sagittata involucre.

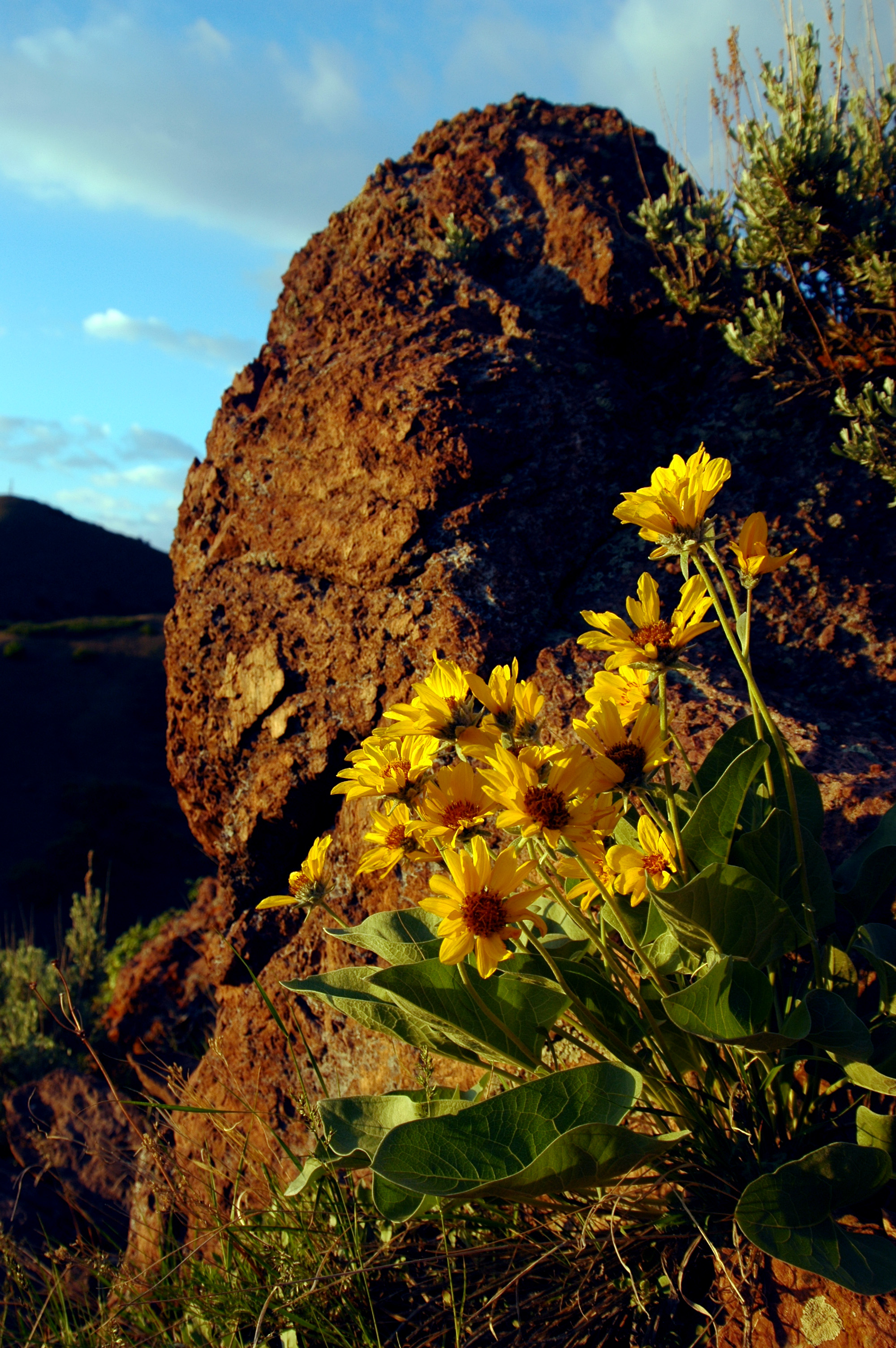
Balsamorhiza sagittata

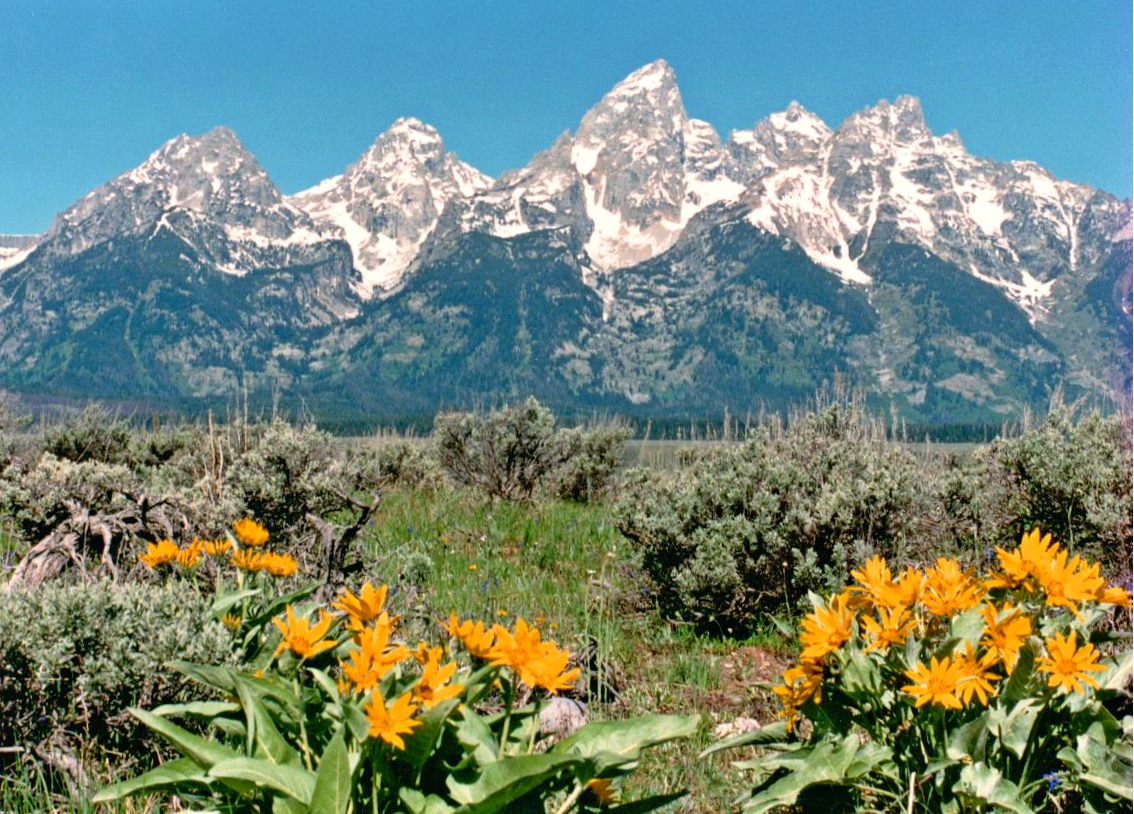
Balsamorhiza sagittata in Grand Teton National Park, Wyoming, US

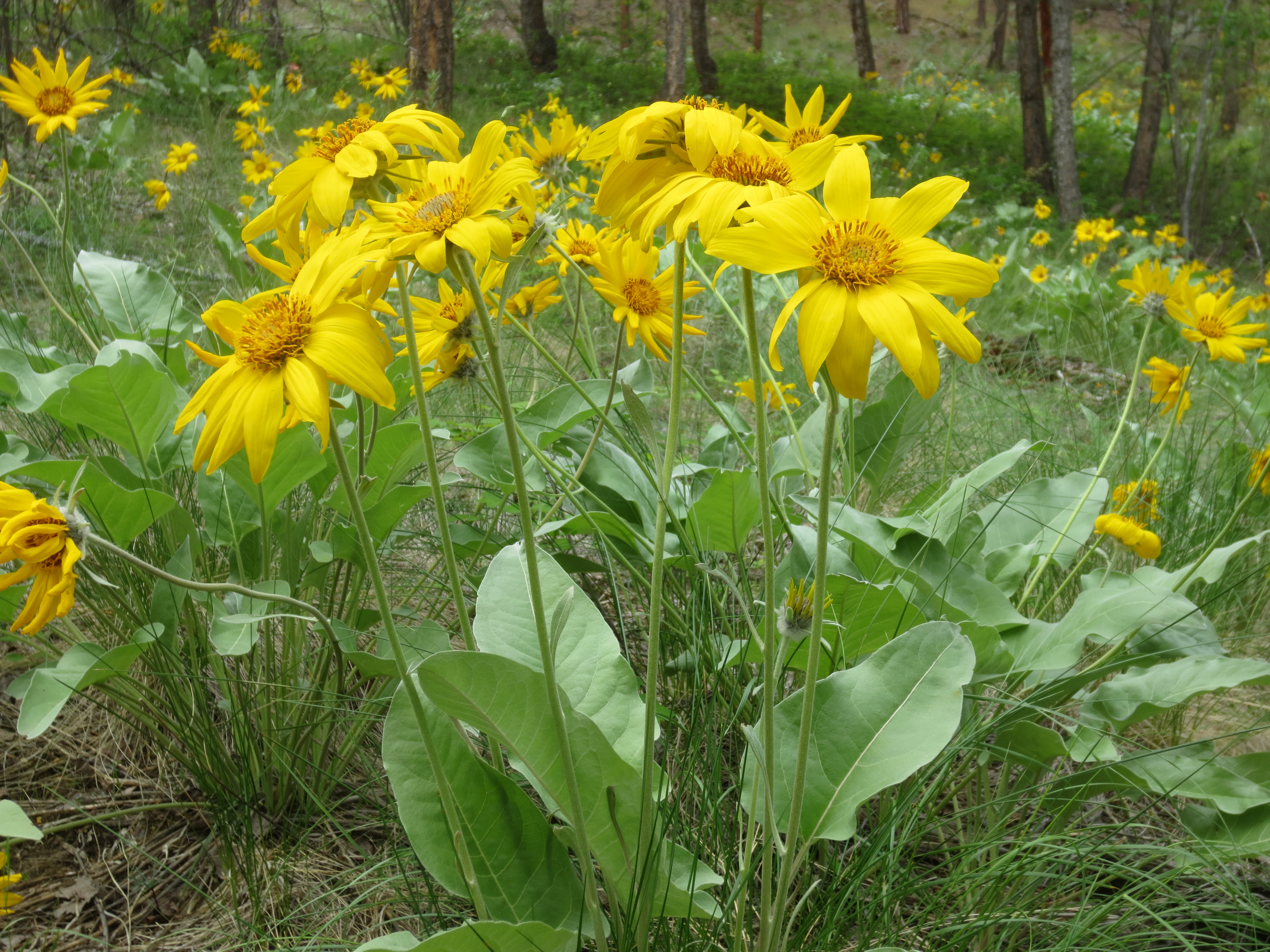
Balsamorhiza sagittata in East Knox Mountain Park, British Columbia, Canada.

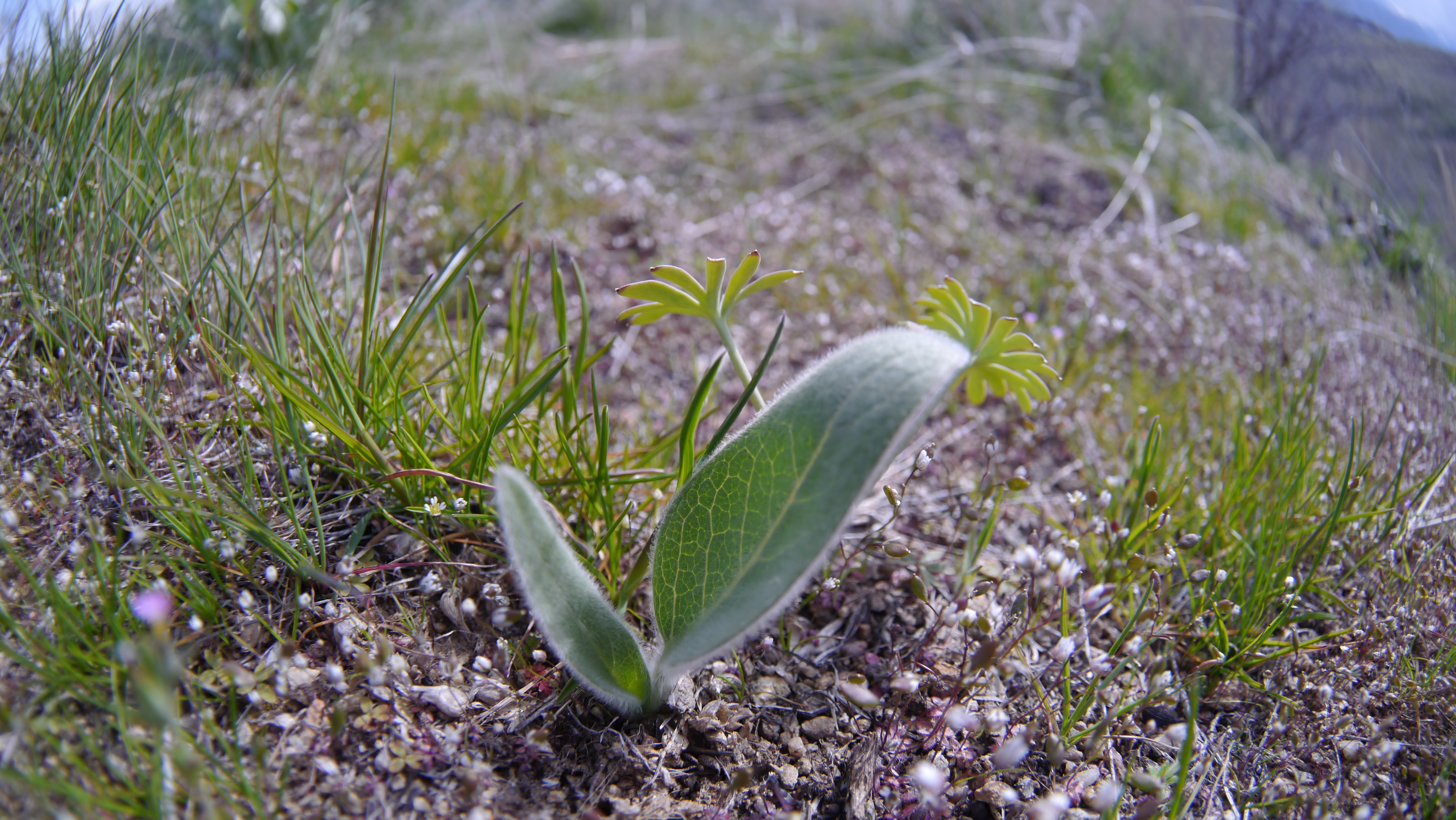
Balsamorhiza sagittata seedling

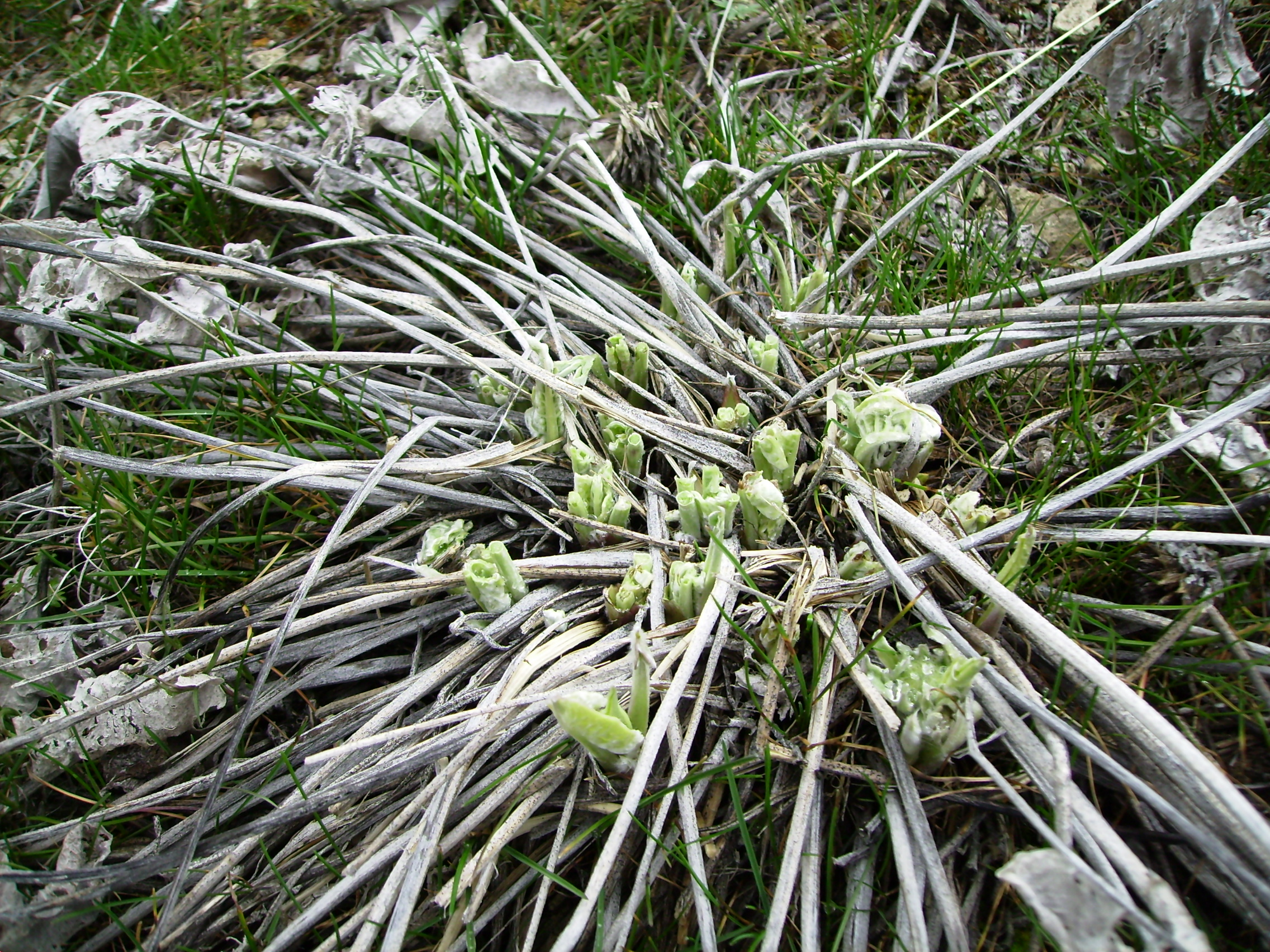
Balsamorhiza sagittata leaves sprouting from mature plant in early spring

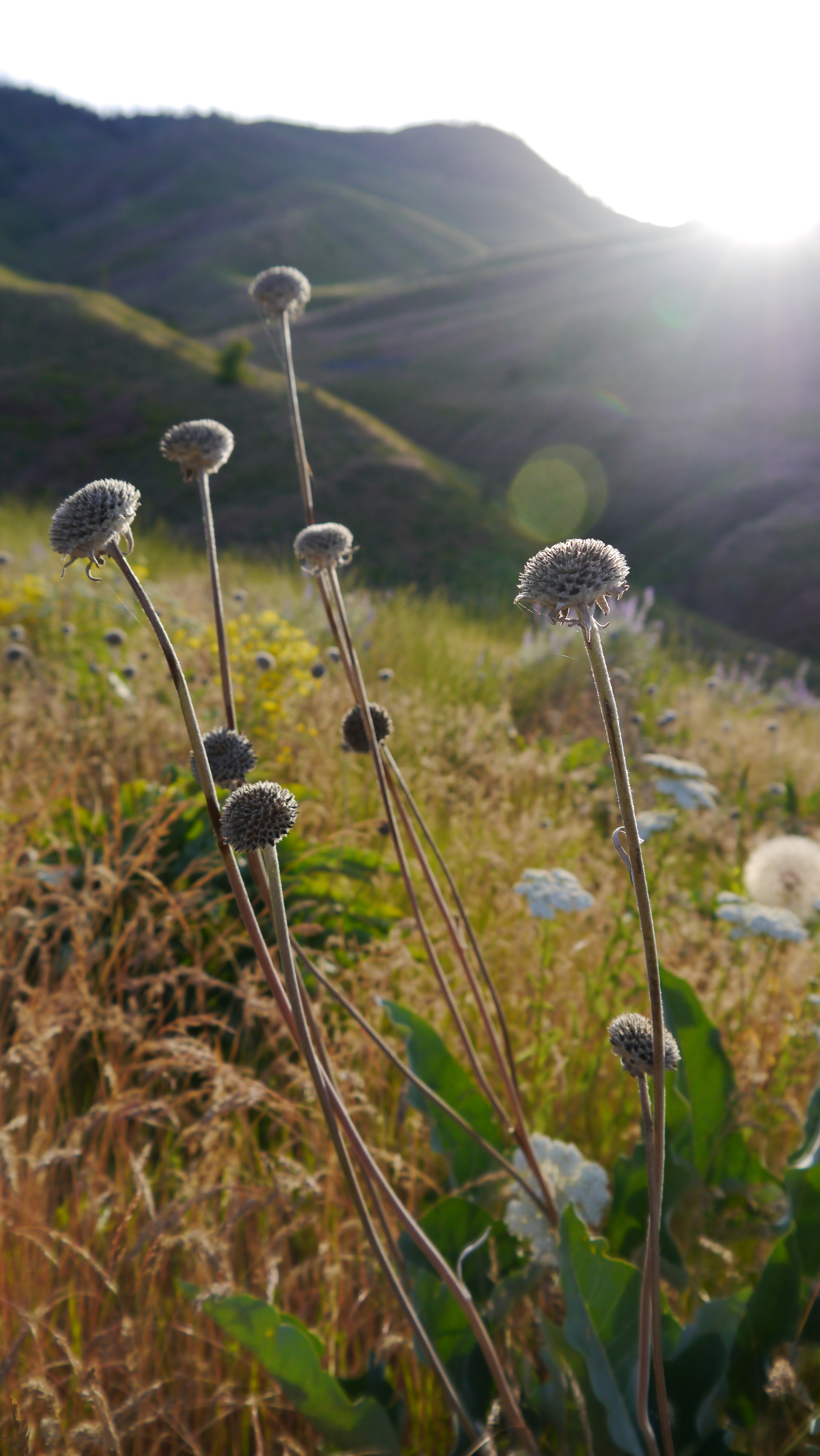
Balsamorhiza sagittata mature seed heads in June

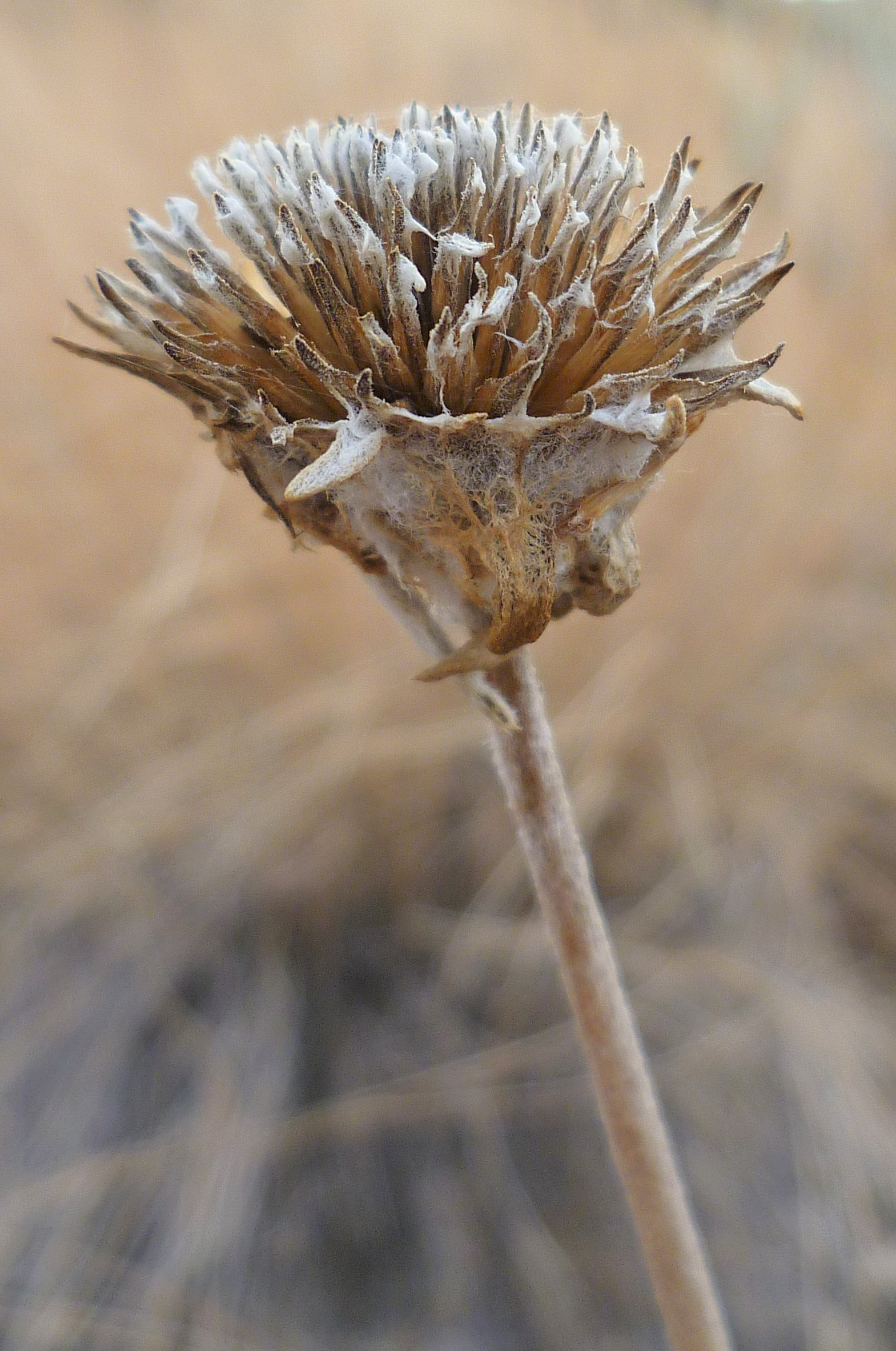
Balsamorhiza sagittata mature seed head

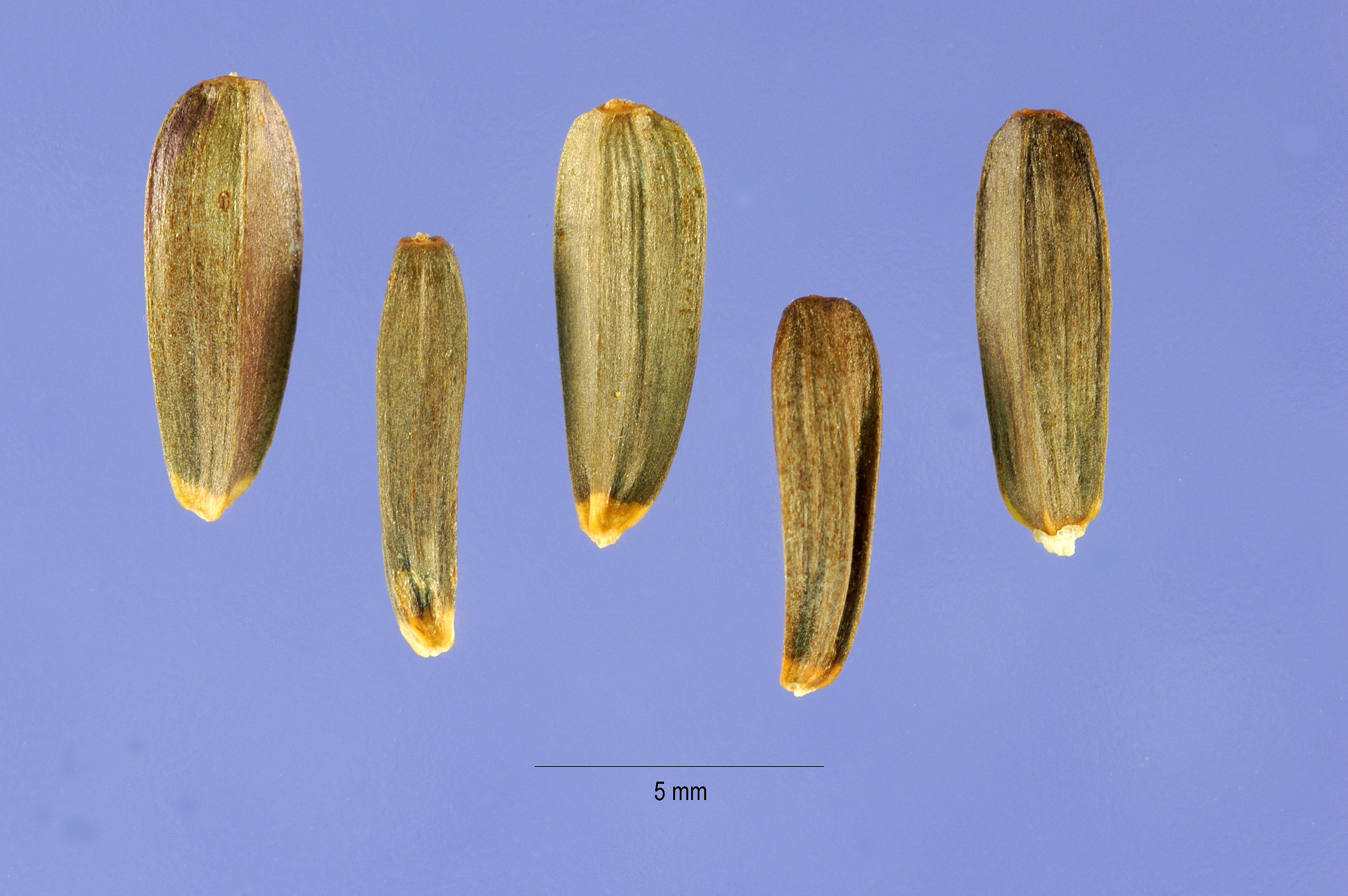
Balsamorhiza sagittata seeds

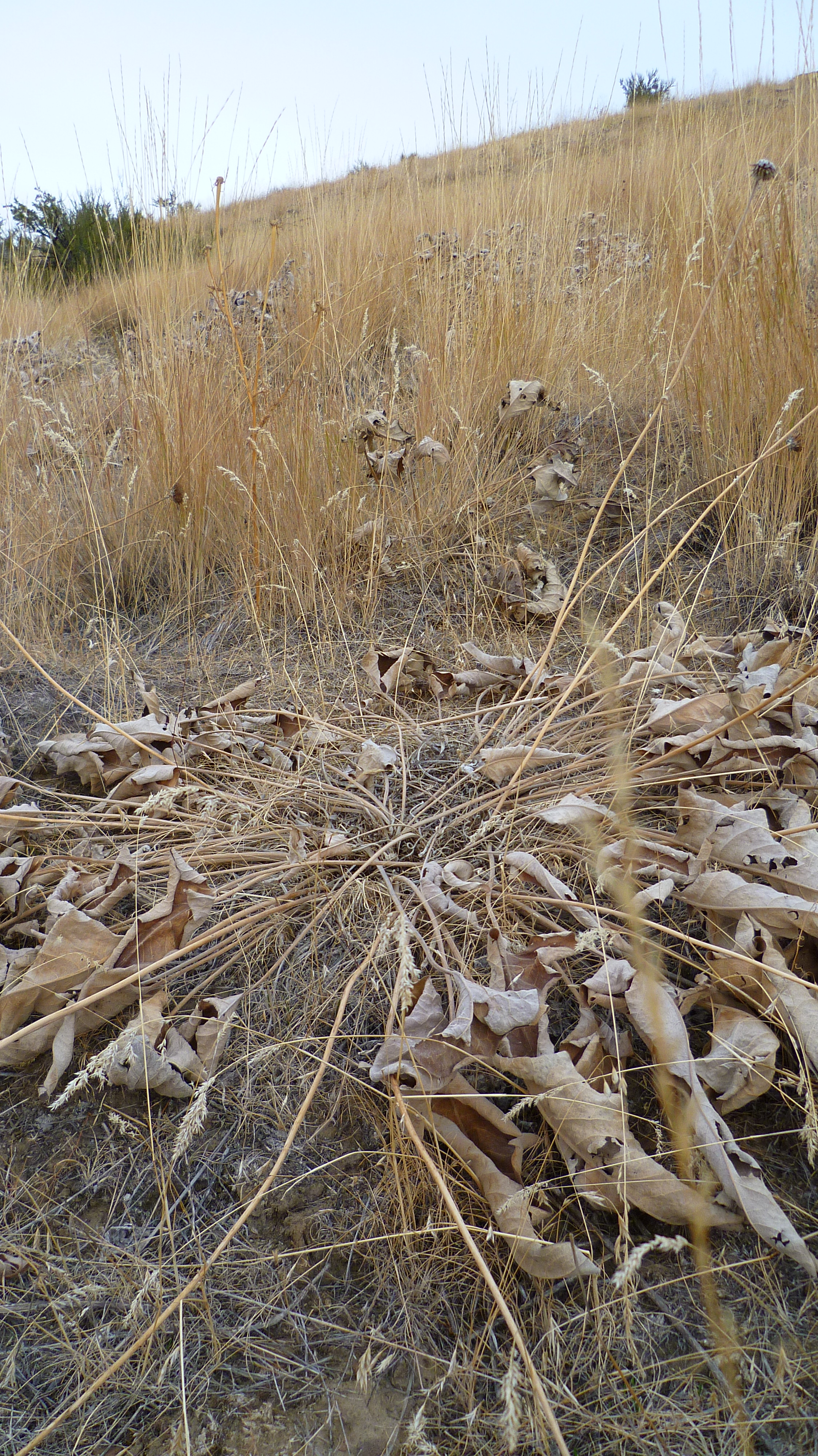
Balsamorhiza sagittata dry plants in fall that are dormant

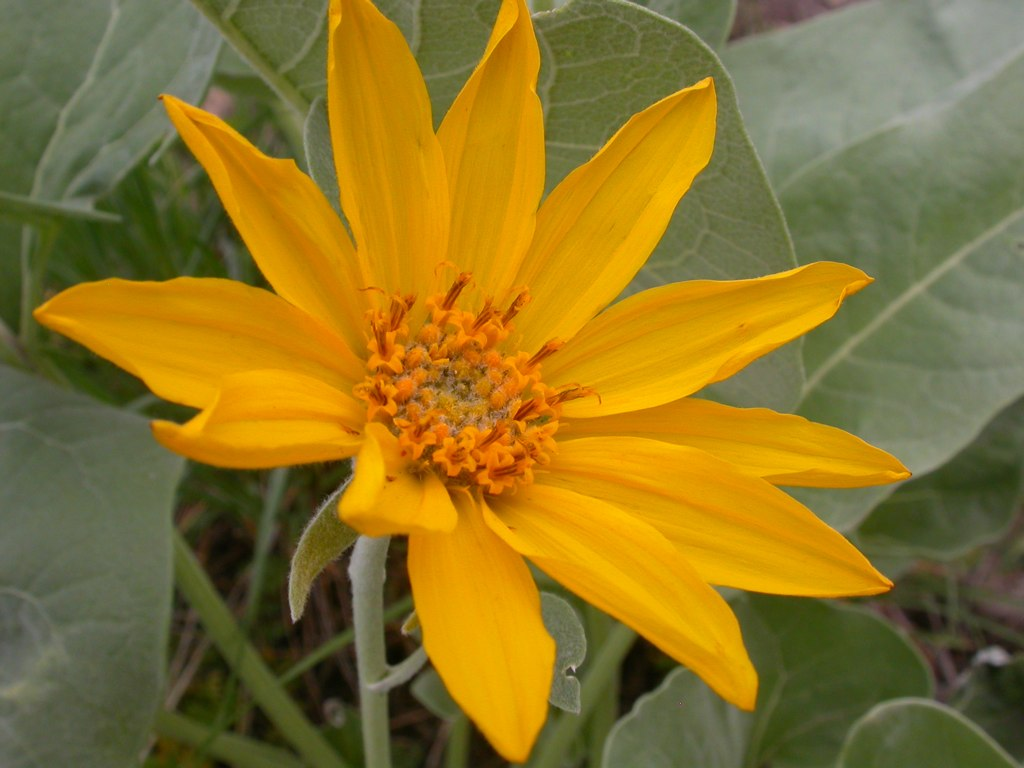
Bright orange-yellow petals are a distinguishing characteristic of Balsamorhiza sagittata
