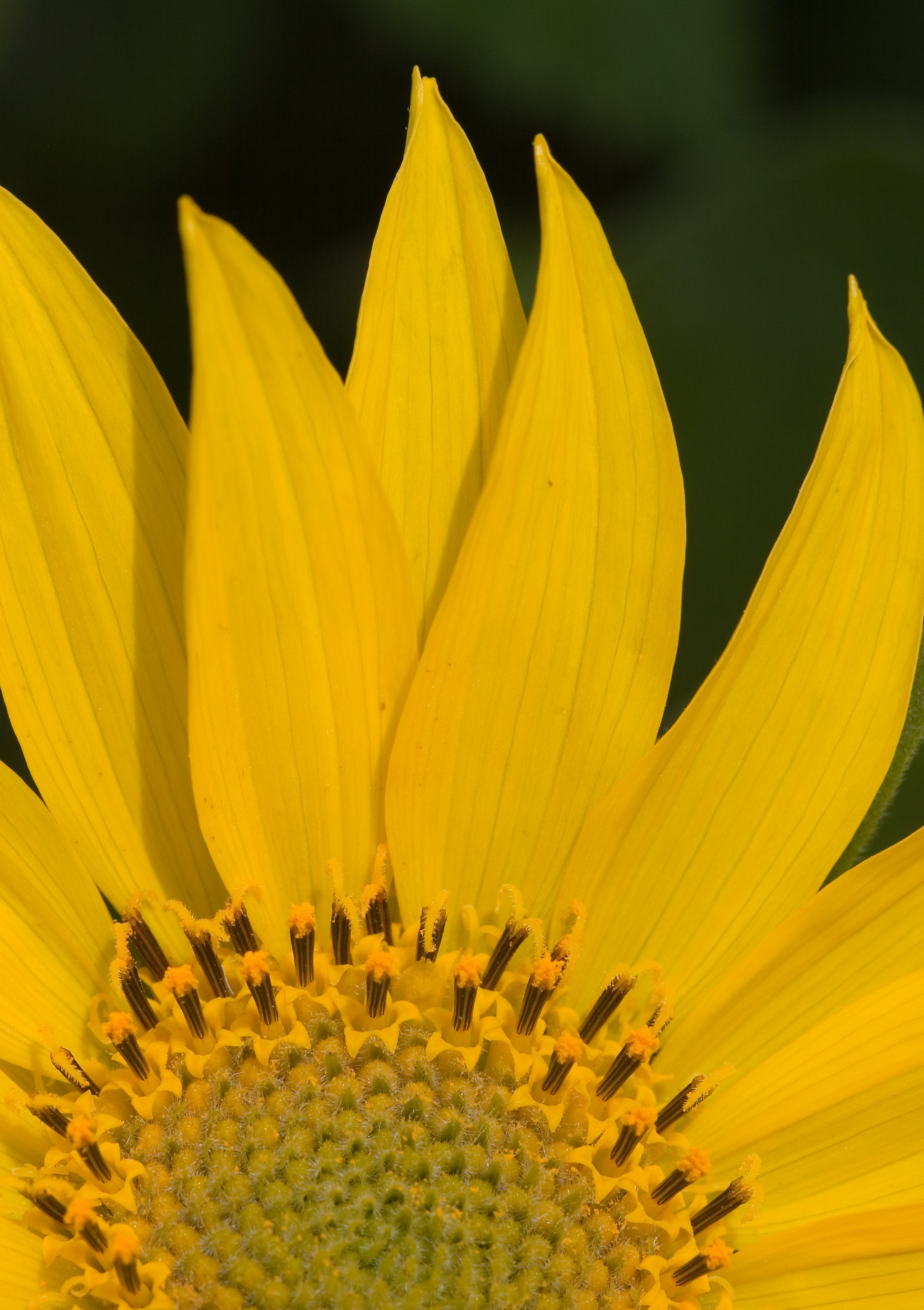
- disc florets and ray florets

Conservation status
- Secure (NatureServe)

Scientific classification
- Kingdom: Plantae
- Clade: Tracheophytes
- Clade: Angiosperms
- Clade: Eudicots
- Clade: Asterids
- Order: Asterales
- Family: Asteraceae
- Genus: Balsamorhiza
- Species: B. deltoidea

Binomial name
- Balsamorhiza deltoidea Nutt.

Synonyms
- Balsamorhiza glabrescens Benth.

= Balsamorhiza deltoidea =

Species of flowering plant

Balsamorhiza deltoidea is a species of flowering plant in the sunflower tribe of the plant family Asteraceae known by the common name deltoid balsamroot. It is native to western North America from British Columbia to California, where it grows in many types of generally mountainous habitats.

== Description ==
Balsamorhiza deltoidea is a taprooted perennial herb growing upright to a maximum height near 90 centimeters (35 inches). The stems are hairy and glandular. The large leaves are up to 25 centimeters (9.8 inches) long and 20 cm (7.9 in) wide, and are roughly triangular in shape, hairy and glandular, and generally toothed along the edges.

The inflorescence bears usually one or sometimes a few large flower heads, each lined with hairy, pointed phyllaries up to 4 centimeters (1.6 inches) long. The head has a center of yellowish disc florets and a fringe of pointed yellow ray florets each up to 4 or 5 centimeters (1.6 or 2.0 inches) long. The fruit is an achene 7 to 8 millimeters (0.28 to 0.31 inches) in length.

== Uses ==
Deltoid balsamroot has been used as a food and medicinal plant by Native Americans. The seeds were eaten raw or cooked, and sometimes ground up and made into breads or cakes. The roots were also eaten, either raw or cooked, and they made a coffee substitute when roasted. Young shoots were also eaten as a fresh green. The roots were also used to treat colds.
