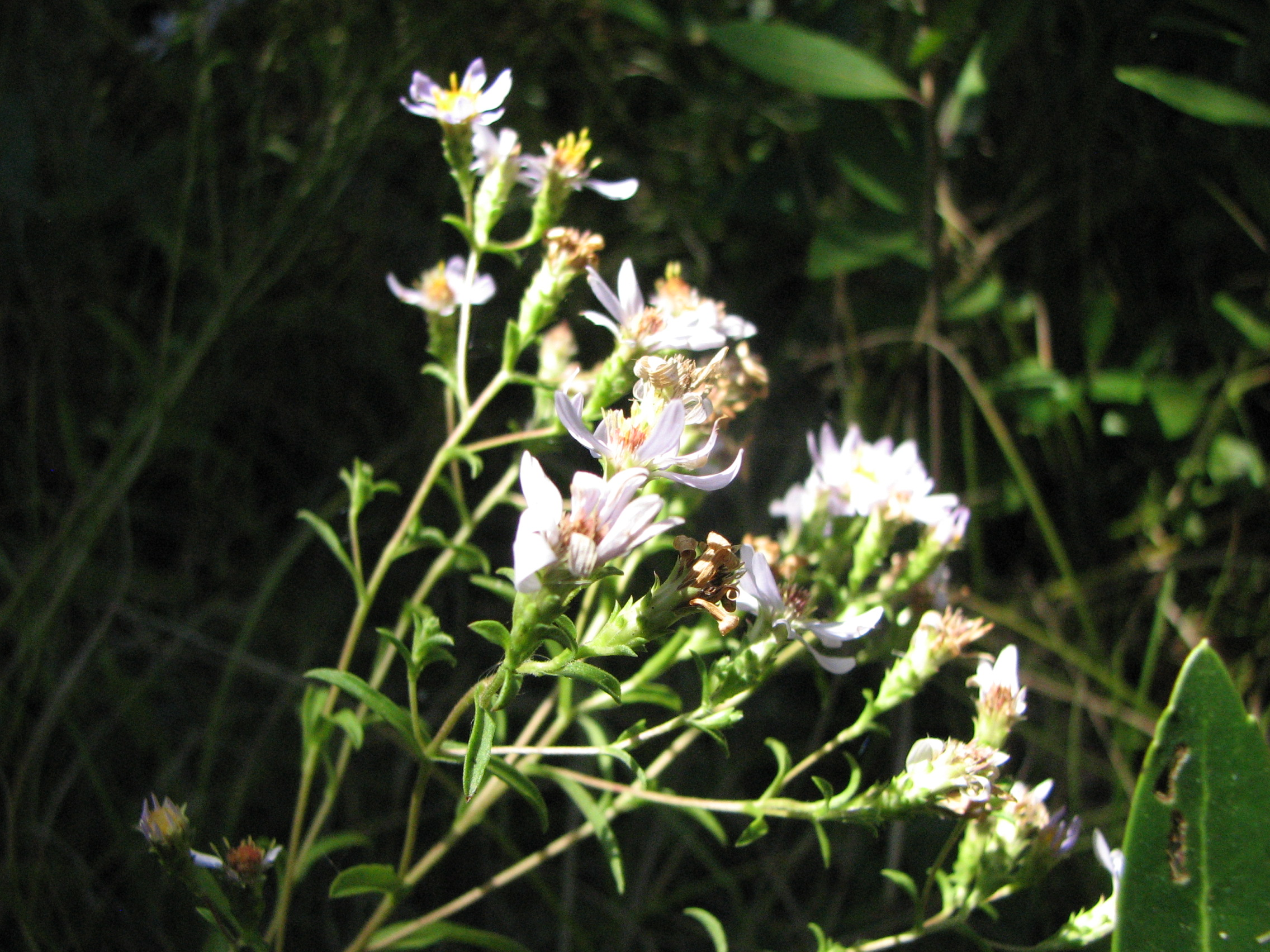
- Eurybia compacta in the New Jersey Pine Barrens.

Conservation status
- Apparently Secure (NatureServe)

Scientific classification
- Kingdom: Plantae
- Clade: Tracheophytes
- Clade: Angiosperms
- Clade: Eudicots
- Clade: Asterids
- Order: Asterales
- Family: Asteraceae
- Genus: Eurybia
- Species: E. compacta

Binomial name
- Eurybia compacta G.L.Nesom

Synonyms
- Aster gracilis Nutt. not Eurybia gracilis Benth.; Aster surculosus var. gracilis (Nutt.) A. Gray

= Eurybia compacta =

Slender aster

Species of flowering plant

Eurybia compacta, commonly known as the slender aster, is an herbaceous perennial native to the eastern United States from New Jersey to Georgia. It is commonly found along the coastal plain in dry sandy soils, especially in pinelands. While it is not considered to be in high danger of extinction, it is of conservation concern and has most likely been extirpated from much of its original range. The slender aster was for a long time considered to be a variety of E. surculosa, but Guy Nesom's recent research within the genus has shown that it is distinct enough to be treated as a species. It has also been shown to be related to E. avita and E. paludosa.

Eurybia compacta is a perennial up to 70 cm (28 inches) tall, the stem becoming woody with age. The flowers emerge from midsummer to the beginning of fall, with as many as 55 flower heads in a flat-topped array. Each head contains 5-14 pale blue, light violet or reddish purple ray florets surrounding 10-20 pale yellow disc florets.

== Taxonomy ==
The first name applied to the slender aster was Aster gracilis, which was given by Thomas Nuttall in 1818. Asa Gray later decided that it was better treated as a variety of Aster surculosus. When Guy Nesom decided to transfer many of the North American plants within the genus Aster to Eurybia, the plant needed to receive a new name as a Eurybia gracilis had already been used for an Australian species named by George Bentham in 1837, and now called Camptacra gracilis.
