= Arctic aster =

The common name arctic aster may refer to two different plants of the genus Eurybia:

- Eurybia merita, the subalpine aster
- Eurybia sibirica, the Siberian aster
