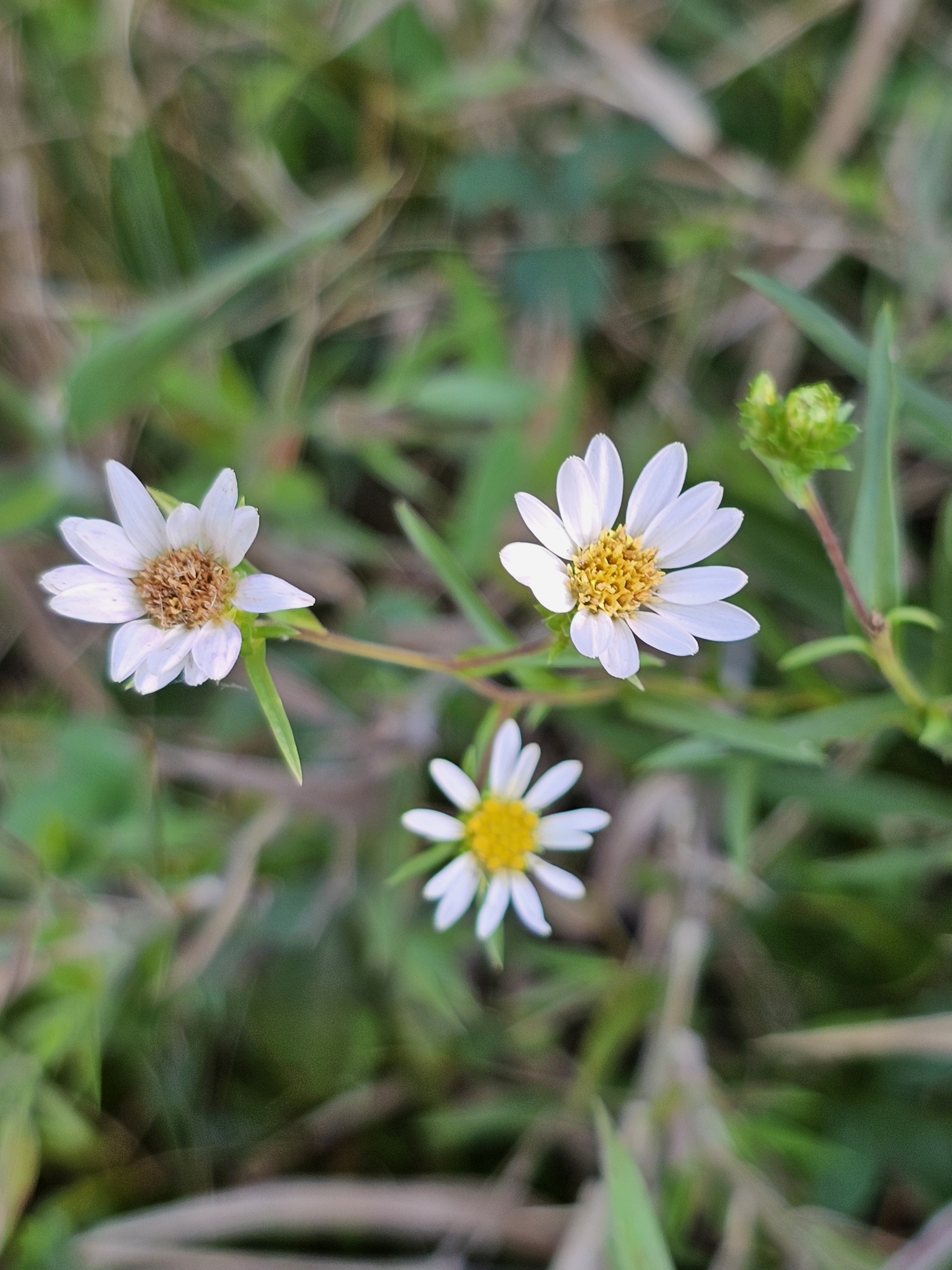

Conservation status
- Vulnerable (NatureServe)

Scientific classification
- Kingdom: Plantae
- Clade: Tracheophytes
- Clade: Angiosperms
- Clade: Eudicots
- Clade: Asterids
- Order: Asterales
- Family: Asteraceae
- Genus: Eurybia
- Species: E. avita

Binomial name
- Eurybia avita (Alexander) G.L.Nesom

Synonyms
- Aster avitus Alexander

= Eurybia avita =

Alexander's rock aster

Species of flowering plant

Eurybia avita, commonly called Alexander's rock aster, is a rare North American plant species, a herbaceous perennial in the family Asteraceae that was formerly considered part of the genus Aster. It is native to the southeastern United States. It is of conservation concern as it is found in less than 50 sites, typically only in sandy soils near granite flatrocks, and it is most likely already extirpated in North Carolina. Its habitat is threatened by development and the recreational use of the area where it grows. It is very similar to both E. surculosa and E. paludosa and more research needs to be done to determine the exact relationship between the three species.

Eurybia avita is a perennial herb sometimes as much as 80 cm (32 inches) tall, having 1-5 stems and reproducing by means of underground rhizomes. The flowers emerge in the late summer to early fall, the plant producing 3-15 or more flower heads in a flat-topped array. Each head contains 8–20 pale blue, purple, or violet ray florets and 15–45 yellow disc florets.

== Distribution and habitat ==
Eurybia avita is present only in the U.S. states of Georgia, South Carolina and North Carolina, though it is probably extirpated from North Carolina. In South Carolina it is only known from one site in Pickens County, while in Georgia it can be found in 40 to 45 locations. In North Carolina there are currently no known populations. The type location was Stone Mountain, but that population no longer exists. It is typically found between 100 and 500 metre (350–2800 feet) (elevations growing in shallow and sandy soils around the edges of granite flatrock outcroppings.
