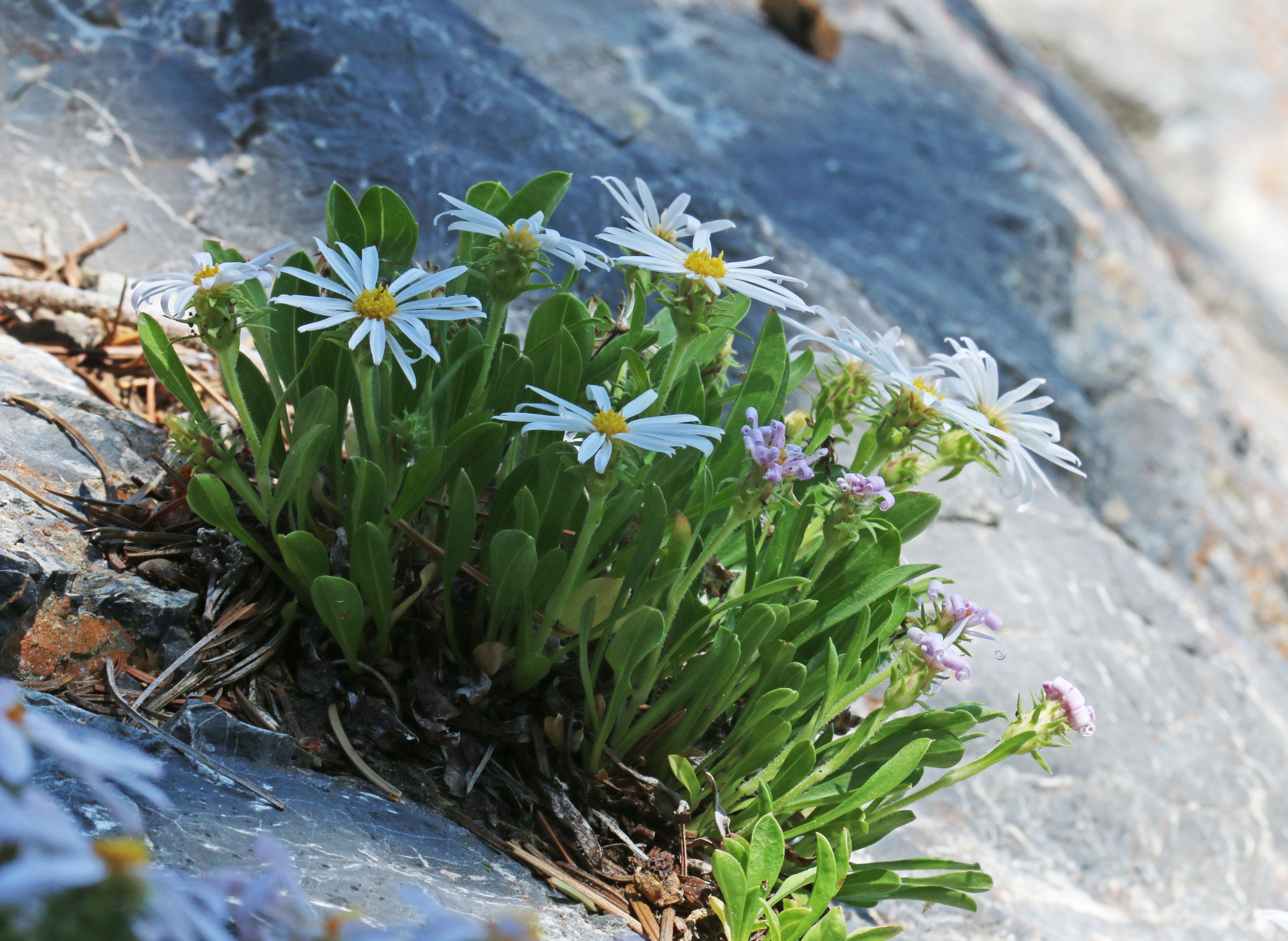
- Herrickia kingii

Scientific classification
- Kingdom: Plantae
- Clade: Tracheophytes
- Clade: Angiosperms
- Clade: Eudicots
- Clade: Asterids
- Order: Asterales
- Family: Asteraceae
- Subfamily: Asteroideae
- Tribe: Astereae
- Subtribe: Machaerantherinae
- Genus: Herrickia; Woot. & Standl. 1913

Synonyms
- Eurybia sect. Herrickia (Wooton & Standl.) G.L.Nesom

= Herrickia =

Genus of flowering plants

Herrickia is a former North American genus of flowering plants in the family Asteraceae, native to the western United States. In 2004 it was proposed to revive the genus with species that were included in Aster before molecular studies triggered the splitting of that genus into several distinct genera. However, the status of this genus is disputed with Plants of the World Online (POWO) synonymizing it with Eurybia as of 2023.

Species

- Herrickia glauca - Arizona, New Mexico, Colorado, Utah, Wyoming, Montana, Idaho
- Herrickia horrida - New Mexico, Colorado
- Herrickia kingii - Utah
- Herrickia wasatchensis - Utah
