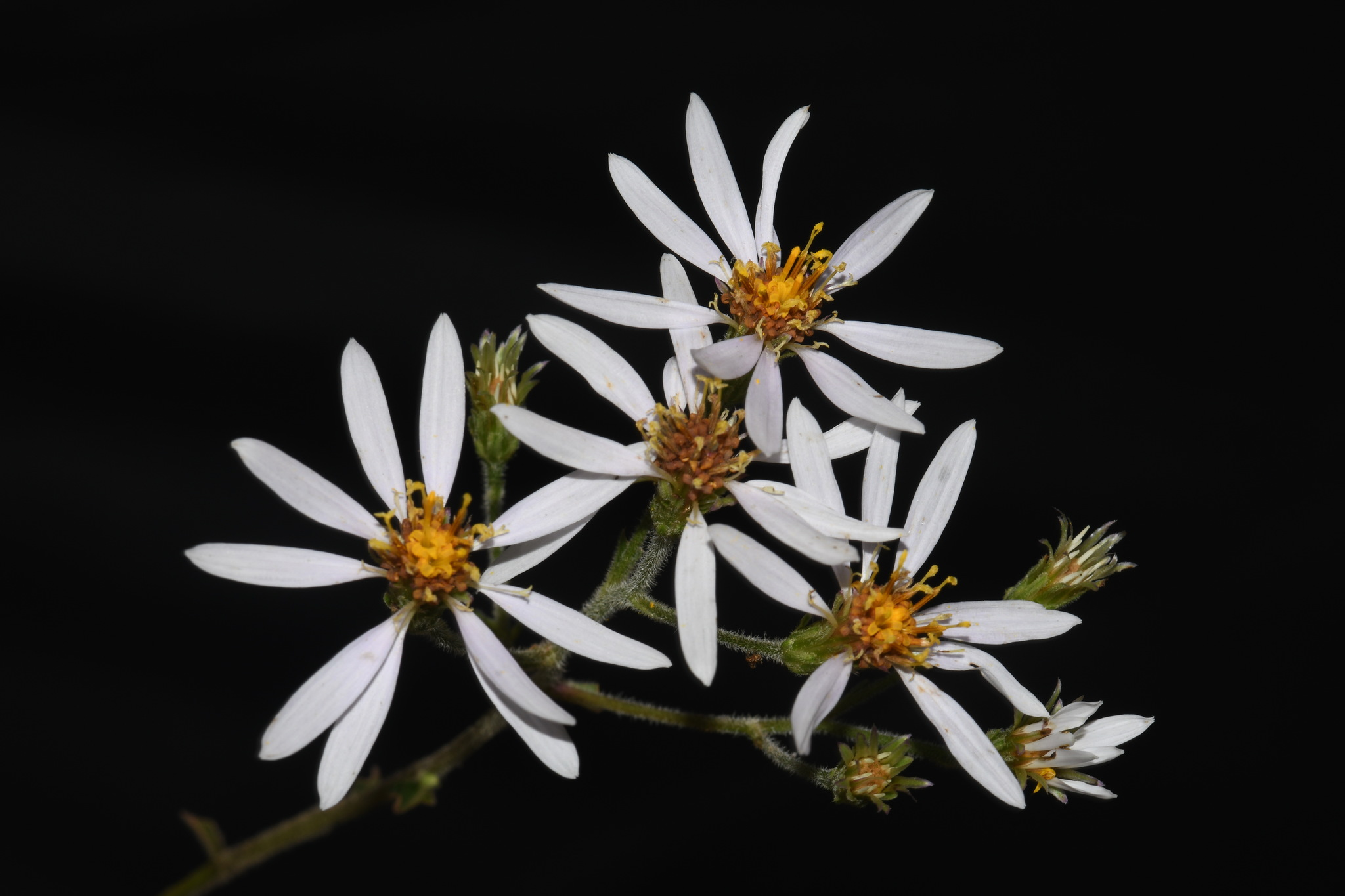

Conservation status
- Vulnerable (NatureServe)

Scientific classification
- Kingdom: Plantae
- Clade: Tracheophytes
- Clade: Angiosperms
- Clade: Eudicots
- Clade: Asterids
- Order: Asterales
- Family: Asteraceae
- Genus: Eurybia
- Species: E. jonesiae

Binomial name
- Eurybia jonesiae (Lamboy) G.L.Nesom

Synonyms
- Aster jonesiae Lamboy

= Eurybia jonesiae =

Jones's aster

Species of flowering plant

Eurybia jonesiae, commonly known as Jones's aster or Almut's wood aster, is a North American species of herbaceous perennial native to the Southeastern United States, primarily in the state of Georgia with a few populations in eastern Alabama. It is found mostly in the Piedmont Region in rich oak-hickory-pine forest. Within these rich woods, it has an affinity for moist soils with habitats that include ravines, rocky ridges, and wooded slopes in the vicinity of rivers and streams. Due to its restricted range it is considered threatened by the Nature Conservancy. It has often been misidentified as Eurybia spectabilis and was declared a separate species quite recently in 1988. The flowers emerge in the late summer and persist into the fall bearing cream-coloured ray florets that become purple and yellow disc florets.

== Distribution and habitat ==
Eurybia jonesiae grows only in the Piedmont Region south of the Appalachian Mountains. In this relatively small area, ranging from 100 to 400 metres (330–1330 feet) above sea level, it is found in rich oak-hickory-pine forests in moist soils. It is most common along the wooded slopes of rivers or streams, in moist ravines and on rocky ridges.
