= Eurybia wasatchensis =

Scientific classification
- Kingdom: Plantae
- Clade: Embryophytes
- Clade: Tracheophytes
- Clade: Spermatophytes
- Clade: Angiosperms
- Clade: Eudicots
- Clade: Asterids
- Order: Asterales
- Family: Asteraceae
- Genus: Eurybia
- Species: E. wasatchensis

Binomial name
- Eurybia wasatchensis (M.E.Jones) G.L.Nesom (1995)

Synonyms
- Aster glaucus var. wasatchensis M.E.Jones (1895); Aster wasatchensis (M.E.Jones) S.F.Blake; Eucephalus wasatchensis (M.E.Jones) Rydb.; Herrickia wasatchensis (M.E.Jones) Brouillet

Species of flowering plant

Eurybia wasatchensis is a North American species of flowering plants in the family Asteraceae, called the Wasatch aster. It has been found only in the state of Utah in the western United States.

Eurybia wasatchensis is a perennial herb up to 60 centimeters (2 feet) tall from a woody underground caudex. The plant produces flower heads in groups of 2-20 or more heads. Each head contains 13–21 white or pink ray florets surrounding 26–43 yellow disc florets.

== Taxonomy ==
Eurybia wasatchensis was first described and named as a subspecies, Aster glaucus var. wasatchensis, by Marcus E. Jones in 1895. Further study by the famous botanist Per Axel Rydberg lead to him publish a book where it was classified as a species with the name Eucephalus wasatchensis in 1917. Eight years later Sidney Fay Blake wrote in favor of its inclusion in the large Aster genus. In 2004 Luc Brouillet published a paper arguing for its being renamed Herrickia horrida along with a general reorganization of three other species into a restored genus, Herrickia. This is the classification used in the Flora of North America. However, as of 2023 Plants of the World Online (POWO) and the USDA Natural Resources Conservation Service PLANTS database (PLANTS) accept the 1995 description by Guy L. Nesom as Eurybia wasatchensis.

== Range ==
Though it has sometimes been reported from the state of Arizona, POWO and PLANTS both report it is endemic to the state of Utah.
