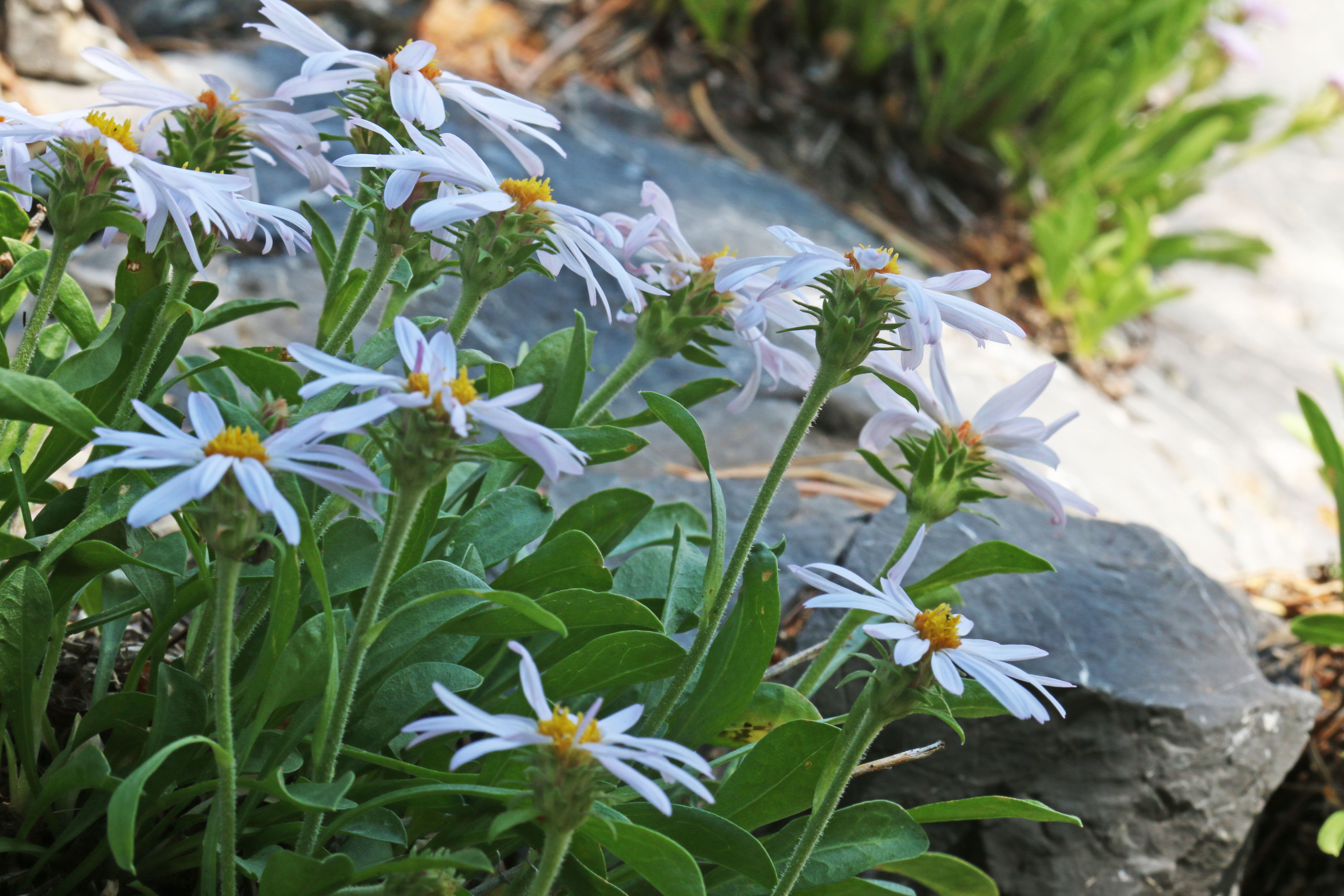

Conservation status
- Vulnerable (NatureServe)

Scientific classification
- Kingdom: Plantae
- Clade: Tracheophytes
- Clade: Angiosperms
- Clade: Eudicots
- Clade: Asterids
- Order: Asterales
- Family: Asteraceae
- Genus: Eurybia
- Species: E. kingii

Binomial name
- Eurybia kingii (D.C.Eaton) G.L.Nesom

Varieties
- Eurybia kingii var. barnebyana (S.L.Welsh & Goodrich) G.L.Nesom; Eurybia kingii var. kingii

Synonyms
- Aster kingii D.C.Eaton; Herrickia kingii (D.C.Eaton) Brouillet, Urbatsch & R.P.Roberts; Machaeranthera kingii (D.C.Eaton) Cronquist & D.D.Keck; Tonestus kingii (D.C.Eaton) G.L.Nesom

= Eurybia kingii =

Species of flowering plant

Eurybia kingii is a North American species of flowering plants in the family Asteraceae, called the King's serpentweed or King's aster. It has been found only in the State of Utah in the western United States.

Eurybia kingii is a small perennial herb rarely more than 12 centimeters (2.8 inches) tall from a woody underground caudex. The plant produces flower heads in groups of 1-5 heads. Each head contains 13-27 white or lavender ray florets surrounding 29–47 yellow disc florets.

== Taxonomy ==
Eurybia kingii was scientifically described and named in 1871 with the name Aster kingii by Daniel Cady Eaton. Due to the taxonomic complexity a later reclassification to Tonestus kingii was argued for by the Asteraceae specialist Guy L. Nesom in a 1991 paper. This found wide acceptance and continues to be name used for the species by the USDA Natural Resources Conservation Service PLANTS database (PLANTS) as of 2023. In 2004 Luc Brouillet published a paper arguing for its reclassification as Herrickia kingii along with a general reorganization of species into a restored genus, Herrickia. Returning to the subject in 2009, Guy L. Nesom proposed its inclusion in Eurybia. As of 2023 Plants of the World Online (POWO) and World Flora Online (WFO) both record it as Eurybia kingii.

=== Names ===
Eurybia kingii is known by two common names. The name "King’s aster" is a variation on the original botanical Latin name for the species. It is also known as "King's serpentweed" because of its previous placement in Tonestus which are commonly called serpentweeds.

== Range ==
Eurybia kingii is limited to just seven counties in Utah in the western half of the state, Box Elder, Cache, Webber, Salt Lake, Utah, Juab, and Millard. Eurybia kingii was evaluated by NatureServe as "Vulnerable" (G3) in 1999, with the same rank at the state level because it endemic to Utah.
