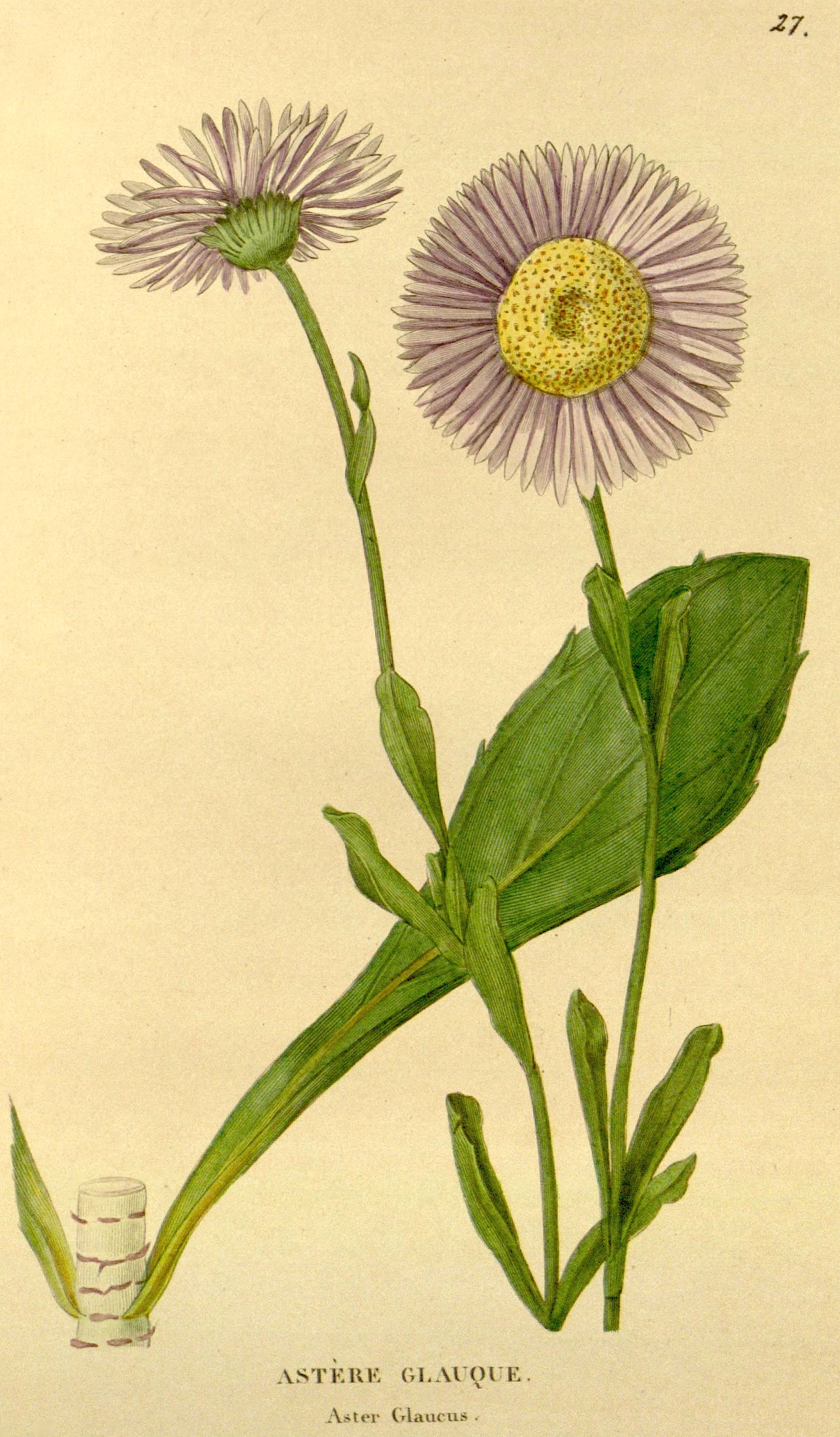
- Eurybia glauca as Aster hlaucus

Scientific classification
- Kingdom: Plantae
- Clade: Tracheophytes
- Clade: Angiosperms
- Clade: Eudicots
- Clade: Asterids
- Order: Asterales
- Family: Asteraceae
- Genus: Eurybia
- Species: E. glauca

Binomial name
- Eurybia glauca (Nutt.) G.L.Nesom

Varieties
- Eurybia glauca var. glauca Eurybia glauca var. pulchra; (S.F.Blake) Brouillet

Synonyms
- Aster glaucus (Nutt.) Torr. & A.Gray; Eucephalus glaucus Nutt.; Herrickia glauca (Nutt.) Brouillet

= Eurybia glauca =

Species of flowering plant

Eurybia glauca is a North American species of flowering plants in the family Asteraceae, called the gray aster. It is native to the western United States, primarily in Arizona, New Mexico, Utah, Colorado, and Wyoming, with a few populations in Idaho and Montana.

Eurybia glauca is a perennial herb or subshrub up to 70 centimeters (28 inches) tall from a woody rhizome. The plant produces flower heads numerous heads (sometimes over 100) in a flat-topped array. Each head contains 8-19 lavender ray florets surrounding 12-32 yellow or purplish disc florets.

== Taxonomy ==
Eurybia glauca was first described and given its first name as Eucephalus glaucus by the famous botanist Thomas Nuttall. He described it in a paper read to the society on 2 October 1840, but published in 1841 in Transactions of the American Philosophical Society. It was given a brief description and noted as growing, "Towards the sources of the Platte, and in the Rocky Mountains." In 2004 Luc Brouillet published a paper arguing for its reclassification as Herrickia glauca along with a general reorganization of species into a restored genus, Herrickia. However, as of 2023 Plants of the World Online (POWO) accepts the 1995 description by Guy L. Nesom as Eurybia glauca.

== Range ==
Eurybia glauca primarily grows west of the Rocky Mountains in Colorado, northern New Mexico, Arizona, and Utah. It also is found through much of Wyoming with a population known from one county in Idaho and other small populations in Montana.
