= Eurybia horrida =

Conservation status
- Vulnerable (NatureServe)

Scientific classification
- Kingdom: Plantae
- Clade: Tracheophytes
- Clade: Angiosperms
- Clade: Eudicots
- Clade: Asterids
- Order: Asterales
- Family: Asteraceae
- Genus: Eurybia
- Species: E. horrida

Binomial name
- Eurybia horrida (Woot. & Standl.) G.L.Nesom

Synonyms
- Aster horridus (Wooton & Standl.) S.F.Blake; Herrickia horrida Wooton & Standl.

Species of flowering plant

Eurybia horrida is a species of flowering plant in the family Asteraceae known by the common names spiny aster and horrid herrickia. It is native to Colorado and New Mexico in the United States, where it occurs only in the Canadian River basin. It most often included in genus Eurybia.

Eurybia horrida is a clumpy perennial herb or subshrub growing 30 to 60 centimeters tall from a woody rhizome. There are one to many stems which are coated in resin glands. The leaves are oval or oblong in shape with bases that clasp the stem. They are up to 4.5 centimeters in length. They are tough, glandular, coated in rough hairs, and lined with spiny teeth on the edges. The inflorescence may be a single flower head or an array of several heads. Each head is lined with glandular green or purplish phyllaries. It contains purple ray florets which may be up to 2.2 centimeters long, and yellow or purplish disc florets. Blooming occurs in summer, or as late as October. The fruit is an achene with a pappus of bristles.

Eurybia horrida grows on dry mountain slopes and canyons, often in oak woodlands, pinyon-juniper woodlands and grasslands. Most of its habitat is rugged and inaccessible, which helps protect it from human threats.

== Taxonomy ==
Eurybia horrida was first described and named by E. O. Wooton and Paul Carpenter Standley in 1913 under the name Herrickia horrida. It was later combined with the rest of Herrickia into the very large Aster genus in a 1937 publication. In 2004 Luc Brouillet published a paper arguing for its restoration as Herrickia horrida along with a general reorganization of species into a restored genus, Herrickia. However, as of 2023 Plants of the World Online (POWO) accepts the 1995 description by Guy L. Nesom as Eurybia horrida as does World Flora Online (WFO) and the USDA Natural Resources Conservation Service PLANTS database (PLANTS). However, the Flora of North America follows its classification in Herrickia.

=== Names ===
Eurybia horrida is known by the common names "spiny aster" and "horrid herrickia", the later being a translation of its original botanical Latin name.

== Range ==
Eurybia horrida has a very limited range in the upper basin of the Canadian River mainly in New Mexico, but also into parts of southern Colorado. It is recorded by the PLANTS database and by the New Mexico Rare Plant Technical Council as growing in just Las Animas County, Colorado and four northern counties of New Mexico, Colfax, Mora, Harding, and San Miguel.
