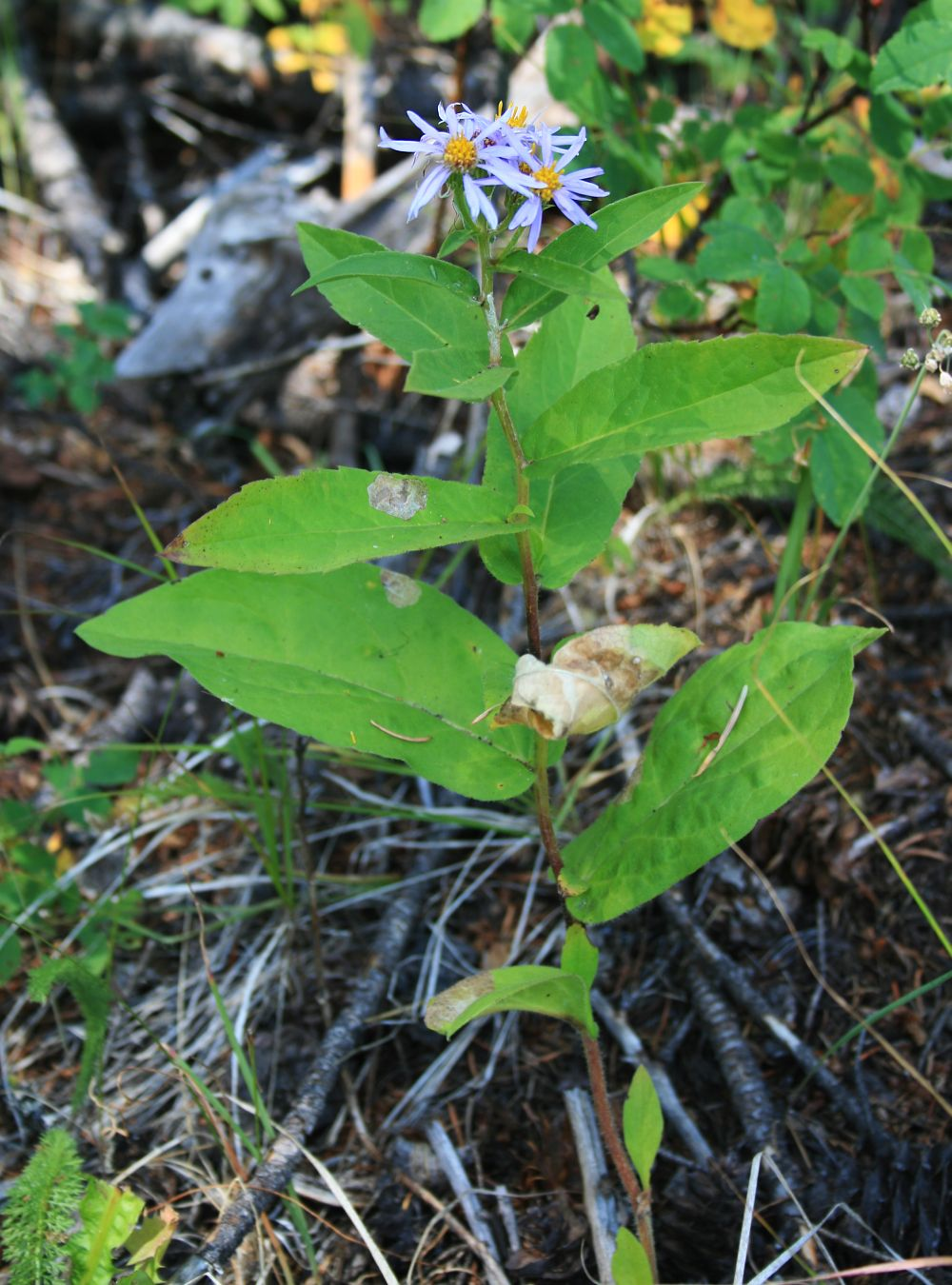

Conservation status
- Secure (NatureServe)

Scientific classification
- Kingdom: Plantae
- Clade: Tracheophytes
- Clade: Angiosperms
- Clade: Eudicots
- Clade: Asterids
- Order: Asterales
- Family: Asteraceae
- Genus: Eurybia
- Species: E. conspicua

Binomial name
- Eurybia conspicua (Lindl.) G.L.Nesom

Synonyms
- Aster conspicuus Lindl.; Aster forwoodii S.Watson

= Eurybia conspicua =

Western showy aster

Species of flowering plant

Eurybia conspicua, commonly known as the western showy aster, is a North American species of plants in the family Asteraceae. It is native to western Canada (from Manitoba to British Columbia) and the western United States (northern Cascades, northern Rockies, Black Hills, and other mountains of Washington, Oregon, Idaho, Montana, Wyoming, and South Dakota).

Eurybia conspicua is a perennial spreading by means of underground rhizomes, thus forming loose clonal colonies. Each plant can produce a flat-topped array of 5-50 flower heads, each head with 12–35 blue or violet ray florets surrounding 48–55 yellow disc florets.
