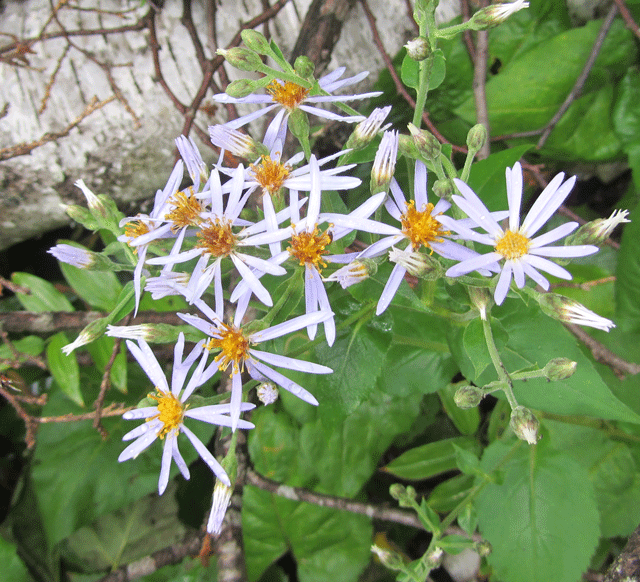

Conservation status
- Vulnerable (NatureServe)

Scientific classification
- Kingdom: Plantae
- Clade: Tracheophytes
- Clade: Angiosperms
- Clade: Eudicots
- Clade: Asterids
- Order: Asterales
- Family: Asteraceae
- Genus: Eurybia
- Species: E. furcata

Binomial name
- Eurybia furcata (E.S.Burgess) G.L.Nesom

Synonyms
- Aster furcatus E.S.Burgess

= Eurybia furcata =

Species of flowering plant

Eurybia furcata, commonly called forked aster, is an herbaceous perennial in the family Asteraceae. It is native primarily to the Great Lakes region and the Ozark Mountains in the United States. It is uncommon throughout its range, and occurs in the states of Michigan and Wisconsin in the north, south through Nebraska, Illinois, Iowa, and Indiana, and into Missouri and Arkansas. The species is intolerant of shade and is typically found on rocky, north-facing slopes, especially those composed of limestone, dolomite, or sandstone. It can also be found in seeps on bluffs, in moist woods along streams, and occasionally in disturbed sites. It is included in the Center for Plant Conservation's National Collection of Endangered Plants.
