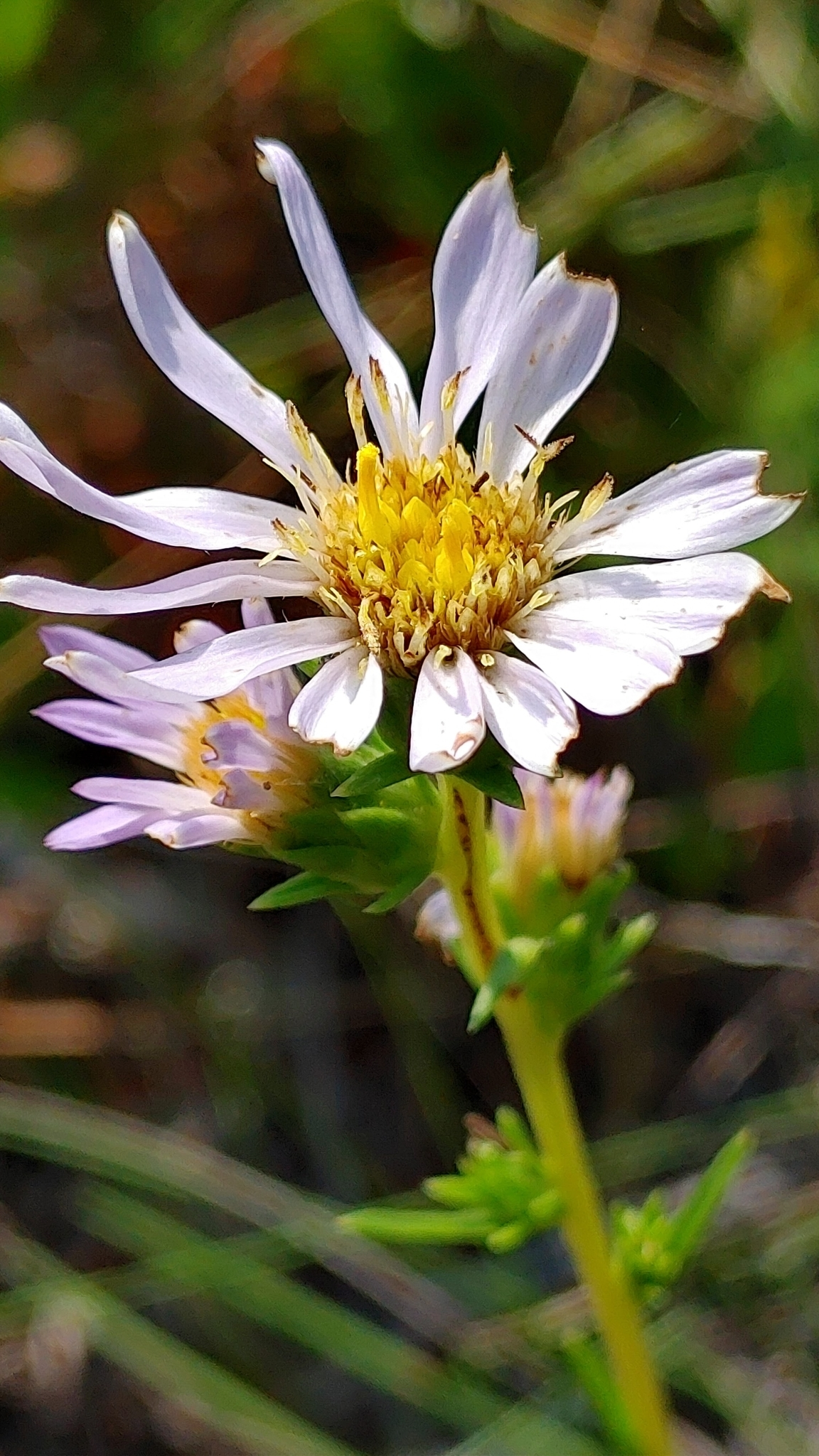

Conservation status
- Critically Imperiled (NatureServe)

Scientific classification
- Kingdom: Plantae
- Clade: Tracheophytes
- Clade: Angiosperms
- Clade: Eudicots
- Clade: Asterids
- Order: Asterales
- Family: Asteraceae
- Genus: Eurybia
- Species: E. spinulosa

Binomial name
- Eurybia spinulosa (Chapm.) G.L.Nesom

Synonyms
- Aster spinulosus Chapm.; Heleastrum spinulosum (Chapm.) Greene

= Eurybia spinulosa =

Apalachicola aster

Species of flowering plant

Eurybia spinulosa, commonly called the Apalachicola aster or pinewoods aster, is a perennial herb in the family Asteraceae. It is native to the south eastern United States, where it is present only in the Florida panhandle. Due to its restricted habitat, which is confined to the Apalachicola River drainage, as well as to ongoing development in these areas, the species is of serious conservation concern. It has been listed as critically imperiled by the Nature Conservancy and endangered by the state of Florida.

Flowers emerge between May and July to show pale purple ray florets and yellow disc florets.
