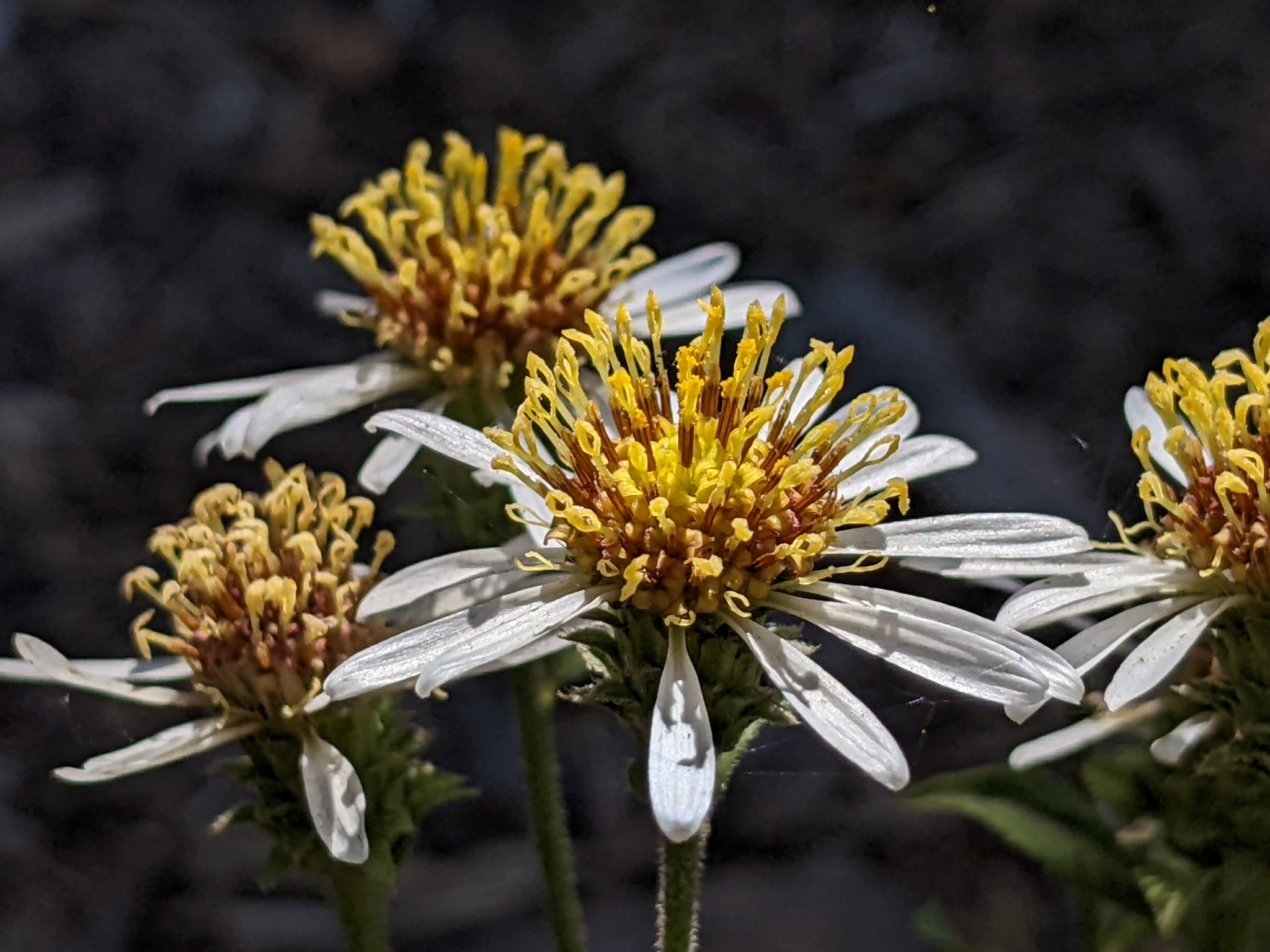

Conservation status
- Apparently Secure (NatureServe)

Scientific classification
- Kingdom: Plantae
- Clade: Tracheophytes
- Clade: Angiosperms
- Clade: Eudicots
- Clade: Asterids
- Order: Asterales
- Family: Asteraceae
- Genus: Eurybia
- Species: E. radulina

Binomial name
- Eurybia radulina (A.Gray) G.L.Nesom

Synonyms
- Aster eliasii A.Nelson; Aster radulinus A.Gray; Weberaster radulinus (A.Gray) Á.Löve & D.Löve

= Eurybia radulina =

Roughleaf aster

Species of flowering plant

Eurybia radulina (formerly Aster radulinus), commonly known as the roughleaf aster, is an herbaceous perennial in the family Asteraceae. It is native to western North America, where it is present primarily west of the Cascade Range in both Canada (British Columbia including Vancouver Island) and the United States (Washington, Oregon, and California including the Channel Islands). Its habitats include dry rock outcrops, slopes, edges of forests, and oak woodlands.
