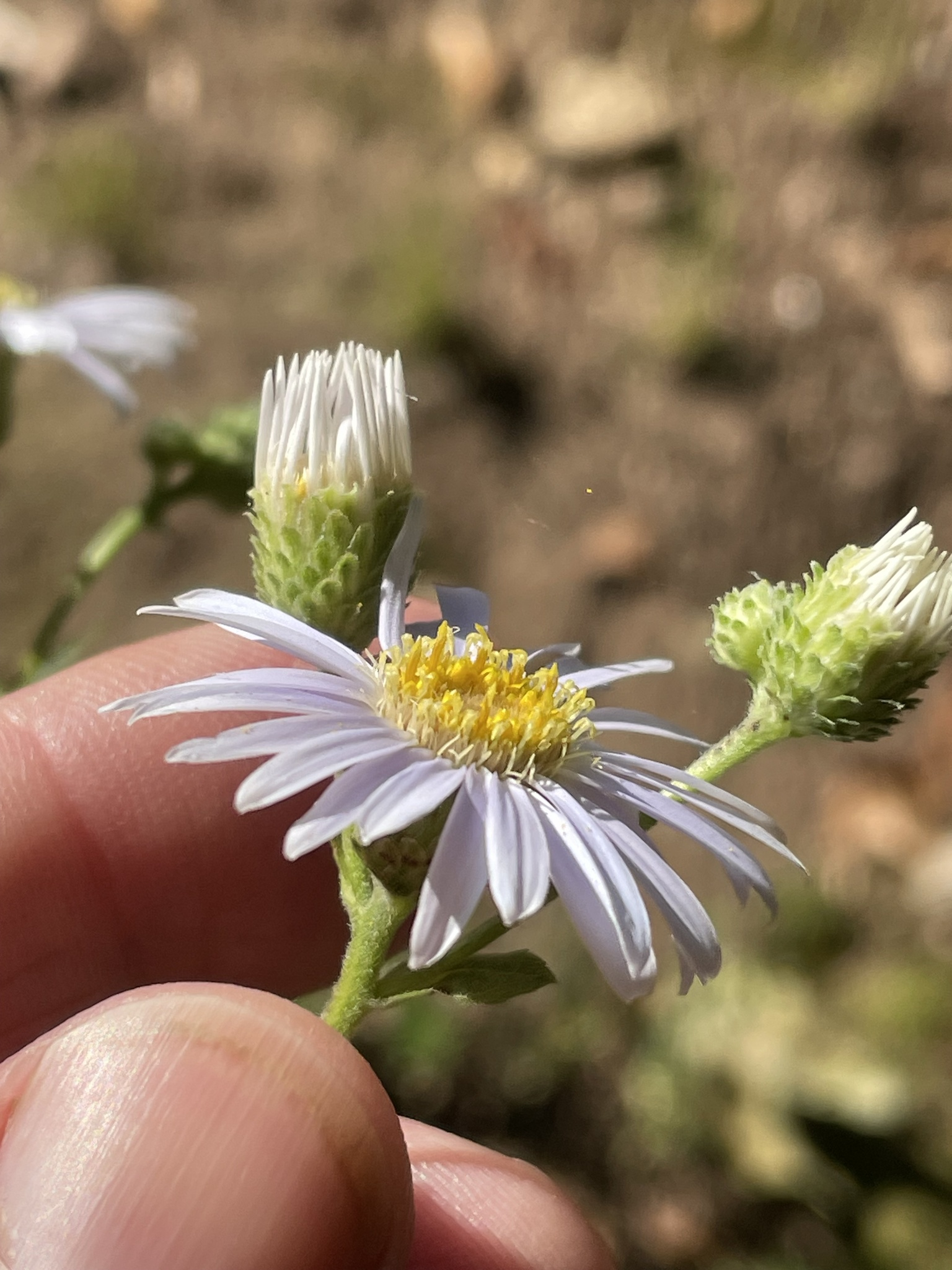

Conservation status
- Imperiled (NatureServe)

Scientific classification
- Kingdom: Plantae
- Clade: Tracheophytes
- Clade: Angiosperms
- Clade: Eudicots
- Clade: Asterids
- Order: Asterales
- Family: Asteraceae
- Genus: Eurybia
- Species: E. mirabilis

Binomial name
- Eurybia mirabilis (Torr. & A.Gray) G.L.Nesom

Synonyms
- Aster mirabilis Torr. & A.Gray

= Eurybia mirabilis =

Bouquet aster

Species of flowering plant

Eurybia mirabilis, commonly known as the bouquet aster or dwarf aster, is an herbaceous perennial in the family Asteraceae. It is endemic to the lower Piedmont of North Carolina and South Carolina in the southeastern United States. Within this small range it is found only infrequently, making it of conservation concern. The species is now largely confined to inaccessible bluffs due to the conversion of other habitats to farmland. It typically grows in deciduous or mixed deciduous woods, as well as on slopes or alluvial plains. Basic to neutral soils are usually preferred. Its flower heads emerge in the late summer to early fall and show white to lavender rays with pale yellow centres sometimes tinged with purple.
