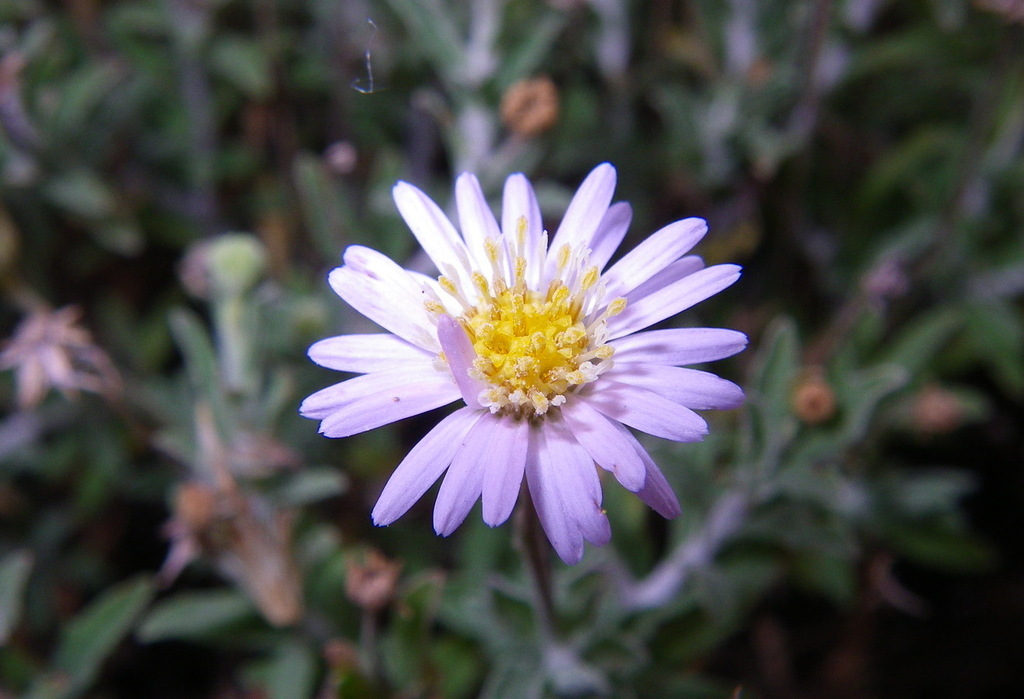
- Moree Plains, NSW May 2010

Scientific classification
- Kingdom: Plantae
- Clade: Tracheophytes
- Clade: Angiosperms
- Clade: Eudicots
- Clade: Asterids
- Order: Asterales
- Family: Asteraceae
- Genus: Camptacra
- Species: C. perdita

Binomial name
- Camptacra perdita A.R.Bean

= Camptacra perdita =

Species of flowering plant

Camptacra perdita is a species of flowering plant in the Asteraceae family It is native to eastern Australia (Queensland, and New South Wales)

Camptacra perdita was first described in 2020 by Anthony Bean.

== Description ==
Iit is an erect herb growing up to 35 cm high, with stems that are very woolly and a snowy white. The leaves are 1.1 to 5 mm wide (excluding the marginal teeth). There are abundant glandular hairs on the outer involucral bracts, and the lobes of the disc florets are hairy-glandular.

Camptacra perdita differs from C. barbata by its white, densely-woolly hairy stems, and its glandular-hairy involucral bracts.

It has been found in grassland on heavy black soils, with flowering and fruiting having been observed in March, May, September, October and November.

== Gallery ==
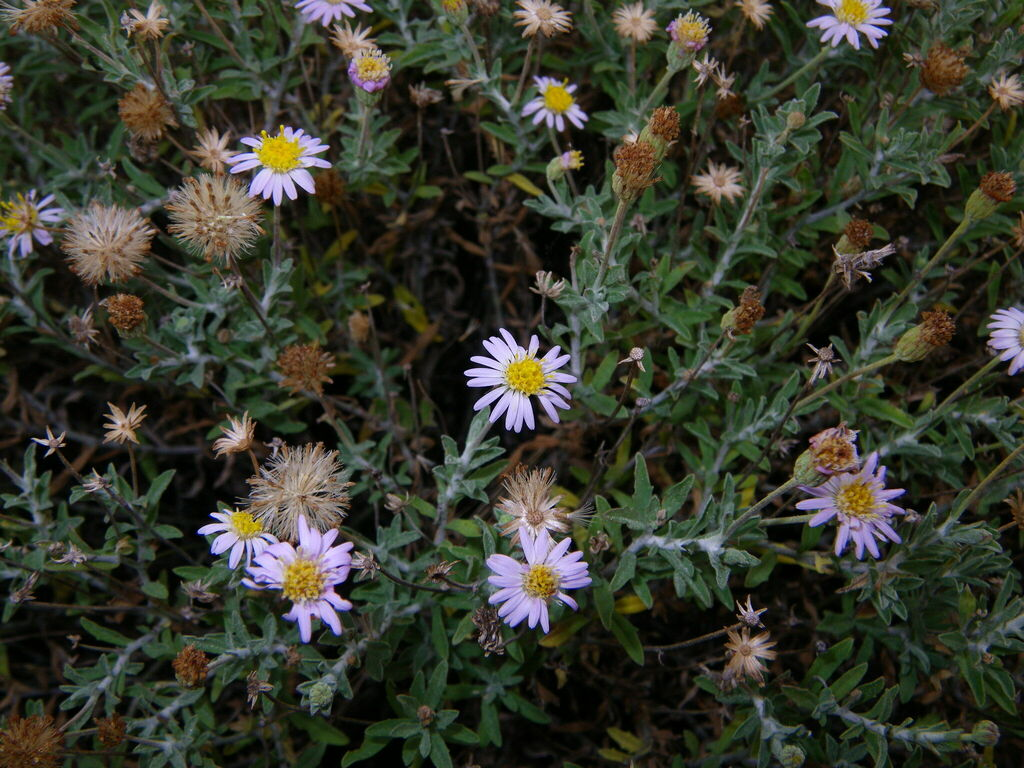

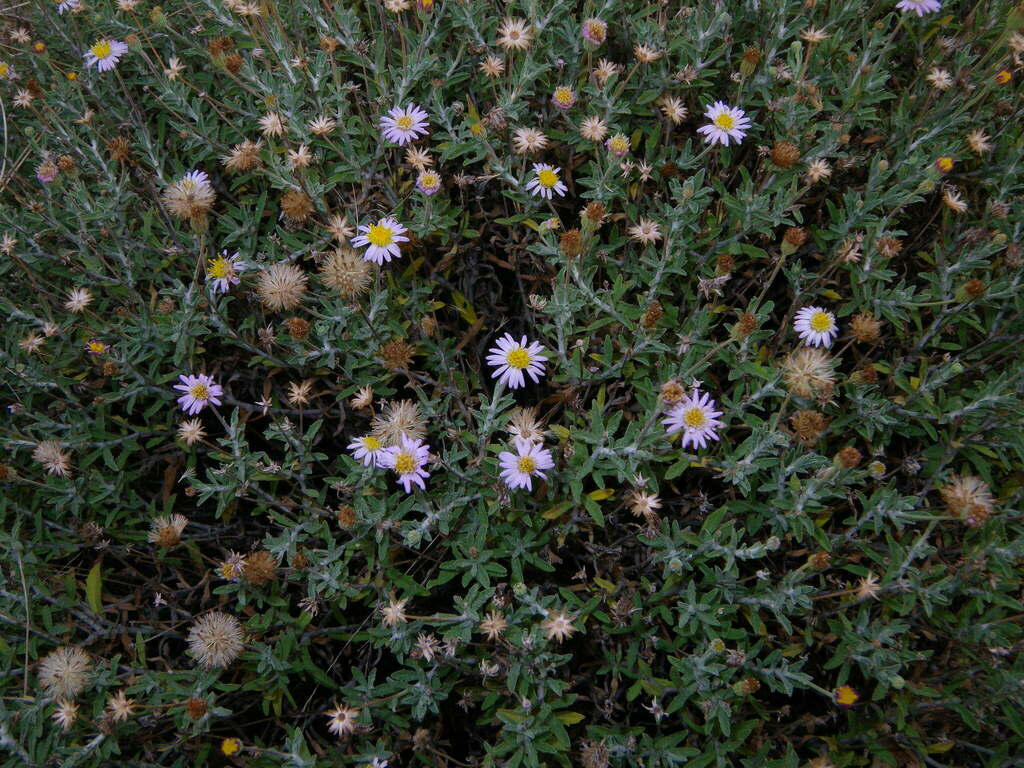
