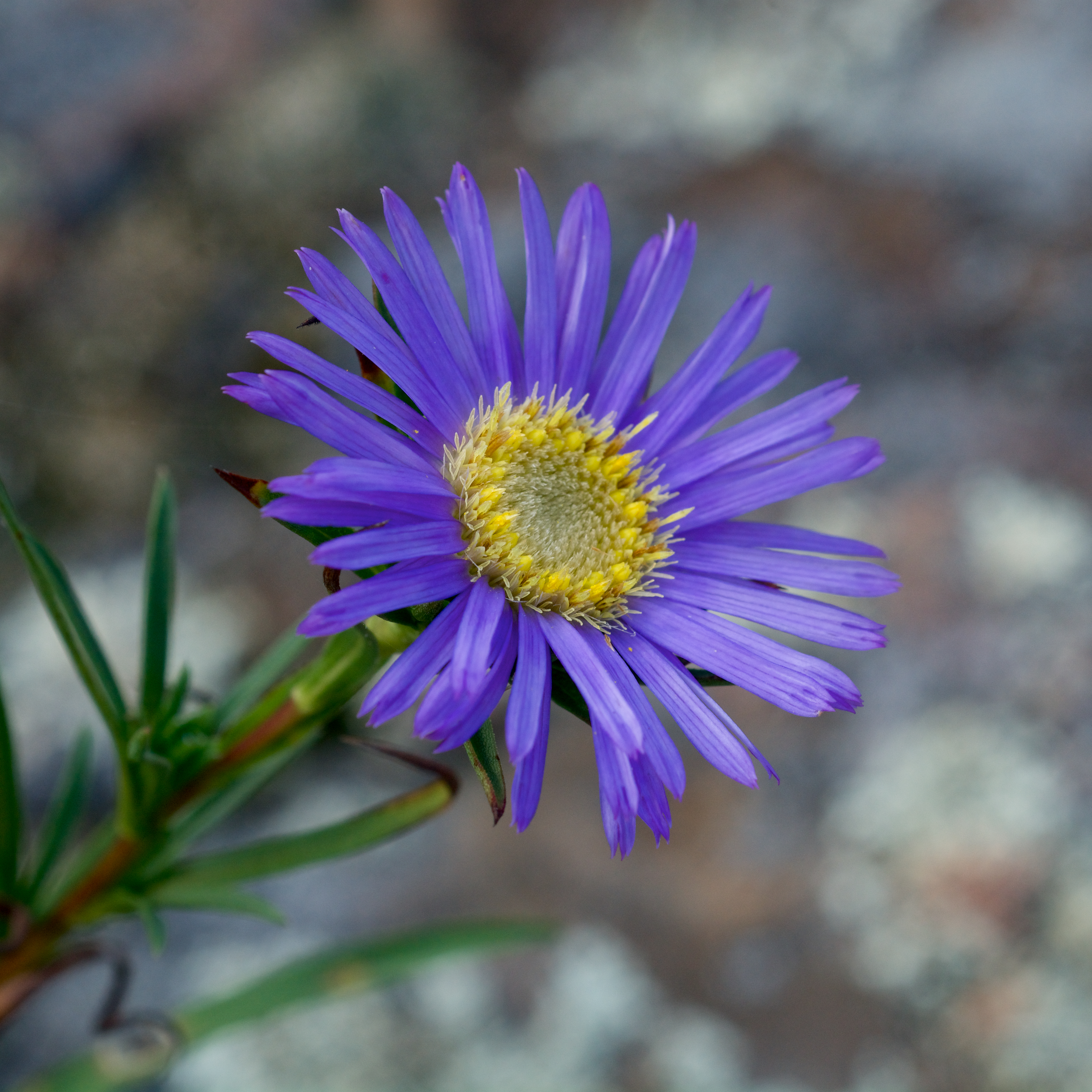

Conservation status
- Apparently Secure (NatureServe)

Scientific classification
- Kingdom: Plantae
- Clade: Tracheophytes
- Clade: Angiosperms
- Clade: Eudicots
- Clade: Asterids
- Order: Asterales
- Family: Asteraceae
- Genus: Eurybia
- Species: E. hemispherica

Binomial name
- Eurybia hemispherica (Alexander) G.L.Nesom

Synonyms
- Synonymy: Aster hemisphericus 1933Alexander; Aster gattingeri Alexander 1933 not (Chapm. ex A. Gray) Kuntze 1891; Aster paludosus subsp. hemisphericus (Alexander) Cronquist; Aster paludosus var. hemisphericus (Alexander) Waterf.; Aster pedionomus Alexander; Aster verutifoliu] Alexander; Heleastrum hemisphericum (Alexander ex Alexander) Shinners

= Eurybia hemispherica =

Southern prairie aster

Species of flowering plant

Eurybia hemispherica, commonly known as the southern prairie aster, is an herbaceous plant in the composite family (Asteraceae). It is native to the south-central United States, primarily the lower Mississippi Valley and southeastern Great Plains, from Kansas south to Texas and east to Kentucky, Tennessee, and the Florida Panhandle. Its natural habitat is typically in upland prairies or dry savannas. It is less commonly found in open moist areas, in sandy-loamy soil.

Eurybia hemispherica is a perennial, growing up to 120 cm tall. Its leaves are linear, glabrous, and somewhat shiny. It produces flowers in late summer and fall. The inflorescence is elongated, like a spike or raceme. Its heads have purple ray flowers.

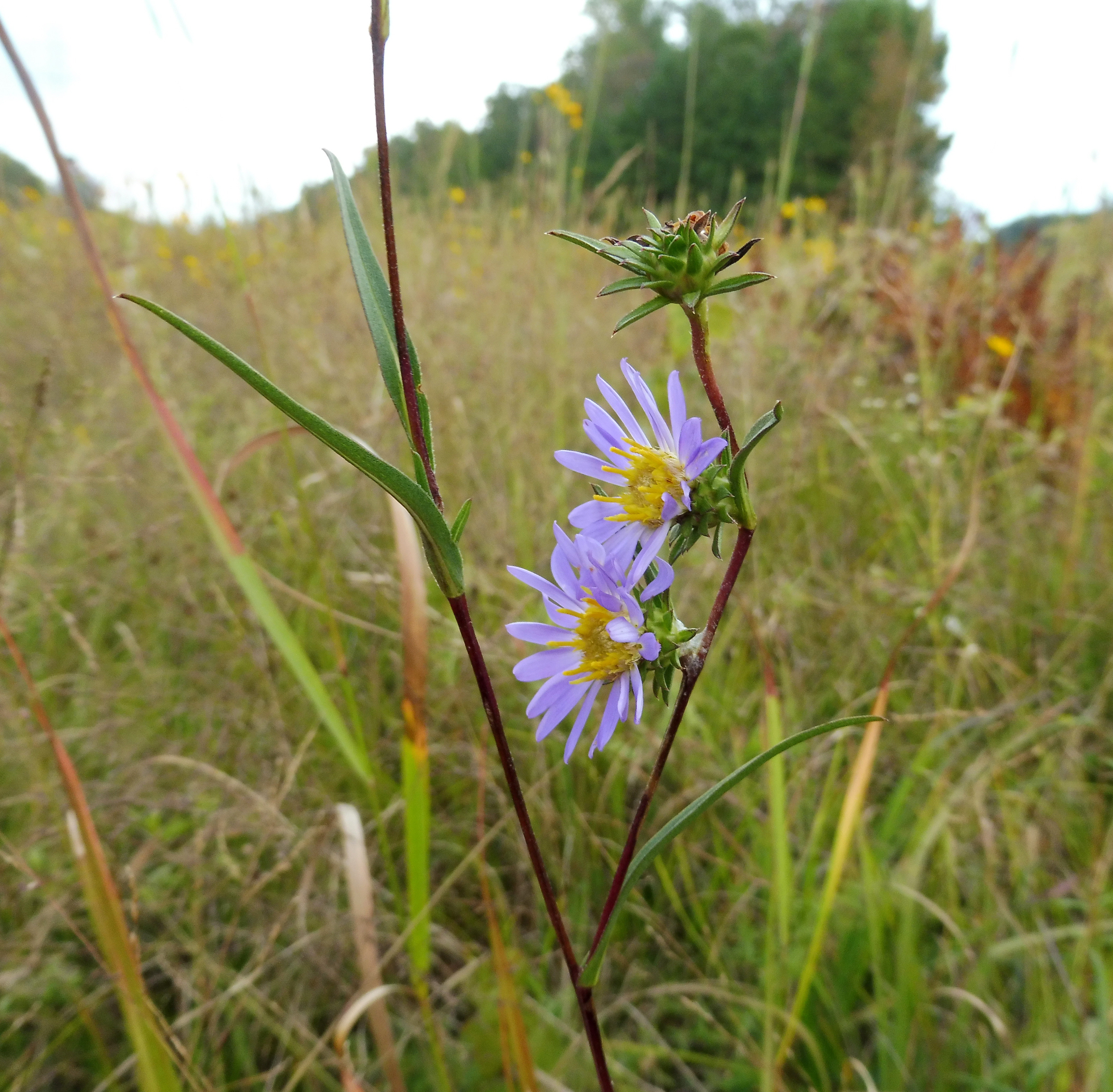
Linear leaves and a spike-like inflorescence are diagnostic for this species
