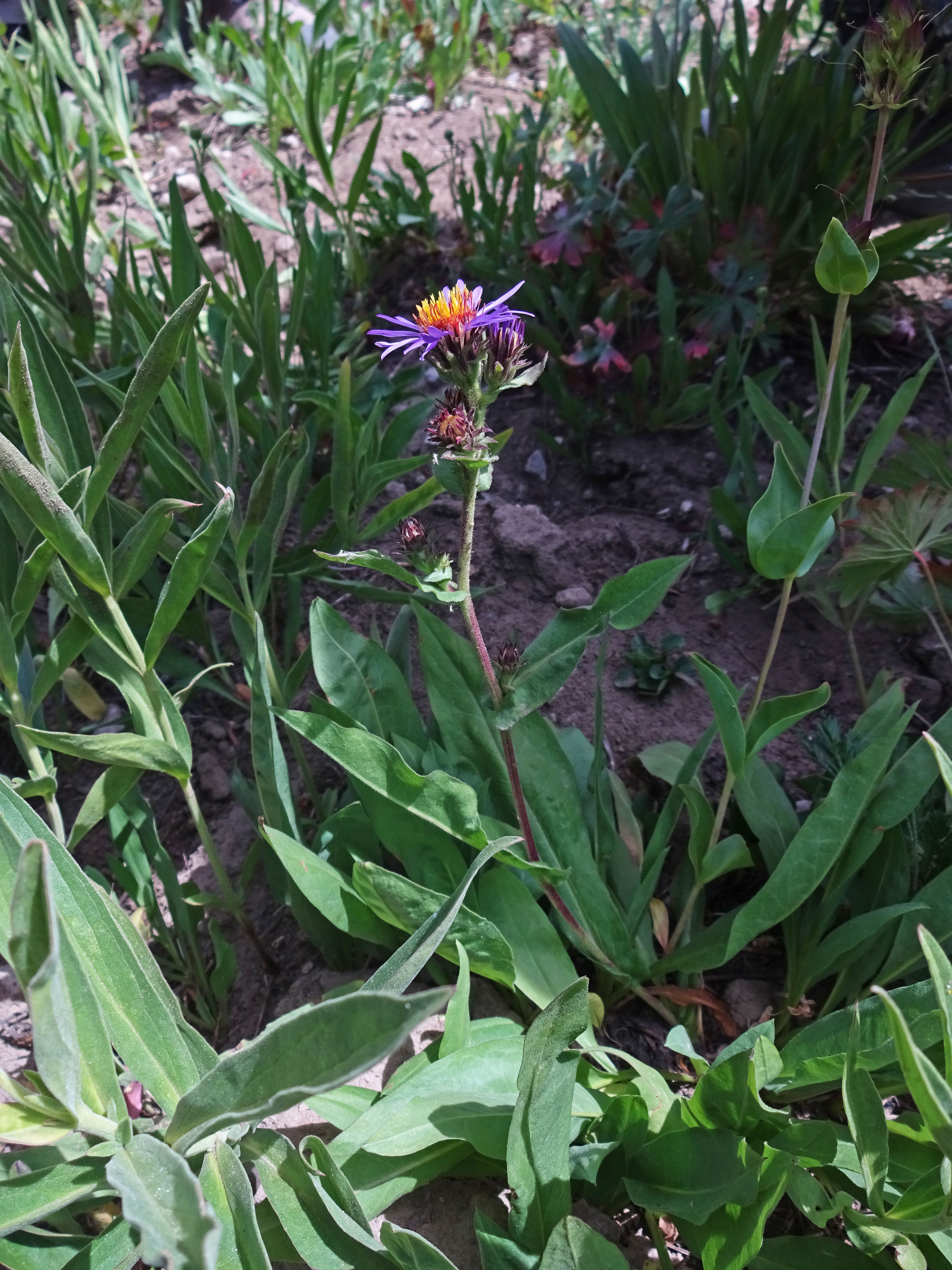
- In Utah

Conservation status
- Secure (NatureServe)

Scientific classification
- Kingdom: Plantae
- Clade: Tracheophytes
- Clade: Angiosperms
- Clade: Eudicots
- Clade: Asterids
- Order: Asterales
- Family: Asteraceae
- Genus: Eurybia
- Species: E. integrifolia

Binomial name
- Eurybia integrifolia (Nutt.) G.L.Nesom

Synonyms
- Aster amplexifolius Rydb.; Aster integrifolius Nutt.

= Eurybia integrifolia =

Thickstem aster

Species of flowering plant

Eurybia integrifolia, (formerly Aster integrifolius) commonly called the thickstem aster, is an herbaceous perennial in the family Asteraceae. It is native to the western United States where it grows primarily in the Rocky Mountains, the Great Basin, and the Sierra Nevada in Washington, Idaho, Montana, Wyoming, Utah, Oregon, Nevada, and California.
