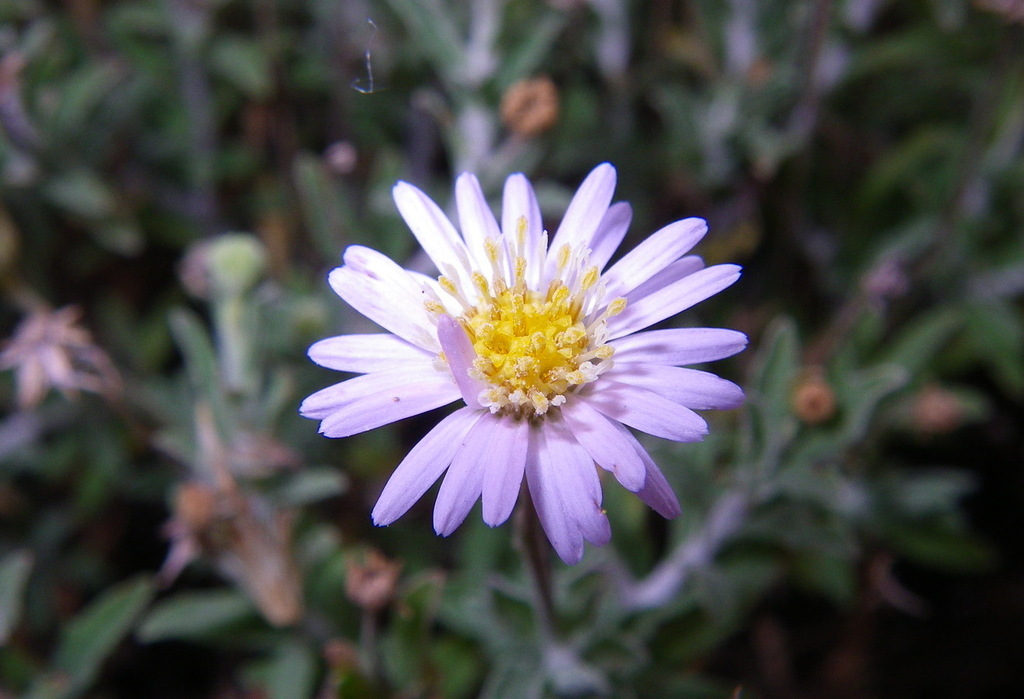
- Camptacra perdita, Moree Plains, NSW

Scientific classification
- Kingdom: Plantae
- Clade: Tracheophytes
- Clade: Angiosperms
- Clade: Eudicots
- Clade: Asterids
- Order: Asterales
- Family: Asteraceae
- Subfamily: Asteroideae
- Tribe: Astereae
- Subtribe: Brachyscominae
- Genus: Camptacra; N.T.Burb.

= Camptacra =

Genus of flowering plants

Camptacra is a genus of flowering plants in the family Asteraceae.

Species

- Camptacra barbata N.T.Burb. - New South Wales, Queensland
- Camptacra brachycomoides (F.Muell.) N.T.Burb. - Northern Territory
- Camptacra gracilis (Benth.) Lander - Northern Territory, Queensland, Western Australia, New Guinea
- Camptacra perdita A.R.Bean - Queensland New South Wales
