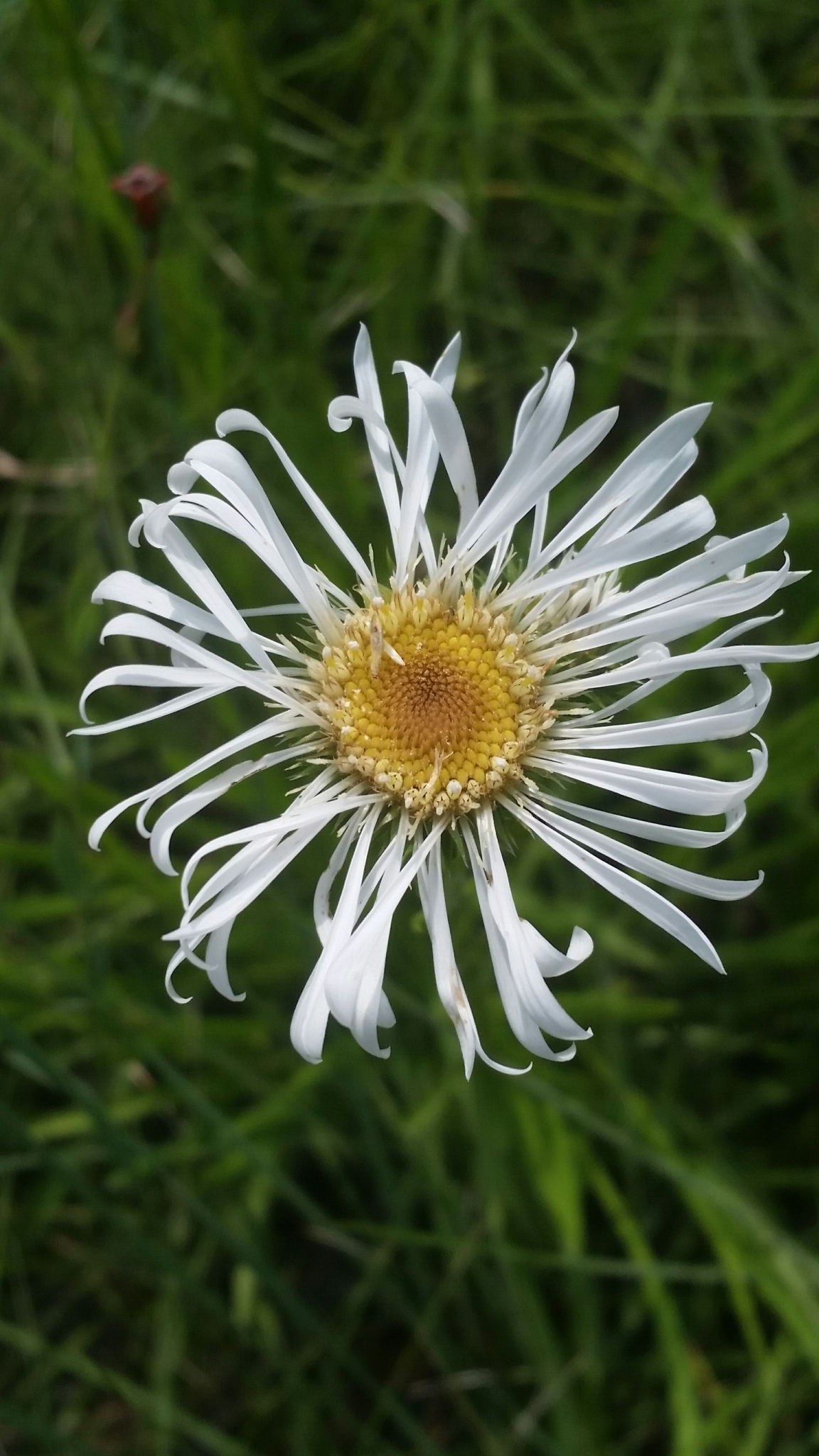

Conservation status
- Vulnerable (NatureServe)

Scientific classification
- Kingdom: Plantae
- Clade: Tracheophytes
- Clade: Angiosperms
- Clade: Eudicots
- Clade: Asterids
- Order: Asterales
- Family: Asteraceae
- Genus: Eurybia
- Species: E. eryngiifolia

Binomial name
- Eurybia eryngiifolia (Torr. & A.Gray) G.L.Nesom

Synonyms
- Aster eryngiifolius Torr. & A.Gray; Heleastrum chapmanii (Torr. & A.Gray) Greene; Prionopsis chapmanii Torr. & A.Gray

= Eurybia eryngiifolia =

Thistleleaf aster

Species of flowering plant

Eurybia eryngiifolia, commonly known as the thistleleaf aster or coyote-thistle aster, is an herbaceous perennial in the family Asteraceae. It is native to the eastern United States where it is only present along the Florida panhandle and the nearby areas of southern Alabama and southwestern Georgia.
