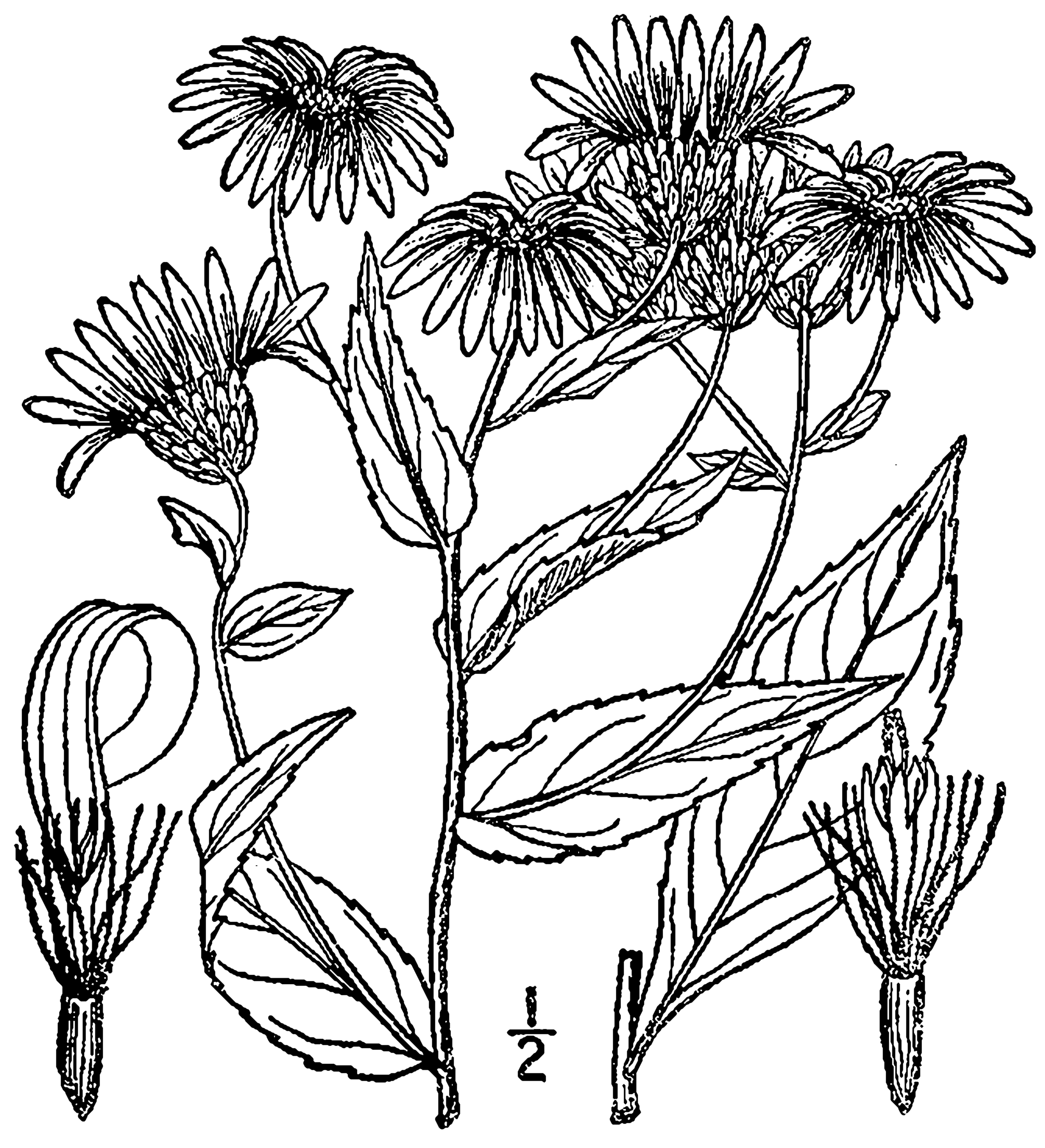

Conservation status
- Secure (NatureServe)

Scientific classification
- Kingdom: Plantae
- Clade: Tracheophytes
- Clade: Angiosperms
- Clade: Eudicots
- Clade: Asterids
- Order: Asterales
- Family: Asteraceae
- Genus: Eurybia
- Species: E. radula

Binomial name
- Eurybia radula (Aiton) G.L.Nesom

Synonyms
- Aster biflorus Michx.; Aster nudiflorus Nutt.; Aster radula Sol. ex Aiton; Aster strictus Pursh 1813 not Poir. 1811

= Eurybia radula =

Low rough aster

Species of flowering plant

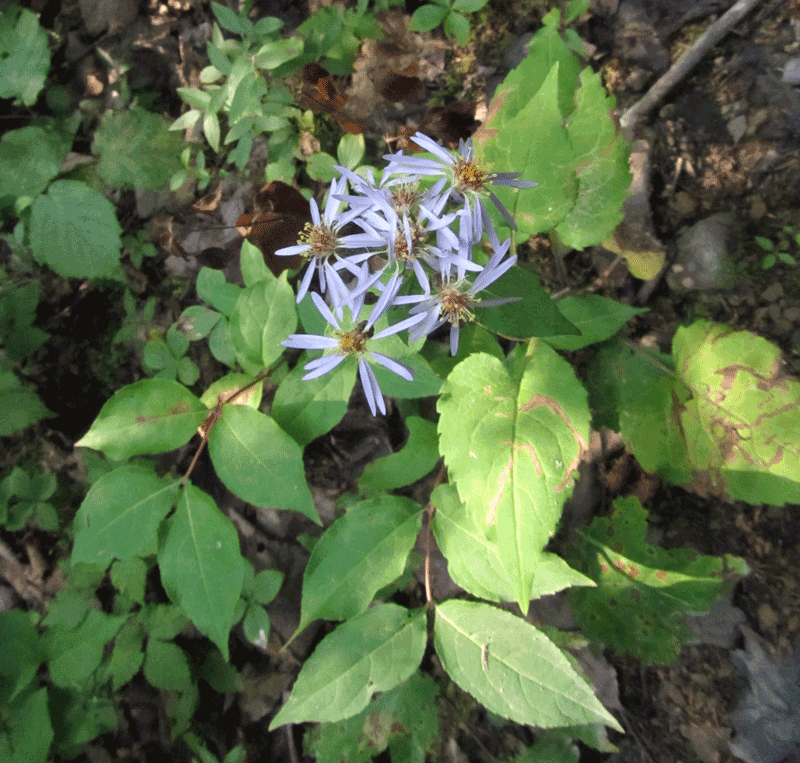
Photographed in Parc National du Lac Temiscouata, Quebec, Canada.

Eurybia radula, commonly known as the low rough aster or rough wood aster, is an herbaceous perennial in the family Asteraceae. It is native to eastern North America where it is present from Newfoundland and Labrador in the far northeast of Canada, west to Ontario and south to Kentucky and Virginia in the United States. The low rough aster is also present on the French overseas territory of St. Pierre and Miquelon just south of Newfoundland. It typically grows in wet soils in a wide variety of habitats from bogs and fens to creek shores to ditches. Although it is not considered threatened over most of its distribution, it is imperiled or possibly extirpated over much of its range in the United States. Its flower heads emerge in the late summer to early fall and show pale blue-violet rays with yellow centres.

== Taxonomy ==
One formerly recognised variety, Aster radula var. strictus (Pursh) A. Gray, is present in the northern part of its range including Newfoundland and Labrador, northern Quebec and northern Nova Scotia. It differs in being more slender and having only 1 to 8 heads, which is probably a response to the harsh climate. However, it is not commonly recognised due to the range of intermediates that exist from north to south and currently no combination (i.e. with var. mercan) currently exists in Eurybia.

The common name rough aster probably stems from a misreading of the Latin specific name radula, which actually means scraper. The word for rough is radulans, which is quite similar.

== Distribution and habitat ==
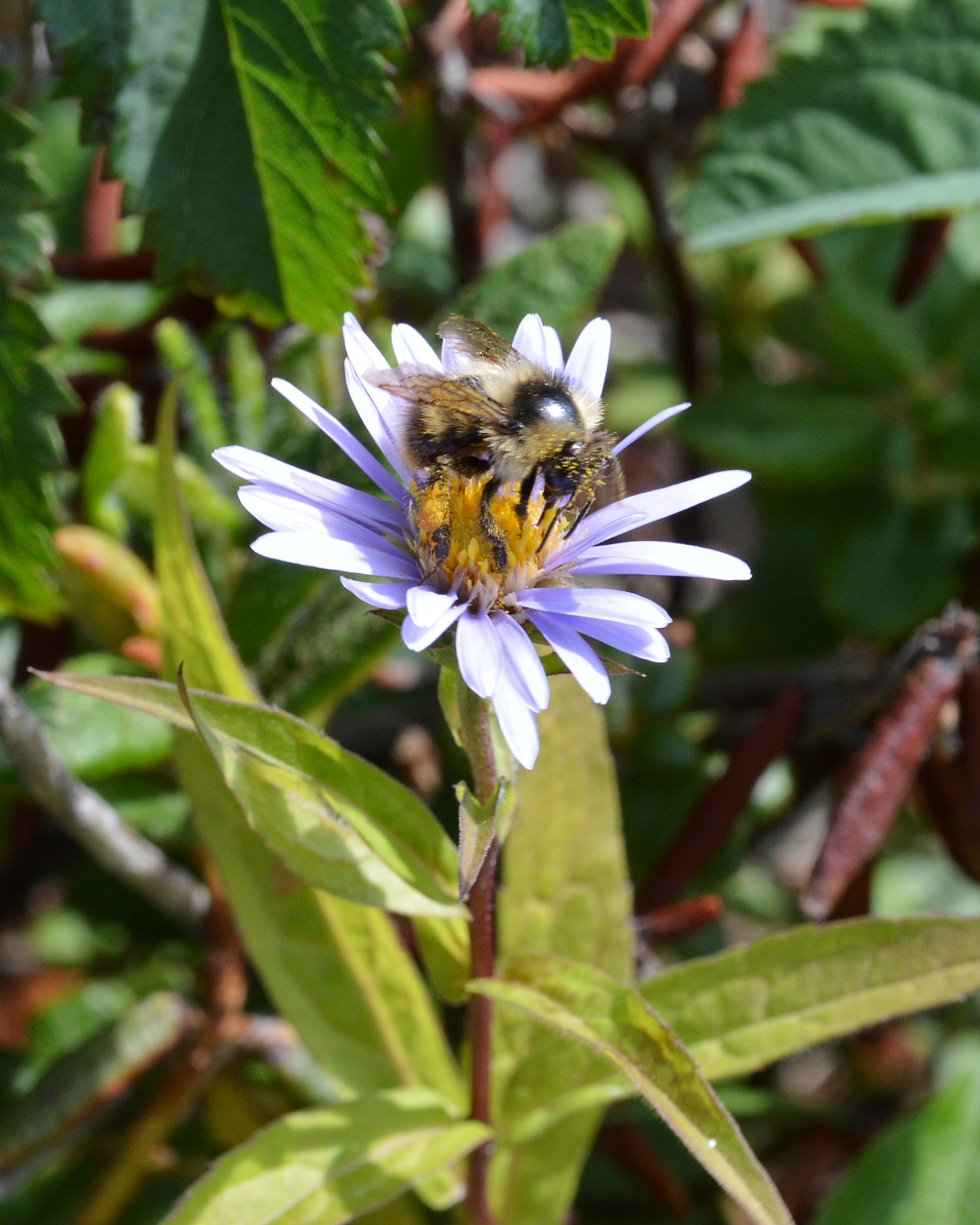
Bombus vagans bolsteri on Rough Wood Aster (Eurybia radula), Crow Head, Newfoundland

Eurybia radula is present in every province of Canada east of and including Ontario and is also present on the French territory of St. Pierre and Miquelon. Its northwestern limit is in the northeast of Ontario south of James Bay where it is rarely found. In the United States it can be found in every state from Maine south to Kentucky and Virginia, though it is not present in Ohio and westward. The species is considered endangered by the states of Connecticut, Kentucky, Maryland, New Jersey and New York.

The low rough aster grows in wet soils in a fairly wide variety of habitat. These include very wet locations with widely differing pH values such as in fens and sphagnum bogs. In addition it can be found on the shores of lakes and creeks, in wet meadows and in ditches. While the plant does not tolerate deep shade, it can be found in open boggy woods as well as along the edges and at the openings of wet spruce and tamarack larch forests. It can be found at elevations varying from sea level to more than 600 metres.
