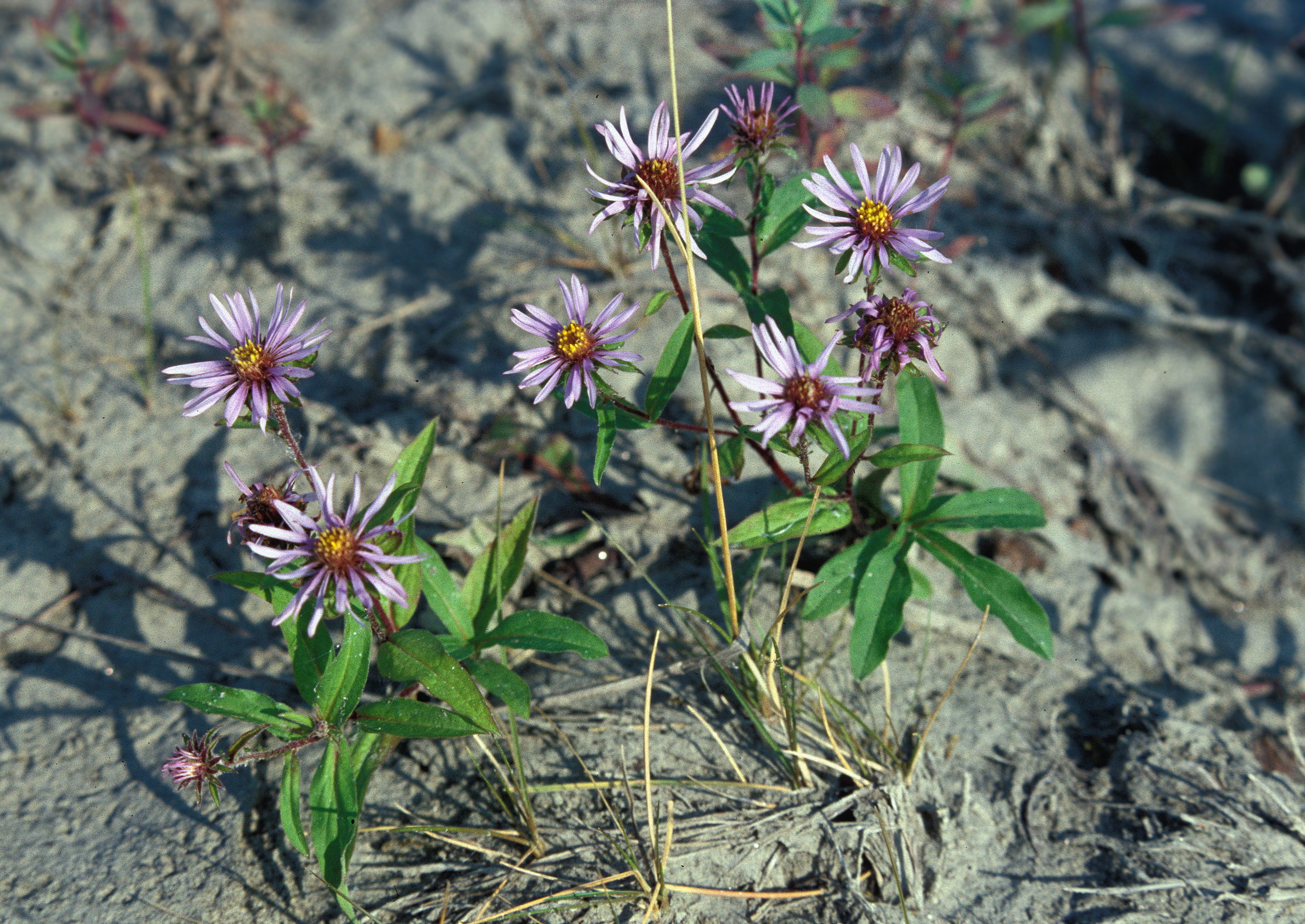
- Eurybia sibrica in Yukon

Conservation status
- Secure (NatureServe)

Scientific classification
- Kingdom: Plantae
- Clade: Tracheophytes
- Clade: Angiosperms
- Clade: Eudicots
- Clade: Asterids
- Order: Asterales
- Family: Asteraceae
- Genus: Eurybia
- Species: E. sibirica

Binomial name
- Eurybia sibirica (L.) G.L.Nesom

Synonyms
- Synonymy: Aster ammani Lindl. ex DC.; Aster behringensis Gand.; Aster biflorus DC.; Aster bracteatus Turcz. ex Herder; Aster conspicuus Fisch. ex Turcz.; Aster espenbergensis Nees; Aster giganteus (Hook.) Rydb.; Aster intybaceus Kunth & C.D.Bouché; Aster ircutianus DC.; Aster lacerus Lindl. ex DC; Aster montanus R.Br. ex Richardson; Aster prascottii Lindl. ex DC.; Aster pubescens Lam.; Aster richardsonii Spreng.; Aster sachalinensis Kudô; Aster salsuginosus Less.; Aster sibiricus L.; Aster tataricus Turcz. 1838 not L.f. 1782; Grindelia sibirica Spreng. ex Link; Aster subintegerrimus (Trautv.) Ostenf. & Resvoll, syn of subsp. subintegerrimus

= Eurybia sibirica =

Species of plant

Eurybia sibirica, commonly known as the Siberian aster or arctic aster, is an herbaceous perennial native to north western North America and northern Eurasia. It is found largely in open areas of subarctic boreal forests, though it is also found in a wide variety of habitats in the region. It is similar in appearance to Eurybia merita, but their ranges overlap only near the border between the US and Canada, where E. sibirica is generally found at higher elevations.

Eurybia sibirica is a perennial herb up to 60 cm (2 feet) tall, spreading by means of thin underground rhizomes. The plant produces flower heads either one at a time or in dense flat-topped arrays of 2–50 heads. Each head contains 12–50 white, purple, or pale violet ray florets surrounding 25–125 yellow disc florets. The involucral bracts are reddish-purple (anthocyanic).

== Distribution and habitat ==
Eurybia sibirica is present in much of the subarctic region of world, in northwestern North America and Northern Europe and Northern Asia. It is common in northern Asia (Buryatia, Yakutia, Mongolia, Japan, Chinese Province of Heilongjiang and other parts of North of China). It is also found in European Russia and Scandinavia, as well as northern and western Canada (Alberta, British Columbia, and all 3 Arctic provinces) and United States (Alaska plus the mountains of Washington, Idaho, and Montana). It is found at heights ranging from sea level up to 2200 metres in sandy or gravely soils in disturbed or open areas of boreal forests. It is also present in wet meadows, in open areas of aspen and spruce woods and along riparian thickets. In addition, it is common growing in sandy or gravelly stream flats, along stream banks and the shores of lakes, on bluffs, in sand dunes and other sandy places, and in both sub-alpine and mountain meadows.

Subspecies

- Eurybia sibirica subsp. sibirica
- Eurybia sibirica subsp. subintegerrima (Trautv.) Greuter
