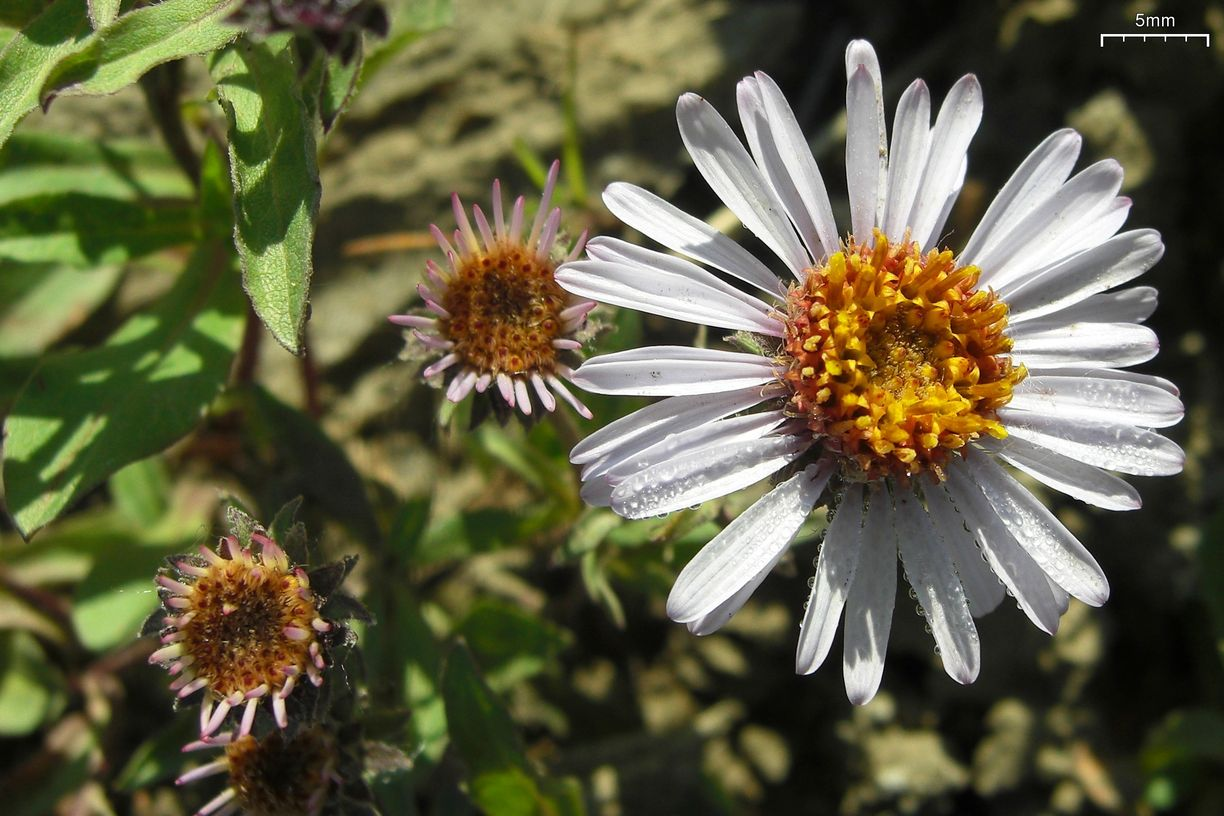

Conservation status
- Secure (NatureServe)

Scientific classification
- Kingdom: Plantae
- Clade: Tracheophytes
- Clade: Angiosperms
- Clade: Eudicots
- Clade: Asterids
- Order: Asterales
- Family: Asteraceae
- Genus: Eurybia
- Species: E. merita

Binomial name
- Eurybia merita (A.Nels.) G.L.Nesom

Synonyms
- Aster meritus A.Nels.; Aster montanus var. arcticus Torr. & A.Gray; Aster richardsonii var. meritus (A.Nelson) Raup; Aster sibiricus var. meritus (A.Nelson) Raup

= Eurybia merita =

Subalpine aster

Species of flowering plant

Eurybia merita, commonly known as the subalpine aster or arctic aster (not to be confused with Eurybia sibirica, which shares the latter common name), is an herbaceous perennial native to northwestern North America, primarily from the Interior Mountains and Plateau system and Rocky Mountains in Canada, stretching south to Utah and extreme northern California. It is found largely in drier, open areas, generally at subalpine levels in mountains, though in more northern areas it is more common at lower elevations. It is similar in appearance to Eurybia sibirica, but their ranges only overlap near the border between the US and Canada, where E. sibirica is generally found at higher elevations than its relative. The flowers emerge in the late summer and display purple to violet ray florets and pale or creamy yellow disc florets.

== Distribution and habitat ==
Eurybia merita is present in much of northwestern North America. There are also a few isolated populations in the Black Hills of South Dakota. The primary distribution is from Alberta and British Columbia in Canada, south as far as northern Utah and to Siskiyou County, California. It is found at heights ranging from 100 up to 3200 metres (330–10670 feet) in soils that range from mesic to dry. Open woods, rocky areas, clearings and recently burnt areas constitute its primary habitat. It may also be found along sandy, rocky or gravely creek banks. Within these habitats, it is most commonly associated with subalpine meadows and Douglas fir, lodgepole pine or spruce forests. While it is generally restricted to subalpine elevations in mountains, it is found at lower elevations in the north of its range.
