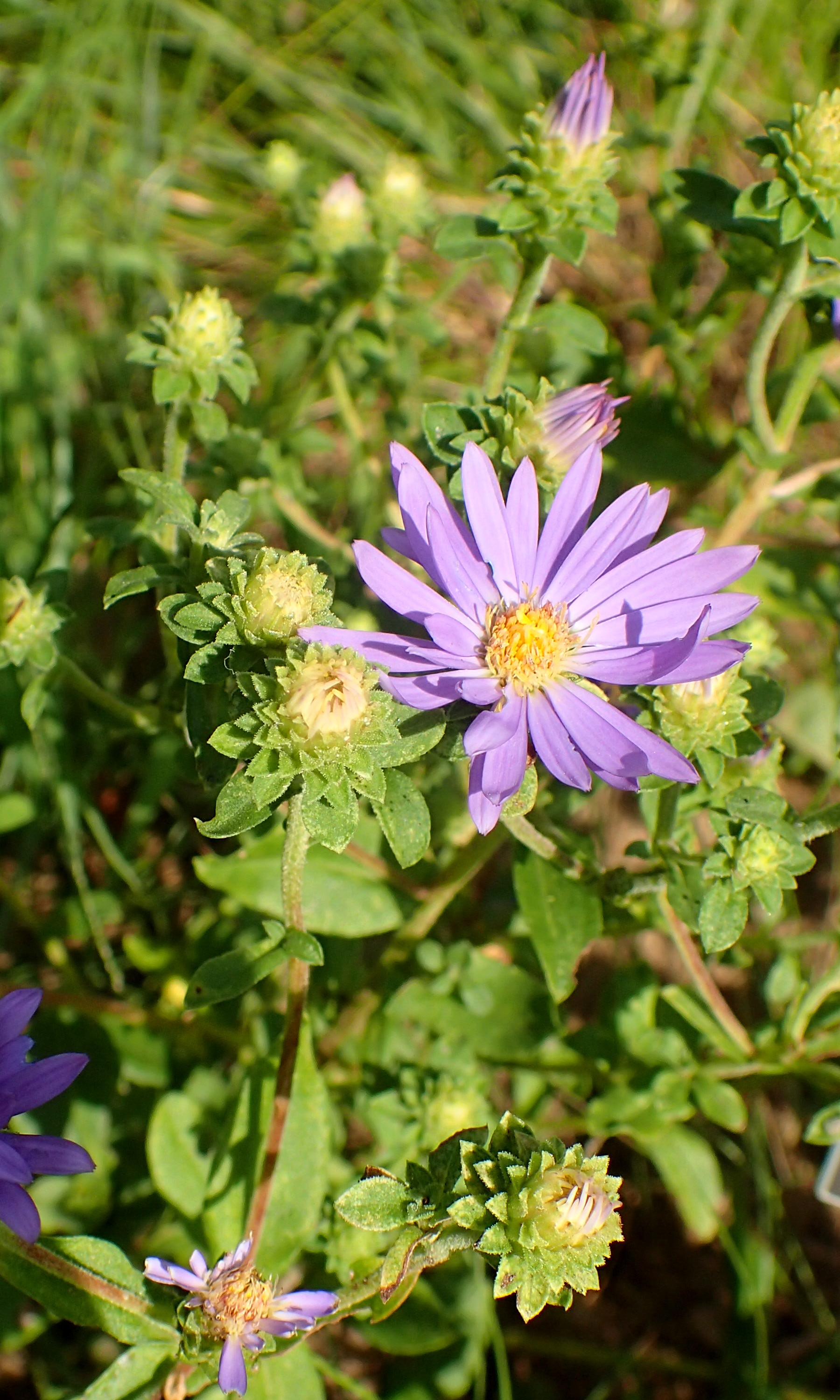

Conservation status
- Secure (NatureServe)

Scientific classification
- Kingdom: Plantae
- Clade: Tracheophytes
- Clade: Angiosperms
- Clade: Eudicots
- Clade: Asterids
- Order: Asterales
- Family: Asteraceae
- Genus: Eurybia
- Species: E. spectabilis

Binomial name
- Eurybia spectabilis (Aiton) G.L.Nesom

Synonyms
- Aster bellidiflorus Steud.; Aster commixtus (Nees) Kuntze; Aster elegans Willd.; Aster elegans var. elegans; Aster smallii Alexander; Aster speciosus Hornem.; Aster spectabilis Sol. ex Aiton; Biotia commixta (Nees) DC.; Eurybia commixta Nees

= Eurybia spectabilis =

Showy aster

Species of flowering plant

Eurybia spectabilis, commonly known as the eastern showy aster, simply showy aster or purple wood aster, is an herbaceous perennial native to the eastern United States. It is present along the coastal plain of the U.S. where it is most often found growing in dry, sandy soils. Although it is not considered threatened due to its extensive range, it is locally endangered in many states. The flowers appear in the fall and show ray florets that are a violet-purple and yellow disc florets. It is one of the parent species of the hybrid Eurybia × herveyi.

== Distribution and habitat ==
Eurybia spectabilis is present along the coastal plain of eastern North America. Its range stretches from Massachusetts and New York in the north, south to South Carolina, Georgia and Alabama. It is found primarily growing sandy soils, though occasionally it is present in dry clay. It can be found at elevations of 0 to 900 metres (0–3000 feet) near granite outcrops, in dry oak-pine woods, pine barrens, and in peat bogs. They are also present along the borders of woods, in clearings and fields as well as along roadsides.
