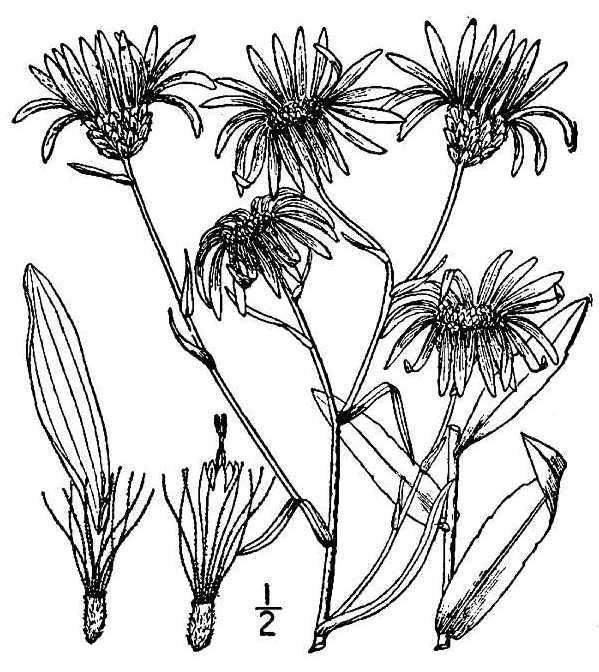
- Line drawing of the capitula, pappi and leaves

Conservation status
- Apparently Secure (NatureServe)

Scientific classification
- Kingdom: Plantae
- Clade: Tracheophytes
- Clade: Angiosperms
- Clade: Eudicots
- Clade: Asterids
- Order: Asterales
- Family: Asteraceae
- Genus: Eurybia
- Species: E. surculosa

Binomial name
- Eurybia surculosa (Michx.) G.L.Nesom

Synonyms
- Aster surculosus Michx.; Aster liatroides Muhl. ex DC.

= Eurybia surculosa =

Creeping aster

Species of flowering plant

Eurybia surculosa, commonly known as the creeping aster, is a herbaceous perennial in the family Asteraceae that was previously treated in the genus Aster. It is native to the eastern United States where it is found in sandy soils along the coastal plain, though when E. compacta is also present, it exists further inland in the southern Appalachian Mountains and the Cumberland Plateau. Although the species is not seriously threatened, it is locally endangered in Ohio, Virginia, and Alabama. The flowers, which have bluish violet ray florets and pale yellow disc florets that eventually turn purplish, emerge in summer and persist into the fall.

== Distribution and habitat ==
Eurybia surculosa is native to the eastern United States where it occurs along the coastal plain, especially in the north of its range, as well as in the southern Appalachians. It tends to not coexist with E. compacta, and where this plant occurs, E. surculosa is usually confined to inland areas and the mountains. There are isolated populations in Massachusetts and Connecticut in the north, and then a continuous range from Delaware and Maryland south through Virginia and the Carolinas to Georgia. To the west it is present in Alabama, Tennessee, Kentucky and Ohio, though it is absent in West Virginia. It typically grows at elevations of 200 to 1,500 meters (660 to 4,920 ft) in both dry and wet sandy soils. Its habitats include open areas, pinelands, oak scrub, clearings, bogs, as well as along roadsides.
