= Camptacra gracilis =

Scientific classification
- Kingdom: Plantae
- Clade: Tracheophytes
- Clade: Angiosperms
- Clade: Eudicots
- Clade: Asterids
- Order: Asterales
- Family: Asteraceae
- Genus: Camptacra
- Species: C. gracilis

Binomial name
- Camptacra gracilis (Benth.) Lander

Synonyms
- Eurybia gracilis Benth.

Species of flowering plant

Camptacra gracilis is a species of flowering plants in the family Asteraceae. It is native to northern Australia (Northern Territory, Queensland, Western Australia), and to the island of New Guinea.

Camptacra gracilis is an herb with divided leaves. Flower heads contain white ray florets and yellow disc florets.
