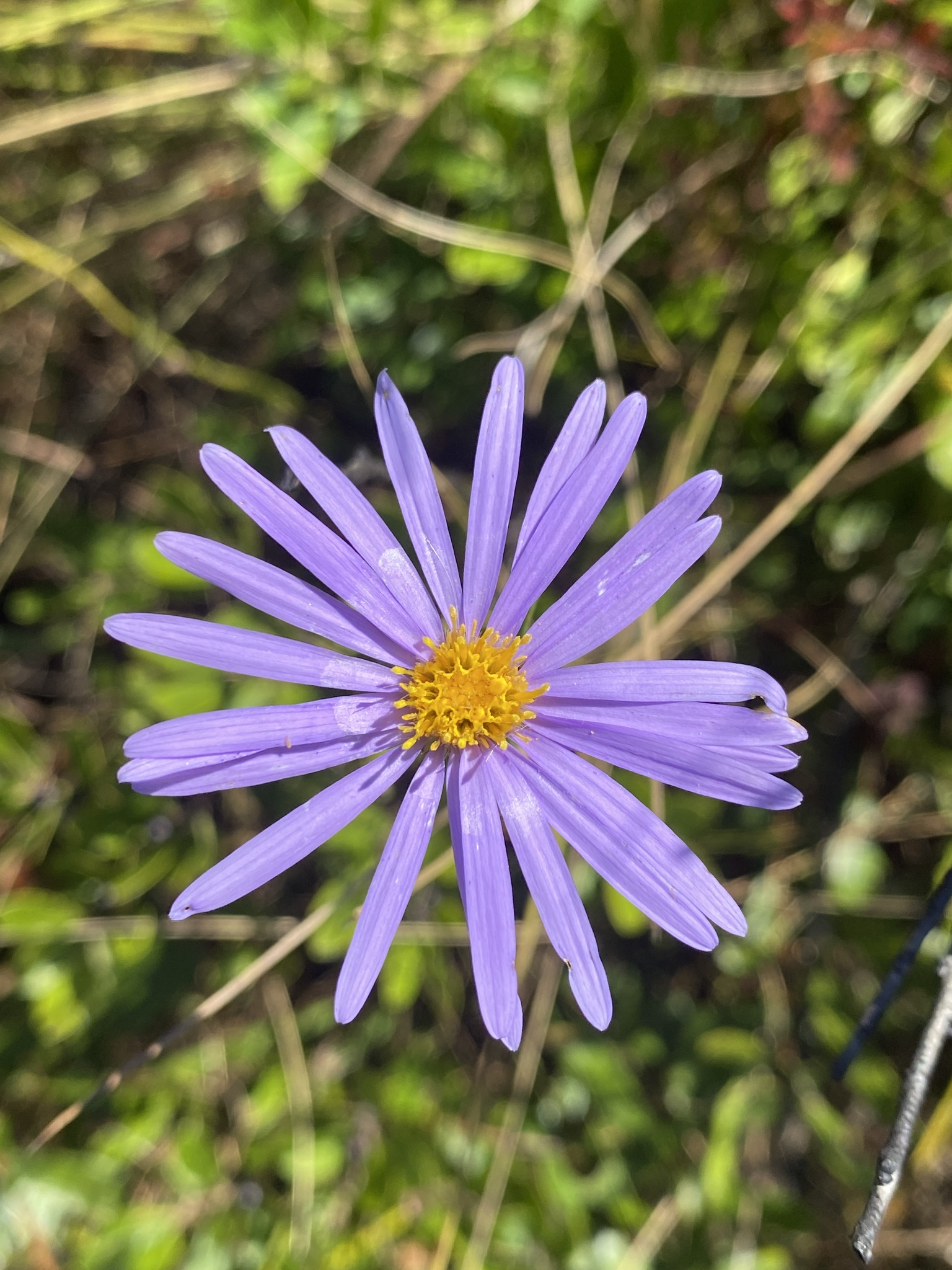

Scientific classification
- Kingdom: Plantae
- Clade: Tracheophytes
- Clade: Angiosperms
- Clade: Eudicots
- Clade: Asterids
- Order: Asterales
- Family: Asteraceae
- Genus: Eurybia
- Species: E. paludosa

Binomial name
- Eurybia paludosa (Ait.) G.L.Nesom

Synonyms
- Aster paludosus Ait.; Heleastrum paludosum (Ait.) DC.; Diplopappus paludosus Lindl. ex DC.

= Eurybia paludosa =

Southern swamp aster

Species of flowering plant

Eurybia paludosa, commonly known as the southern swamp aster or Savannah grass-leaved aster, is an herbaceous perennial in the family Asteraceae. It is native to the southeastern United States where it is confined to the Carolinas and the states of Georgia and Florida. It is generally confined to moist soils, though it can occasionally be found on sand hills along the coastal plain. The southern swamp aster is often confused with the closely related southern prairie aster (Eurybia hemispherica), though they do not occur in the same habitats or geographical areas. Its flower heads emerge in the late summer through fall and show deep lavender to purple rays with yellow centres.

== Similar species ==
Eurybia paludosa is often confused with the closely related Eurybia hemispherica. Despite the fact that both of these asters are found in the southeastern United States, they do not occur in the same geographical regions nor the same habitats. For example, in North Carolina, where both plants are present E. paludosa occurs along the coastal plain, but E. hemispherica is confined to the mountains. Also, in the north of Florida, the southern swamp aster is found solely in Nassau County in the extreme northeast of the state, while the southern prairie aster is restricted to the western panhandle.

== Distribution and habitat ==
Eurybia paludosa is confined to the U.S. states of North Carolina, South Carolina, Georgia and Florida. In Florida it is only known in Nassau County in the extreme northeast of the state. It is found in wet soils in habitats that include the edges of swamps and pools, moist savannas and low-lying pinelands. It is also encountered with much less frequency in drier habitats including atop small sand dunes along coastal plains and in open hammocks. As a principally low-lying species it is only found at elevations from sea-level to 100 metres.
