= Edward Johnston Alexander =

American botanist (1901-1985)

- Born: July 31, 1901; Asheville, North Carolina, U.S.
- Died: August 18, 1985 (aged 84)
- Scientific career
- Fields: Botany
- Institutions: New York Botanical Garden
- Author abbrev. (botany): Alexander

Edward Johnston Alexander (July 31, 1901 – August 18, 1985) was an American botanist who discovered three species and one genus. He is the author or one of the authors of 205 entries in the International Plant Names Index. He was born in Asheville, North Carolina and studied at North Carolina State University from 1919 to 1923. He was a longtime assistant and curator at New York Botanical Garden (NYBG), originally under the guidance of Small. While at the NYBG, he served as an editor of the Garden's botanical journal Addisonia for about thirty years, until the journal ceased publication in 1964.

Alexander undertook several botanical expeditions in his lifetime, including to Pecos, Texas with John Kunkel Small and to the southern Appalachians and the Rocky Mountains with Thomas H. Everett. His most successful expedition was to southern Mexico from 1944 to 1945. On that trip, he collected around 1,600 specimens and 1,000 seeds and roots for the herbarium and propagation houses at the New York Botanical Garden.

Alexander never married. He died in 1985.

== Plant discoveries ==
- Epidendrum hartii
- Mucuna
- Mucuna urens
- Nopalxochia ackermannii candida

== Works ==
- The Flora of the Unicorn Tapestries
- Succulent Plants of New and Old World Deserts
- The New York Botanical Garden – Trees-Shrubs
- List of Seeds Distributed to Subscribers of the Southern Appalachian Expedition of the New York Botanical Garden 1933
- Compositae – Heliantheae – Coreopsidinae
- North American Flora. Series II: Part 2: Compositae. Heliantheae. Coreopsidinae
- Report of the Southern Appalachian Expedition
- Family Compositae, Tribe Heliantheae, Subtribe Coreopsidinae
