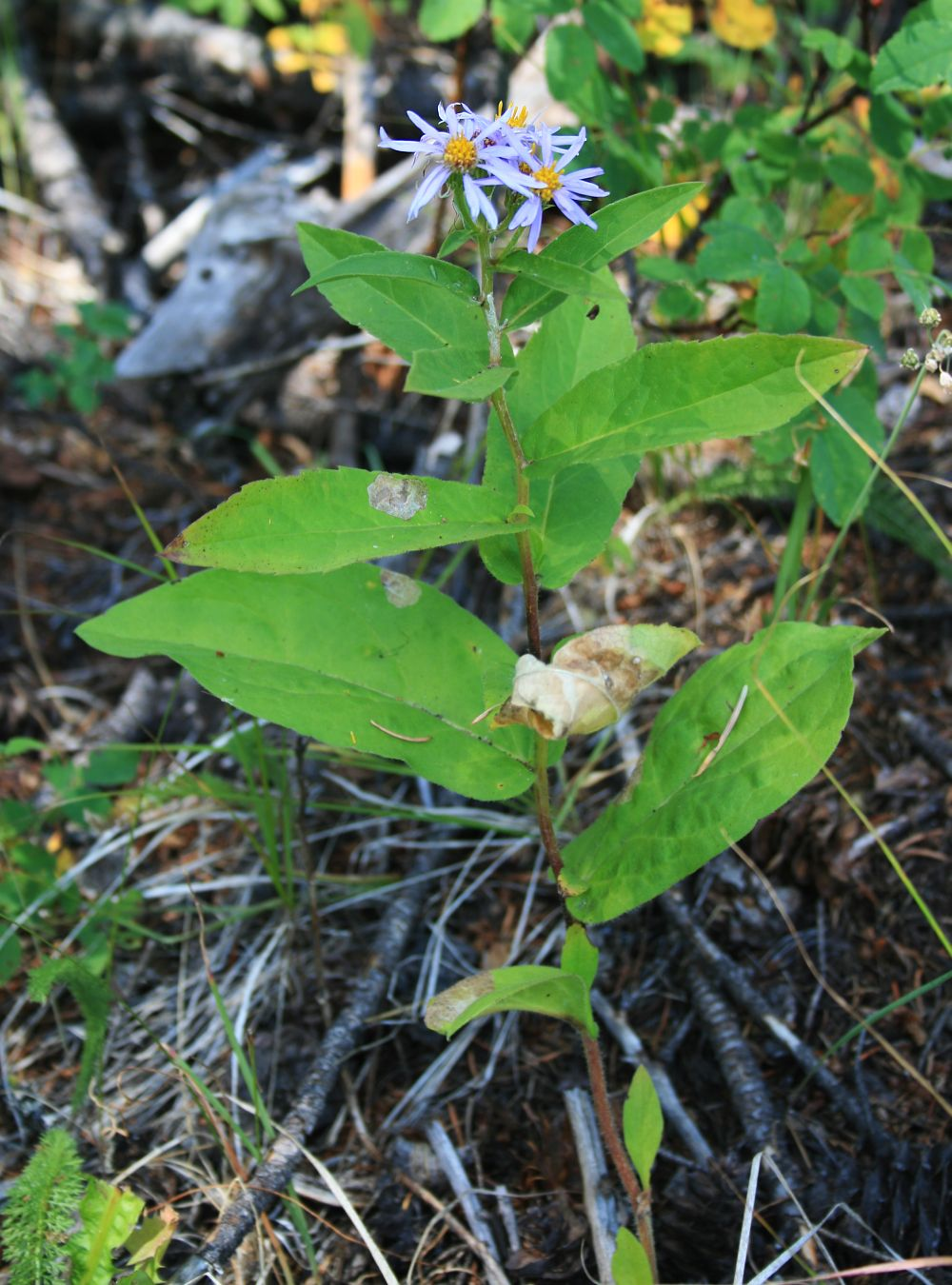
- Eurybia conspicua

Scientific classification
- Kingdom: Plantae
- Clade: Embryophytes
- Clade: Tracheophytes
- Clade: Angiosperms
- Clade: Eudicots
- Clade: Asterids
- Order: Asterales
- Family: Asteraceae
- Subfamily: Asteroideae
- Tribe: Astereae
- Subtribe: Machaerantherinae
- Genus: Eurybia (Cass.) S.F.Gray

Synonyms
- Aster subg. Eurybia Cass.

= Eurybia (plant) =

Genus of flowering plants

Eurybia is a genus of plants in the family Asteraceae that were previously included in the genus Aster. Most species are native to North America, although one is also present in northern Eurasia. There are 23 species in the genus, including 1 natural hybrid. The name was first applied by Alexandre de Cassini in 1820. The name is derived from Ancient Greek εὐρύς (eurús), meaning "wide", and βαιός (baiós), meaning "few", perhaps in reference to the small number of relatively wide ray florets.

== Description ==
All species within the genus are perennials that grow from 10 to 120 cm (4 to 47 in) in height. They have rhizomes which can either be long, slender or short and thick or sometimes cormoid, all of which often become woody. The stems can be ascending to erect and are typically simple, though they are in rare cases they branch proximally, i.e. near the point of attachment. They can be glabrous to more or less densely hairy, and are generally eglandular, meaning they lack glands, though they can sometimes be stipitate-glandular, meaning glands are present on a stipe.

The leaves are always alternate. Both basal and cauline leaves, i.e. leaves growing on the stem, are present, and these may be either sessile or petiolate, meaning lacking or having a leaf stalk. The blades of the leaves may be anything from cordate, ovate, obovate, elliptic, or oblong in shape to spatulate, oblanceolate, or lanceolate. They are usually gradually reduced distally, meaning they taper towards the apex. The leaf margins can be entire or serrate, i.e. toothed, though they may also occasionally be spinulose-serrate, that is being toothed with small spines. The leaf surfaces are glabrate to hairy and are usually eglandular, though they may sometimes be stipitate-glandular.

The capitula, or flower heads, are radiate and typically appear in corymbiform arrays, but in rare cases they may be borne singly. The involucres, the bracts at the base of the flower heads, are cylindro-campanulate, meaning bell-shaped, to broadly campanulate and measure from 4 to 14 and exceptionally to 16 mm long by 4 to more than 25 mm wide. The phyllaries, that is the individual bracts that make up the involucres, number from 20 up to 140 in 3 to 7 series and are single nerved. They are usually rounded adaxially, i.e. towards their upper-side, but are sometimes low-keeled. Their shape is unequal and broadly ovate or oblong to oblanceolate, lanceolate, or linear. The bases of the phyllaries are indurate, or hardened, and rarely wholly foliaceous, meaning leaf-like in appearance. Their margins are narrowly scarious, meaning membranous and dry, or occasionally herbaceous, and often ciliolate, i.e. having minute cilia. The apices, or terminal ends, are obtuse to acute, while the surfaces are glabrous (hairless), somewhat strigillose (with stiff, slender bristles), puberulent (very finely haired), scabrellous (having small rough hairs), strigoso-villous (with stiff soft hairs), or villous (having soft shaggy hairs), and occasionally they are more or less stipitate-glandular.

The receptacles, the stalks that attach to the florets, are flat to slightly convex, pitted and epaleate, i.e. lacking palea, dry scale-like bracts. The ray florets, the long petal-like appendages, number between 5 and 60 and are pistillate and fertile. Their corollas are white to purple in colour and coil at maturity. The disc florets, the tiny flowers at the center of the flower structure, number from 8 all the way up to 260 and are bisexual and fertile. Their corollas are yellow, though they become purple at maturity, and may be barely to abruptly ampliate, meaning enlarged. The corolla tubes are either shorter or longer than the throats, which are funnelform to campanulate. They have 5 lobes, which are usually erect to spreading or occasionally somewhat reflexed, and are deltate, triangular, or lanceolate.

The style-branch appendages are lanceolate in shape. The fruits are cypselae, which are cylindro-obconic (cylindrically reverse-conical) to fusiform (tapering at both ends) in shape, and are often somewhat compressed. They have 7 to 12 and exceptionally up 18 nerves with surfaces that are eglandular and glabrous or sparsely to densely strigillose. The pappi are persistent and are made up of 35 to 70 or more bristles that are reddish, orange, cinnamon, tawny, tan, yellowish, or pinkish in colour. The bristles are unequal, soft to stiff, barbellate (finely barbed) or barbellulate (barbed with diminutive barbs) and often apically somewhat clavate, or club shaped. They appear in 2 to 4 series.

Species

- Eurybia avita – Georgia, Carolinas
- Eurybia chlorolepis – southern Appalachians
- Eurybia compacta – east-central coastal plain
- Eurybia conspicua – central + western Canada, northwestern US + Black Hills
- Eurybia divaricata – eastern US, Quebec, Ontario
- Eurybia eryngiifolia – Florida, Georgia, Alabama
- Eurybia furcata – Great Lakes + Ozarks
- Eurybia hemispherica – southeastern + south-central US
- Eurybia × herveyi – New England, New York, New Jersey
- Eurybia integrifolia – western US
- Eurybia jonesiae – Georgia, Alabama
- Eurybia macrophylla – central Canada, eastern + north-central US
- Eurybia merita – western Canada, northwestern US + Black Hills
- Eurybia mirabilis – Carolinas
- Eurybia paludosa– Florida, Georgia, Carolinas
- Eurybia radula – eastern Canada, northeastern US
- Eurybia radulina – Pacific coast of US + Canada
- Eurybia saxicastelli – Tennessee, Kentucky
- Eurybia schreberi – Ontario, northeastern + north-central US
- Eurybia sibirica – northern + western Canada, northwestern US incl Alaska; northern Eurasia
- Eurybia spectabilis – eastern US
- Eurybia spinulosa – Florida Panhandle
- Eurybia surculosa – southern Appalachians, Cumberland Plateau
