= List of Aster synonyms =

The genus Aster (sunflower family - Asteraceae) is now generally restricted to the Old World species. The other species have now been reclassified as Afroaster, Almutaster, Canadanthus, Doellingeria, Eucephalus, Eurybia, Ionactis, Oligoneuron, Oreostemma, Sericocarpus and Symphyotrichum.

== Aster synonyms ==
- Aster abatus : Xylorhiza tortifolia
- Aster alpigenus ssp. alpigenus : Oreostemma alpigenum var. alpigenum
- Aster alpigenus ssp. andersonii : Oreostemma alpigenum var. andersonii
- Aster ananthocladus : Afroaster ananthocladus
- Aster adscendens : Symphyotrichum ascendens
- Aster bakerianus : Afroaster hispidus
- Aster bowiei : Afroaster bowiei
- Aster brachyactis : Symphyotrichum ciliatum
- Aster breweri : Eucephalus breweri
- Aster brickellioides var. brickellioides : Eucephalus brickellioides
- Aster brickellioides var. glabratus : Eucephalus glabratus
- Aster caerulescens : Symphyotrichum praealtum var. praealtum
- Aster campestris var. bloomeri : Symphyotrichum campestre var. bloomeri
- Aster campestris var. campestris : Symphyotrichum campestre var. campestre
- Aster chilensis var. chilensis : Symphyotrichum chilense var. chilense
- Aster chilensis var. invenustum : Symphyotrichum chilense var. invenustum
- Aster chimanimaniensis : Afroaster chimanimaniensis
- Aster ciliolatus : Symphyotrichum ciliolatum
- Aster comptonii : Afroaster comptonii
- Aster confertifolius : Afroaster confertifolius
- Aster cordifolius : Symphyotrichum cordifolium
- Aster dumosus L.: Symphyotrichum dumosum (L.) G. L. Nesom
- Aster eatonii : Symphyotrichum eatonii
- Aster elatus : Oreostemma elatum
- Aster engelmannii : Eucephalus engelmannii
- Aster ericoides : Symphyotrichum ericoides
- Aster erucifolius : Afroaster erucifolius
- Aster exilis : Symphyotrichum divaricatum
- Aster falcatus var. crassulus : Symphyotrichum falcatum var. crassulum
- Aster falcatus var. falcatus : Symphyotrichum falcatum var. falcatum
- Aster foliaceus var. apricus : Symphyotrichum foliaceum var. apricum
- Aster foliaceus var. foliaceus : Symphyotrichum foliaceum var. foliaceum
- Aster foliaceus var. lyallii : Symphyotrichum hendersonii
- Aster foliaceus var. parryi : Symphyotrichum foliaceum var. parryi
- Aster frondosus : Symphyotrichum frondosum
- Aster glaucodes : Eurybia glauca
- Aster greatae : Symphyotrichum greatae
- Aster harveyanus : Afroaster serrulatus
- Aster integrifolius : Eurybia integrifolia
- Aster intricatus : Machaerantha carnosa var. intricata
- Aster laevis var. geyeri : Symphyotrichum laeve var. geyeri
- Aster laevis var. laevis : Symphyotrichum laeve var. laeve
- Aster lateriflorus var. lateriflorus : Symphyotrichum lateriflorum var. lateriflorum
- Aster lateriflorus var. pendulus : Symphyotrichum lateriflorum var. horizontale
- Aster ledophyllus : Eucephalus ledophyllus var. ledophyllus
- Aster linariifolius : Ionactis linariifolius
- Aster lydenburgensis : Afroaster lydenburgensis
- Aster milanjiensis : Afroaster milanjiensis
- Aster modestus : Canadanthus modestus
- Aster novae-angliae : Symphyotrichum novae-angliae
- Aster nubimontis : Afroaster nubimontis
- Aster occidentalis var. intermedius : Symphyotrichum spathulatum var. intermedium
- Aster occidentalis var. occidentalis : Symphytorichum spathulatum var. spathulatum
- Aster oolentangiensis : Symphyotrichum oolentangiense var. oolentangiense
- Aster oregonensis ssp. californicus : Sericocarpus oregonensis var. californicus
- Aster oregonensis ssp. oregonensis : Sericocarpus oregonensis var. oregonensis
- Aster paludicola : Symphyotrichum spathulatum var. yosemitanum
- Aster paludosus : Eurybia paludosa
- Aster paniculatus : Symphyotrichum lanceolatum ssp. lanceolatum
- Aster pansus : Symphyotrichum ericoides var. pansum
- Aster patens : Symphyotrichum patens var. patens
- Aster pauciflorus : Almutaster pauciflorus
- Aster peglerae : Afroaster peglerae
- Aster perelegans : Eucephalus elegans
- Aster perfoliatus : Afroaster perfoliatus
- Aster pilosus : Symphyotrichum pilosum
- Aster pleiocephalus : Afroaster pleiocephalus
- Aster porteri : Symphyotrichum porteri
- Aster praealtus : Symphyotrichum praealtum var. praealtum
- Aster pseudobakerianus : Afroaster pseudobakerianus
- Aster ptarmicoides : Oligoneuron album
- Aster puniceus : Symphyotrichum puniceum
- Aster radulinus : Eurybia radulina
- Aster sagittifolius : Symphyotrichum cordifolium
- Aster scaber : Doellingeria scaber
- Aster scopulorum : Ionactis alpina
- Aster sericeus : Symphyotrichum sericeum
- Aster sibiricus : Eurybia sibirica
- Aster simplex : Symphyotrichum lanceolatum ssp. lanceolatum
- Aster siskiyouensis : Eucephalus glabratus
- Aster subspicatus var. grayi : Symphyotrichum subspicatum var. grayi
- Aster subspicatus var. subspicatus : Symphyotrichum subspicatum var. subspicatum
- Aster tansaniensis : Afroaster tansaniensis
- Aster umbellatus : Doellingeria umbellata var. umbellata
- Aster yukonensis : Symphyotrichum yukonense
- Aster zuluensis : Afroaster zuluensis
