= Aster rigidus =

Aster rigidus may refer to four different species of plants:

- Aster rigidus Soó, a synonym for Galatella sedifolia subsp. rigida (DC.) Greuter
- Aster rigidus Kuntze, a synonym for Solidago rigida subsp. rigida L.
- Aster rigidus Moench, a synonym for Pentanema salicinum (L.) D.Gut.Larr. et al.
- Aster rigidus L., a synonym for Ionactis linariifolia (L.) Greene
