= Eucephalus =

Eucephalus may refer to:

- Eucephalus (plant), a genus of aster-like flowering plants in the family Asteraceae.
- Leptotyphlops, a genus of blind snakes for which Eucephalus is a junior synonym.
