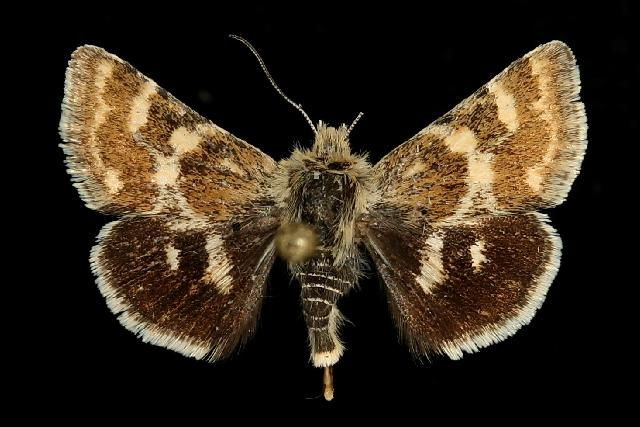

Scientific classification
- Domain: Eukaryota
- Kingdom: Animalia
- Phylum: Arthropoda
- Class: Insecta
- Order: Lepidoptera
- Superfamily: Noctuoidea
- Family: Noctuidae
- Genus: Schinia
- Species: S. intermontana

Binomial name
- Schinia intermontana Hardwick, 1958

= Schinia intermontana =

Species of moth

Schinia intermontana is a moth of the family Noctuidae. It is found from British Columbia south to Montana, Washington and Colorado.

It was formerly considered a subspecies of Schinia villosa.

The larvae feed on Erigeron species.
