= Ionactis elegans =

Scientific classification
- Kingdom: Plantae
- Clade: Tracheophytes
- Clade: Angiosperms
- Clade: Eudicots
- Clade: Asterids
- Order: Asterales
- Family: Asteraceae
- Genus: Ionactis
- Species: I. elegans

Binomial name
- Ionactis elegans (Soreng & Spellenb.) G.L.Nesom 1992

Synonyms
- Chaetopappa elegans Soreng & Spellenb. 1984

Species of flowering plant

Ionactis elegans, the Sierra Blanca least-daisy, is a rare North American species in the family Asteraceae. It has been found only in New Mexico in the western United States.

== Description ==
Ionactis elegans is a small perennial rarely more than 9 cm (3.5 in) tall, with a taproot. The plant usually produces 1-3 flower heads, each with 10-24 white or pale lavender ray flowers surrounding yellow disc flowers.
