= Eucephalus glaucescens =

Scientific classification
- Kingdom: Plantae
- Clade: Tracheophytes
- Clade: Angiosperms
- Clade: Eudicots
- Clade: Asterids
- Order: Asterales
- Family: Asteraceae
- Genus: Eucephalus
- Species: E. glaucescens

Binomial name
- Eucephalus glaucescens (A. Gray) Greene 1896

Synonyms
- Aster engelmannii var. glaucescens A. Gray 1884; Aster glaucescens (A. Gray) S.F. Blake; Aster glaucophyllus (Piper) Frye & Rigg; Aster serrulatus (Greene) Frye & Rigg 1912 not Harv.1865; Eucephalus glaucophyllus Piper; Eucephalus macounii Greene; Eucephalus serrulatus Greene

Species of flowering plant

Eucephalus glaucescens is a North American species of flowering plant in the family Asteraceae known by the common name Klickitat aster. It grows on rocky slopes and in subalpine meadows at high elevations on and near Mount Adams in the south-central part of the US State of Washington.

Eucephalus glaucescens is a perennial herb up to 160 cm (5 1/3 ft) tall, with a woody caudex. Stems are hairless. Leaves are whitish and waxy. One plant will usually produce 5-60 flower heads in a large array. Each head has 8-13 purple ray florets surrounding numerous yellow disc florets.
