= Eucephalus gormanii =

Scientific classification
- Kingdom: Plantae
- Clade: Tracheophytes
- Clade: Angiosperms
- Clade: Eudicots
- Clade: Asterids
- Order: Asterales
- Family: Asteraceae
- Genus: Eucephalus
- Species: E. gormanii

Binomial name
- Eucephalus gormanii Piper

Synonyms
- Aster gormanii (Piper) S.F.Blake

Species of flowering plant

Eucephalus gormanii is a North American species of flowering plant in the family Asteraceae known by the common name Gorman’s aster. It grows on rocky slopes and on cliffs at high elevations in the Cascade Mountains of the US State of Oregon.

Eucephalus gormanii is a perennial herb up to 40 cm (16 inches) tall, with short rhizomes and a woody caudex. Stems are hairless. One plant will usually produce 2-5 flower heads per stem. Each head has 5-13 white ray florets surrounding numerous yellow disc florets.
