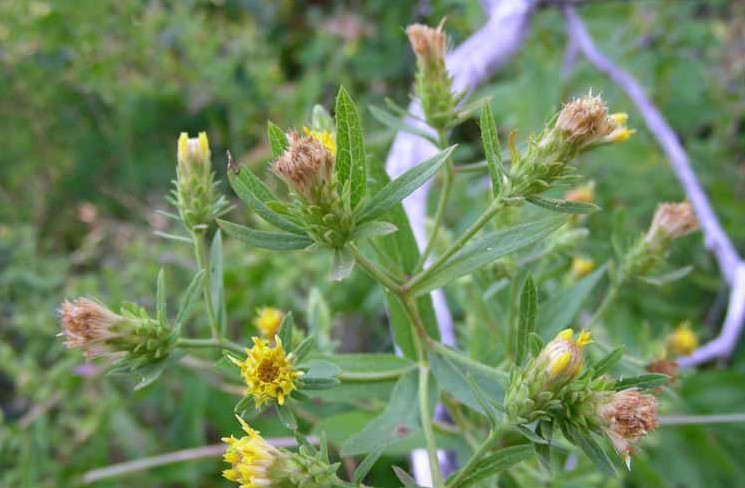

Conservation status
- Vulnerable (NatureServe)

Scientific classification
- Kingdom: Plantae
- Clade: Embryophytes
- Clade: Tracheophytes
- Clade: Angiosperms
- Clade: Eudicots
- Clade: Asterids
- Order: Asterales
- Family: Asteraceae
- Genus: Eucephalus
- Species: E. vialis

Binomial name
- Eucephalus vialis Bradshaw

Synonyms
- Aster vialis (Bradshaw) S.F.Blake

= Eucephalus vialis =

Species of flowering plant

Eucephalus vialis is a rare North American species of flowering plant in the family Asteraceae known by the common name wayside aster. It is native to southwestern Oregon and northwestern California in the United States.

Eucephalus vialis is a perennial herb producing hairy, erect stems up to 1.2 meters (4 feet) tall from a thick caudex. It spreads by means of rhizomes. The middle and upper leaves are widely lance-shaped and measure up to 9 centimeters (3.6 inches) long by 3 cm (1.2 inches) wide. The lower leaves are smaller and scale-like. They are coated with glandular hairs. They are dull green and sometimes toothed. The inflorescence is a small or very large array of flower heads. Each is about a centimeter (0.4 inches) long and has layers of narrow phyllaries. Each head contains several yellow disc florets but no ray florets. However, some plants may have vestigial rays. Flowering occurs in July through September. While the plants sometimes reproduce sexually via seed, the populations often grow via vegetative reproduction. The species is self-incompatible and cannot reproduce via self-fertilization. It is an obligate outcrosser and must breed with other individuals, exchanging pollen. It is pollinated by Bombus vosnesenskii (a bumblebee), Lasioglossum sp. (a sweat bee), Epicanta puncticollis (a blister beetle), and Ochlodes sylvanoides (a skipper).

Eucephalus vialis occurs in Douglas, Jackson, Josephine, Lane, and Linn Counties in Oregon and Del Norte and Humboldt Counties in California. Several of these occurrences are relatively recent discoveries and the plant was once considered to be an endemic of the Willamette Valley. It grows mainly on dry sites in temperate coniferous forest habitat. The forest is dominated by Pseudotsuga menziesii (Douglas-fir), Arbutus menziesii (Pacific madrone), Chrysolepis chrysophylla (golden chinquapin), and Quercus garryana (Oregon white oak). Populations occur in many types of habitat, in all stages of ecological succession, from recently disturbed sites to mature climax communities. The plants do better in sunny location, and are less vigorous in shady habitat; as canopy cover increases, the plants are less common and those that do occur produce fewer flowers. Most of the plants are found in thin forests, openings in the forest, gaps on the forest edges. The plant can sometimes be found on serpentine substrates.

Threats to this species include habitat fragmentation. This is a problem because it separates and isolates populations of the plant, preventing gene flow. When members of the population can only interbreed within that population, inbreeding depression can result. Fire suppression is also a threat, because when the natural fire regime is prevented, the canopy becomes thicker and shades out the plants. Fire also removes the organic layer on the forest floor, which is good for plant because it germinates more easily on bare soil. The species can often be found in areas recently opened up by clear-cutting operations, a form of disturbance that has replaced wildfire since presettlement times in the region. This is not a replacement for natural forms of disturbance, because it leads to more rapid regrowth of the canopy. Logging also causes soil disturbance. Other threats include noxious weeds such as Rubus discolor (Himalayan blackberry), Rubus laciniatus (evergreen blackberry), and Cytisus scoparius (Scot's broom), which compete with the aster. Weed control is a key action in the preservation of the species. Some plants are affected by seed predation, the browsing of deer, and disruptions in pollinator populations. Livestock grazing is a problem in some locations, causing direct damage to the plants and indirect damage via habitat degradation. Roadside maintenance and road use for recreation may be problems to nearby populations. The Bureau of Land Management, United States Forest Service, and United States Fish and Wildlife Service are cooperating to conserve the species.

A study has found that experimental thinning of the forest improved the condition of the species by allowing more light to penetrate to the plants, reducing plant mortality, reducing herbivory by deer, and increasing the cover of native plants in the area.
