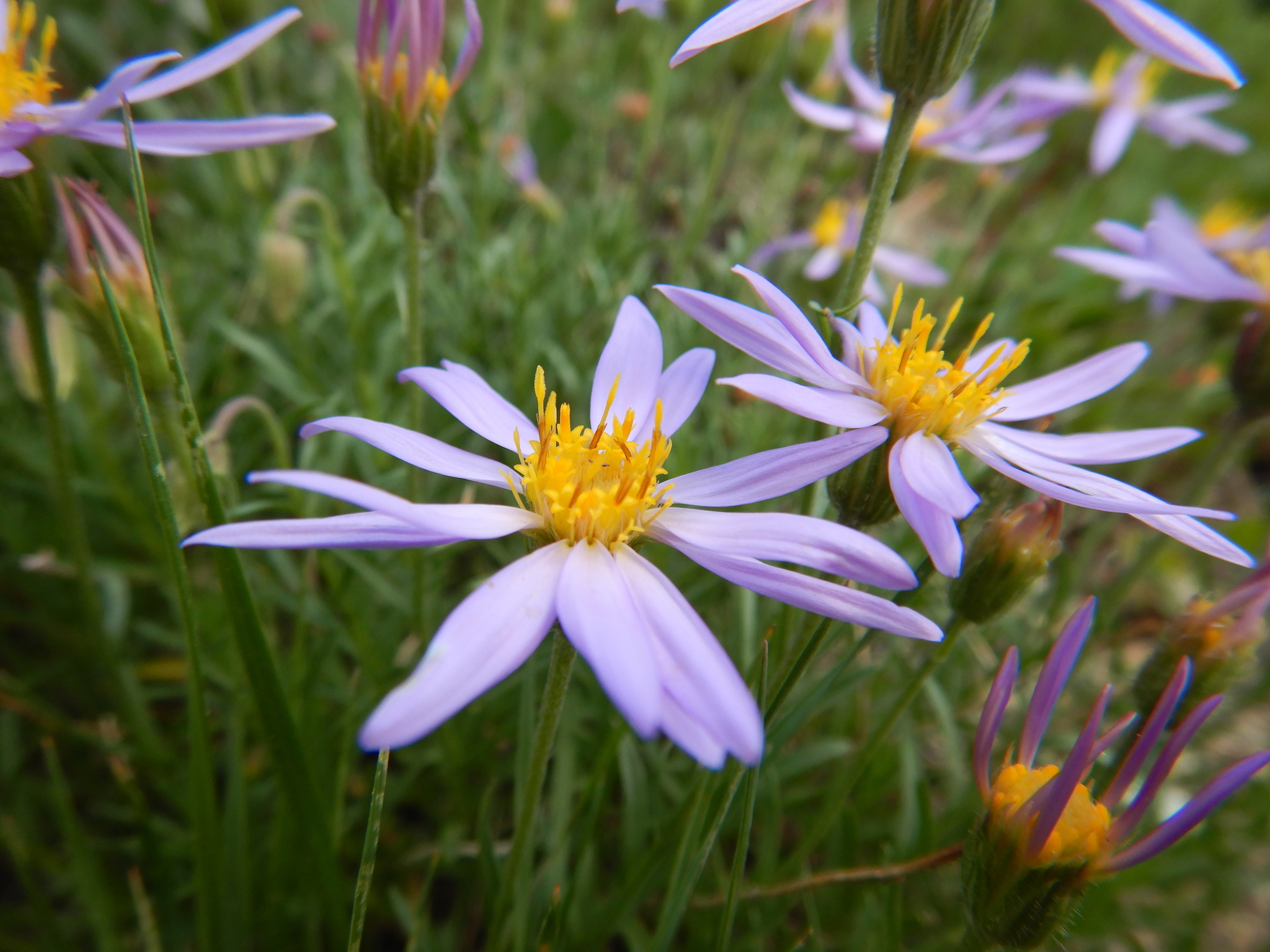

Scientific classification
- Kingdom: Plantae
- Clade: Tracheophytes
- Clade: Angiosperms
- Clade: Eudicots
- Clade: Asterids
- Order: Asterales
- Family: Asteraceae
- Genus: Ionactis
- Species: I. stenomeres

Binomial name
- Ionactis stenomeres (A.Gray) Greene 1897

Synonyms
- Aster stenomeres A. Gray 1882

= Ionactis stenomeres =

Species of flowering plant

Ionactis stenomeres, the Rocky Mountain aster, is a rare North American species in the family Asteraceae. It occurs in the Province of British Columbia in western Canada and also in the northwestern United States (Washington, Idaho, Montana).

== Description ==
Ionactis stenomeres is a small perennial up to 30 cm (12 in) tall, with a woody underground caudex. The plant usually produces only one flower head, each with 7-21 blue or lavender ray flowers surrounding yellow disc flowers.
