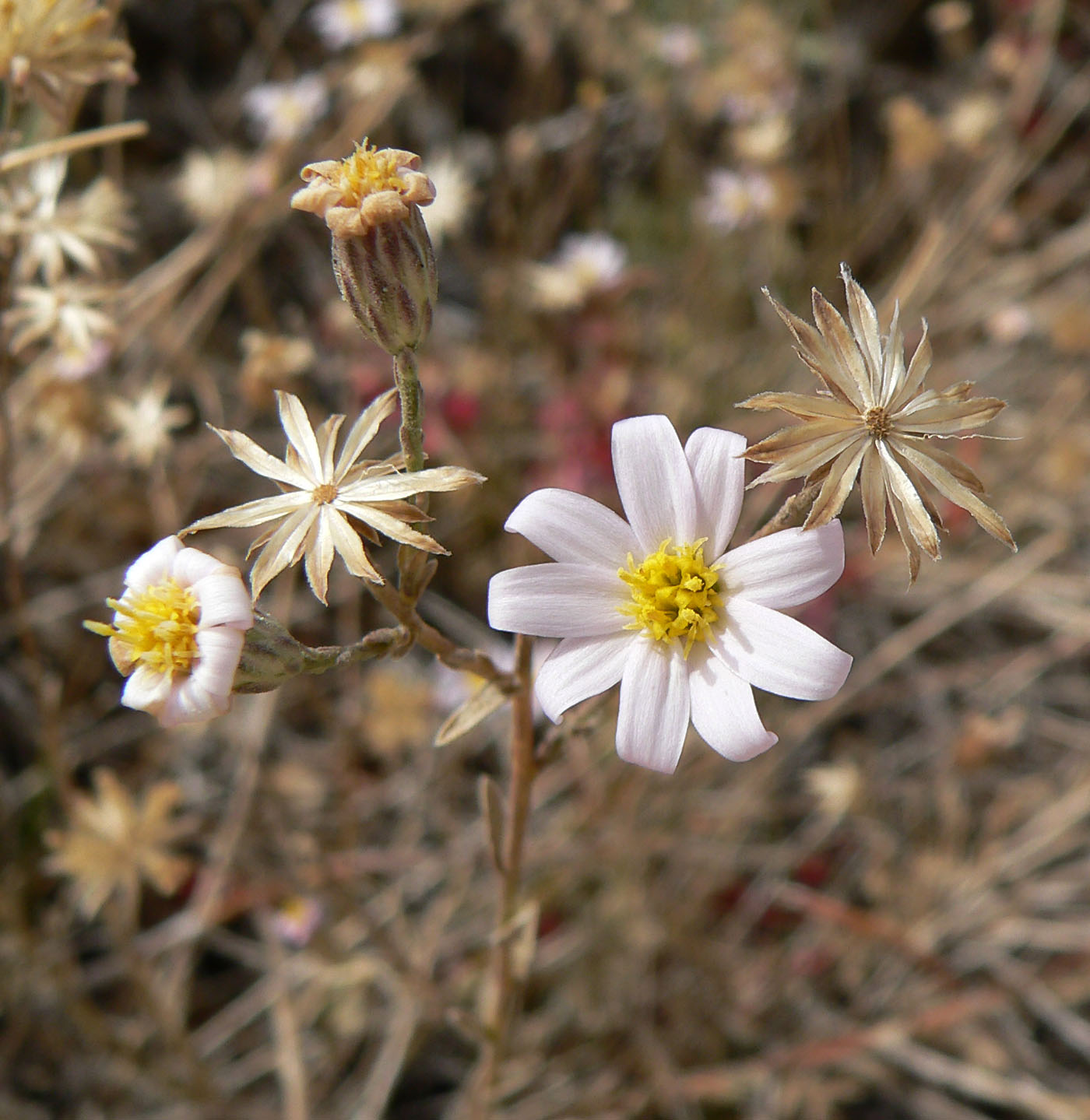

Conservation status
- Critically Imperiled (NatureServe)

Scientific classification
- Kingdom: Plantae
- Clade: Tracheophytes
- Clade: Angiosperms
- Clade: Eudicots
- Clade: Asterids
- Order: Asterales
- Family: Asteraceae
- Genus: Ionactis
- Species: I. caelestis

Binomial name
- Ionactis caelestis P.J.Leary & G.L.Nesom 1992

= Ionactis caelestis =

Species of flowering plant

Ionactis caelestis, the Spring Mountain aster, is a rare North American species in the family Asteraceae. It has been found only in southern Nevada in the western United States.

== Description ==
Ionactis caelestis is a small perennial shrub up to 25 cm (9.8 in) tall, with a thick woody taproot. The plant usually produces several flower heads in a flat-topped array.
