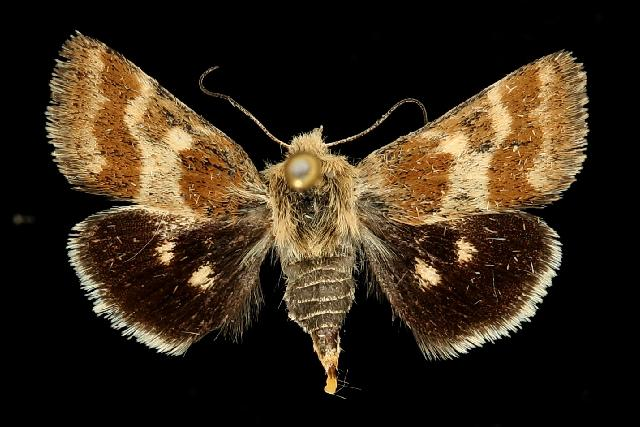

Scientific classification
- Kingdom: Animalia
- Phylum: Arthropoda
- Class: Insecta
- Order: Lepidoptera
- Superfamily: Noctuoidea
- Family: Noctuidae
- Genus: Schinia
- Species: S. villosa

Binomial name
- Schinia villosa Grote, 1864

= Schinia villosa =

Species of moth

Schinia villosa, the little dark gem, is a moth of the family Noctuidae. The species was first described by Augustus Radcliffe Grote in 1864. In North America, it is mostly a western mountain species, however it has also been found across the plains eastward across Alberta and Saskatchewan to southern Manitoba. To the west it is found up to the coast ranges of Washington and British Columbia, south to Arizona.

The wingspan is about 20 mm. Adults are on wing from July to August depending on the location.

The larvae feed on Aster, Erigeron and Eucephalus ledophyllus.
