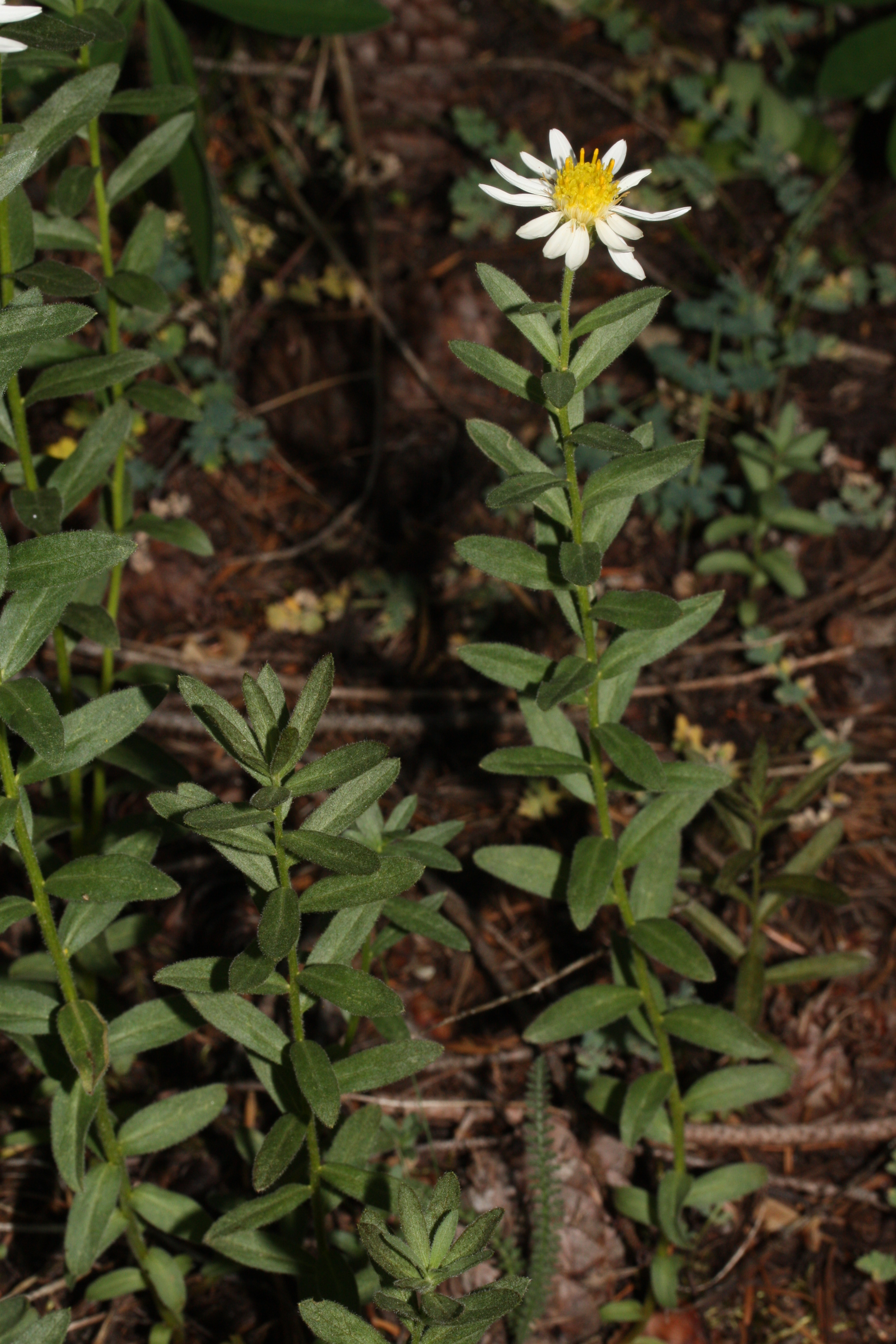

Scientific classification
- Kingdom: Plantae
- Clade: Tracheophytes
- Clade: Angiosperms
- Clade: Eudicots
- Clade: Asterids
- Order: Asterales
- Family: Asteraceae
- Genus: Eucephalus
- Species: E. paucicapitatus

Binomial name
- Eucephalus paucicapitatus (B.L.Rob.) Greene 1896

Synonyms
- Aster engelmannii var. paucicapitatus B.L. Rob. 1891; Aster paucicapitatus (B.L. Rob.) B.L. Rob.

= Eucephalus paucicapitatus =

Species of flowering plant

Eucephalus paucicapitatus is a North American species of flowering plant in the family Asteraceae known by the common name Olympic Mountain aster. It grows on rocky slopes and in subalpine meadows at high elevations in and near Olympic National Park in the US State of Washington, and on Vancouver Island in the Canadian Province of British Columbia.

Eucephalus paucicapitatus is a perennial herb up to 55 cm (22 inches) tall, with a woody caudex. One plant will usually produce 2-4 flower heads per stem. Each head has 7-21 white ray florets surrounding numerous yellow disc florets. Flowers bloom July to August.
