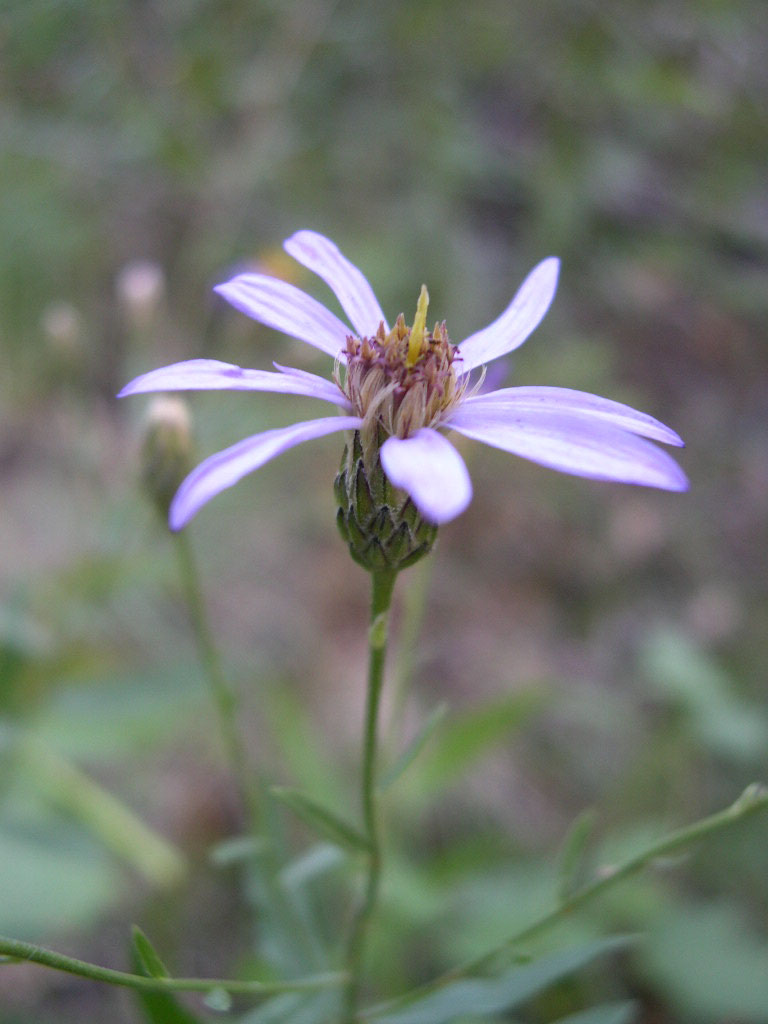

Scientific classification
- Kingdom: Plantae
- Clade: Tracheophytes
- Clade: Angiosperms
- Clade: Eudicots
- Clade: Asterids
- Order: Asterales
- Family: Asteraceae
- Genus: Eucephalus
- Species: E. elegans

Binomial name
- Eucephalus elegans Nutt. 1940

Synonyms
- Aster perelegans A. Nelson & J.F. Macbr.; Aster elegans (Nutt.) Torr. & A. Gray 1841, not Willd. 1803; Eucephalus frigidus Gand.; Eucephalus perelegans (A.Nelson & J.F.Macbr.) W.A.Weber; Eucephalus scaber Gand.

= Eucephalus elegans =

Species of flowering plant

Eucephalus elegans is a North American species of flowering plants in the family Asteraceae known by the common name elegant aster. It is native to the western United States, largely the Great Basin, in the states of Colorado, Idaho, Montana, Nevada, Oregon, Utah, Wyoming.

Eucephalus elegans is a perennial herb up to 70 cm (28 inches) tall, with a woody caudex. One plant will usually produce 3-15 flower heads in a showy array. Each head has 5–8 purple ray florets surrounding numerous yellow disc florets.
