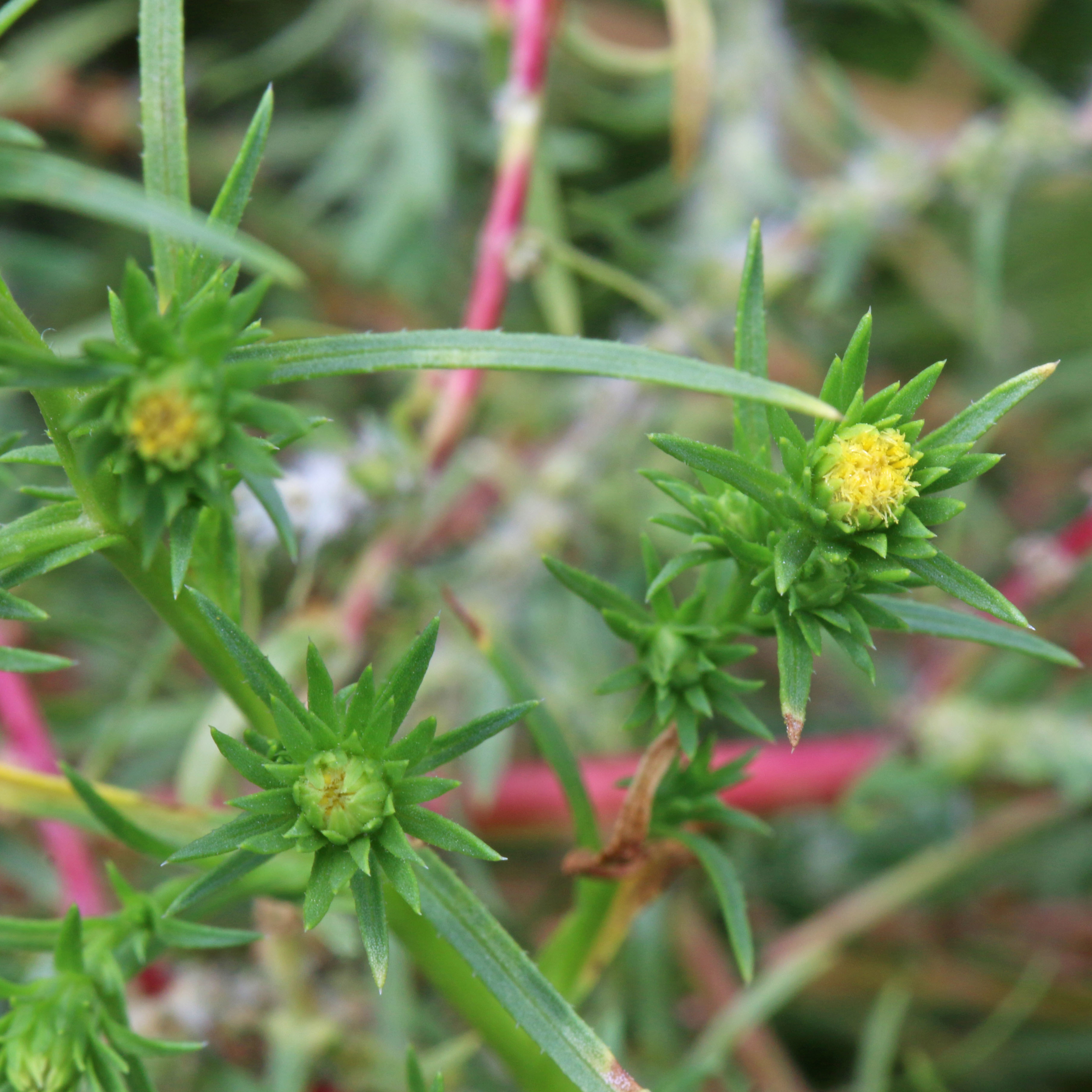

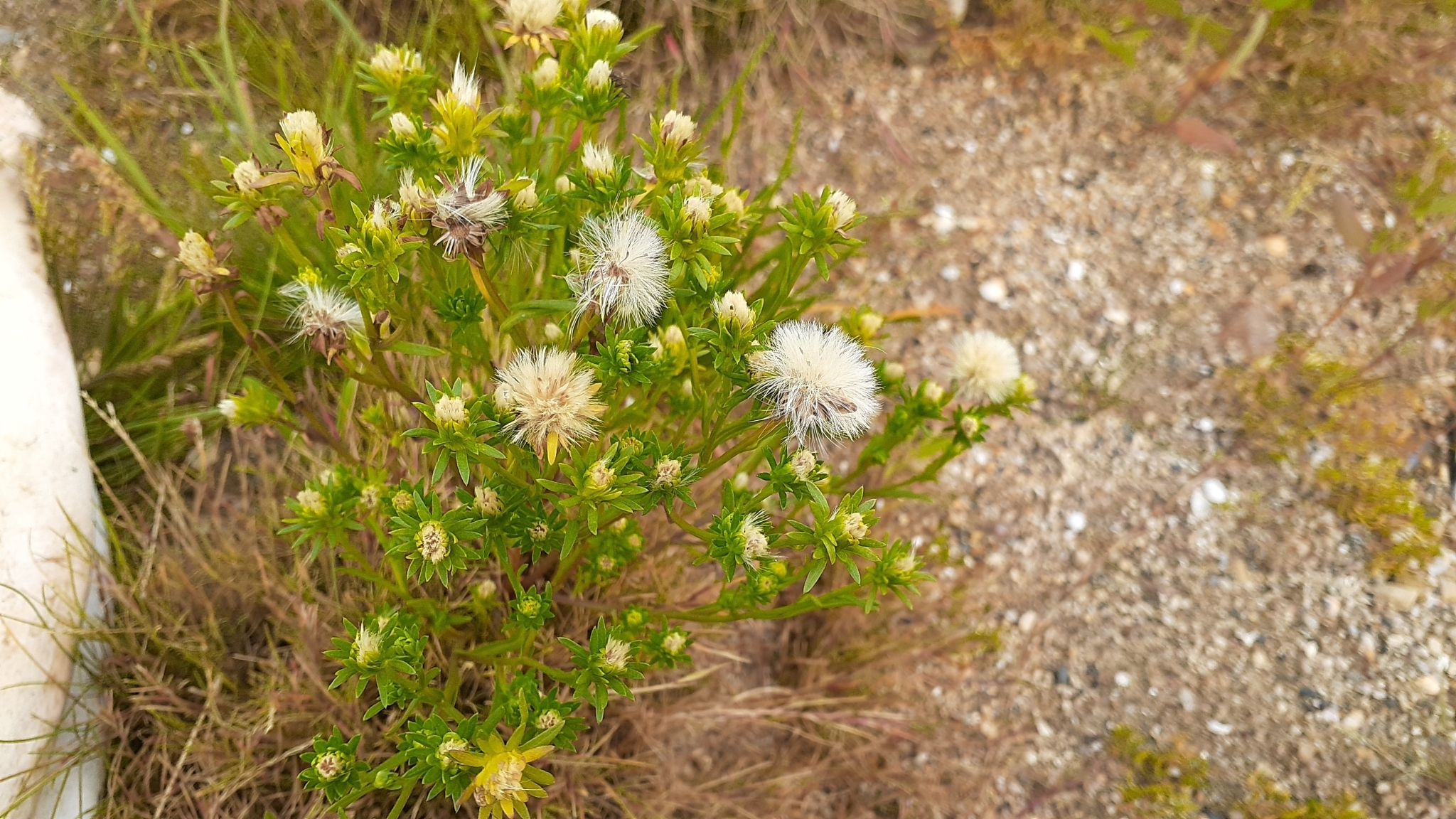

Conservation status
- Secure (NatureServe)

Scientific classification
- Kingdom: Plantae
- Clade: Tracheophytes
- Clade: Angiosperms
- Clade: Eudicots
- Clade: Asterids
- Order: Asterales
- Family: Asteraceae
- Tribe: Astereae
- Subtribe: Symphyotrichinae
- Genus: Symphyotrichum
- Subgenus: Symphyotrichum subg. Symphyotrichum
- Section: Symphyotrichum sect. Conyzopsis
- Species: S. ciliatum

Binomial name
- Symphyotrichum ciliatum (Ledeb.) G.L.Nesom
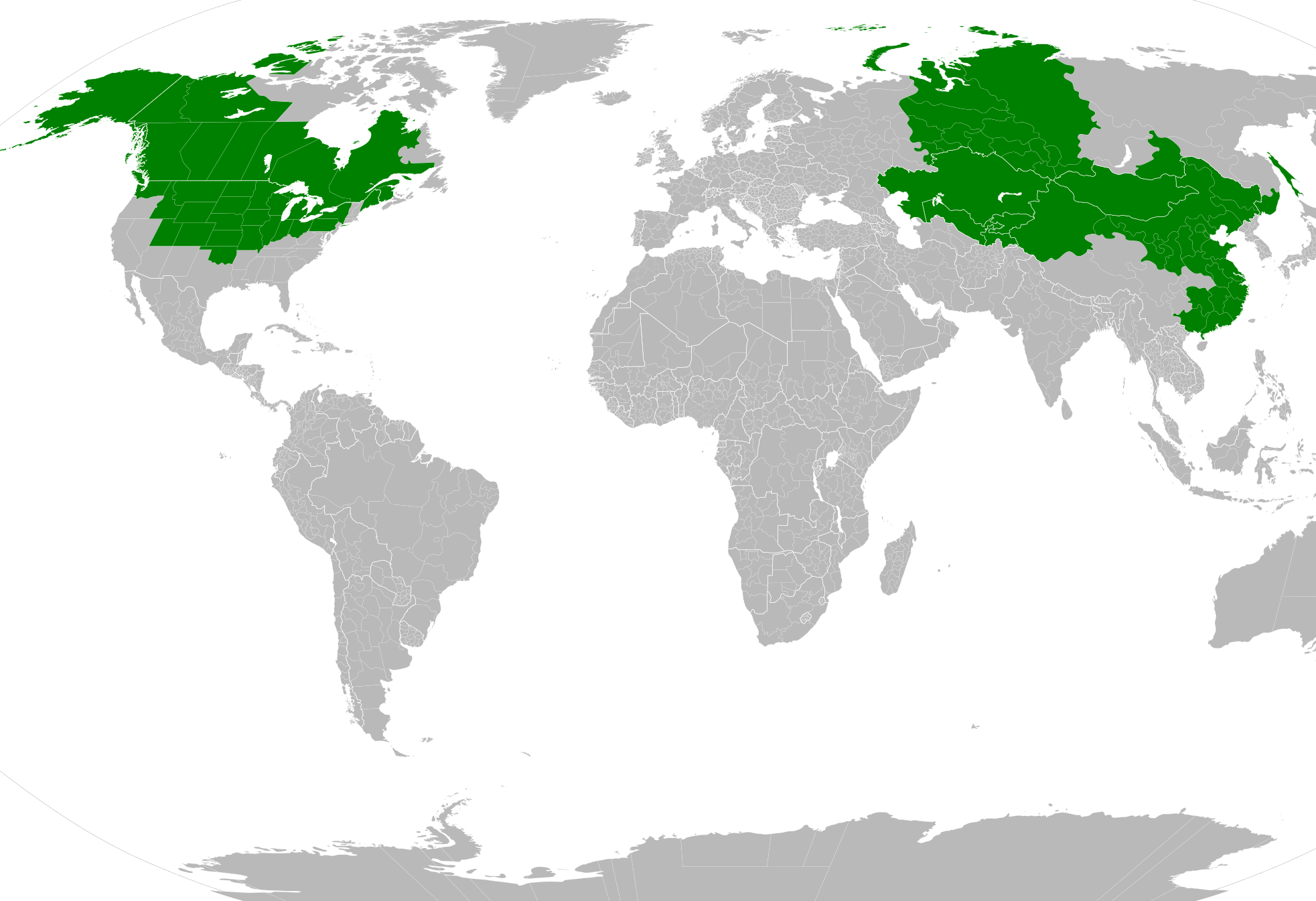
- Native distribution

Synonyms
- Basionym: Erigeron ciliatus Ledeb.; Alphabetical list: Aster alpinus var. brachyglossus Onno; Aster angustus Torr. & A.Gray; Aster brachyactis S.F.Blake; Aster ciliatus (Ledeb.) B.Fedtsch.; Aster ciliatus subsp. angustus (Lindl.) Govaerts; Aster fallax var. brachyglossus (Onno) Peschkova; Aster latisquamatus (Maxim.) Hand.-Mazz.; Bindera ciliata Raf.; Brachyactis altaica (DC.) Kitam.; Brachyactis angusta (Lindl.) Britton; Brachyactis ciliata (Ledeb.) Ledeb.; Brachyactis ciliata subsp. angusta (Lindl.) A.G.Jones; Brachyactis latisquamata (Maxim.) Kitag.; Chrysocoma humilis DC.; Conyza altaica DC.; Erigeron latisquamatus Maxim.; Linosyris humilis Torr. & A.Gray; Tripolium angustum Lindl.; Xalkitis ciliata Raf.

= Symphyotrichum ciliatum =

Species of plant in the aster family

Symphyotrichum ciliatum is a species of flowering plant in the family Asteraceae native to North America and eastern Eurasia. Commonly known as rayless annual aster and rayless alkali aster, it is an annual, herbaceous plant that may reach over 70 centimeters (2 feet 4 inches) in height. Each flower head has many whitish then pink disk florets and no ray florets ("rayless").

== Conservation ==
As of October 2022, NatureServe listed S. ciliatum as Secure (G5) globally; Secure (S5) in Nebraska; Apparently Secure (S4) in Alberta, British Columbia, Manitoba, Northwest Territories, Saskatchewan, and Montana; Vulnerable (S3) in Nunavut and Ontario; Imperiled (S2) in Wyoming; Critically Imperiled (S1) in Yukon; and, Possibly Extirpated (SH) in Kansas, Missouri, and Oklahoma. Its global status was last reviewed on 13 May 2016.

== Gallery ==
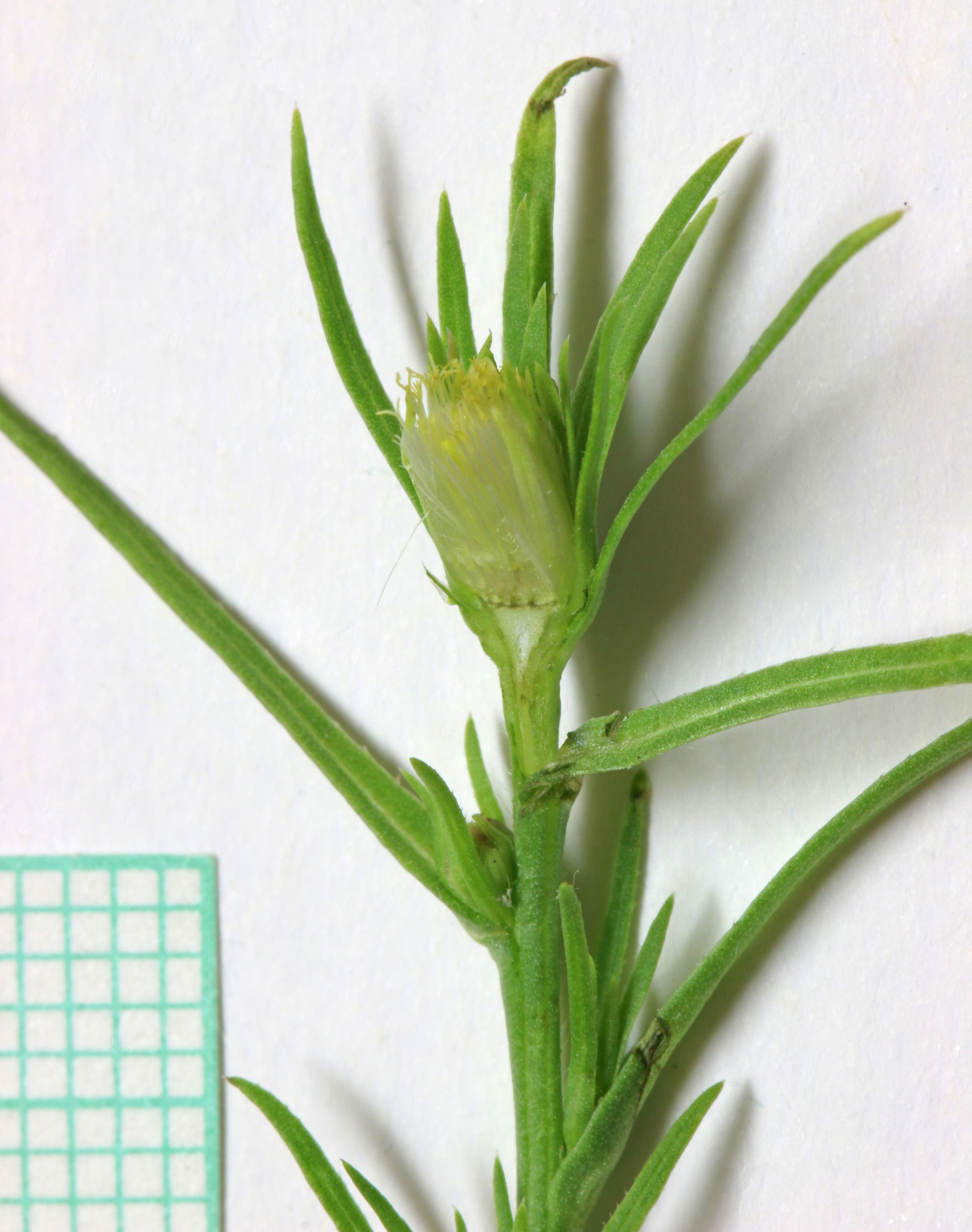

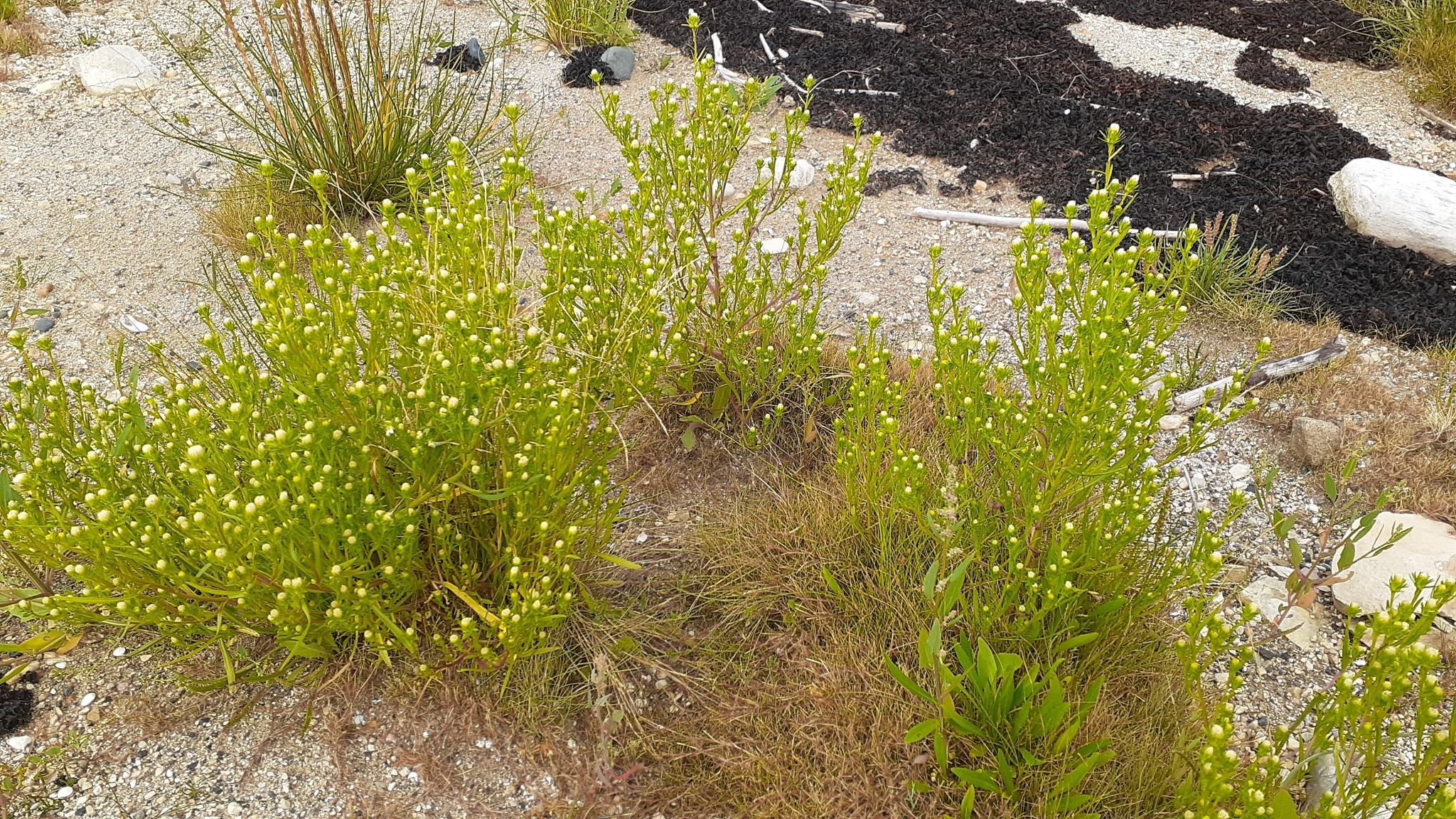

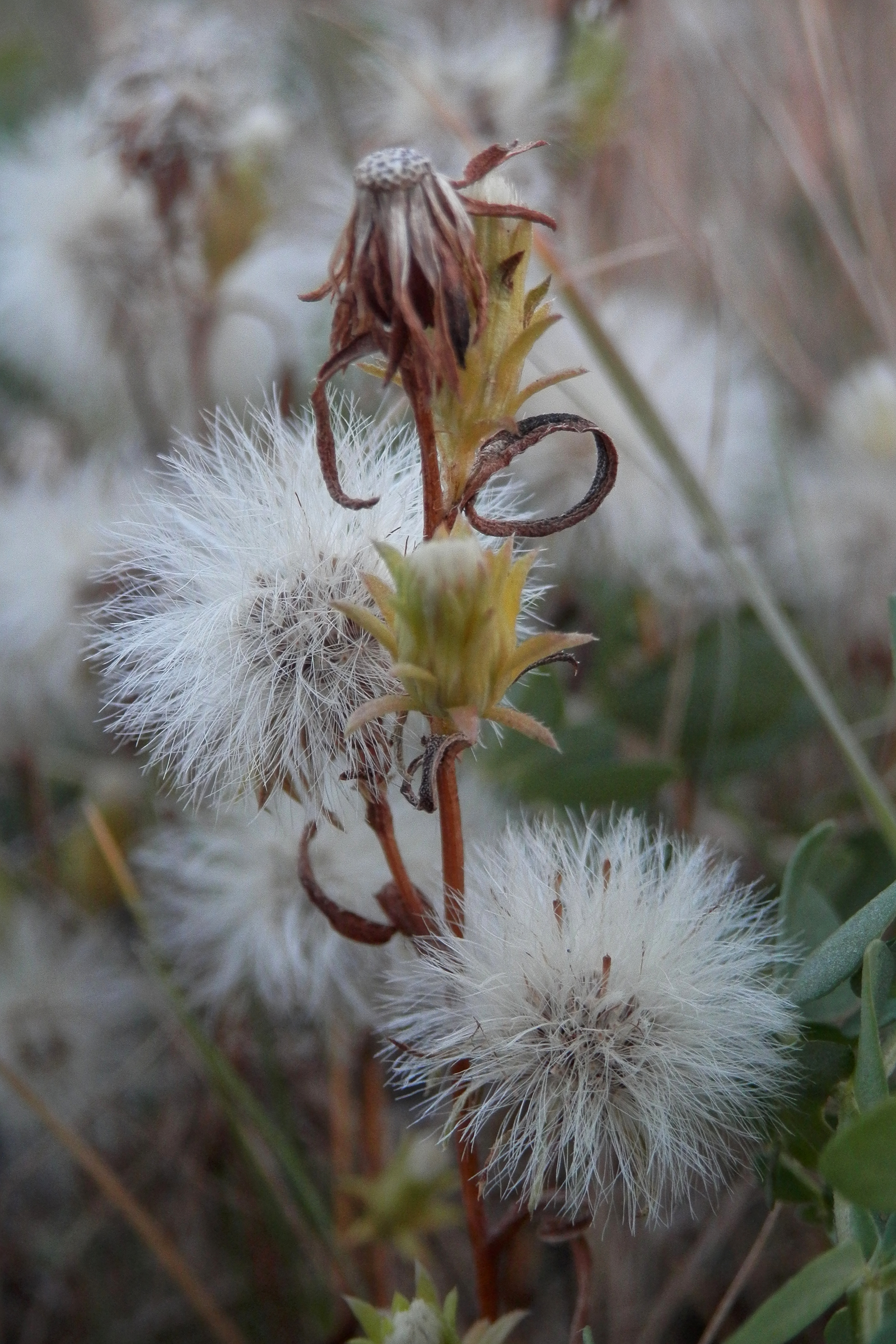
