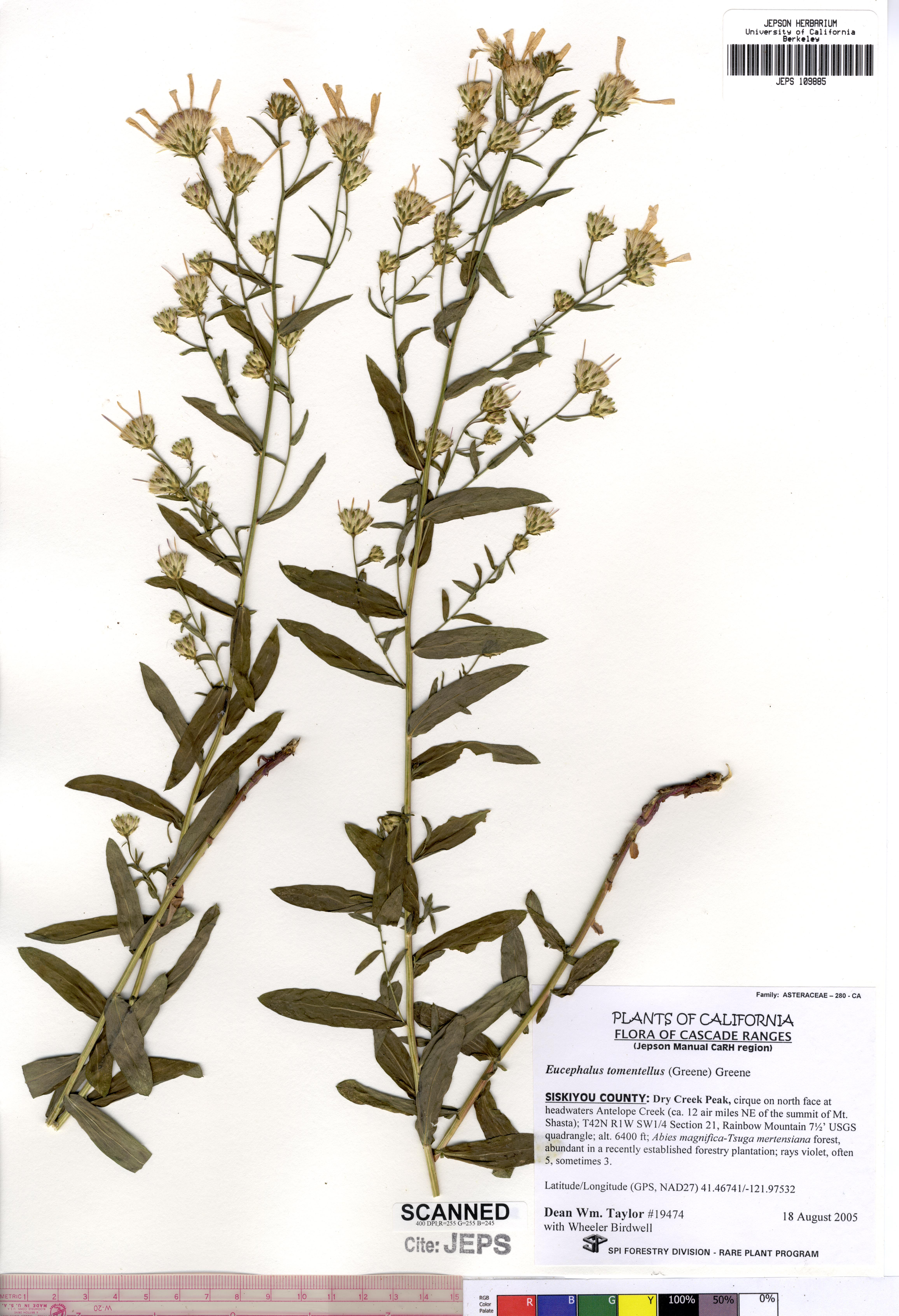
- Specimen from California, 2005

Scientific classification
- Kingdom: Plantae
- Clade: Tracheophytes
- Clade: Angiosperms
- Clade: Eudicots
- Clade: Asterids
- Order: Asterales
- Family: Asteraceae
- Genus: Eucephalus
- Species: E. tomentellus

Binomial name
- Eucephalus tomentellus (Greene) Greene 1896

Synonyms
- Sericocarpus tomentellus Greene 1889; Aster tomentellus (Greene) Frye & Rigg 1912 not Hook. & Arn. 1833; Eucephalus bicolor Eastw.; Eucephalus brickellioides (Greene) G.L.Nesom

= Eucephalus tomentellus =

Species of flowering plant

Eucephalus tomentellus is a North American species of flowering plant in the family Asteraceae known by the common name Brickellbush aster or rayless aster. It grows on openings in oak or conifer forests the Siskiyou Mountains of the US States of California and Oregon.

Eucephalus tomentellus is a perennial herb up to 90 cm (3 feet) tall, with a woody caudex. Stems are covered with woolly or cottony hair. Leaves are whitish and waxy. One plant will usually produce 3-40 flower heads in a large array. Each head has 0-6 purple-violet ray florets surrounding numerous yellow disc florets.
