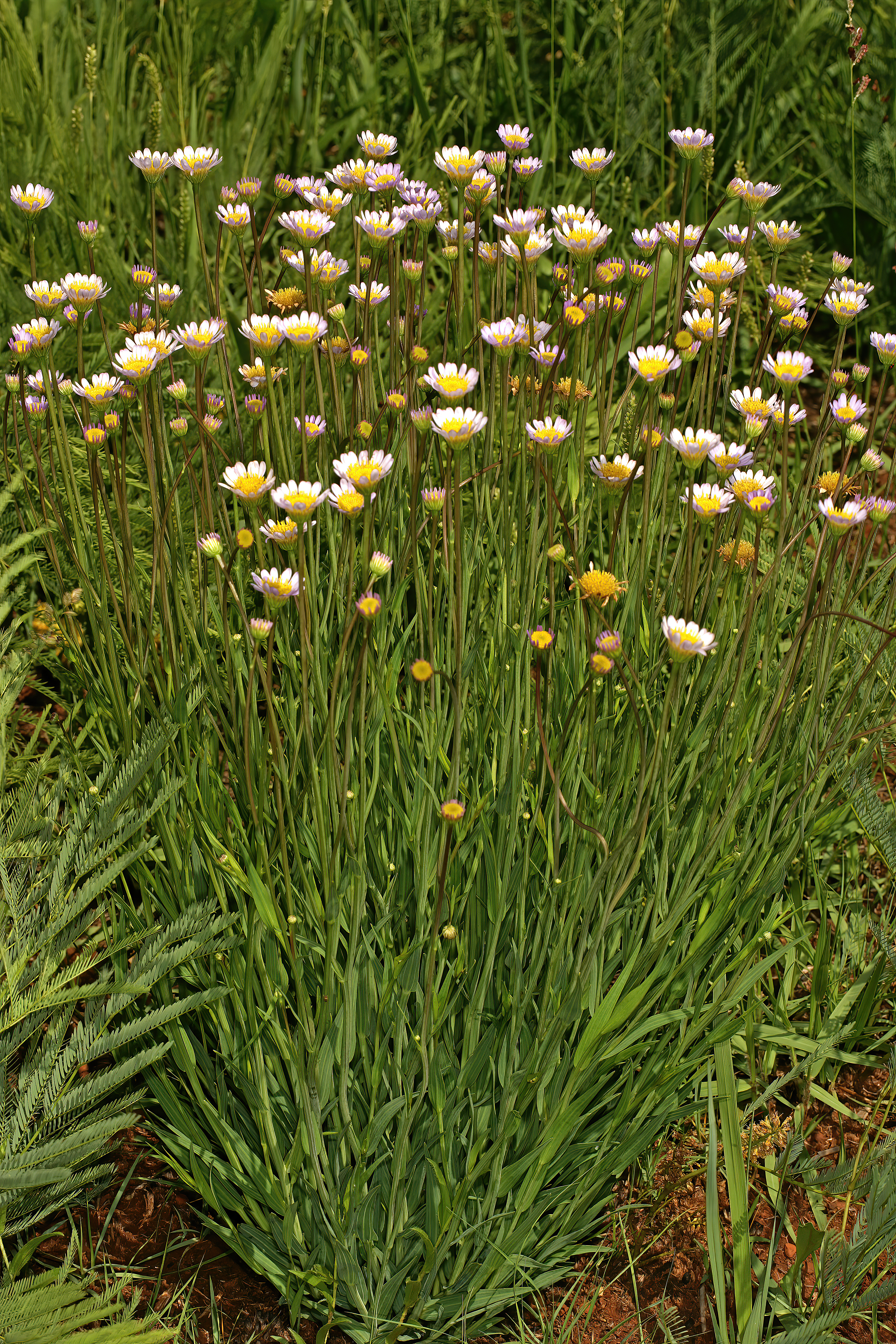

Scientific classification
- Kingdom: Plantae
- Clade: Tracheophytes
- Clade: Angiosperms
- Clade: Eudicots
- Clade: Asterids
- Order: Asterales
- Family: Asteraceae
- Genus: Afroaster
- Species: A. serrulatus

Binomial name
- Afroaster serrulatus (Harv.) J.C.Manning & Goldblatt

Synonyms
- Aster harveyanus Kuntze (1891); Aster harveyanus subsp. corymbosus W.Lippert (1973); Aster harveyanus subsp. gracilis W.Lippert (1973); Aster harveyanus subsp. nyikensis W.Lippert (1973); Aster harveyanus subsp. robustus W.Lippert (1973); Aster harveyanus subsp. xylophyllus (Klatt) W.Lippert (1973); Aster xylophyllus Klatt (1896); Diplopappus serrulatus Harv. (1865)

= Afroaster serrulatus =

Species of flowering plant

Afroaster serrulatus is a species of plant in the family Asteraceae native to South Africa, Mozambique, Zambia, Zimbabwe, Malawi, and Eswatini in southern Africa.
