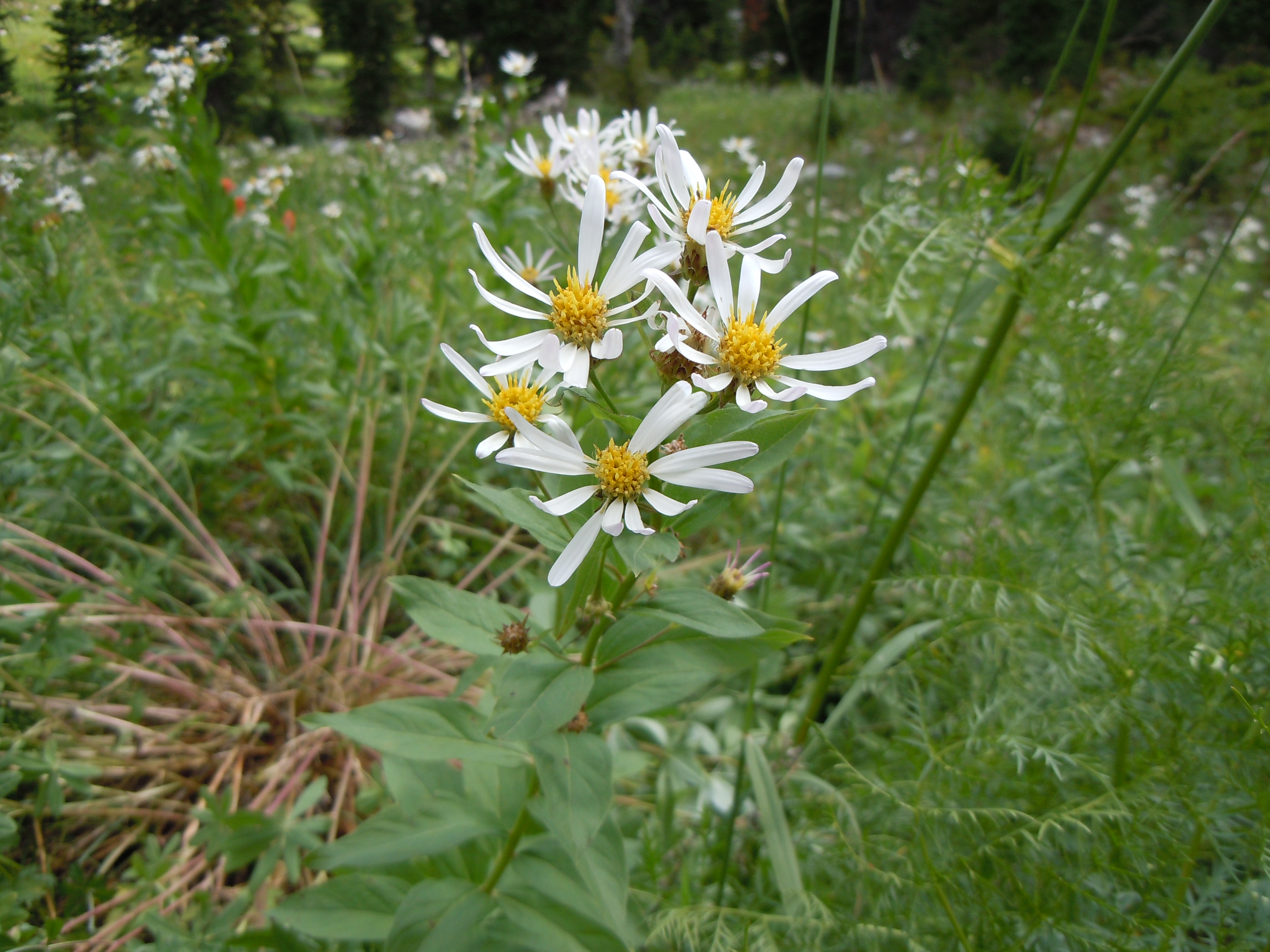

Scientific classification
- Kingdom: Plantae
- Clade: Tracheophytes
- Clade: Angiosperms
- Clade: Eudicots
- Clade: Asterids
- Order: Asterales
- Family: Asteraceae
- Genus: Eucephalus
- Species: E. engelmannii

Binomial name
- Eucephalus engelmannii (D.C.Eaton) Greene

Synonyms
- Aster engelmannii (D.C.Eaton) A.Gray; Aster elegans var. engelmannii D.C.Eaton

= Eucephalus engelmannii =

Species of flowering plant

Eucephalus engelmannii is a North American species in the family Asteraceae known by the common name Engelmann's aster. It is native to the United States and Canada from Alberta and British Columbia to far northern California and Colorado.

E. engelmannii grows in mountain woods and meadows. It is a perennial herb growing from a woody caudex and sending a slender, branching, hairy stem to a maximum height near 1.5 metres (5 feet). The mostly leaves are generally oval and up to 10 centimetres (4 inches) long, with some hair on the bottom and the basal leaves much reduced. The inflorescence holds several flower heads lined in keeled, pointed, hairy-edged phyllaries with purplish margins at the tips. Each head has 8–13 white to pinkish or purplish ray florets each up to 2 cm (3/4 in) long, surrounding a 4–6.5 cm (1 1/2–2 1/2 in) circle of yellow disc florets. The fruit is a hairy achene.
