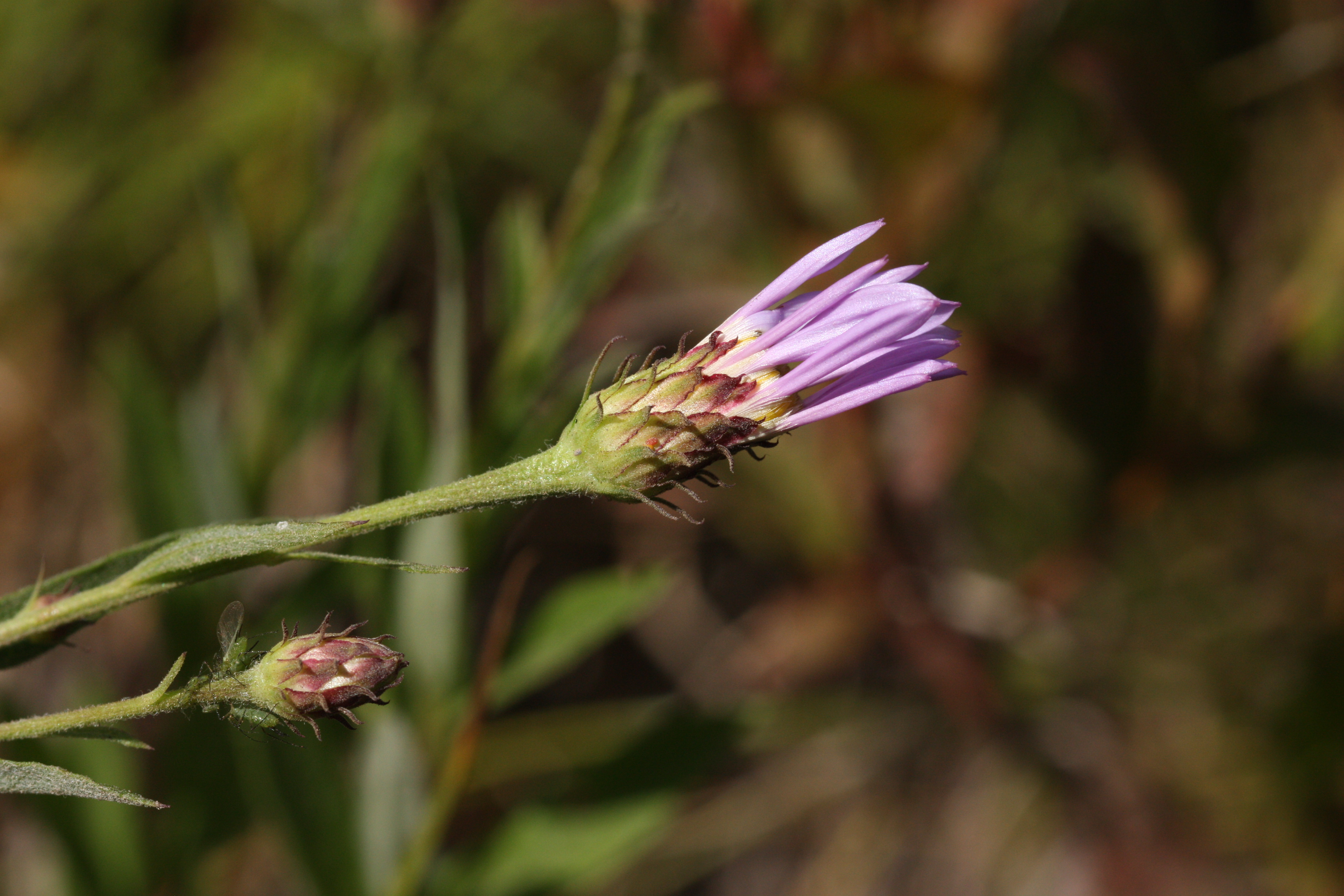
- Dark Divide in Washington
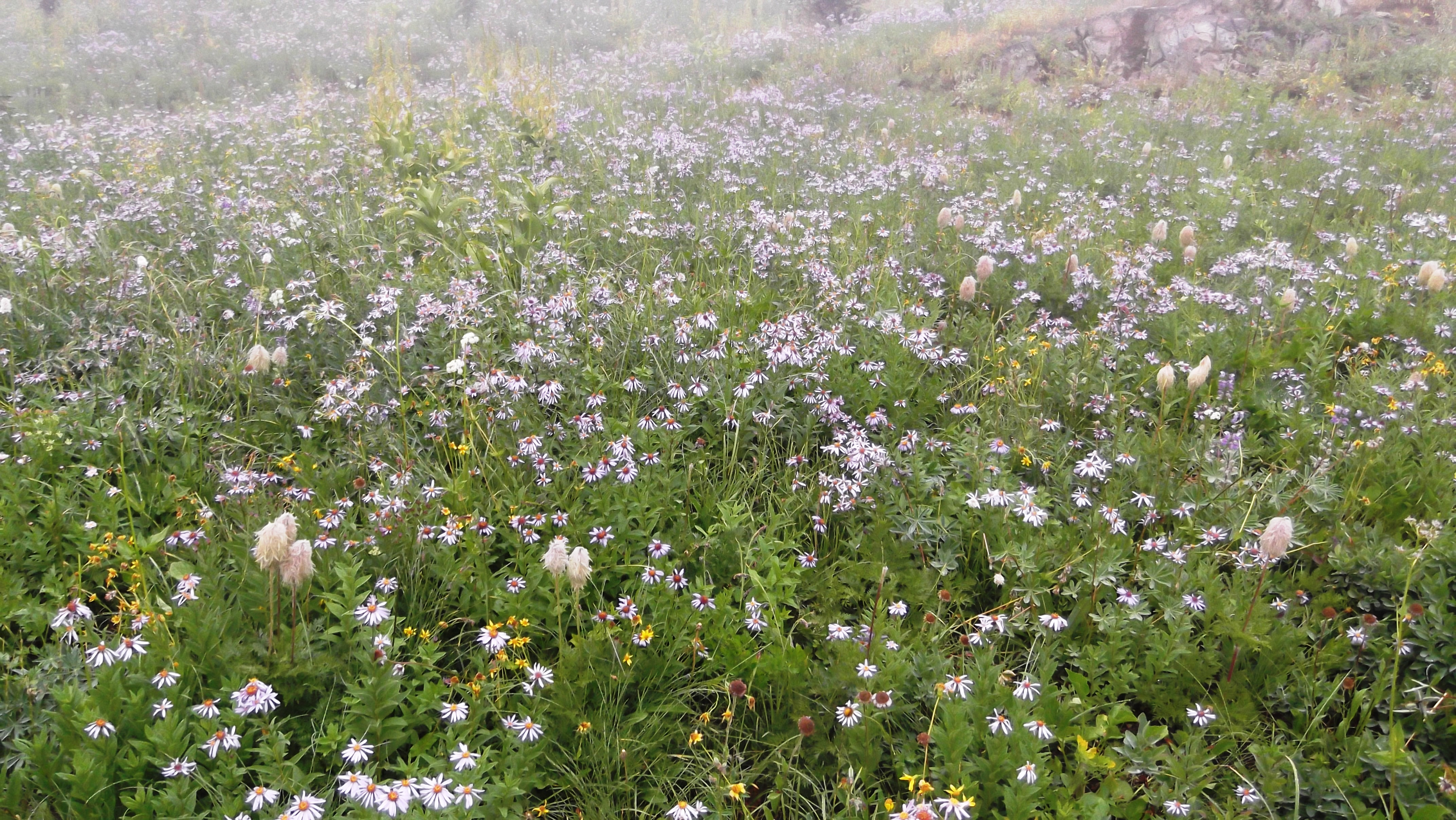
- Mount Rainier National Park

Conservation status
- Secure (NatureServe)

Scientific classification
- Kingdom: Plantae
- Clade: Tracheophytes
- Clade: Angiosperms
- Clade: Eudicots
- Clade: Asterids
- Order: Asterales
- Family: Asteraceae
- Genus: Eucephalus
- Species: E. ledophyllus

Binomial name
- Eucephalus ledophyllus (A.Gray) Greene

Synonyms
- Aster engelmannii var. ledophyllus A. Gray 1872; Aster ledophyllus (A. Gray) A. Gray; Aster covillei (Greene) S.F.Blake ex M.Peck, syn of var. covillei; Doellingeria ledophylla (A.Gray) Semple, Brouillet & G.A.Allen; Eucephalus covillei Greene, syn of var. covillei

= Eucephalus ledophyllus =

Species of flowering plant

Eucephalus ledophyllus is a North American species of flowering plant in the family Asteraceae known by the common name Cascade aster. It is native to Washington, Oregon and northern California in the United States, mostly in the Cascade Mountains. Some of the populations are inside national parks and monuments: Mount Rainier National Park, North Cascades National Park, and Mount St. Helens National Volcanic Monument.

Eucephalus ledophyllus is a perennial herb up to 80 cm (32 inches) tall, with a large woody caudex. One plant will usually produce 3-20 flower heads in a showy array. Each head has 5–21 purple ray florets surrounding numerous yellow disc florets.

Varieties

- Eucephalus ledophyllus var. covillei (Greene) G.L.Nesom - Oregon, California - flower stalks not cottony
- Eucephalus ledophyllus var. ledophyllus - Washington, Oregon - flower stalks cottony
