= Eucephalus glabratus =

Conservation status
- Apparently Secure (NatureServe)

Scientific classification
- Kingdom: Plantae
- Clade: Tracheophytes
- Clade: Angiosperms
- Clade: Eudicots
- Clade: Asterids
- Order: Asterales
- Family: Asteraceae
- Genus: Eucephalus
- Species: E. glabratus

Binomial name
- Eucephalus glabratus (Greene) Greene

Synonyms
- Aster brickellioides var. glabratus Greene; Aster glabratus (Greene) S.F.Blake ex M.Peck; Aster siskiyouensis A.Nelson & J.F.Macbr.; Eucephalus glandulosus Eastw.

Species of plant native to Oregon and California, US

Eucephalus glabratus is a North American species of flowering plant in the family Asteraceae with the common names of smooth aster, smooth wayside-aster, and Siskiyou aster. It is a perennial herb up to 60 centimeters (24 inches) tall, with branching rhizomes. Stems and leaves are hairless or nearly so. One plant will usually produce 3–8 flower heads per stem. Each head has 0–4 violet ray florets surrounding numerous yellow disc florets.

Eucephalus glabratus grows at elevations of 700–2,300 meters (2,300–7,550 feet) in openings in oak and conifer forests or chaparral of the Klamath Mountains of southwestern Oregon and northwestern California.

NatureServe classifies Eucephalus glabratus as Apparently Secure (G4) globally and Vulnerable (S3) in California. It has no state status rank for Oregon.
