= Ionactis =

- Flaxleaf whitetop aster (Ionactis linariifolia)

Scientific classification
- Kingdom: Plantae
- Clade: Embryophytes
- Clade: Tracheophytes
- Clade: Angiosperms
- Clade: Eudicots
- Clade: Asterids
- Order: Asterales
- Family: Asteraceae
- Subfamily: Asteroideae
- Tribe: Astereae
- Subtribe: Ionactinae; G.L.Nesom
- Genus: Ionactis; Greene

Synonyms
- Aster subgenus Ianthe (Torr. & A.Gray) A.Gray

Genus of flowering plants

Ionactis, common name stiff-leaved asters or ankle-asters, is a small genus of plants belonging to the family Asteraceae. These aster-like plants are endemic to North America (Canada and the United States). One species is widespread across much of the eastern half of the continent, while two others are rare endemics with very restricted ranges (see below).

The generic name, Ionactis, is derived from the Greek words "ion", meaning "violet" and "aktis" meaning "ray." This is in allusion to the ray florets, frequently pale purple in this genus.

Ionactis was classified as a separate genus by Edward Lee Greene in 1897 with the species Ionactis linariifolia, which had been classified by Carl Linnaeus as Aster linariifolius. The species of Aster (in a strict sense) are now restricted to Eurasia.

The stiff-leaved Asters are perennial herbs with numerous green stems, about 2.5 cm (1.0 in) long, rarely 10 cm (3.9 in), usually in a tussock. The spatulate leaves are small, stiff, sharply ascending and thick about the stem. The upper leaves are much smaller than the lower. Yellow-orange resin droplets form on the leaves of the Red Rock Canyon Aster (Ionactis caelestis).

The involucral phyllaries (bracts under the flower head) are narrow and overlapping. They have, along the midrib, a narrow zone containing chlorophyll. The silky-hairy, fusiform achenes form a crown with a double pappus in two series, the inner one with long, barbellate bristles, the outer one with short bristles or minute scales.

The small flower heads grow solitary or sometimes in a cluster at the end of the stems. The 10–24 fertile ray florets are nearly white, blue to pink, lavender, purple or blue violet. The sterile disc florets are yellowish. The peduncles are nearly naked.

They have a chromosome base number of x = 9.

Species

- Ionactis alpina (Nutt.) Greene – Lava ankle-aster – California Nevada Oregon Idaho Utah Wyoming Montana
- Ionactis caelestis P.J.Leary & G.L.Nesom – Spring Mountain ankle-aster, aster – Red Rock Canyon National Conservation Area, Clark County in Nevada
- Ionactis elegans (Soreng & Spellenb.) G.L.Nesom – Sierra Blanca cliff daisy. – Eagle Creek Canyon in Lincoln County in New Mexico
- Ionactis linariifolia (L.) Greene – Flaxleaf whitetop aster, grass-leaf aster, narrow-leaved white-topped aster – eastern + central North America from eastern Texas to Québec and New Brunswick
- Ionactis stenomeres (A.Gray) Greene – Rocky Mountain ankle-aster – British Columbia Washington Idaho Montana
