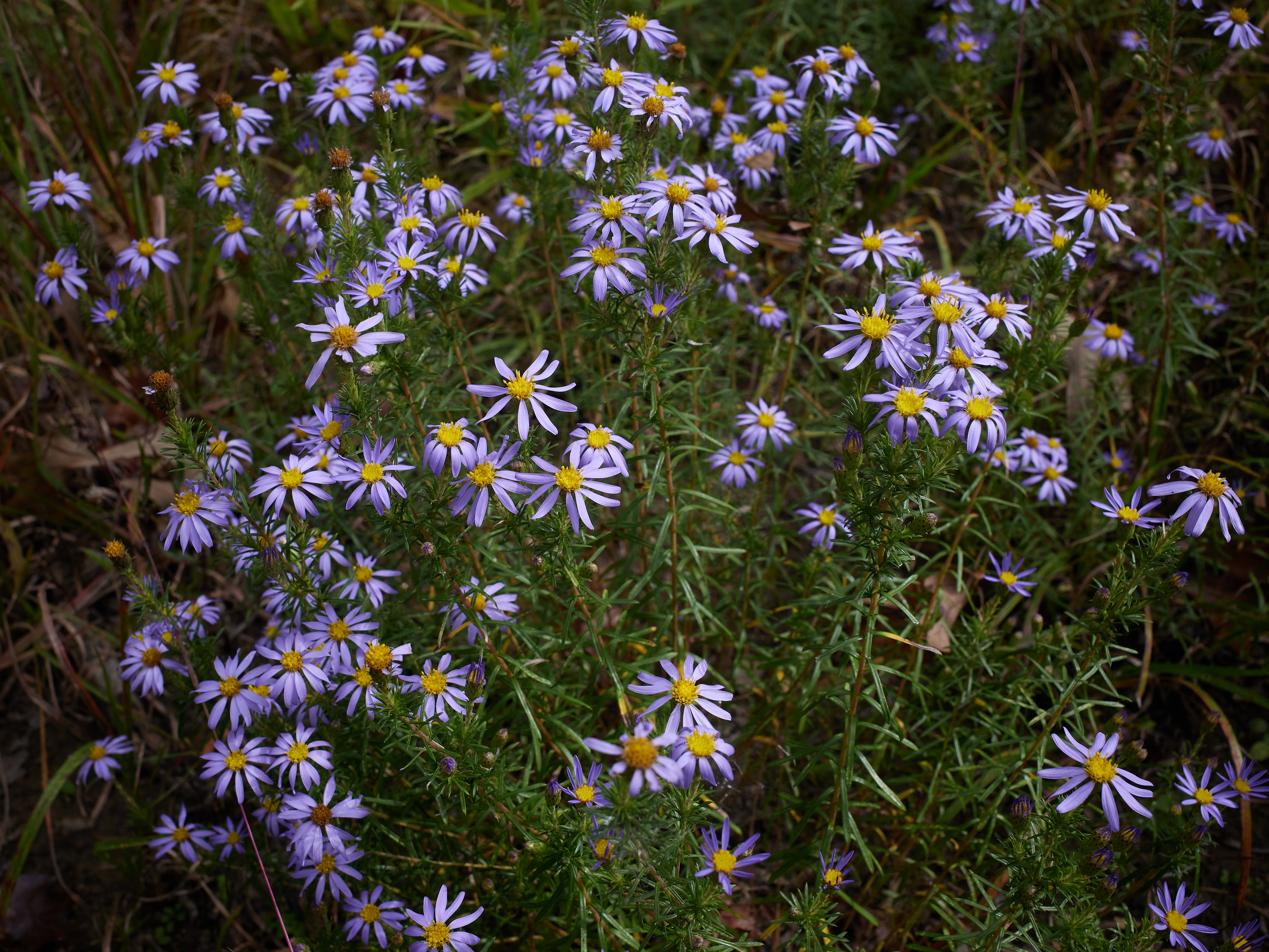

Scientific classification
- Kingdom: Plantae
- Clade: Tracheophytes
- Clade: Angiosperms
- Clade: Eudicots
- Clade: Asterids
- Order: Asterales
- Family: Asteraceae
- Genus: Ionactis
- Species: I. linariifolia

Binomial name
- Ionactis linariifolia (L.) Greene 1897

Synonyms
- Synonymy: Aster linariifolius L. 1753; Aster pulcherrimus Lodd.; Aster rigidus L.; Chrysopsis linariifolia (L.) DC.; Diplopappus linariifolius Lindl.; Diplopappus linariifolius (L.) Hook.; Diplopappus rigidus Lindl.; Diplostephium linariifolium (L.) Nees; Diplostephium rigidum (Pursh) Sweet

= Ionactis linariifolia =

Species of flowering plant

Ionactis linariifolia also known as the flax-leaf ankle-aster, flaxleaf whitetop or simply aster is a North American species of plants in the family Asteraceae.

Ionactis linariifolia grows across much of eastern and central North America from Florida north as far as Québec and New Brunswick, and west to extreme eastern Texas. It is found in a variety of habitats such as moist sites, oak pine woods, ridges, and bluffs.

Ionactis linariifolia is an herb up to 70 cm (28 inches) tall. Leaves are green, long and narrow, up to 4 cm (1.6 inches) long. The plant usually produces several flower heads in a flat-topped array. Each head has blue, white, or violet ray flowers surrounding numerous yellow disc flowers.

It was initially classified by Carolus Linnaeus as Aster linariifolius, known as the stiff-leafed aster. Ionactis was classified as a separate genus by Edward Lee Greene in 1897.

1913 Line drawing
