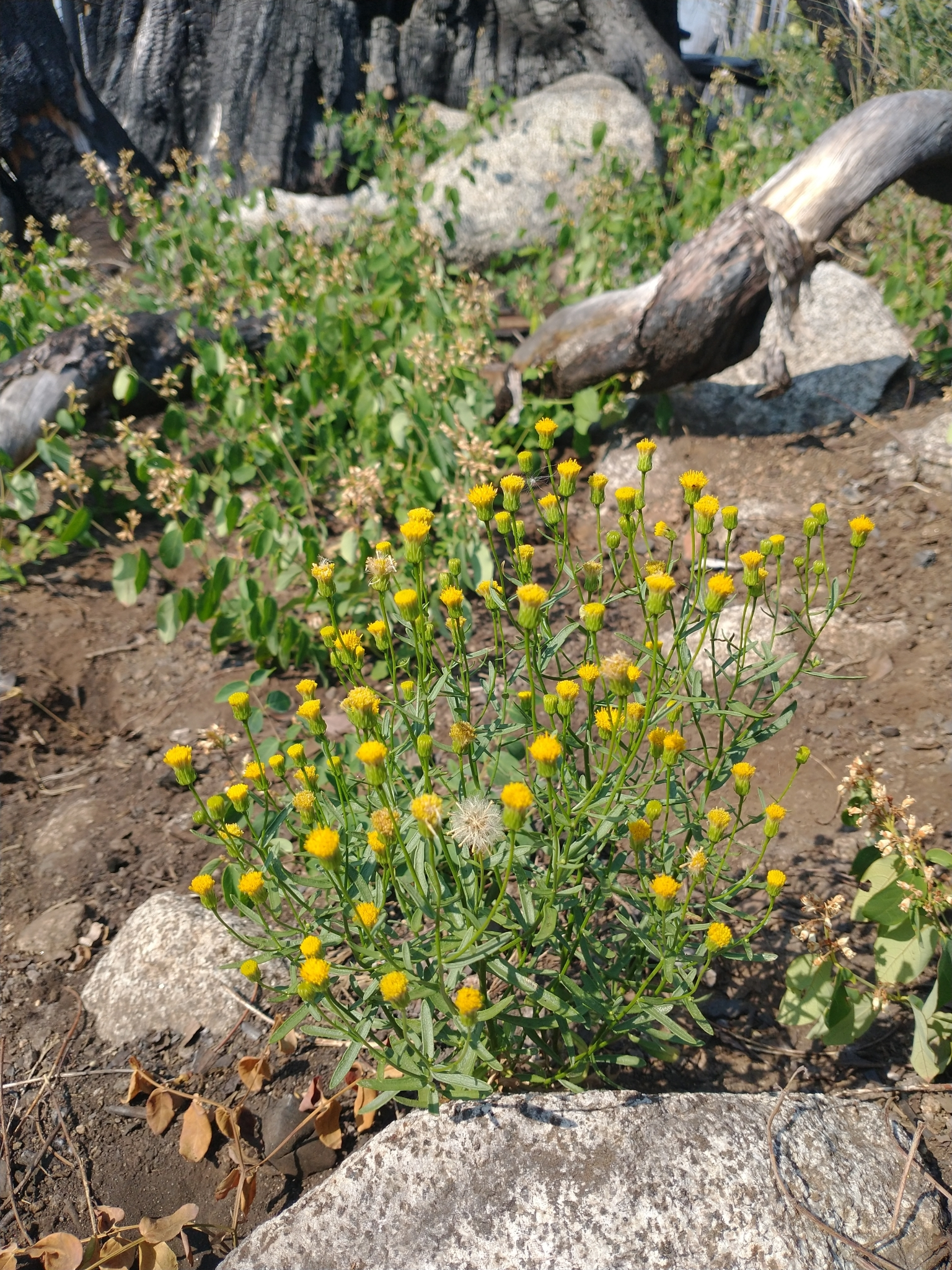

Scientific classification
- Kingdom: Plantae
- Clade: Tracheophytes
- Clade: Angiosperms
- Clade: Eudicots
- Clade: Asterids
- Order: Asterales
- Family: Asteraceae
- Genus: Eucephalus
- Species: E. breweri

Binomial name
- Eucephalus breweri (A.Gray) G.L.Nesom

Synonyms
- Synonymy: Aster breweri (A.Gray) Semple; Chrysopsis breweri A.Gray; Chrysopsis gracilis Eastw.; Chrysopsis wrightii A.Gray; Diplogon breweri (A.Gray) Kuntze; Heterotheca breweri (A.Gray) Shinners

= Eucephalus breweri =

Species of plant

Eucephalus breweri is a North American species in the family Asteraceae known by the common name Brewer's aster. It is native to California where it grows primarily in the Sierra Nevada at subalpine elevations. Its range extends into northwestern Nevada and southwestern Oregon.

Eucephalus breweri is a perennial herb growing from a woody caudex to a maximum height anywhere between 10 centimeters (4 inches) and one meter (39 inches). The stems are mainly erect and are coated in woolly fibers and resin glands. The abundant hairy, glandular leaves are lance-shaped to oval, pointed, and smooth or toothed along the edges. They are up to 5 centimeters (2 inches) long. The inflorescence holds several discoid flower heads which are packed with long yellow disc florets but no ray florets. They are lined with hairy, glandular phyllaries. The fruit is a hairy achene.
