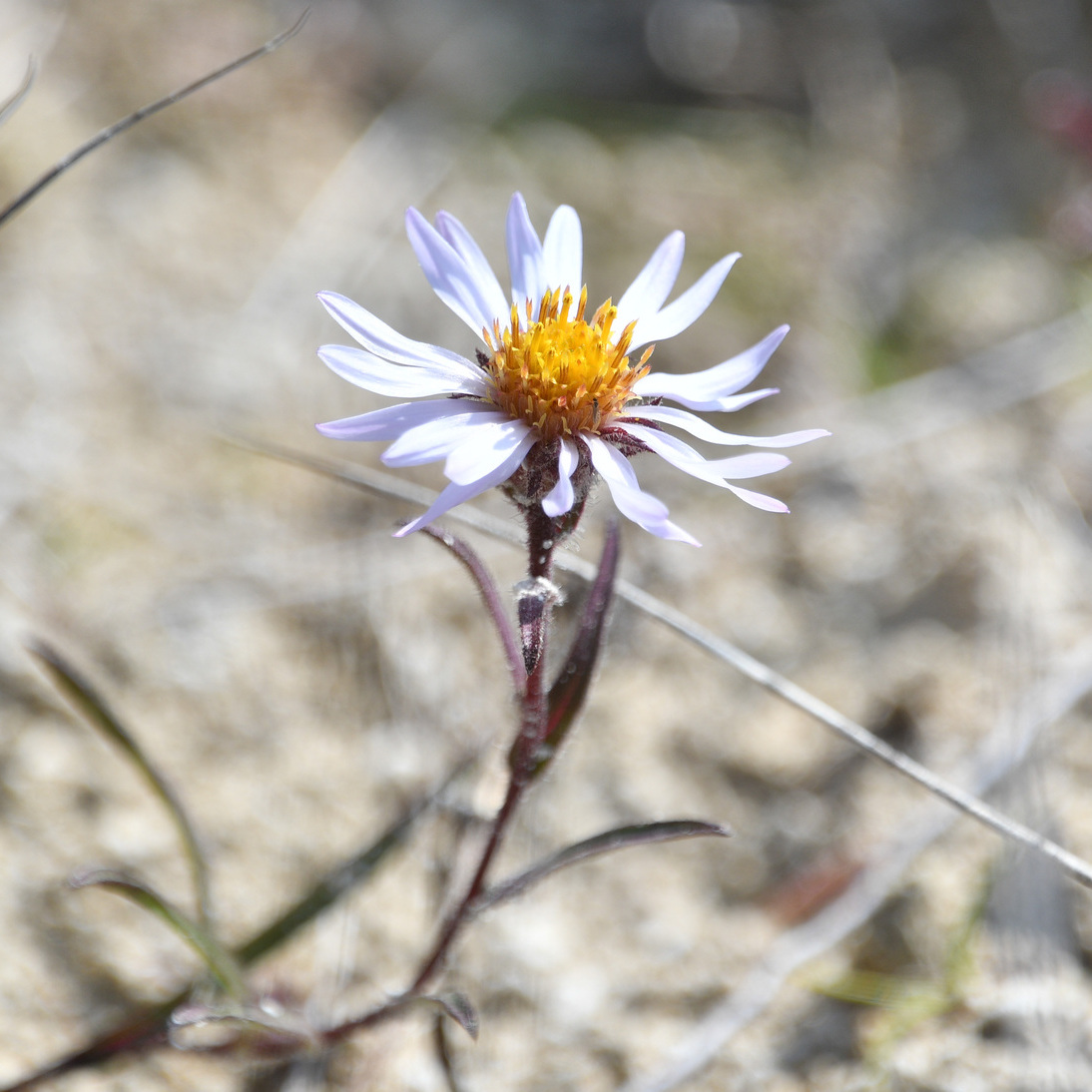

Conservation status
- Vulnerable (NatureServe)

Scientific classification
- Kingdom: Plantae
- Clade: Tracheophytes
- Clade: Angiosperms
- Clade: Eudicots
- Clade: Asterids
- Order: Asterales
- Family: Asteraceae
- Tribe: Astereae
- Subtribe: Symphyotrichinae
- Genus: Symphyotrichum
- Subgenus: Symphyotrichum subg. Virgulus
- Section: Symphyotrichum sect. Grandiflori
- Species: S. yukonense

Binomial name
- Symphyotrichum yukonense (Cronquist) G.L.Nesom
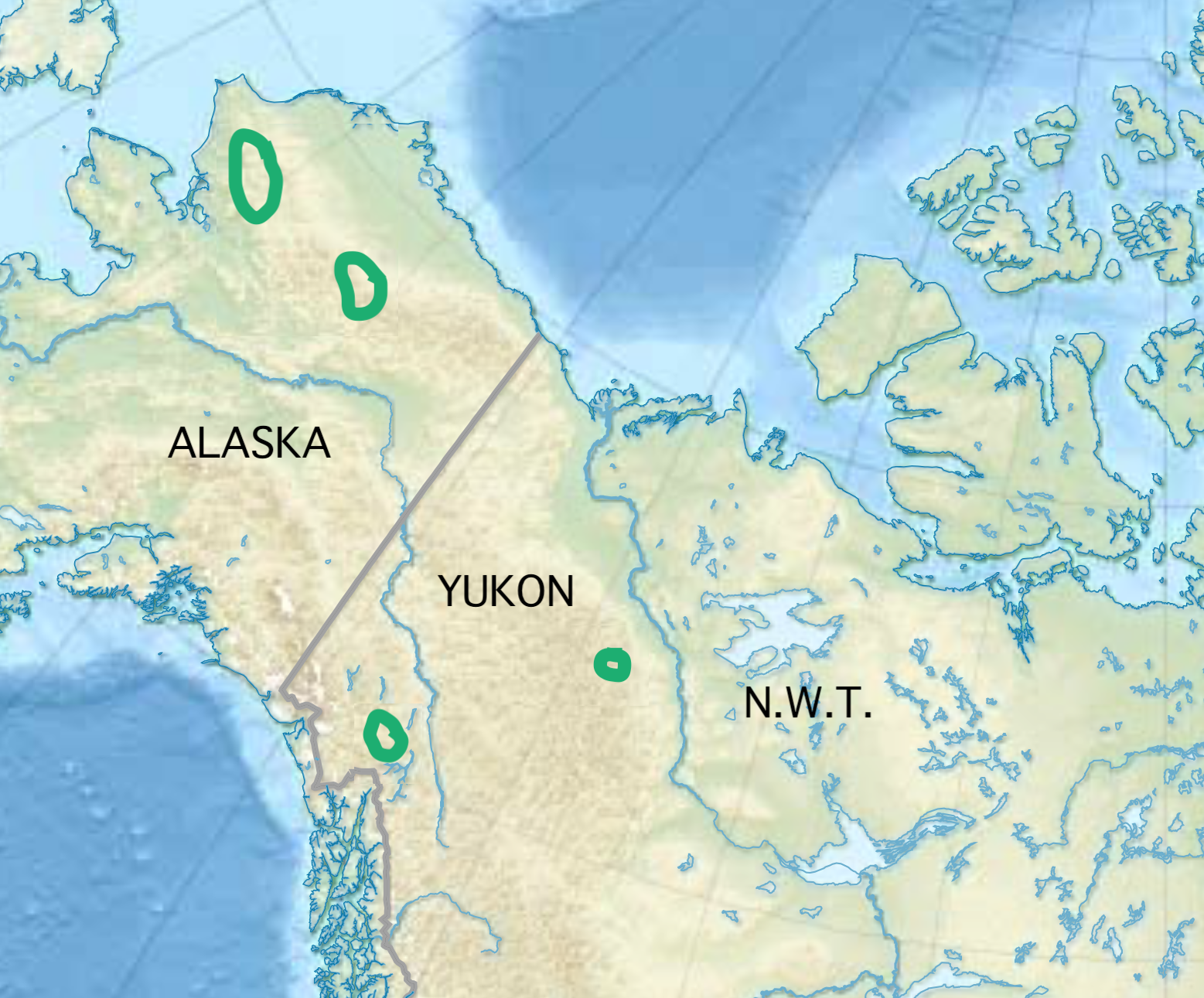
- Native distribution

Synonyms
- Aster yukonensis Cronquist; Virgulus yukonensis (Cronquist) Reveal & Keener

= Symphyotrichum yukonense =

Species of plant in the aster family

Symphyotrichum yukonense (formerly Aster yukonensis) is a species of flowering plant in the family Asteraceae endemic to disjunct areas in Alaska and the Canadian territories of Yukon and Northwest Territories. It has the common name of Yukon aster, and it is a perennial, herbaceous plant 5 to 30 centimeters (2 to 12 inches) in height. Its flowers have purple to blue ray florets and yellow to brown disk florets. S. yukonense grows at elevations of 300–1,500 meters (1,000–4,900 feet) in mud flats and on sandy or silty lake shores. It is a NatureServe Vulnerable (G3) species and is classified Imperiled (S2) in its Canadian range.

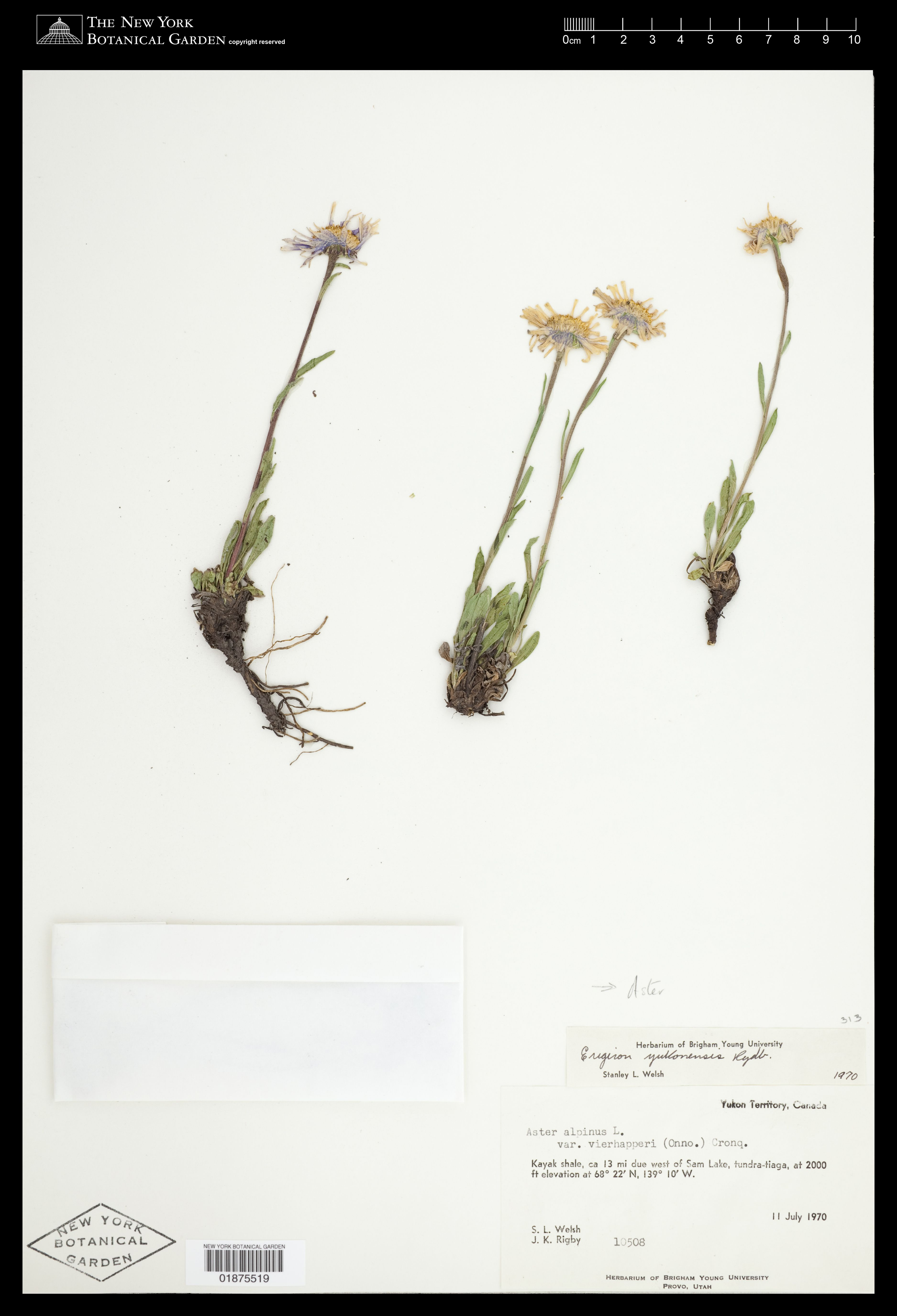
S. yukonense herbarium specimen

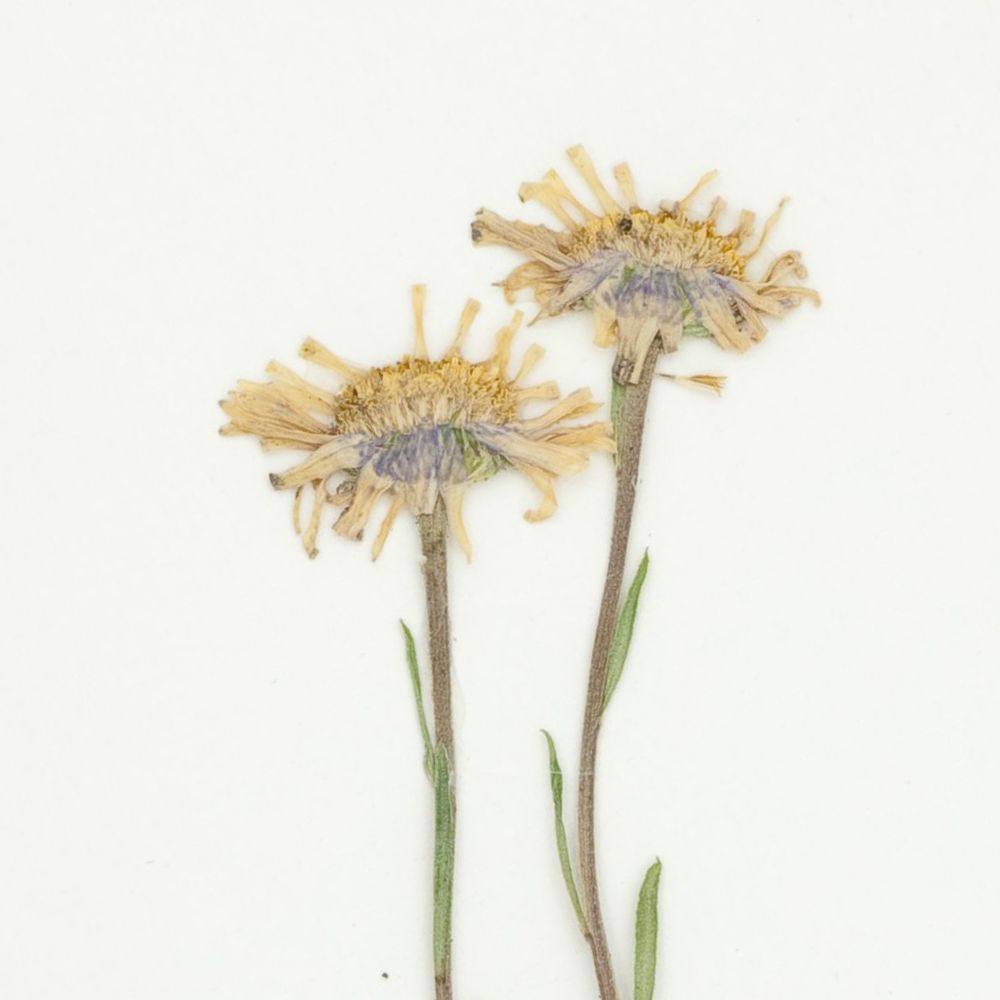
S. yukonense specimen close-up
