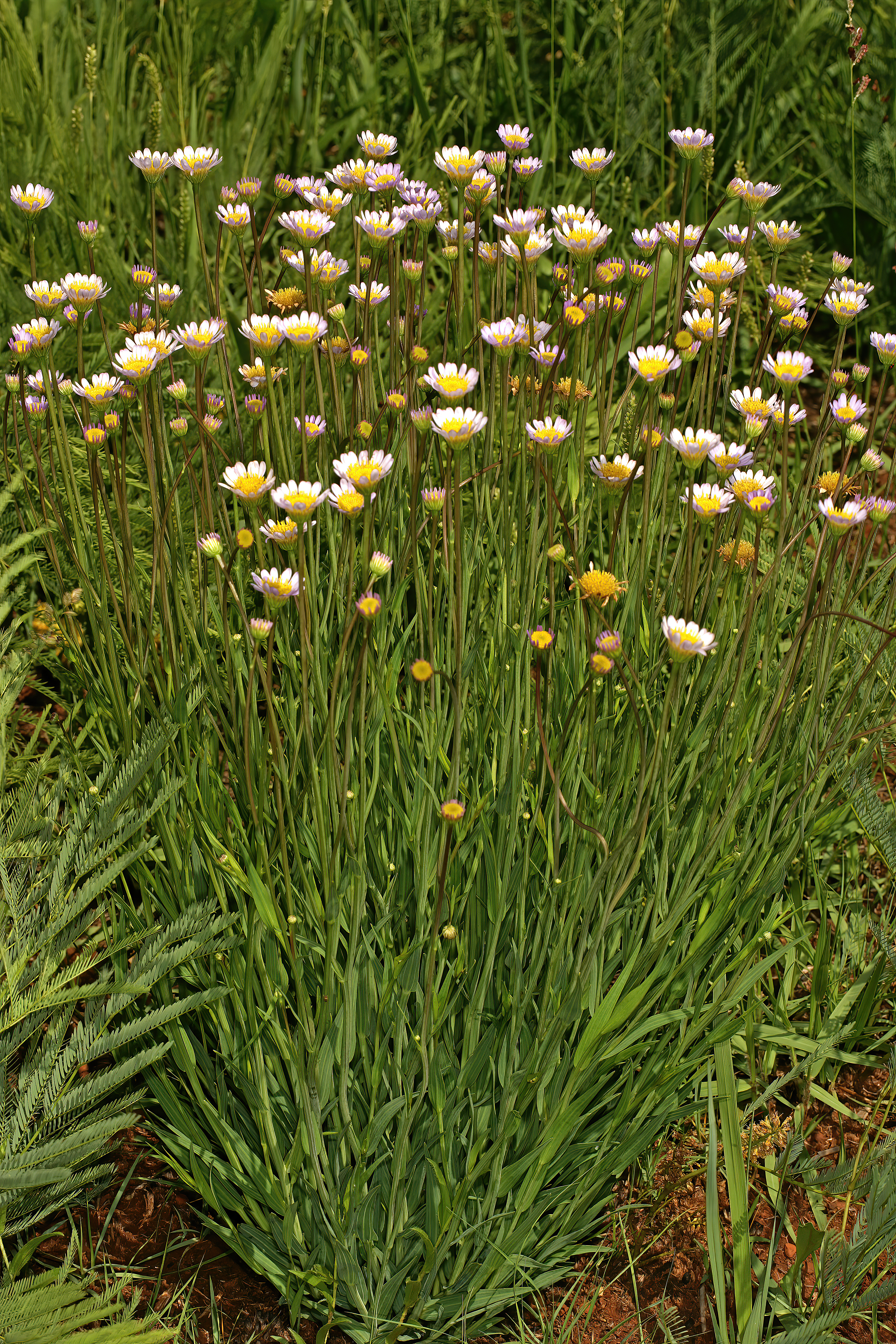
- Afroaster serrulatus

Scientific classification
- Kingdom: Plantae
- Clade: Tracheophytes
- Clade: Angiosperms
- Clade: Eudicots
- Clade: Asterids
- Order: Asterales
- Family: Asteraceae
- Subfamily: Asteroideae
- Tribe: Astereae
- Subtribe: Afroasterinae; G.L.Nesom
- Genus: Afroaster; J.C.Manning & Goldblatt

= Afroaster =

Genus of flowering plants

Afroaster is a genus of flowering plants belonging to the family Asteraceae.

Its native range is Tanzania to Southern Africa.

Species:

- Afroaster ananthocladus (Hilliard & B.L.Burtt) J.C.Manning & Goldblatt
- Afroaster bowiei (Harv.) J.C.Manning & Goldblatt
- Afroaster chimanimaniensis (W.Lippert) J.C.Manning & Goldblatt
- Afroaster comptonii (W.Lippert) J.C.Manning & Goldblatt
- Afroaster confertifolius (Hilliard & B.L.Burtt) J.C.Manning & Goldblatt
- Afroaster erucifolius (Thell.) J.C.Manning & Goldblatt
- Afroaster hispidus (Thunb.) J.C.Manning & Goldblatt
- Afroaster laevigatus (Sond.) J.C.Manning & Goldblatt
- Afroaster lydenburgensis (W.Lippert) J.C.Manning & Goldblatt
- Afroaster milanjiensis (S.Moore) J.C.Manning & Goldblatt
- Afroaster nubimontis (W.Lippert) J.C.Manning & Goldblatt
- Afroaster peglerae (Bolus) J.C.Manning & Goldblatt
- Afroaster perfoliatus (Oliv.) J.C.Manning & Goldblatt
- Afroaster pleiocephalus (Harv.) J.C.Manning & Goldblatt
- Afroaster pseudobakerianus (W.Lippert) J.C.Manning & Goldblatt
- Afroaster serrulatus (Harv.) J.C.Manning & Goldblatt
- Afroaster tansaniensis (W.Lippert) J.C.Manning & Goldblatt
- Afroaster zuluensis (W.Lippert) J.C.Manning & Goldblatt
