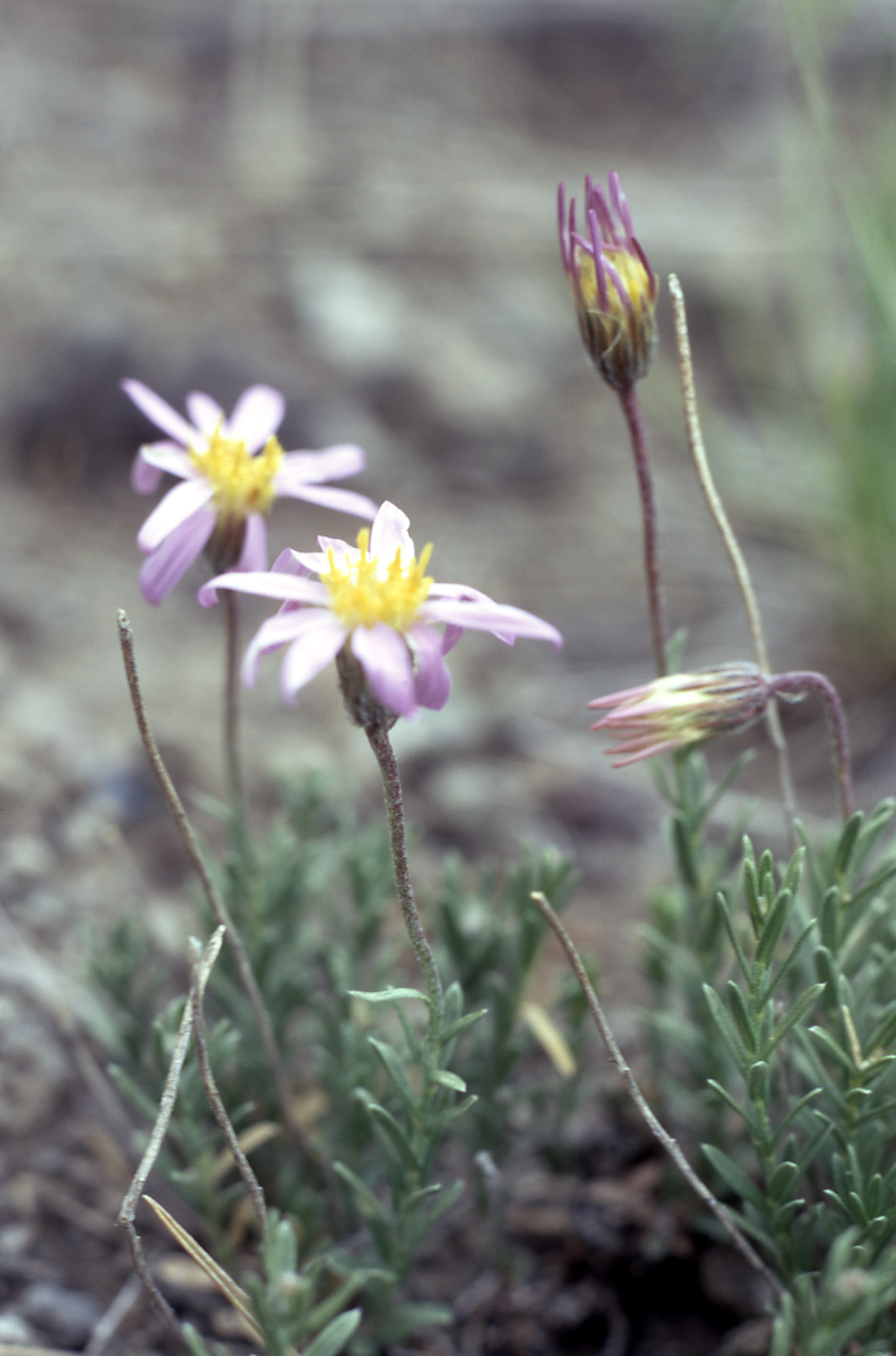

Scientific classification
- Kingdom: Plantae
- Clade: Tracheophytes
- Clade: Angiosperms
- Clade: Eudicots
- Clade: Asterids
- Order: Asterales
- Family: Asteraceae
- Genus: Ionactis
- Species: I. alpina

Binomial name
- Ionactis alpina (Nutt.) Greene 1897

Synonyms
- Aster scopulorum A.Gray 1880; Chrysopsis alpina Nutt. 1834 not Aster alpinus L. 1753; Diplopappus alpinus (Nutt.) Nutt.; Leucelene alpina (Nutt.) Greene

= Ionactis alpina =

Species of plant

Ionactis alpina (formerly Aster scopulorum; common name lava ankle-aster) is a species of flowering plant in the family Asteraceae known by the common name lava aster. It is native to western United States from California to Montana, where it grows in dry areas.

== Description ==
Ionactis alpina is a perennial herb growing from a caudex and fibrous root system. It produces a short, mostly erect, hairy stem up to 12 centimetres (4 3/4 in) in height. Most of the small leaves are on the lower part of the stem. They are up to about 1 cm (3/8 in) long, oval to lance-shaped and pointed, somewhat stiff and coated in hairs.

The inflorescence bears solitary flower heads with purple-green phyllaries, 7–21 thin blue, purple, or occasionally white ray florets surrounding 19–50 long yellow disc florets. The fruit is a hairy achene.
