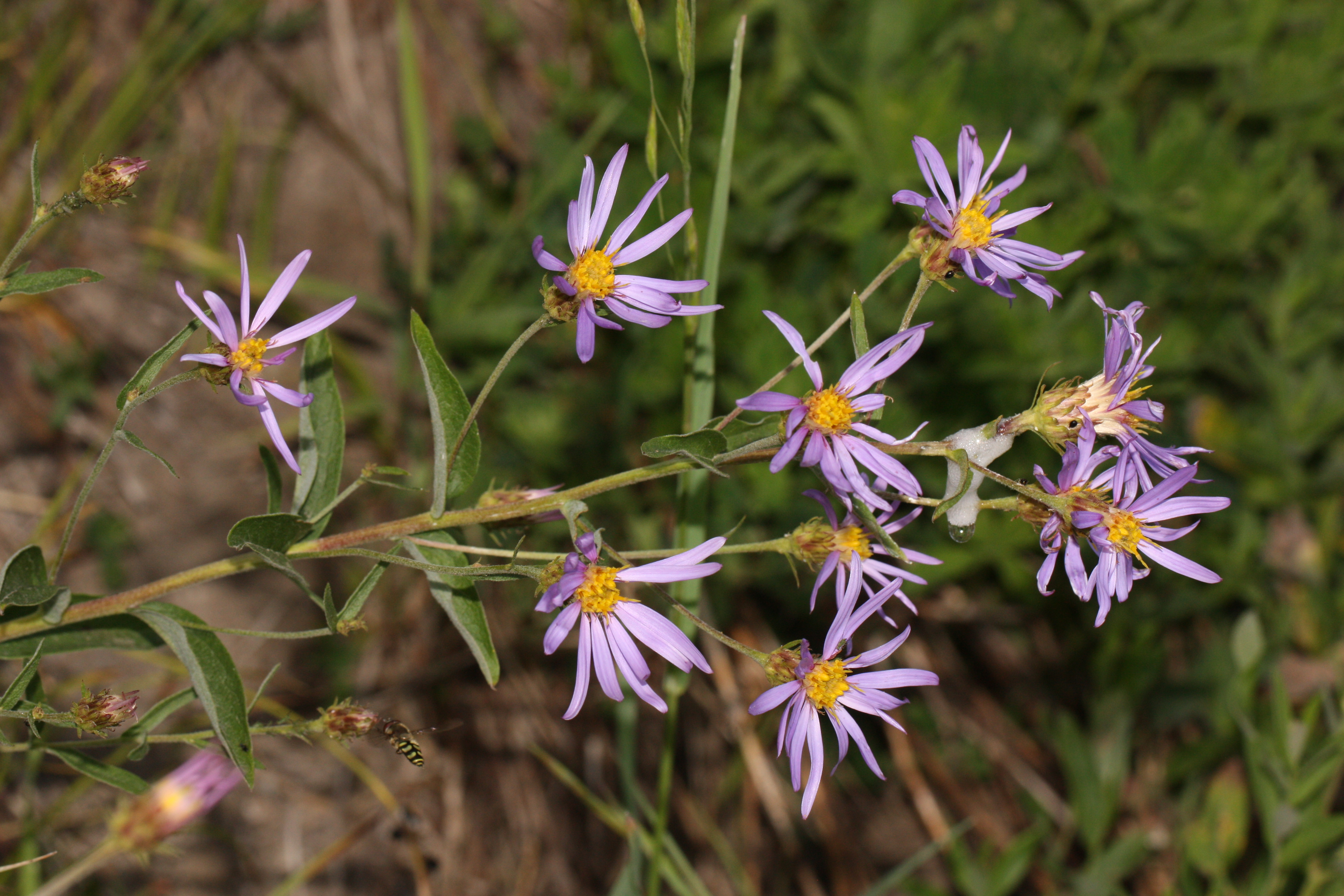
- Eucephalus ledophyllus Dark Divide, Washington

Scientific classification
- Kingdom: Plantae
- Clade: Embryophytes
- Clade: Tracheophytes
- Clade: Angiosperms
- Clade: Eudicots
- Clade: Asterids
- Order: Asterales
- Family: Asteraceae
- Subfamily: Asteroideae
- Tribe: Astereae
- Subtribe: Doellingeriinae
- Genus: Eucephalus; Nutt.

Type species
- Eucephalus elegans Nutt.

Synonyms
- Aster sect. Eucephalus (Nutt.) Munz & D.D. Keck ex A.G. Jones; Aster subsect. Eucephalus (Nutt.) Benth.

= Eucephalus (plant) =

Genus of flowering plants

Eucephalus is a genus of North American flowering plants in the family Asteraceae.

Eucephalus is a perennial up to 160 cm (64 inches) tall. It has numerous flower heads, some species with both ray disc florets but others with only disc florets. Disc florets are nearly always yellow in the genus, but ray florets can be white, pink, purple, or violet.

Species

- Eucephalus breweri – California Nevada Oregon
- Eucephalus elegans – Nevada Oregon Idaho Montana Wyoming Utah Colorado
- Eucephalus engelmannii – California Nevada Utah Colorado Idaho Montana Washington British Columbia Alberta
- Eucephalus glabratus – California Oregon
- Eucephalus glaucescens Washington
- Eucephalus gormanii – Oregon
- Eucephalus ledophyllus – California Oregon Washington
- Eucephalus paucicapitatus – Washington British Columbia Alberta
- Eucephalus tomentellus – California Oregon
- Eucephalus vialis – California Oregon
