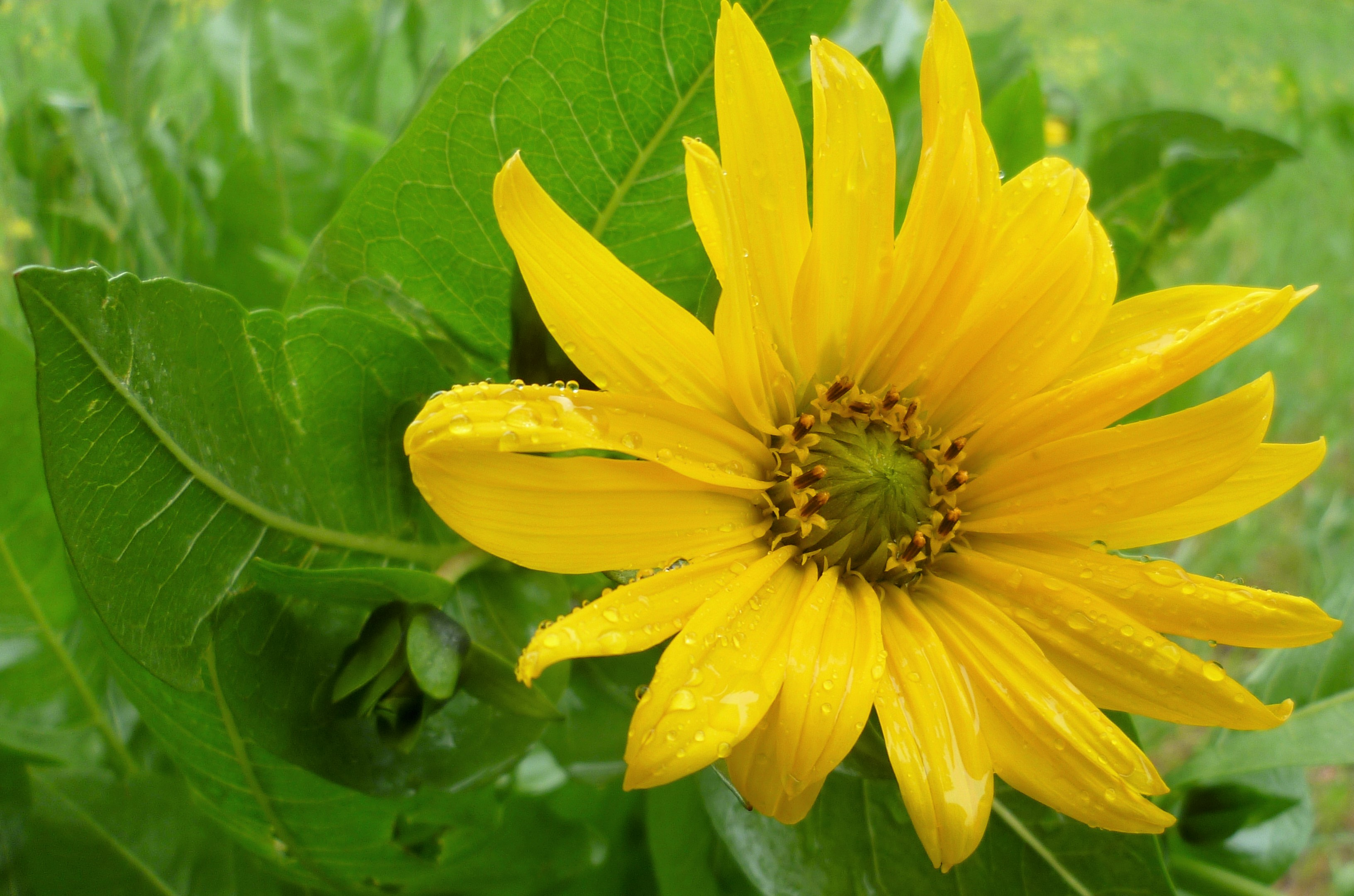

Conservation status
- Apparently Secure (NatureServe)

Scientific classification
- Kingdom: Plantae
- Clade: Tracheophytes
- Clade: Angiosperms
- Clade: Eudicots
- Clade: Asterids
- Order: Asterales
- Family: Asteraceae
- Tribe: Heliantheae
- Genus: Wyethia
- Species: W. amplexicaulis

Binomial name
- Wyethia amplexicaulis (Nutt.) Nutt.

Synonyms
- Espeletia amplexicaulis; Wyethia lanceolata; Wyethia major; Wyethia subresinosa

= Wyethia amplexicaulis =

Species of flowering plant in the family Asteraceae

Wyethia amplexicaulis is a common herbaceous perennial plant from the northwestern United States called northern wyethia, northern mule ears, or black sunflower.

Because of its tendency to grow together in dense colonies and its large, showy flowering heads, it is a well-known western wildflower that is often photographed. The leaves are not very palatable to large herbivores including livestock.

== Description ==
Wyethia amplexicaulis is a cool-season forb (a flowering plant with broad leaves) that usually grows 25–50 centimeters (10–19 1/2 in) tall, but may occasionally reach 100 cm (39 in). It has many leaves that grow directly from the base of the plant (basal leaves) that are most often 15–30 cm (6–12 in) long, though sometimes reaching about 40 cm (16 in). Their width is usually about 15 cm. The leaves are a shining green, especially on the upper surface due to a light coating of resin (vernicose), with a smooth surface and have a range of possible shapes. They can be slightly lance point shaped, but widest at the midpoint and tapering smoothly to the tip and base (lance-elliptic), somewhat more rectangular in shape with the sides becoming more parallel, but still with an overall lance point shape (oblong-lanceolate), or fully lanceolate, long and narrow with a very pointed tip and tapered base. The edges of the leaves are most often smooth (entire), but will sometimes have small, fine teeth (denticulate) or even be clearly toothed (dentate), but they never have hairs on the edges of the leaves. The basal leaves are attached by a short stem.

The leaves attached to the stems are the same in shape, but become smaller the higher up they are attached and those highest up lack a leaf stem with the base of the leaf clasping the stem. The leaves attached to the stem are arranged alternately on it.

The plants flower May through July. Most often there are 2–8 flower heads, though occasionally a plant will only produce only one. The flowering head at the end of the stem (the terminal flower head) is generally the largest with the other flowering heads sprouting from where leaves attach to the stem (axillary heads) being smaller in size. The structure supporting the flower head (the involucre) ranges in shape from half a sphere to being more of a beetroot shape and is 15–30 millimeters in diameter. The number of bracts (phyllaries) is 18 to more than 36 and have smooth faces without hairs along the edges and the outer ones being the longest at 18–32 millimeters. The ray flowers are large and showy, bright yellow-orange with the petals 25–60 mm long. Usually there are 8 to 21 ray flowers, but occasionally there may be as many as 25.

The fruit is technically called a cypsela, a type of dry fruit that resembles an achene. Even botanical professionals will frequently say that it produces achenes and non-botanists such as gardeners will usually simply refer to these fruits as seeds. Each fruit is 8–9 mm long, four sided and has a low crown of small scales at one end.

The taproot is 4–7 cm (1 1/2–2 3/4 in) in diameter, and can reach depths of 1.8 meters (6 ft) into the soil. Lateral roots can grow to around one meter in length, excluding the main root. At the top of the roots is a structure called a caudex, that can be simple or branched. The caudex will be covered in buds resembling that of woody plants. All parts of W. amplexicaulis have a strong odor.

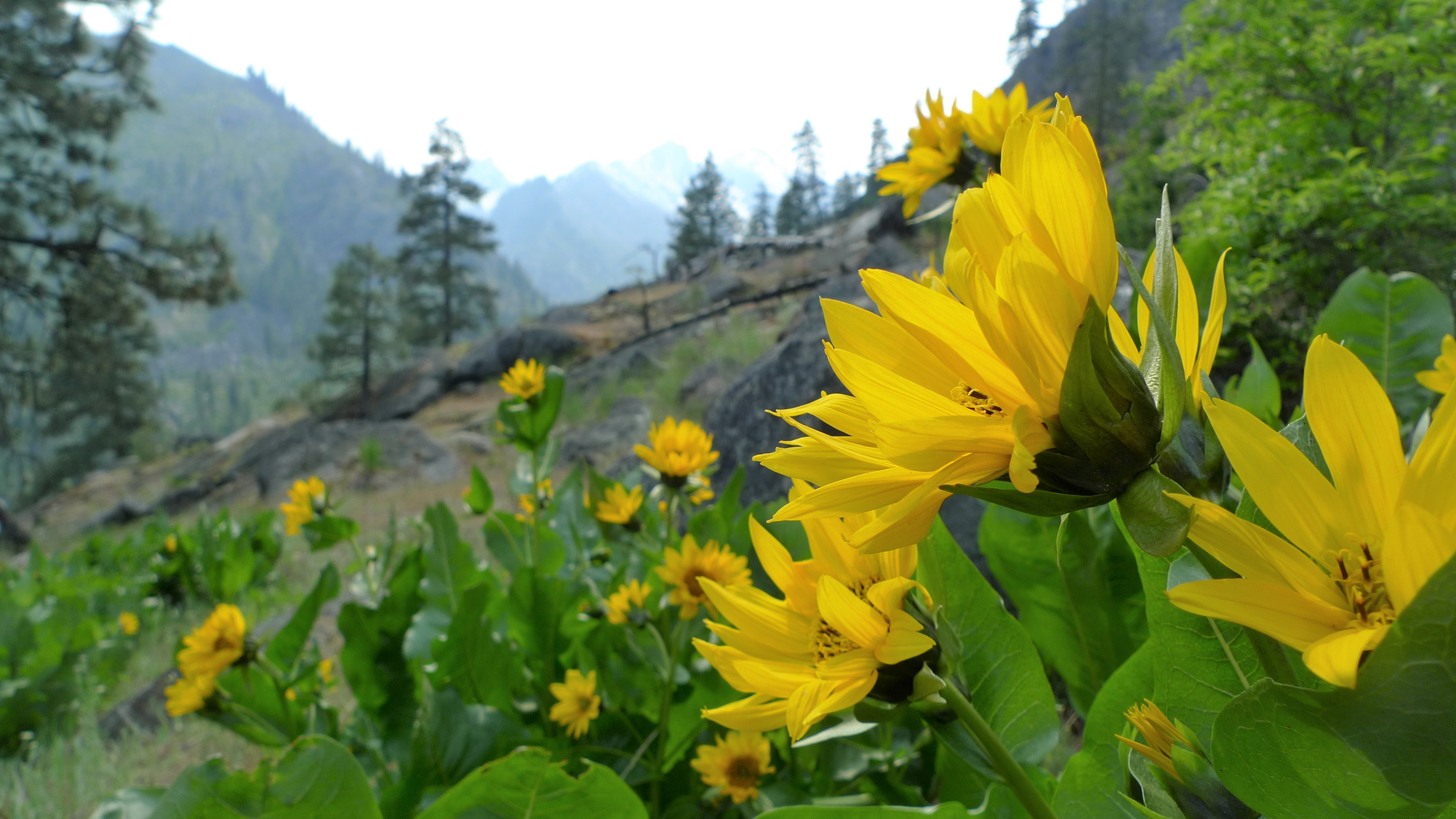
Growing in Washington state

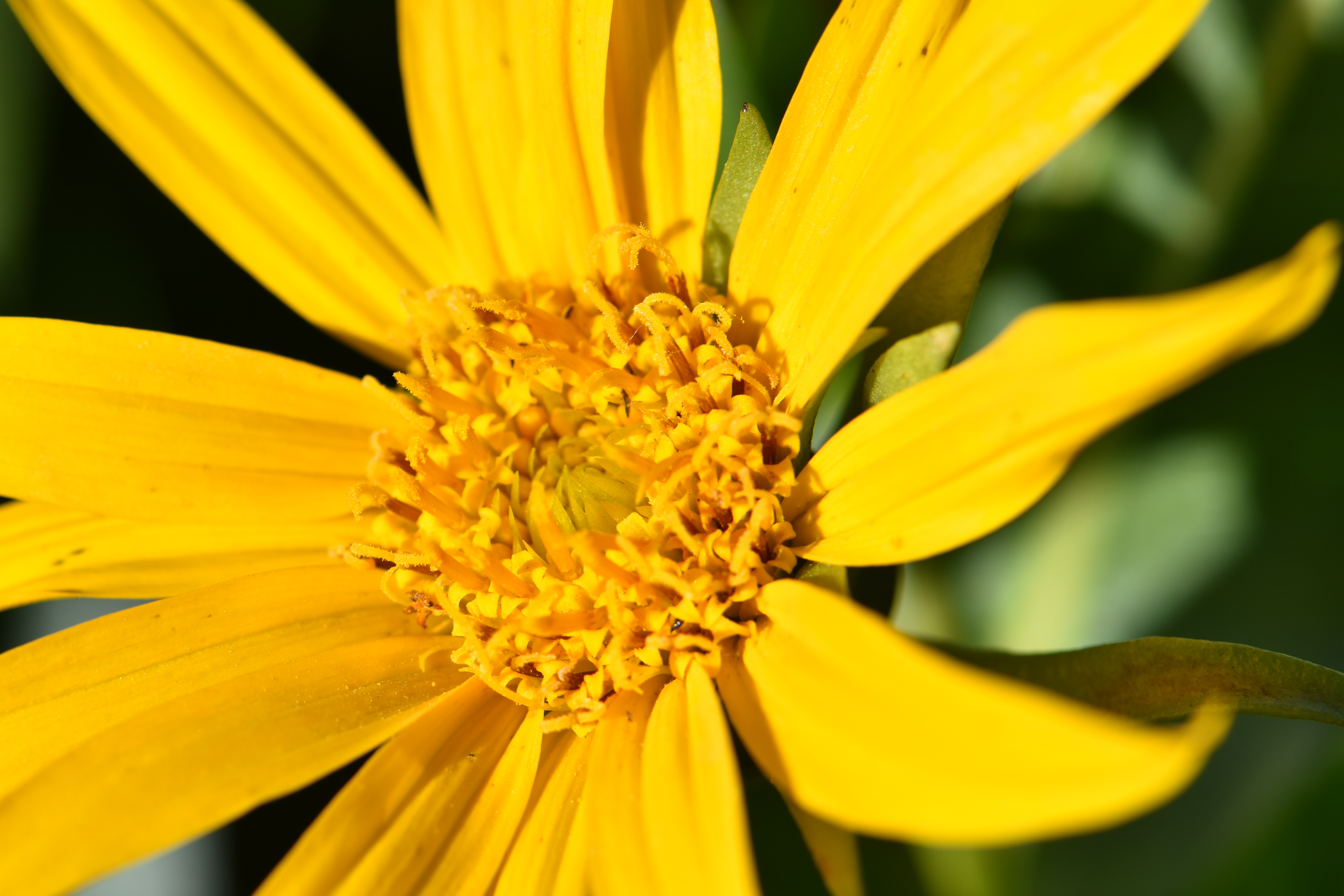
Flower head close-up

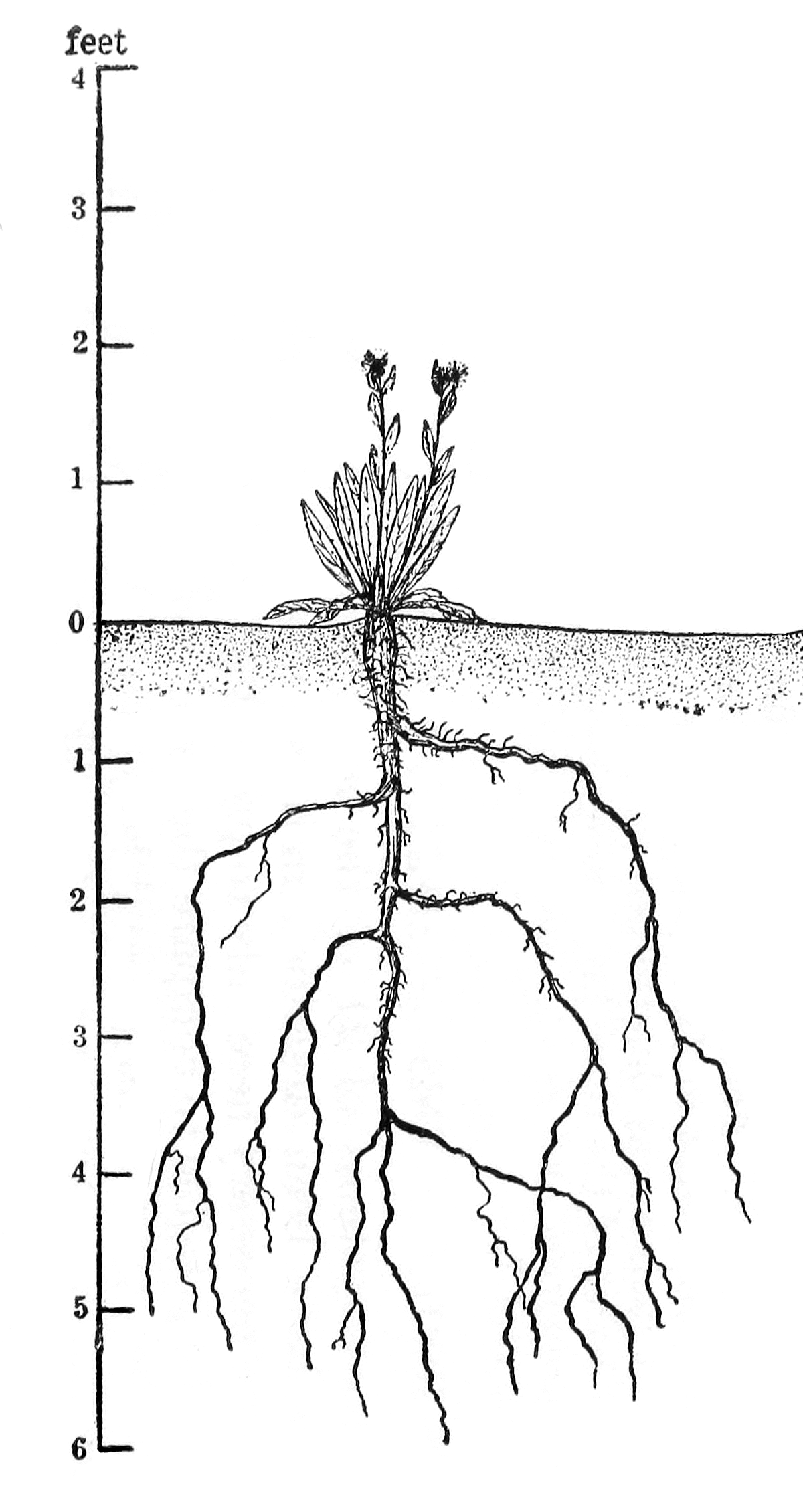
Root

=== Similar species ===
Wyethia amplexicaulis may be confused with other sunflower like species such as Balsamorhiza (balsamroot), but can be distinguished by the varnish covered leaves that clasp the stem and lack hairs or divisions to the leaves. Though W. amplexicaulis is very distinct from its relatives Wyethia helianthoides and Wyethia arizonica, both of these species having many hairs upon their leaves and stems, there can be at times some confusion as W. amplexicaulis will hybridize with both these species where their ranges overlap.

== Taxonomy ==
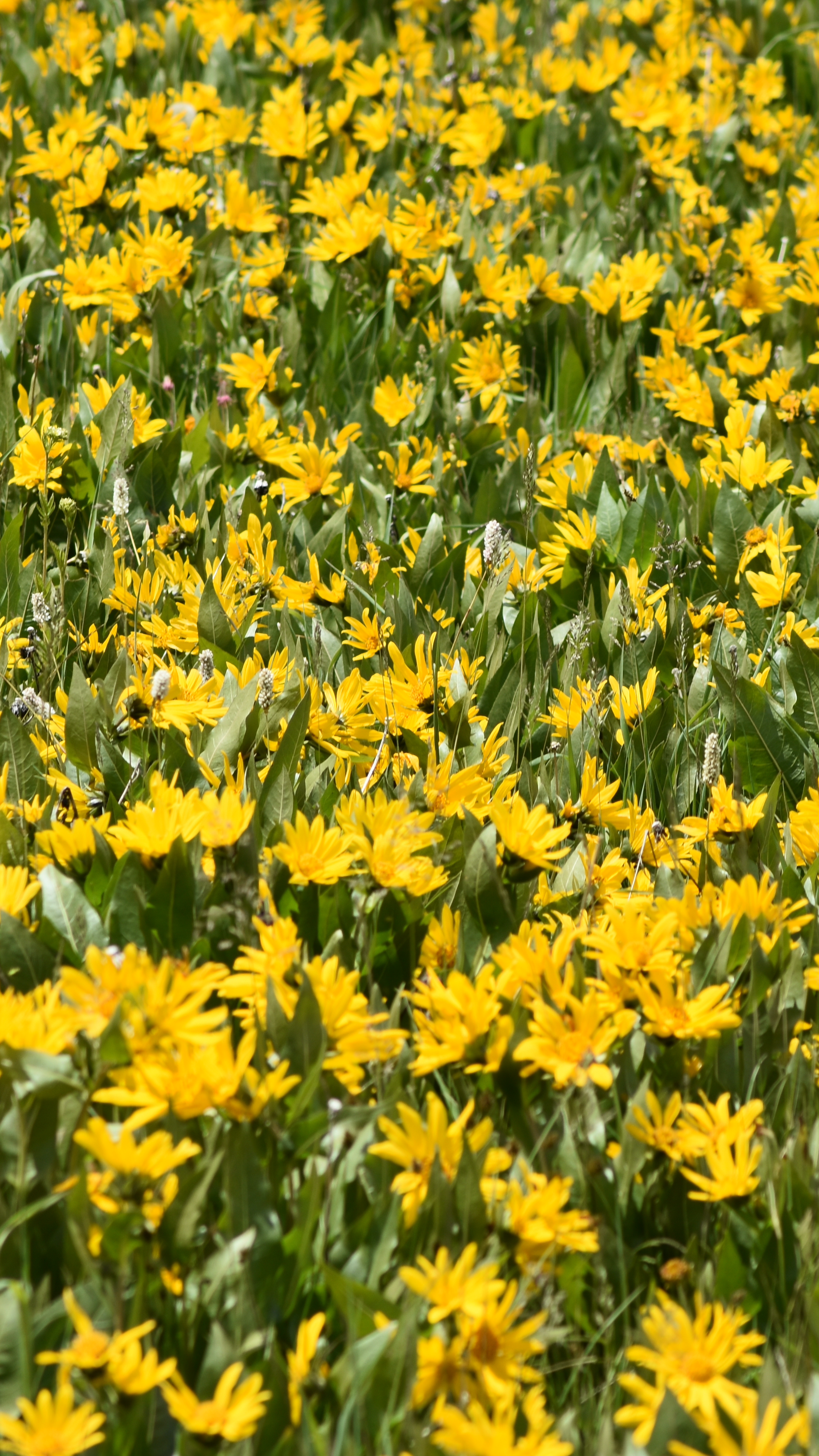
Field in bloom, Steamboat Lake State Park, Colorado

Wyethia amplexicaulis was first described and named by Thomas Nuttall in 1834 as Espeletia amplexicaulis from preserved specimens collected by Nathaniel Jarvis Wyeth in 1833. However, when he was able to observe the plant himself during an expedition in 1834 to 1835 he revised his opinion. In a lecture presented to the American Philosophical Society on 2 October 1840 he presented his new view that it belonged in genus Wyethia where he had already placed and named Wyethia helianthoides.

After Nuttall's placement of Wyethia amplexicaulis within Wyethia its classification has remained fundamentally the same. There have been some publications where some portion of W. amplexicauliswas split off as a new species or as subspecies. In 1900 Thomas J. Howell published a description of Wyethia lanceolata from the Blue Mountains of Oregon. More deliberately Charles Piper proposed creating two subspecies, Wyethia amplexicaulis subsp. major and Wyethia amplexicaulis subsp. subresinosa in 1914. Though these classification were used by botanists for a time, as of 2023 they are listed as synonyms for W. amplexicaulis in Plants of the World Online (POWO), World Flora Online (WFO), and the Flora of North America.

Table of Synonyms
Name	Year	Rank	Notes
Espeletia amplexicaulis Nutt.	1834	species	≡ hom.
Wyethia amplexicaulis subsp. major Piper	1914	subspecies	= het.
Wyethia amplexicaulis subsp. subresinosa Piper	1914	subspecies	= het.
Wyethia lanceolata Howell	1900	species	= het.
Wyethia major (Piper) Hollister, McAtee & W.W.Cooke	1914	species	= het.
Wyethia subresinosa (Piper) Hollister, McAtee & W.W.Cooke	1914	species	= het.
Notes: ≡ homotypic synonym; = heterotypic synonym

Modern genetic research confirms the placement of Wyethia amplexicaulis within a clade of the same name. Its closest relatives are Wyethia angustifolia, Wyethia helianthoides, and Wyethia longicaulis. The other five members of the clade are more closely related to each other. Wyethia glabra being closely related to Wyethia helenioides and Wyethia bolanderia, while Wyethia arizonica, and Wyethia mollis also forming a small sub group within the clade. When W. amplexicaulis crosses with W. arizonica it produces the natural hybrid Wyethia × magna which is found in the central and southern parts of the Colorado's West Slope.

=== Names ===
The genus name, Wyethia was selected by Nuttall to honor the first scientific collections of the genus by Nathaniel Wyeth. The species name, amplexicaulis, is new Latin meaning the base surrounds the stem (amplexus: to entwine or embrace + i + caulis: a stem or cabbage). Some of the common names derive from the scientific name such as "northern wyethia", "mule-ear wyethia", or simply "wyethia". Many of the common names such as "northern mule ears", "yellow mule's-ears", "mule ears", "mule-ears", or "mule ear dock" are comparing the shape of the leaves to that of a mule or mule deer. Other common names like "black sunflower" and "smooth dwarf sunflower" make reference to the general resemblance of the flowers to that of one of the most well known of the Asteraceae.

The Goshute people of Utah call Wyethia amplexicaulis pi'-a-kĕn-dzĭp in their own language. The Shoshone people living in what is now Nevada call it be-ah-kuk in their language.

== Distribution and habitat ==
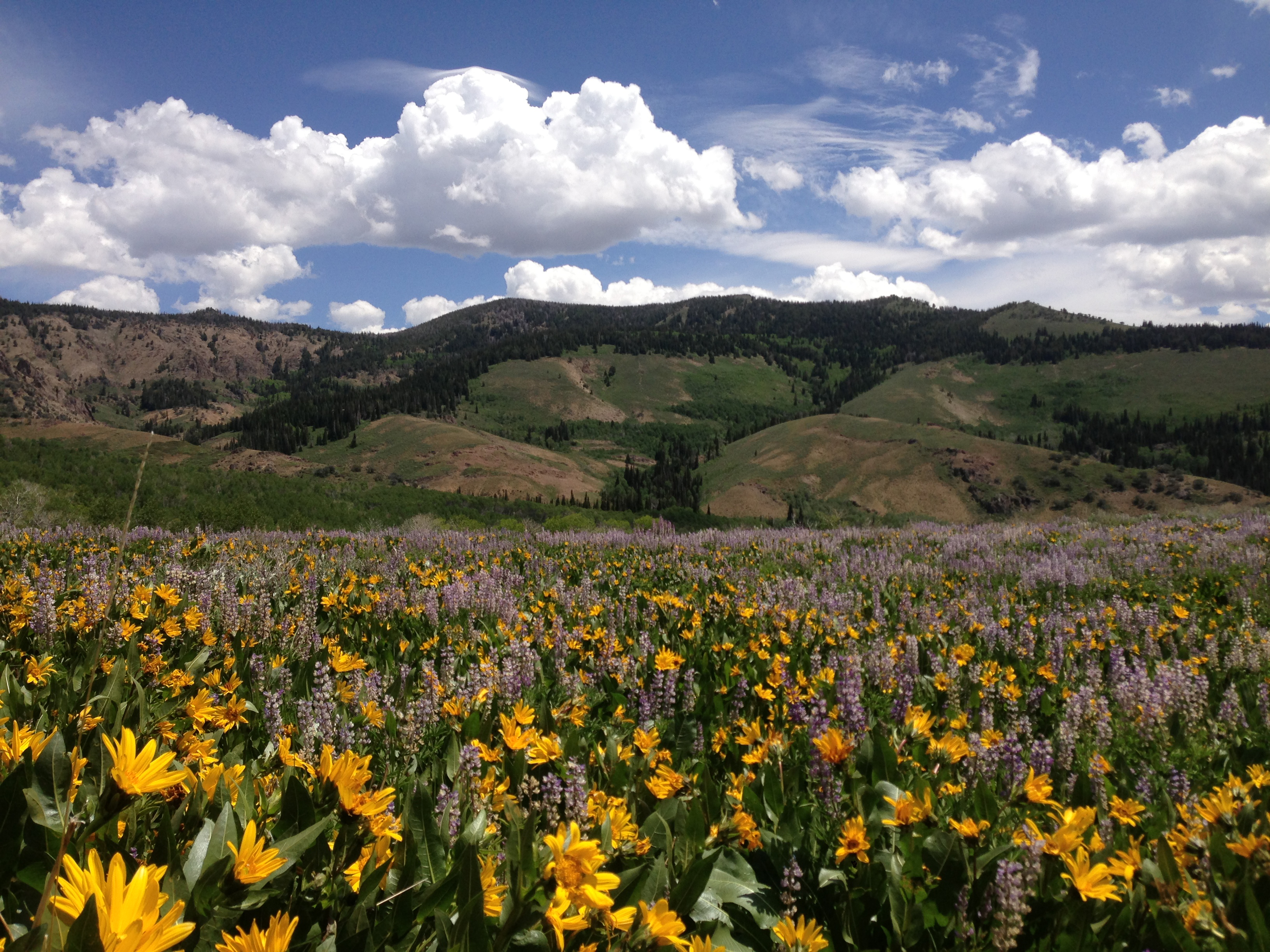
Field in bloom, Nevada

The natural range of W. amplexicaulis is from the Pacific Northwest of the United States, mostly east of the Cascade Mountains in Washington and Oregon, to the Rocky Mountains in Montana and Wyoming. It is not known to grow in Canada, though it comes close to the border in Idaho. It grows as far south as Nevada, Utah, and northern Colorado.

Wyethia amplexicaulis grow most vigorously in meadows that are at least seasonally moist, but not permanently waterlogged. They grow near shadscale, sagebrush steppe, within juniper scrublands, between and in aspen groves, and in meadows in the lower montane zone. While they will grow on many soil types, they thrive on heavier soils such as clay soil types and are more likely to dominate them. In addition they most often grow in areas that are flat or with gentle slopes.

== Ecology ==
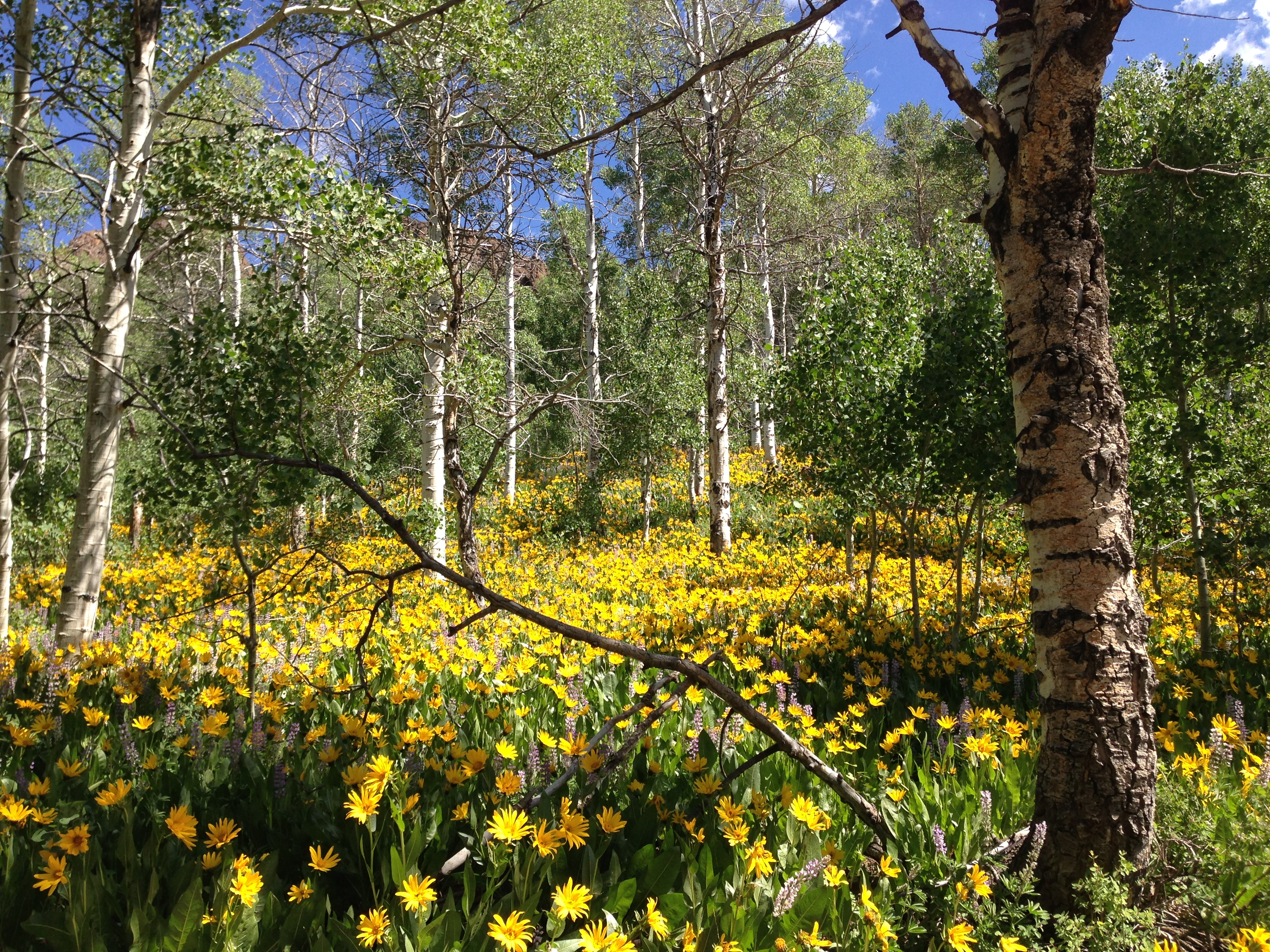
With aspens in Nevada

Wyethia amplexicaulis is often locally abundant, forming dense populations that are dominate or co-dominate with another species such as the grass Poa nevadensis. When overgrazed W. amplexicaulis will increase its cover particularly on clay soils. Once dominance is established by W. amplexicaulis due to overgrazing it is very difficult for other species to reestablish themselves. The open park like areas are a dense knee high expanse of green leaves with only a few other species scattered within it such as Lupinus species, Drymocallis glandulosa, Potentilla gracilis, and Symphoricarpos oreophilus. Wildfires also increase the number of W. amplexicaulis in the landscape in the years after the fire, though the immediate effects on plants is not yet documented.

Early in the growing season the tender young foliage of W. amplexicaulis is eaten by mule deer, though it is not preferred forage. Likewise sheep will eat their leaves in the spring and early summer. The mature leaves are coarse and dry out by mid-summer, so the plants are not much consumed later in the season. They are not much grazed by other large herbivores like cattle and elk. However, elk, deer, and all livestock eat the flower heads with apparent enjoyment. Though it is not preferred forage, there are no reported livestock losses from its consumption.

Wyethia amplexicaulis is one of many plants consumed by the insect Allorhinocoris speciosus, a true bug in the family Miridae (leaf bugs).

Galls are formed on the leaves of W. amplexicaulis by the nematode Anguillulina balsamophila. They enter developing leaves on the caudex of the plant and form galls in the leaves as they mature. Very heavily infested plants can be stunted by this.

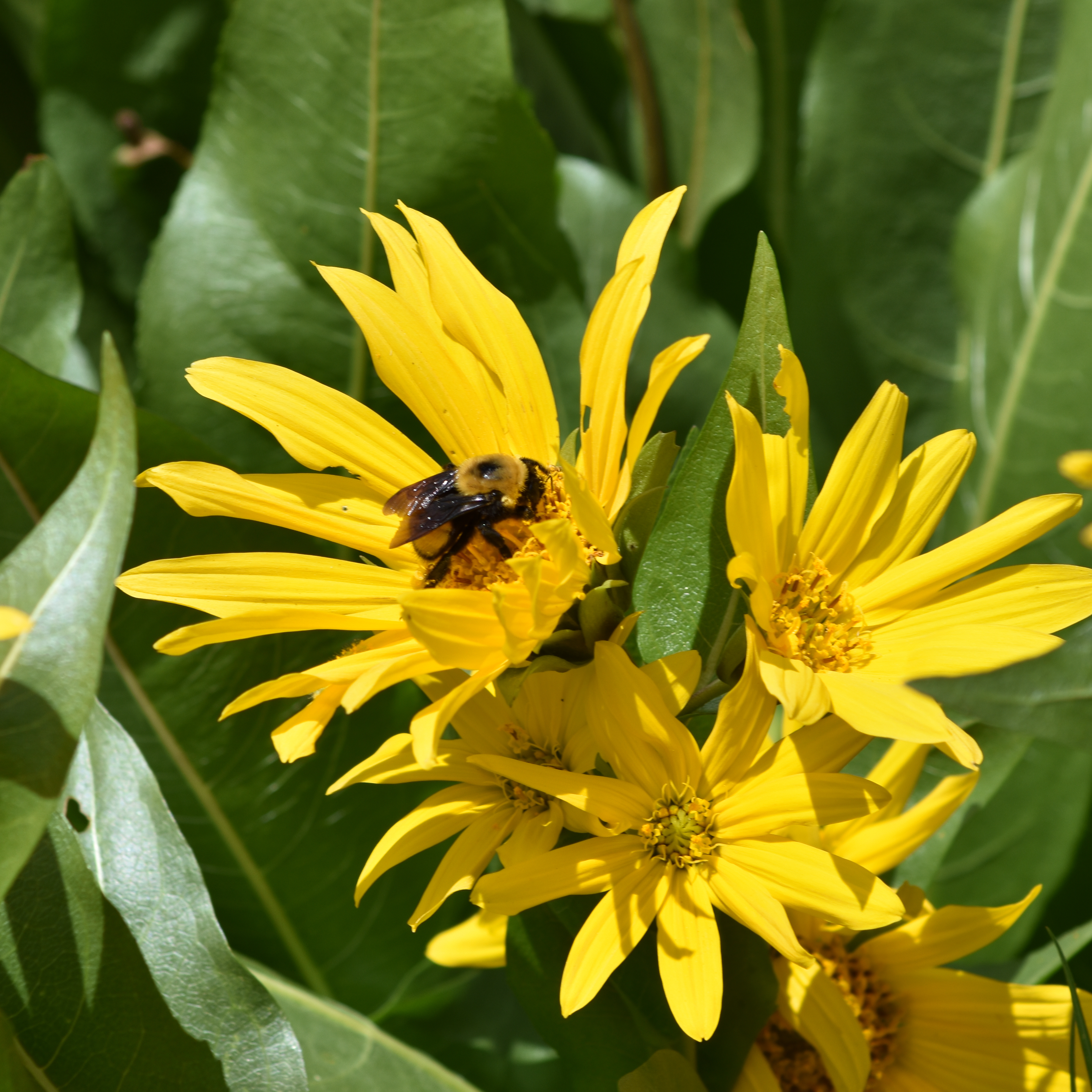
W. amplexicaulis in bloom being visited by Bombus fervidus, Colorado

=== Pollinators ===
In northern Utah the bee Osmia californica collects the majority of the pollen it needs to provision its young from just three related flowers, Balsamorhiza macrophylla, Wyethia amplexicaulis, and Helianthella uniflora. In one study conducted in the 1990s, 74.3–87.7% of the pollen collected by the bees was from these plants. Neal M. Williams hypothesizes that this specialization is much about the efficiency that the female O. californica bees have in collecting from flowers in Heliantheae as the nutritional needs can be met by other pollen from other flowers in laboratory experiments. Likewise the bee Osmia montana relies heavily on pollen collected from flowers in the family Asteraceae including W. amplexicaulis. The small carpenter bee Ceratina acantha, which is not selective in the flowers it visits, has also been recorded visiting it.

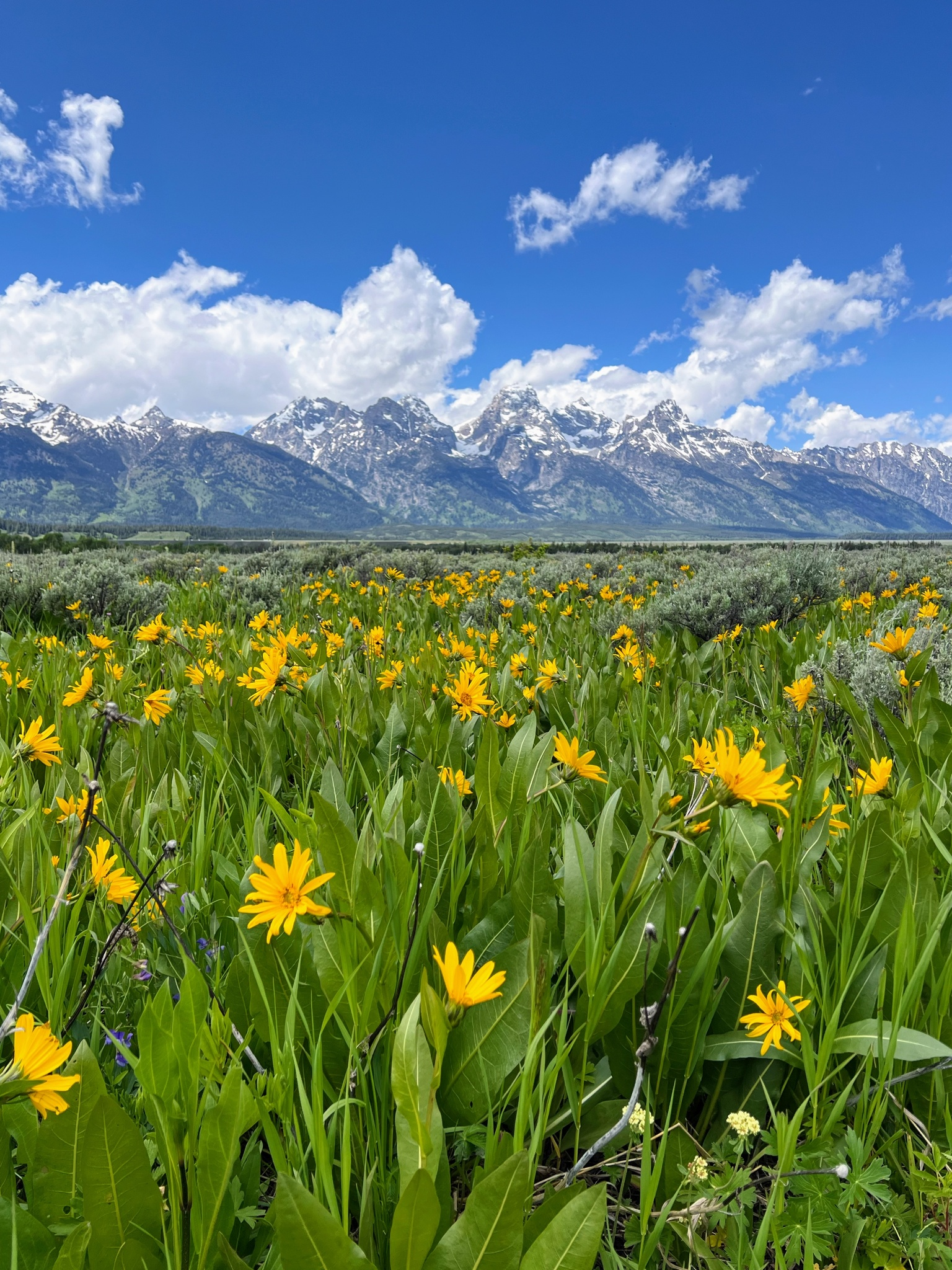
Grand Teton National Park

== Conservation ==
Wyethia amplexicaulis was evaluated by NatureServe as apparently secure (G4) in 2003. At the state level they evaluated it as "vulnerable" S3 in Wyoming, but has not yet evaluated its status for any other state as of 2023.

== Cultivation ==
Because of their showy display when massed together, northern wyethia is sometimes planted in wildflower gardens. Though they provide strong early cover and growth they tend to be planted together with other wildflowers like blue flax (Linum lewisii), blanket flower (Gaillardia pulchella), or tufted evening primrose (Oenothera caespitosa) as they are vigorous in mid to late spring, but fade in the heat of summer.

The main method of propagation for northern wyethia in gardens is the same as in the wild, seeds. The seeds require at least one month of cold, moist stratification for successful germination at temperatures below 4.5 °C (40 °F). They are planted by gardeners at an approximate depth of 6 millimeters either directly in the soil in their final location or in flats or pots. Plants in containers are moved to their planting location in the fall after a season of growth. Northern wyethia can also be propagated by root divisions in the fall or early spring before growth starts. Each piece of root must have at least one bud.

Northern wyethia performs best in somewhat heavier soils such as clay-loam with a moderate amount of moisture, however it is adaptable to many soil types including gravel. The ideal pH is 6.0–7.5, a more neutral rather than acidic or alkaline soil. It is winter hardy in USDA zones 4–8.

== Traditional uses ==
The seeds have been gathered by the Goshute people of Utah as a food source. Tightly woven baskets were traditionally used to gather the seeds from the mature flower heads by knocking the seed heads with a tool made of wood into the basket under it.
