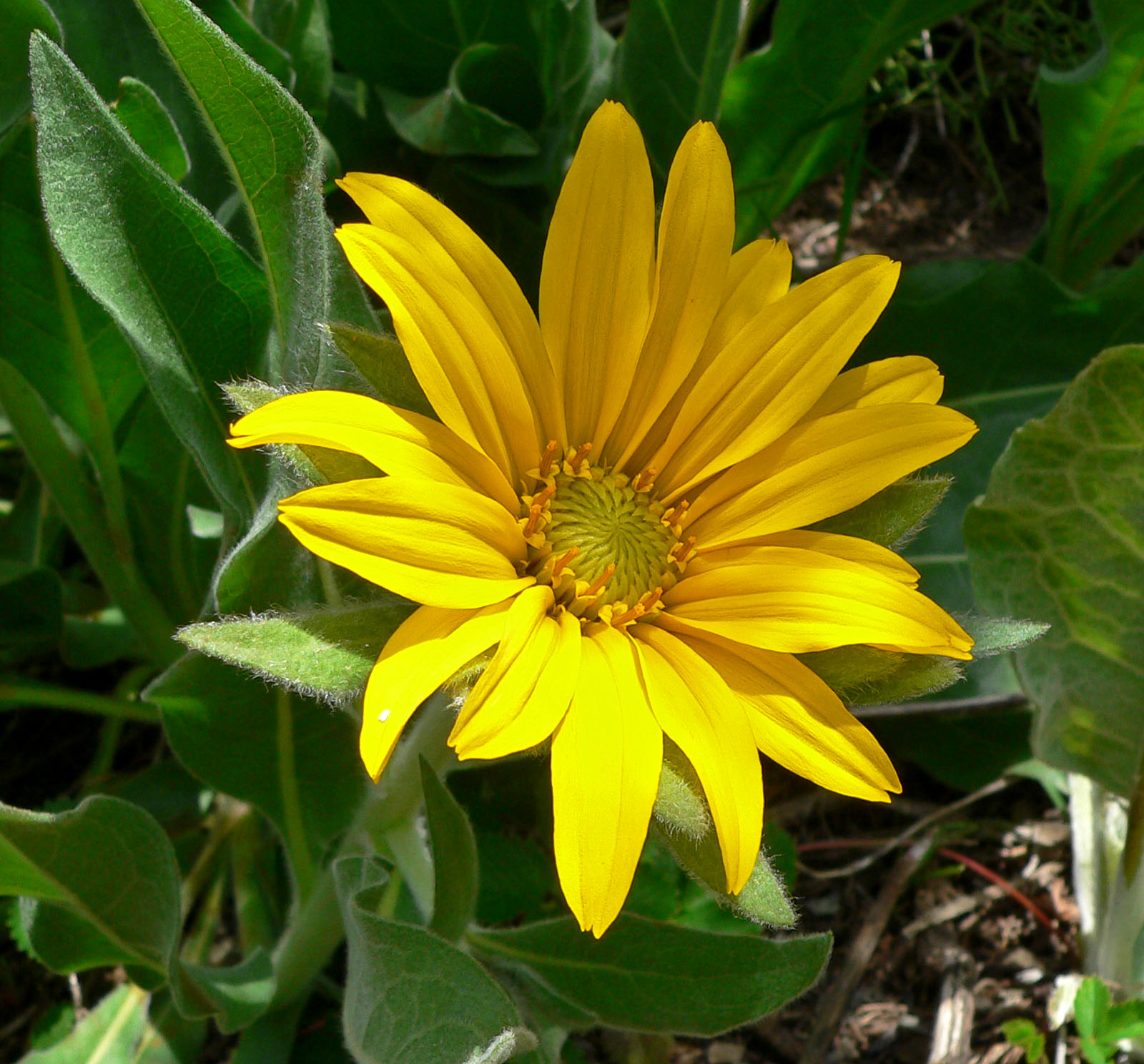
- Wyethia helenioides

Scientific classification
- Kingdom: Plantae
- Clade: Tracheophytes
- Clade: Angiosperms
- Clade: Eudicots
- Clade: Asterids
- Order: Asterales
- Family: Asteraceae
- Tribe: Heliantheae
- Subtribe: Engelmanniinae
- Genus: Wyethia; Nutt.

Type species
- Wyethia helianthoides

Synonyms
- Alarconia DC.; Espeletia Nutt.; Melarhiza Kellogg

= Wyethia =

Genus of flowering plants

Wyethia is a genus of North American flowering plants in the family Asteraceae. First published by Thomas Nuttall in J. Acad. Nat. Sci. Philadelphia vol.7 on page 39 in 1834.

These plants are commonly referred to as mule's ears. They are short, low to the ground golden-rayed wildflowers that resemble miniature sunflowers. The genus is named for an early explorer of the western United States, American Nathaniel Jarvis Wyeth, 1802–1856.

== Species ==
As accepted by Kew; and Biota of North America Program;

| Image | Name | Distribution |
|---|---|---|
| | Wyethia amplexicaulis (Nutt.) Nutt. - northern mule's ears, black sunflower | WA OR ID MT NV WY UT CO |
| | Wyethia angustifolia Nutt. - California compassplant, narrowleaf wyethia | WA OR CA |
| | Wyethia arizonica A.Gray - Arizona mule's ears | AZ NM UT CO |
| | Wyethia x cusickii Piper | OR ID NV |
| | Wyethia glabra A.Gray - Coast Range mule's ears | CA |
| | Wyethia helenioides Nutt. - gray mule's ears, whitehead mule's ears | CA |
| | Wyethia helianthoides Nutt. - sunflower mule's ears | OR ID NV WY MT |
| | Wyethia longicaulis A.Gray - Humboldt mule's ears | CA |
| | Wyethia mollis A.Gray - woolly mule's ears | CA OR NV |
| | Wyethia × magna A.Nelson ex W.A.Weber | CO NM |
| | Wyethia ovata | California, Baja California |
| | Wyethia sagittata (Pursh) Mabb. | Oregon |

formerly included;

Agnorhiza. Scabrethia and Vigethia
