= Coleophora wyethiae =

Scientific classification
- Kingdom: Animalia
- Phylum: Arthropoda
- Class: Insecta
- Order: Lepidoptera
- Family: Coleophoridae
- Genus: Coleophora
- Species: C. wyethiae

Binomial name
- Coleophora wyethiae Walsingham, 1882

Species of moth

Coleophora wyethiae is a moth of the family Coleophoridae. It is found in the United States, including California.

The larvae feed on the leaves of Wyethia angustifolia, Aster and Balsamorhiza species. They create an annulate case.
