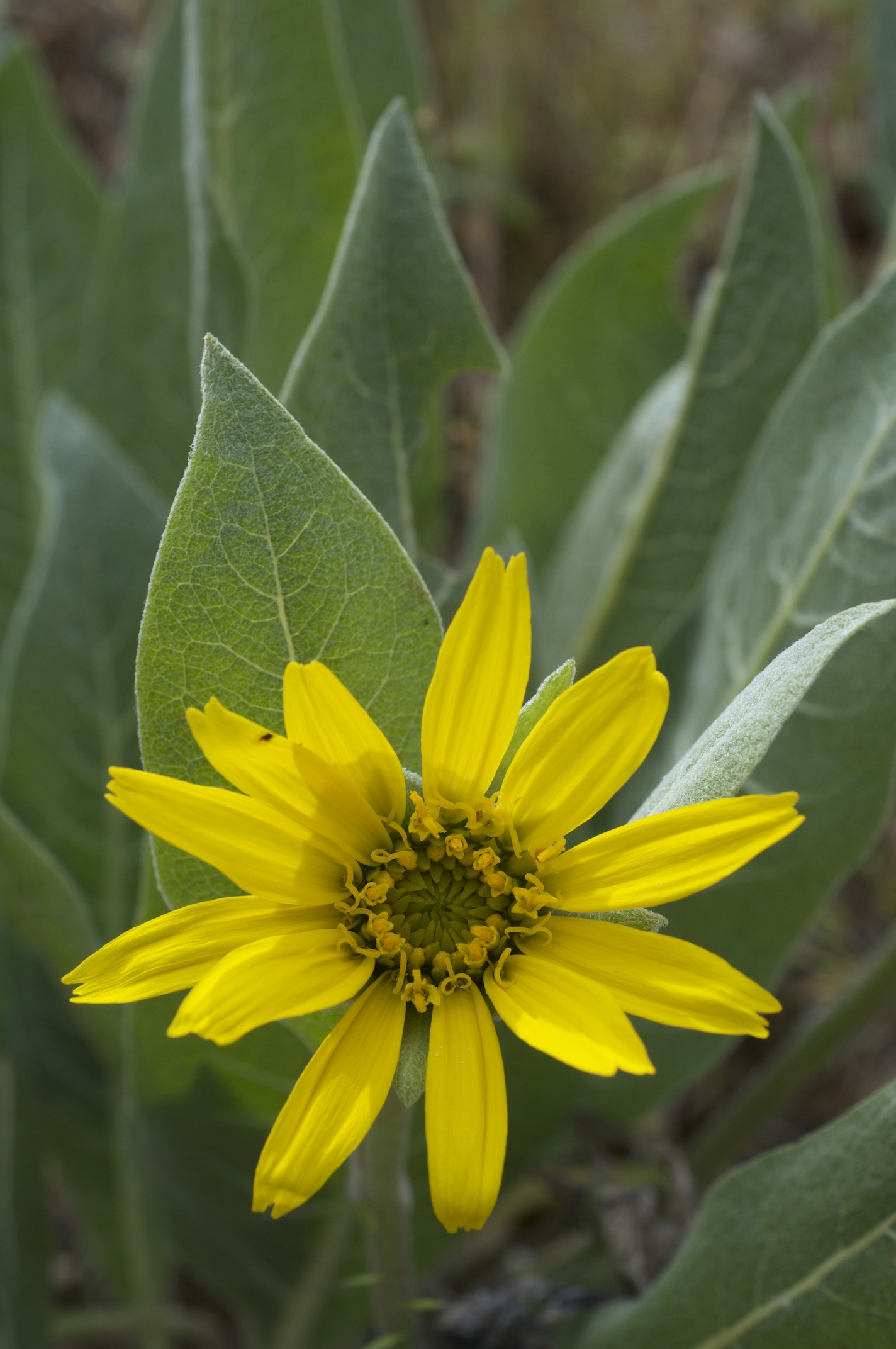

Conservation status
- Secure (NatureServe)

Scientific classification
- Kingdom: Plantae
- Clade: Tracheophytes
- Clade: Angiosperms
- Clade: Eudicots
- Clade: Asterids
- Order: Asterales
- Family: Asteraceae
- Genus: Wyethia
- Species: W. helenioides

Binomial name
- Wyethia helenioides (DC.) Nutt.

Synonyms
- Alarconia helenioides DC.; Melarhiza inuloides Kellogg

= Wyethia helenioides =

Species of flowering plant

Wyethia helenioides is a species of flowering plants in the family Asteraceae commonly referred to as gray mule's ears or whitehead mule-ears.

== Distribution ==
This species occurs chiefly in the California Coast Ranges, Transverse Ranges, Peninsular Ranges, and some areas of the Sierra Nevada foothills in California.

== Description ==
Wyethia helenioides is a short, low growing golden-rayed wildflower, that resemble sunflowers. Typical understory associates in sunny clearings of mixed oak forests in coastal California include Mimulus aurantiacus and Calochortus luteus.
