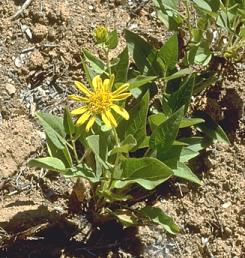

Conservation status
- Imperiled (NatureServe)

Scientific classification
- Kingdom: Plantae
- Clade: Embryophytes
- Clade: Tracheophytes
- Clade: Angiosperms
- Clade: Eudicots
- Clade: Asterids
- Order: Asterales
- Family: Asteraceae
- Tribe: Heliantheae
- Genus: Agnorhiza
- Species: A. reticulata

Binomial name
- Agnorhiza reticulata (Greene) W.A.Weber

Synonyms
- Wyethia reticulata Greene

= Agnorhiza reticulata =

Species of flowering plant

Agnorhiza reticulata (syn. Wyethia reticulata), known by the common name El Dorado County mule's ears, is a rare species of flowering plant found only in a small region of north-central California.

Agnorhiza reticulata grows in the California interior chaparral and woodlands habitats of the Sierra Nevada foothills. It has been found in El Dorado, Sacramento, and Yuba Counties.

The genetic diversity of the populations is probably low because they are often clonal, spreading via vegetative reproduction with rhizomes rather than sexual reproduction by seed. Some populations are also threatened by development of their habitat.

== Description ==
Agnorhiza reticulata is a perennial herb producing a hairy, glandular, sticky-textured stem growing 40 to 70 centimeters tall, at times reaching 1 meter (3 ft.). The leaves have triangular or lance-shaped blades up to 15 centimeters long.

The inflorescence is a usually solitary sunflowerlike flower head with up to 21 yellow ray florets measuring up to 2.5 centimeters long. At the center are yellow disc florets. The flowers are pollinated by native bees.

The fruit is an achene a few millimeters long which usually lacks a pappus.
