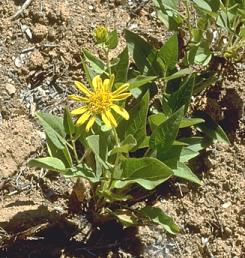
- Agnorhiza reticulata

Scientific classification
- Kingdom: Plantae
- Clade: Embryophytes
- Clade: Tracheophytes
- Clade: Angiosperms
- Clade: Eudicots
- Clade: Asterids
- Order: Asterales
- Family: Asteraceae
- Subfamily: Asteroideae
- Tribe: Heliantheae
- Subtribe: Engelmanniinae
- Genus: Agnorhiza (Jeps.) W.A.Weber

Synonyms
- Balsamorhiza sect. Agnorhiza Jeps.; Wyethia sect. Agnorhiza (Jeps.) W.A. Weber

= Agnorhiza =

Genus of flowering plants

Agnorhiza is a small genus of flowering plants in the family Asteraceae described as a genus in 1998. Its species had previously been considered members of either Wyethia or Balsamorhiza. The plants are native to California, with the range of one species (A. ovata) extending into northern Mexico. They are perennial herbs with sunflower-like flower heads 1 to 4 centimeters wide.

Species

- Agnorhiza bolanderi - Bolander's mule's ears
- Agnorhiza elata - Hall's mule's ears
- Agnorhiza invenusta - Coville's mule's ears
- Agnorhiza ovata - southern mule's ears
- Agnorhiza reticulata - El Dorado mule's ears
