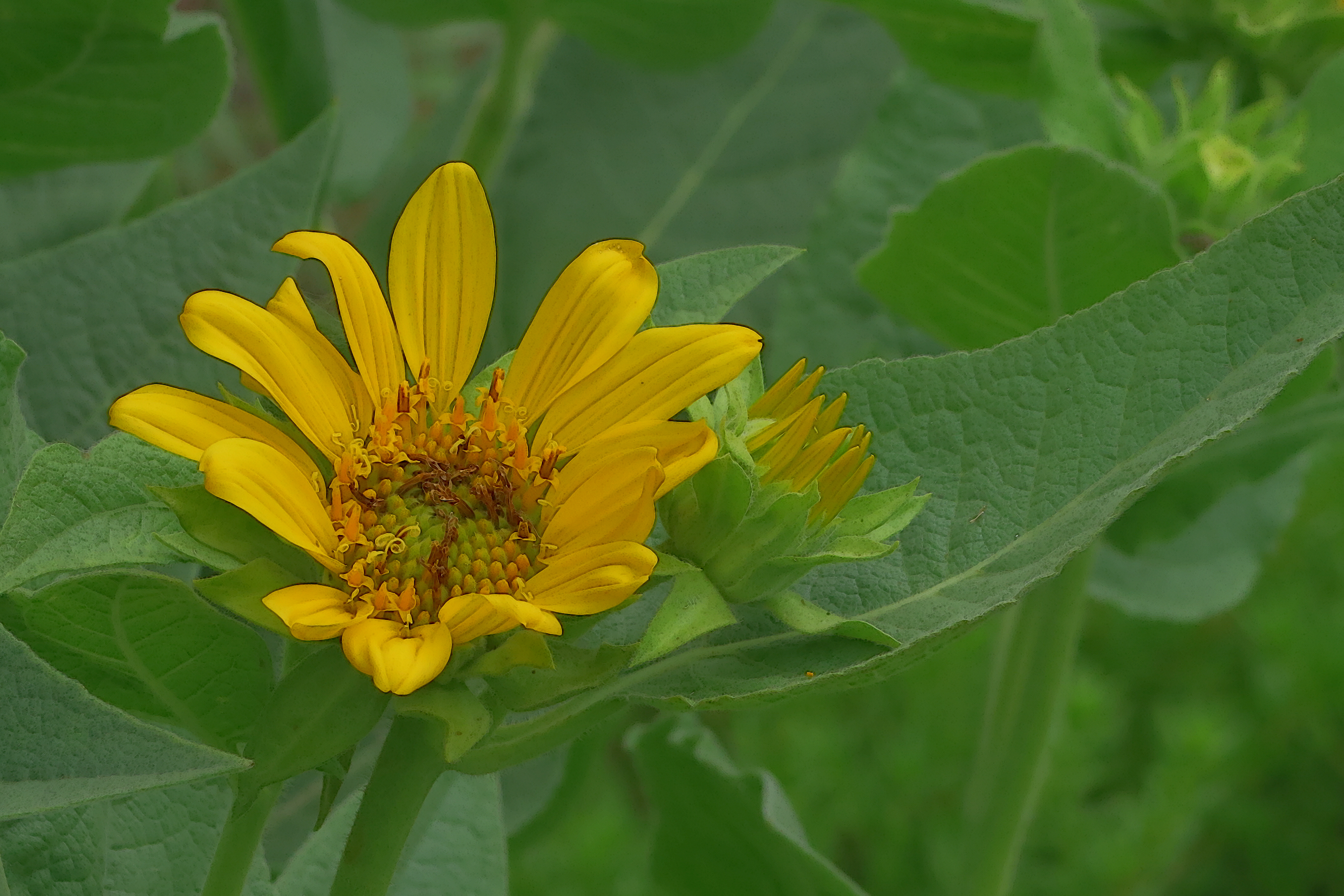

Conservation status
- Apparently Secure (NatureServe)

Scientific classification
- Kingdom: Plantae
- Clade: Tracheophytes
- Clade: Angiosperms
- Clade: Eudicots
- Clade: Asterids
- Order: Asterales
- Family: Asteraceae
- Tribe: Heliantheae
- Genus: Agnorhiza
- Species: A. elata

Binomial name
- Agnorhiza elata (H.M.Hall) W.A.Weber

Synonyms
- Wyethia elata H.M.Hall

= Agnorhiza elata =

Species of flowering plant

Agnorhiza elata (syn. Wyethia elata) is a species of flowering plants known by the common name Hall's mule's ears. It is endemic to California, where it is known only from a section of the central Sierra Nevada foothills. It occurs primarily in a region stretching from Tuolumne County to Fresno County, but a few isolated populations have been found in Tulare County and Santa Clara County.

== Description ==
Agnorhiza elata occurs in woodlands and pine forests. It is a perennial herb growing from a thick taproot and caudex unit. The hairy stem grows erect to a maximum height around one meter. The leaves have triangular blades up to 20 centimeters long. They are coated in woolly hairs and resin glands, and the edges are smooth or slightly serrated. The inflorescence is made up of one or more flower heads. The head has lance-shaped phyllaries and has up to 20 yellow ray florets which can be up to 6 centimeters long. The fruit is an achene over a centimeter long tipped with a pappus.
