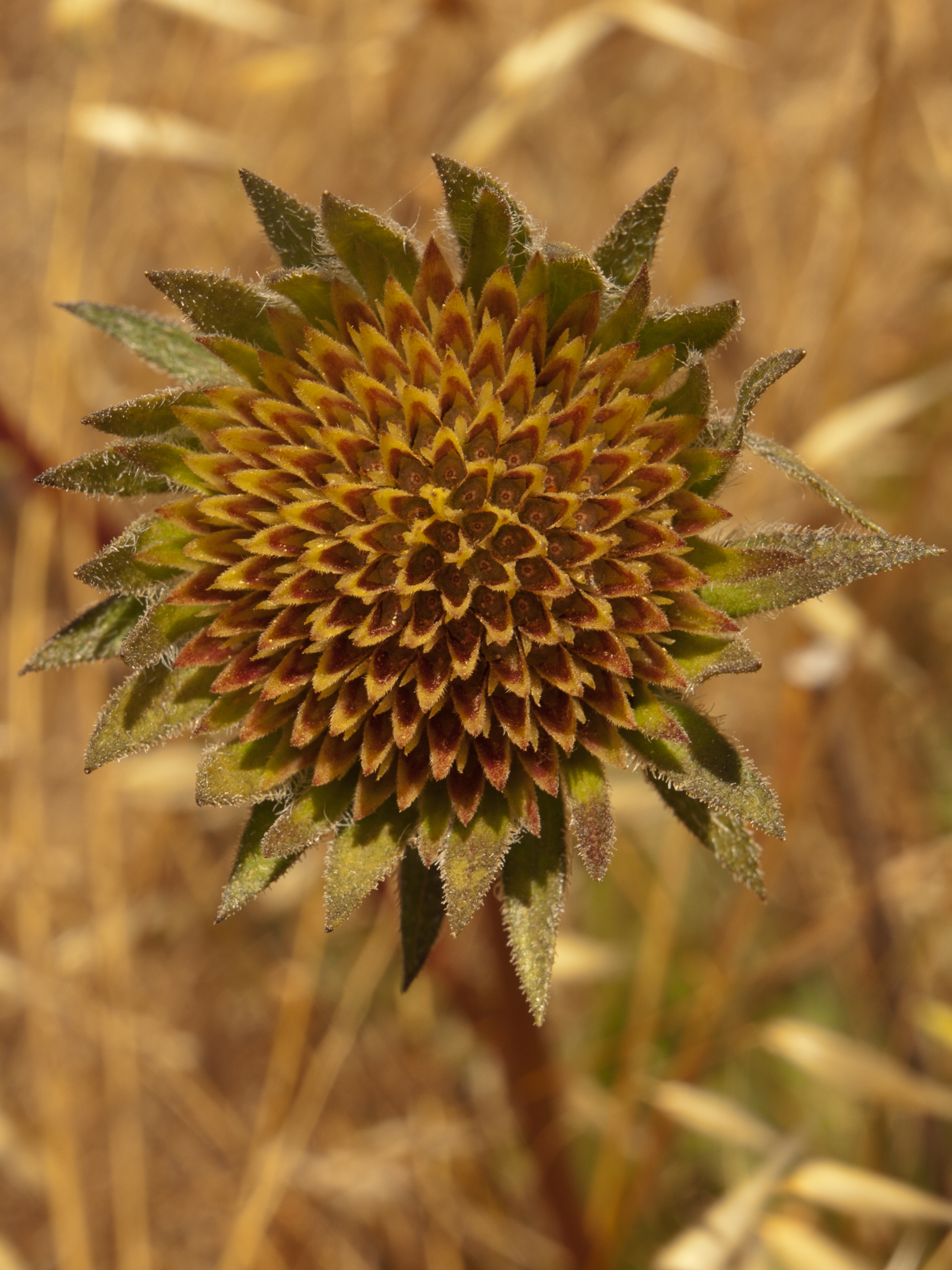

Conservation status
- Apparently Secure (NatureServe)

Scientific classification
- Kingdom: Plantae
- Clade: Tracheophytes
- Clade: Angiosperms
- Clade: Eudicots
- Clade: Asterids
- Order: Asterales
- Family: Asteraceae
- Tribe: Heliantheae
- Genus: Wyethia
- Species: W. glabra

Binomial name
- Wyethia glabra A.Gray

= Wyethia glabra =

Species of flowering plant

Wyethia glabra is a species of flowering plant in the family Asteraceae known by the common name Coast Range mule's ears. It is endemic to California, where it grows in the North and Central Coast Ranges. It is a perennial herb growing from a tough taproot and caudex unit and producing a stem up to 40 centimeters tall. It is hairless to hairy and glandular. The leaves have lance-shaped or oval blades up to 45 centimeters long. The inflorescence is usually a solitary flower head or occasionally a cluster of 2 or more. The head has lance-shaped leaflike phyllaries at the base. It contains up to 21 yellow ray florets each up to 5 centimeters long and many yellow disc florets. The fruit is an achene over a centimeter long, including its pappus.

Plant

Flower

Seeds

Seed
