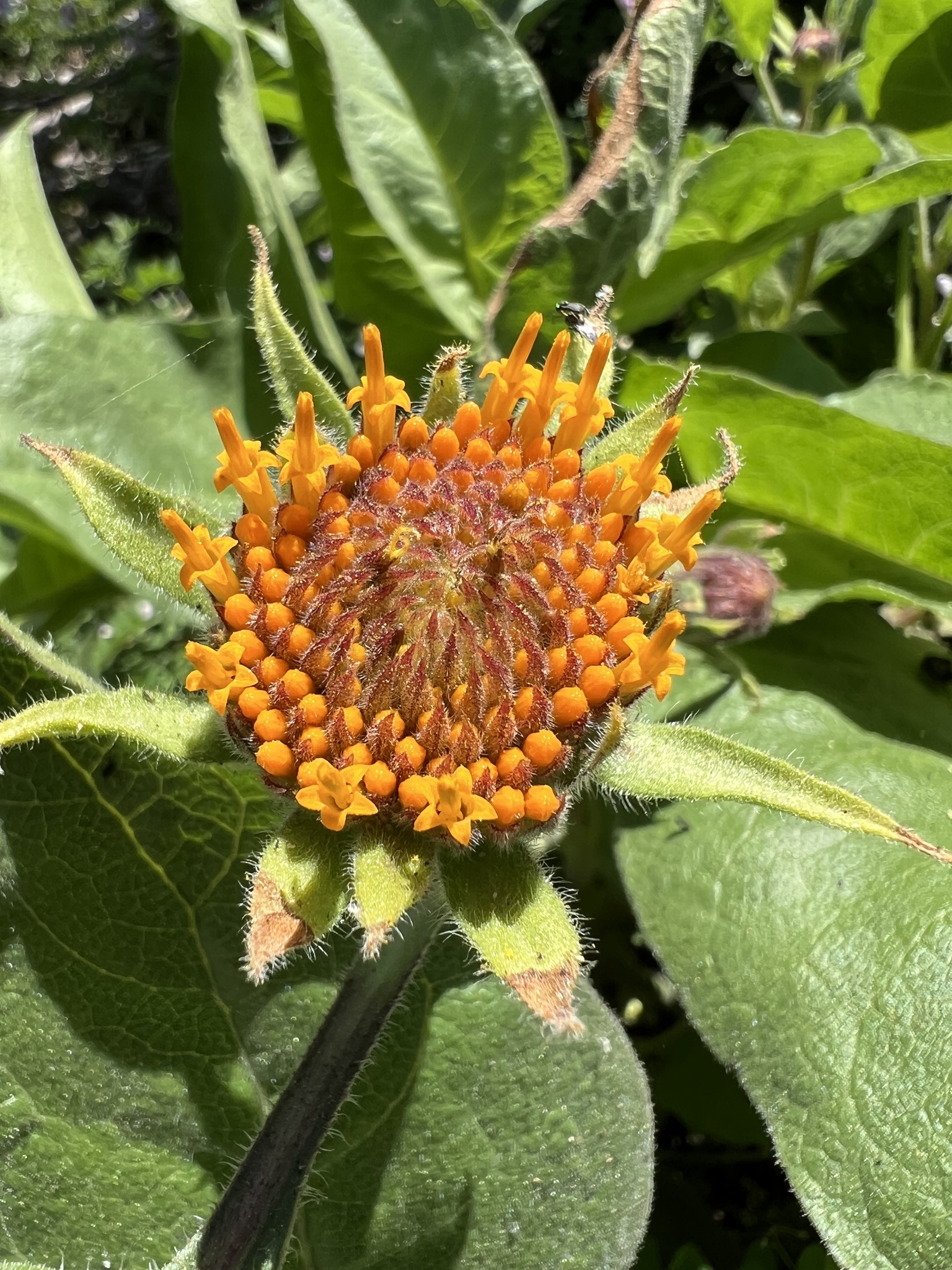

Conservation status
- Vulnerable (NatureServe)

Scientific classification
- Kingdom: Plantae
- Clade: Tracheophytes
- Clade: Angiosperms
- Clade: Eudicots
- Clade: Asterids
- Order: Asterales
- Family: Asteraceae
- Tribe: Heliantheae
- Genus: Agnorhiza
- Species: A. invenusta

Binomial name
- Agnorhiza invenusta (Greene) W.A.Weber

Synonyms
- Balsamorhiza invenusta (Greene) Coville; Helianthus invenustus Greene; Wyethia invenusta (Greene) W.A.Weber

= Agnorhiza invenusta =

Species of flowering plant

Agnorhiza invenusta (syn. Wyethia invenusta) is a species of flowering plant known by the common names Coville's mule's ears and rayless mule's ears. It is found only in California, where it grows in the Sierra Nevada foothills as in Fresno, Tulare, and Kern Counties.

Agnorhiza invenusta is a perennial herb growing from a thick taproot and caudex unit. The hairy, glandular stem grows up to a meter tall. The leaves have triangular or oval blades, up to 15 to 20 centimeters (5.9 to 7.9 in) long. The inflorescence is made up of one or more flower heads. The head has lance-shaped phyllaries which may be more than 3 centimeters (1.2 in) long.

The plant usually does not have ray florets, but there may be 2 or 3. The fruit is an achene nearly a centimeter long with no pappus.
