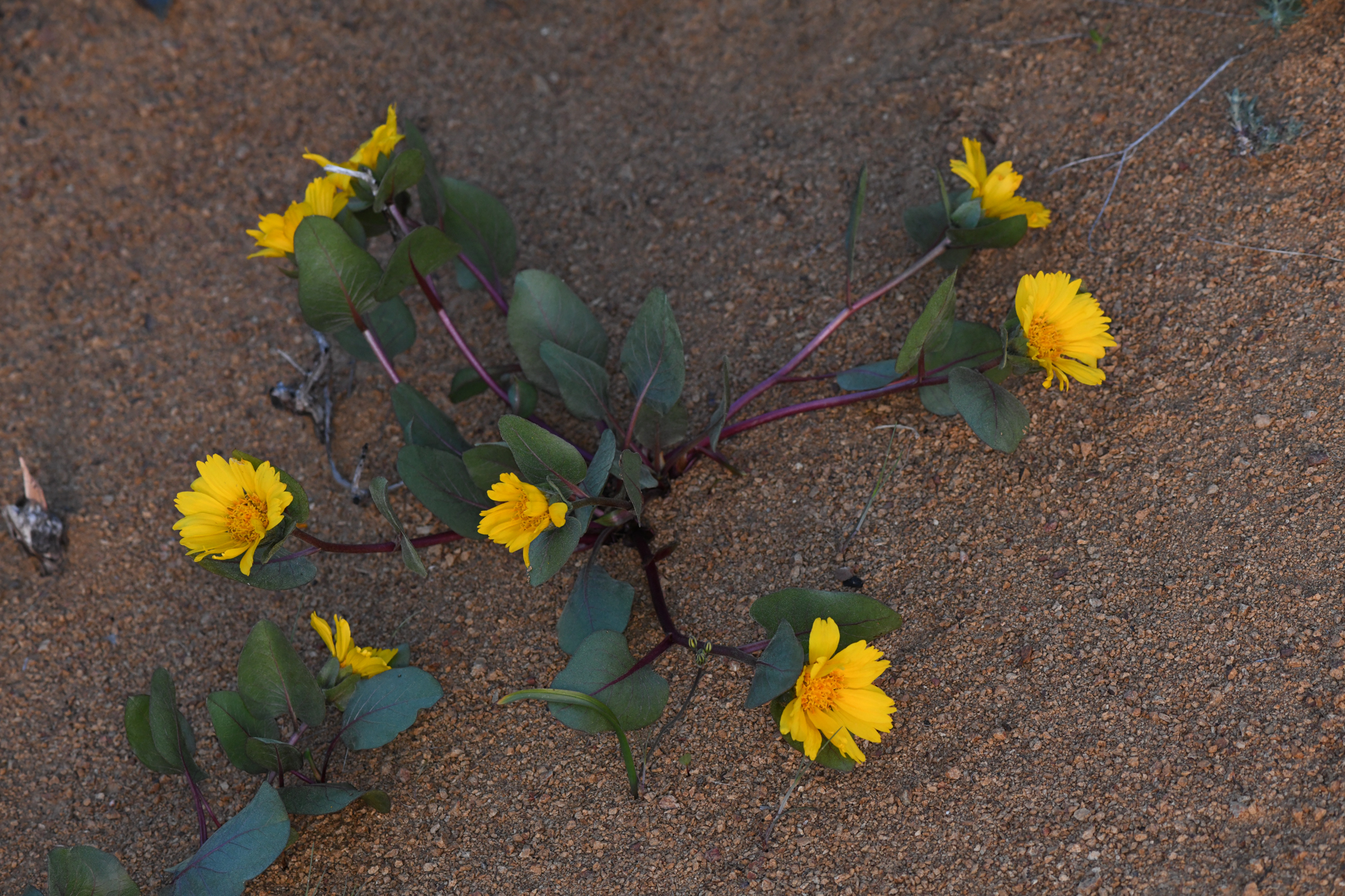

Conservation status
- Vulnerable (NatureServe)

Scientific classification
- Kingdom: Plantae
- Clade: Embryophytes
- Clade: Tracheophytes
- Clade: Angiosperms
- Clade: Eudicots
- Clade: Asterids
- Order: Asterales
- Family: Asteraceae
- Tribe: Heliantheae
- Genus: Agnorhiza
- Species: A. bolanderi

Binomial name
- Agnorhiza bolanderi (A.Gray) W.A.Weber

Synonyms
- Balsamorhiza bolanderi A.Gray; Wyethia bolanderi (A.Gray) W.A.Weber

= Agnorhiza bolanderi =

Species of flowering plant

Agnorhiza bolanderi is a species of flowering plant known by the common name Bolander's mule's ears. It is endemic to California, where it is known only from a narrow section of the Sierra Nevada foothills about 275 kilometers long from Shasta County to Mariposa County. It grows in chaparral and grassland habitat, usually on serpentine soils.

== Description ==
Agnorhiza bolanderi is a perennial herb growing from a thick taproot and caudex unit. This underground stem part helps it survive wildfire, which is common in its chaparral habitat. The aboveground stem grows up to 30 centimeters long. It is glandular and sticky in texture. The leaves have oval blades up to 12 centimeters long. The inflorescence is a solitary bell-shaped, sunflower-like flower head sometimes tucked amongst the uppermost leaves. The head contains about 13 yellow ray florets which may be 2 to 3 centimeters long or more. At the center are yellow disc florets. The fruit is an achene about 7 millimeters long which does not have a pappus.

The species is named for German-American botanist Henry Nicholas Bolander, 1831–1897.
