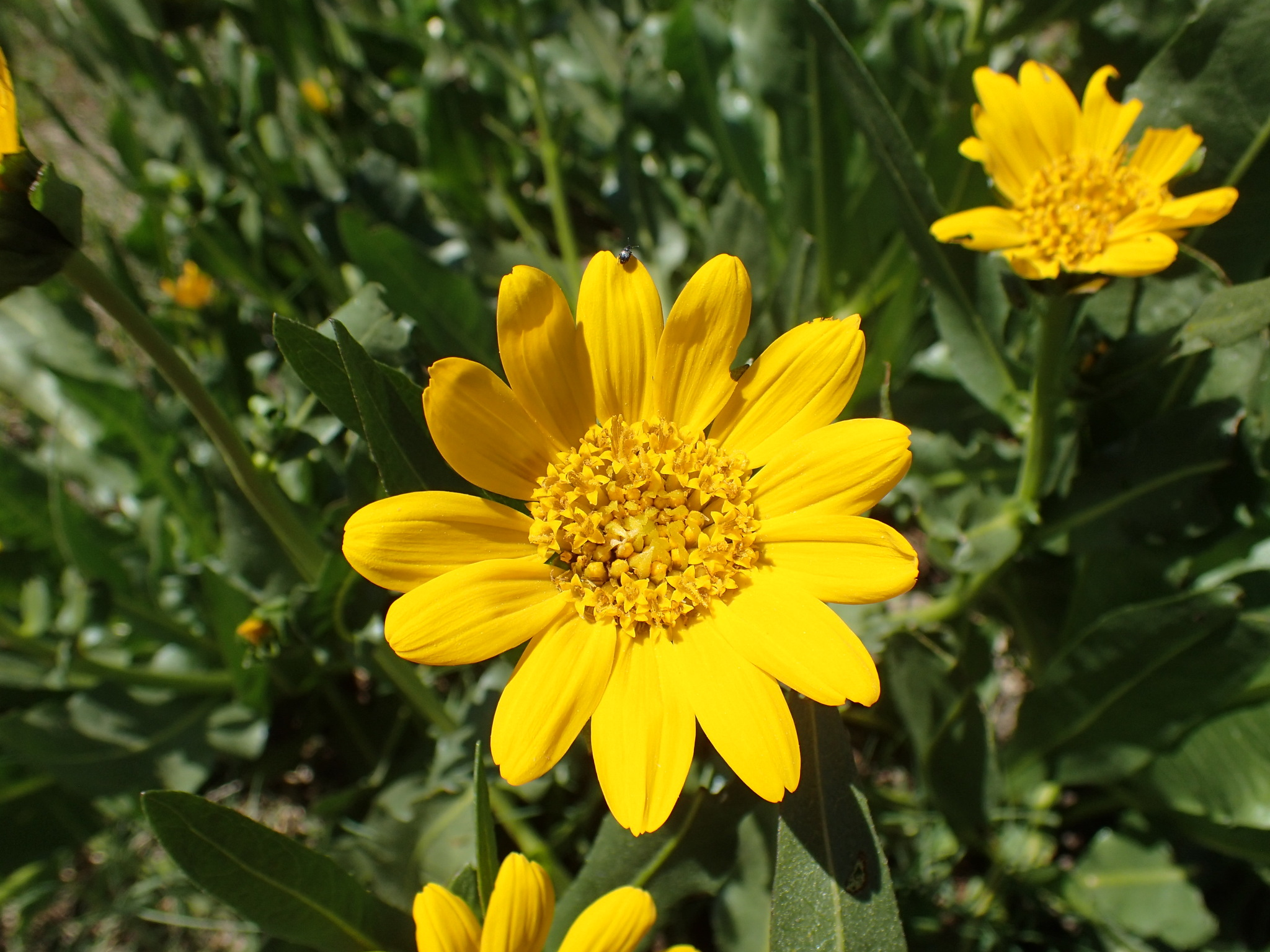

Conservation status
- Apparently Secure (NatureServe)

Scientific classification
- Kingdom: Plantae
- Clade: Embryophytes
- Clade: Tracheophytes
- Clade: Spermatophytes
- Clade: Angiosperms
- Clade: Eudicots
- Clade: Asterids
- Order: Asterales
- Family: Asteraceae
- Tribe: Heliantheae
- Genus: Wyethia
- Species: W. longicaulis

Binomial name
- Wyethia longicaulis A.Gray

= Wyethia longicaulis =

Species of flowering plant

Wyethia longicaulis is a species of flowering plant in the family Asteraceae known by the common name Humboldt mule's ears. It is endemic to California, where it occurs in the North Coast Ranges and the Klamath Mountains. It grows in mountain and foothill habitat such as grassland and forests. It is a perennial herb growing from a tough taproot and caudex unit and producing a stem up to half a meter tall. It is hairless to hairy and glandular. The leaves have lance-shaped or oblong blades up to 20 centimeters long. They are glandular and have a waxy exudate that dries white. The inflorescence is usually a cluster of 2 to 4 flower heads, each with up to 10 yellow ray florets which may be up to 3 centimeters long. The fruit is an achene about a centimeter long, including its tiny pappus.
