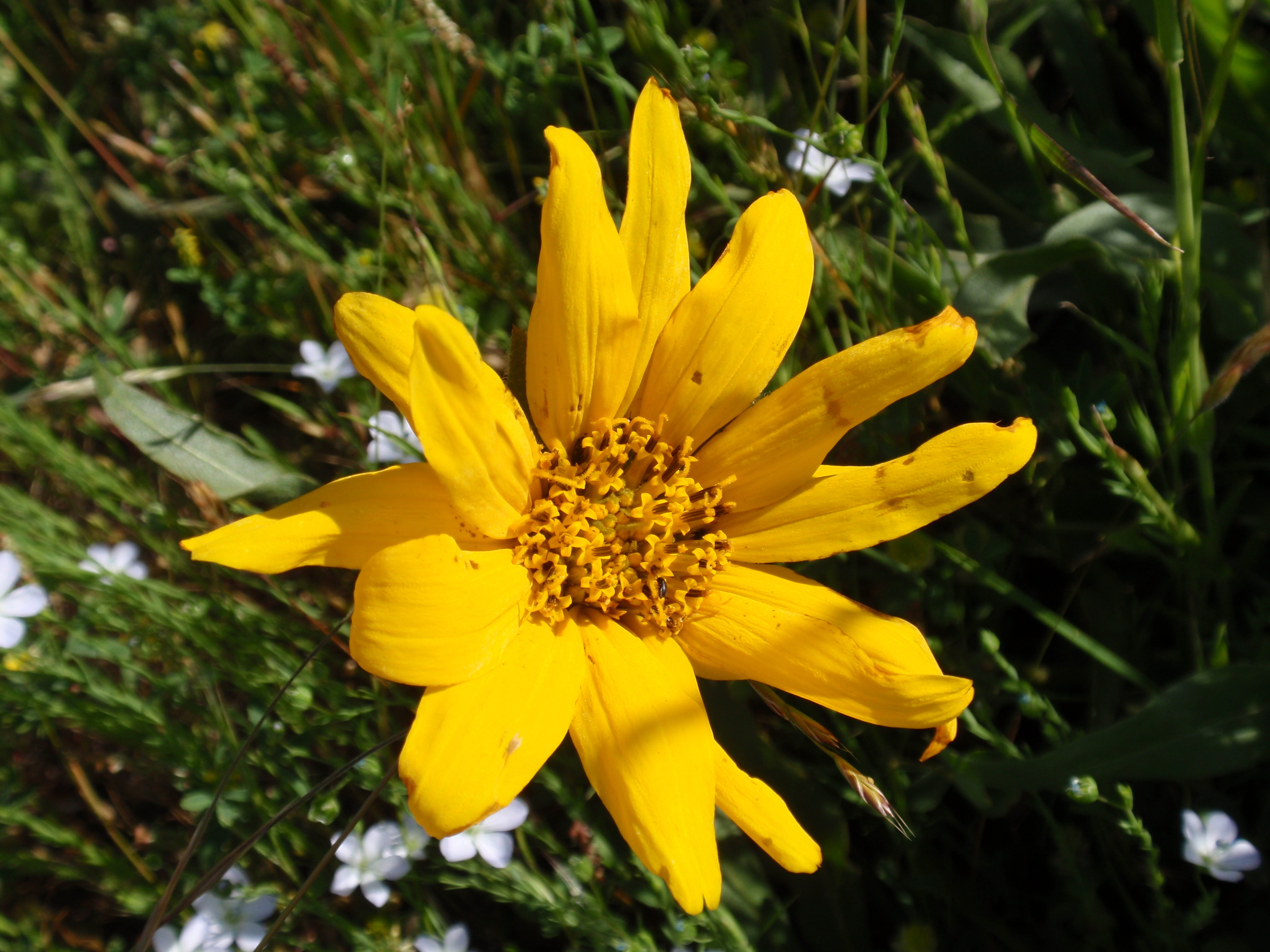

Conservation status
- Apparently Secure (NatureServe)

Scientific classification
- Kingdom: Plantae
- Clade: Tracheophytes
- Clade: Angiosperms
- Clade: Eudicots
- Clade: Asterids
- Order: Asterales
- Family: Asteraceae
- Genus: Wyethia
- Species: W. angustifolia

Binomial name
- Wyethia angustifolia (DC.) Nutt.

Synonyms
- Alarconia angustifolia DC.; Helianthus hookerianus DC.; Helianthus longifolius Hook.; Leighia hookeriana Nutt.; Wyethia angustifolia var. foliosa H.M.Hall; Wyethia angustifolia var. solanensis Jeps.; Wyethia foliosa Congdon; Wyethia robusta Nutt.

= Wyethia angustifolia =

Species of flowering plant

Wyethia angustifolia is a species of flowering plant in the family Asteraceae known by the common names California compassplant and narrowleaf mule's ears. It is native to the west coast of the United States from Washington to California, where it grows in grassland, meadows, and other open habitat. It is a perennial herb growing from a tough taproot and caudex unit and producing a stem 30 to 90 centimeters tall. The leaves have lance-shaped blades up to 50 centimeters tall. The inflorescence produces one or more large sunflower-like flower heads at the top of the hairy stem. The head has narrow, hairy phyllaries at the base. It contains up to 21 yellow ray florets each up to 4.5 centimeters long and many yellow disc florets. The fruit is an achene which may be nearly 2 centimeters long including its pappus.
