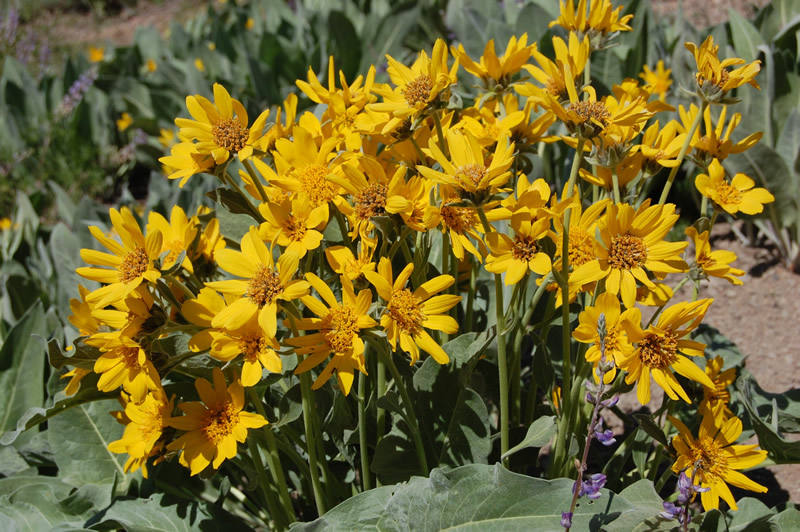

Conservation status
- Secure (NatureServe)

Scientific classification
- Kingdom: Plantae
- Clade: Tracheophytes
- Clade: Angiosperms
- Clade: Eudicots
- Clade: Asterids
- Order: Asterales
- Family: Asteraceae
- Genus: Wyethia
- Species: W. mollis

Binomial name
- Wyethia mollis A.Gray

= Wyethia mollis =

Species of flowering plant

Wyethia mollis is a species of flowering plant in the family Asteraceae known by the common name woolly mule's ears. The plant is hairy to woolly in texture, sometimes losing its hairs with age.

Wyethia mollis is a coarse perennial herb native to the mountains of northern California, especially on the east side of the Sierra Nevada, and southeastern Oregon and western Nevada. It grows in forests and other mountain habitat such as dry open meadows with sagebrush. It grows from a tough taproot and caudex unit, producing a stem 30 to 40 centimeters tall, and reaching a meter in height at times. It thrives in volcanic soils because of its deep roots.

The leaves have lance-shaped or oval blades up to 40 centimeters long, which are glandular and coated in woolly hairs, especially when new. They usually grow up vertically from the base. The inflorescence is a solitary flower head or a cluster of 2 or 3 heads, each with up to 11 yellow ray florets which may be up to 4.5 centimeters long. The fruit is an achene about a centimeter long, not counting its pappus. The seeds are edible and taste similar to sunflower seeds.

== Gallery ==
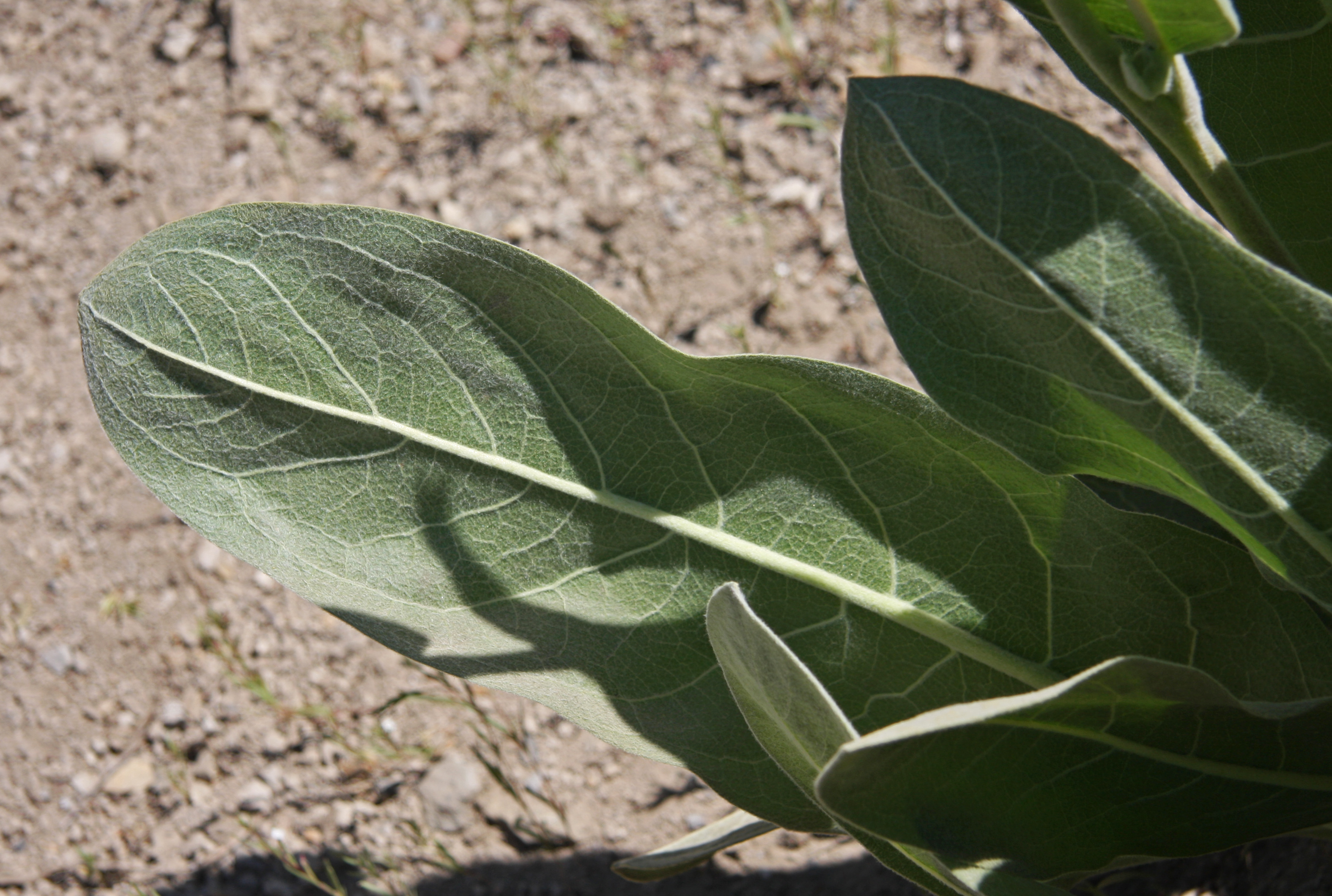
Leaf

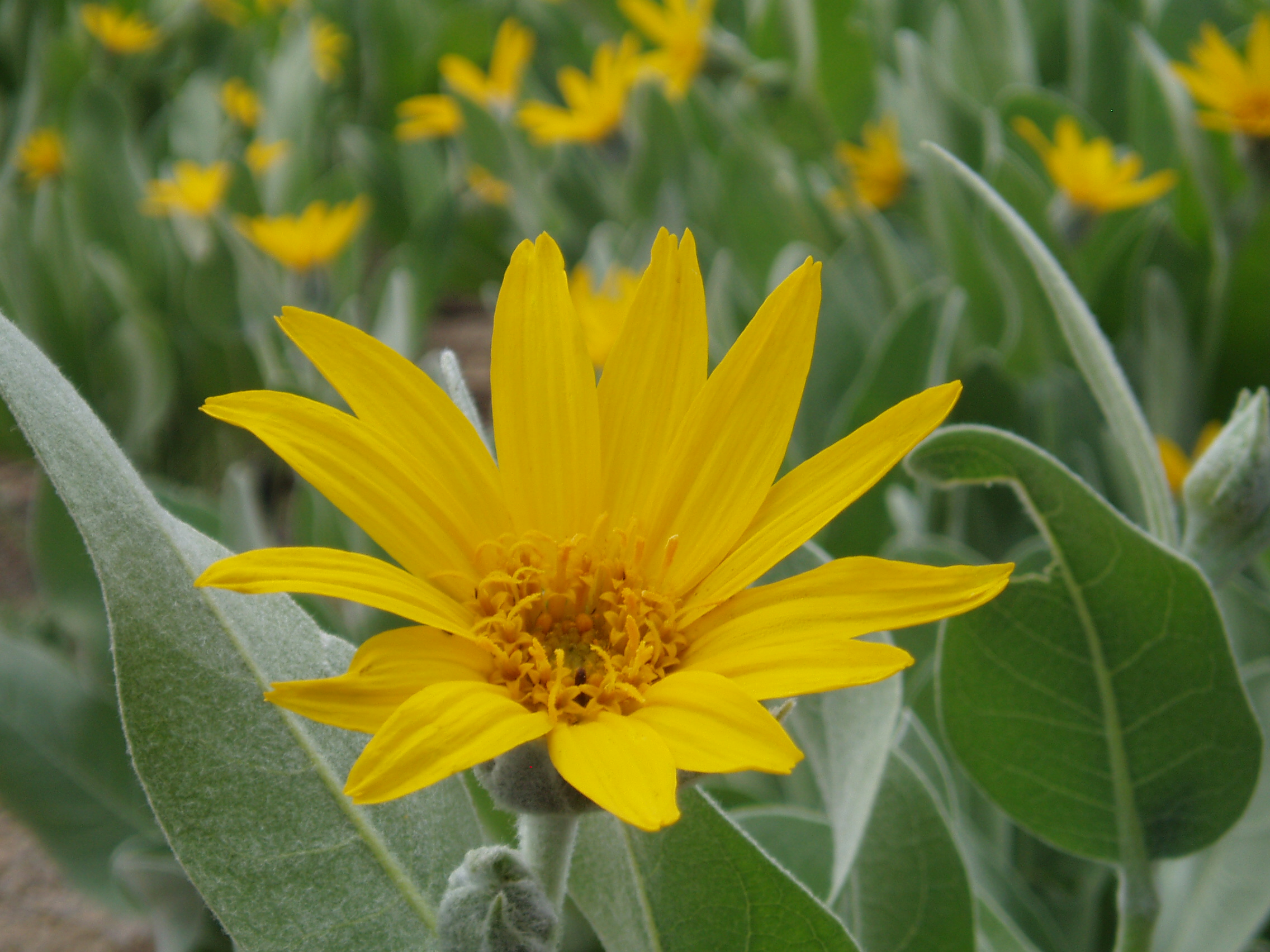
Head

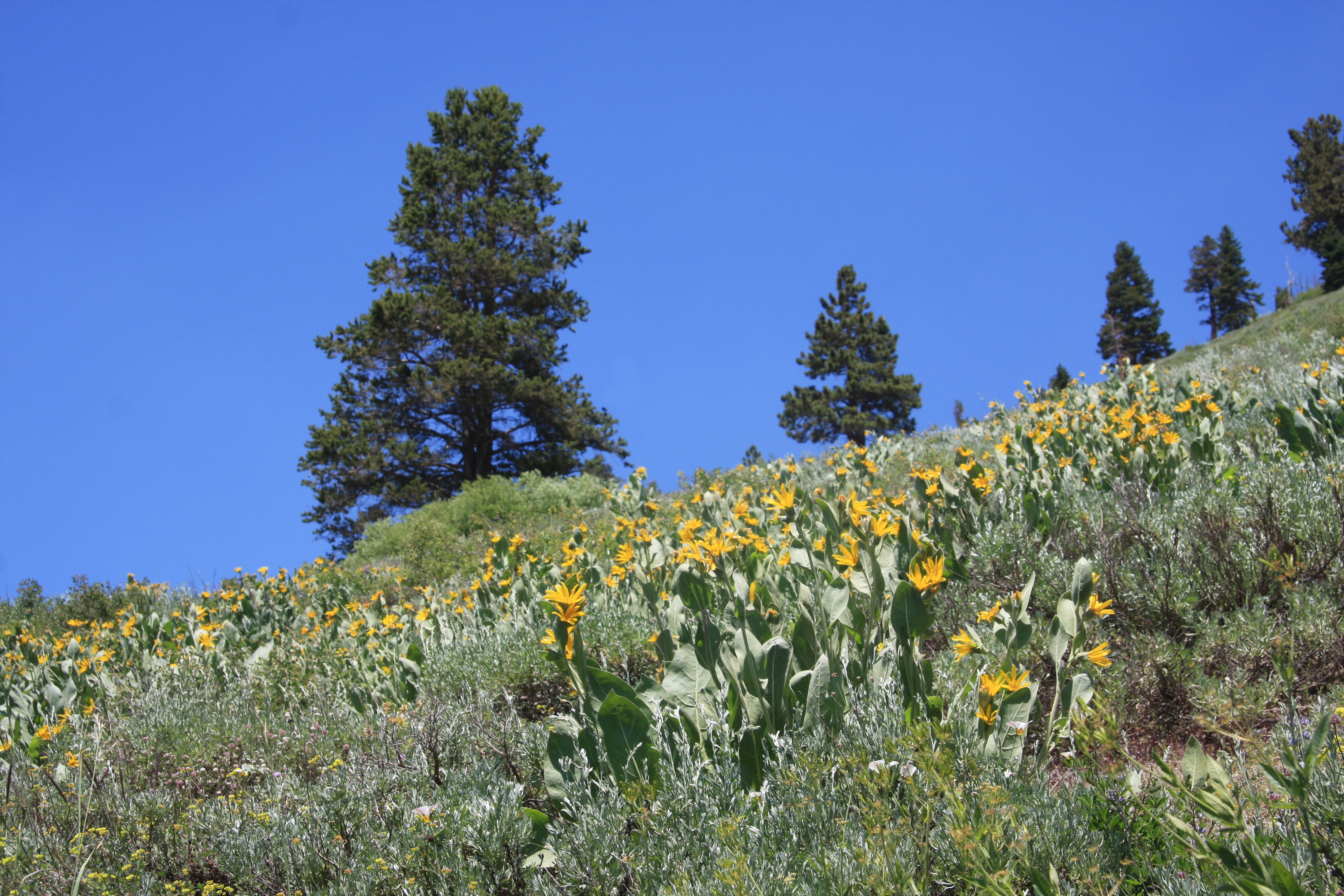
In habitat
