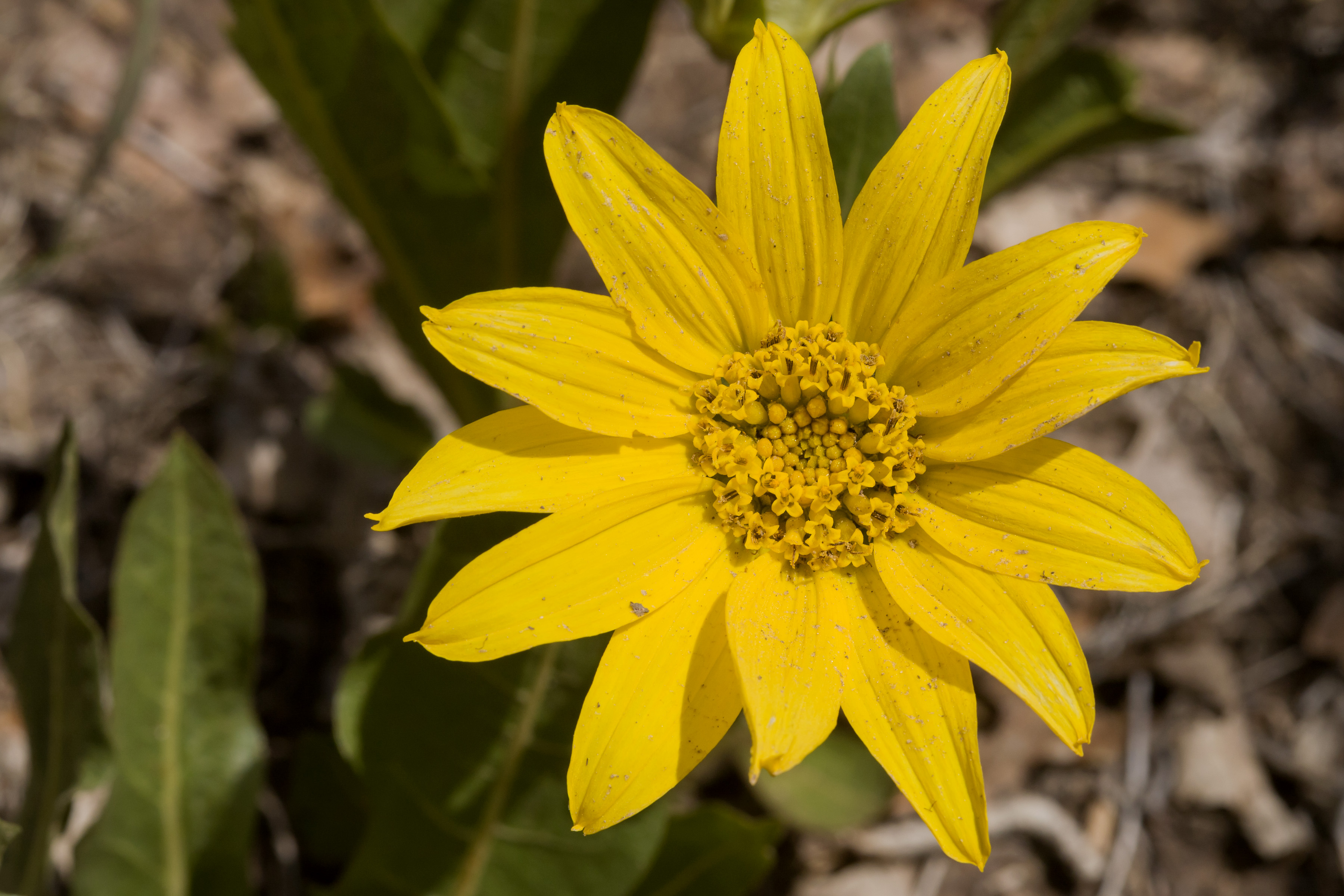

Conservation status
- Secure (NatureServe)

Scientific classification
- Kingdom: Plantae
- Clade: Tracheophytes
- Clade: Angiosperms
- Clade: Eudicots
- Clade: Asterids
- Order: Asterales
- Family: Asteraceae
- Genus: Wyethia
- Species: W. arizonica

Binomial name
- Wyethia arizonica A. Gray

= Wyethia arizonica =

Species of flowering plant

Wyethia arizonica, the Arizona mule's ears, is a plant species native to Arizona, Colorado, New Mexico and Utah. It grows in meadows in coniferous forests at elevations of 600–3,000 m (2,000–9,800 ft).

Wyethia arizonica is a perennial herb with a large taproot, the shoot up to 100 cm (39 in) tall. Leaves are elliptic to lanceolate, up to 30 cm (12 in) long. Flower heads are 1-4 per plant, with yellow flowers.
