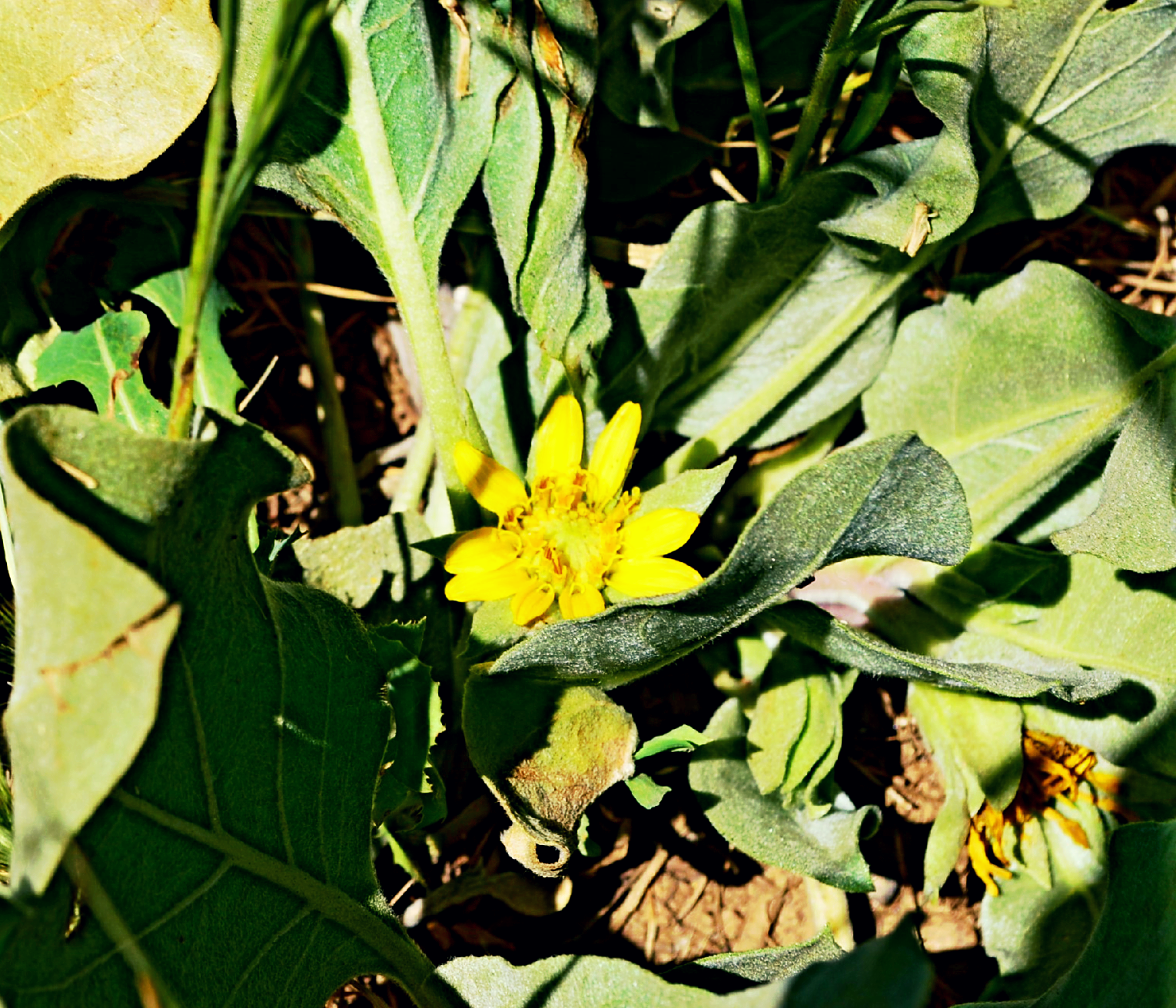

Conservation status
- Vulnerable (NatureServe)

Scientific classification
- Kingdom: Plantae
- Clade: Tracheophytes
- Clade: Angiosperms
- Clade: Eudicots
- Clade: Asterids
- Order: Asterales
- Family: Asteraceae
- Genus: Agnorhiza
- Species: A. ovata

Binomial name
- Agnorhiza ovata (Torr. & A.Gray ex Torr.) W.A.Weber

Synonyms
- Wyethia coriacea A.Gray; Wyethia ovata Torr. & A.Gray ex Torr. & A.Gray

= Agnorhiza ovata =

Species of flowering plant

Agnorhiza ovata (syn. Wyethia ovata) is a species of flowering plant known by the common name southern mule's ears. It is native to the mountains and foothills of southern California and Baja California, occurring the Coast Ranges and Sierra Nevada foothills in Tulare, Kern, Ventura, Los Angeles, Orange, Riverside, and San Diego counties in California, with additional populations in the Peninsular Ranges south of the international border.

== Description ==
Agnorhiza ovata grows in many types of habitat, including pine forests, woodlands, and grassland. It is a perennial herb growing from a thick taproot and caudex unit. The hairy, glandular, sticky-textured stem grows a few centimeters tall to nearly half a meter in maximum height. The leaves have oval blades up to 20 centimeters long which are generally hairy or silky and glandular. The inflorescence is made up of one or more flower heads which may be tucked amongst the uppermost leaves. The head has lance-shaped leaflike phyllaries which may be up to 5 centimeters long. There are 5 to 8 yellow ray florets which measure about 1.5 centimeters in length, and many yellow disc florets in the center. The fruit is an achene about a centimeter long tipped with a short pappus.
